= Nedstrand Municipality =

Former municipality in Rogaland, Norway

Nedstrand Municipality Nedstrand herred
- Former municipality
- Nerstrand herred (historic name); Hinderaa herred (historic name); Nærstrand herred (historic name)
- Rogaland within Norway

- Nedstrand within Rogaland
- Coordinates: 59°20′44″N 05°51′27″E
- Country: Norway
- County: Rogaland
- District: Haugaland
- Established: 1 Jan 1838
  - Created as: Formannskapsdistrikt
- Disestablished: 1 Jan 1965
  - Succeeded by: Tysvær Municipality
- Administrative centre: Nedstrand

Government
  - Mayor (1951–1965): Olav Bog (V)

Area (upon dissolution)
  - Total: 118.9 km^{2} (45.9 sq mi)
  - Rank: #403 in Norway
- Highest elevation: 630.67 m (2,069.1 ft)

Population (1964)
  - Total: 1,201
  - Rank: #474 in Norway
  - Density: 10.1/km^{2} (26/sq mi)
  - Change (10 years): ▼ −6.9%
- Demonym: Nedstrending

Official language
  - Norwegian form: Nynorsk
- Time zone: UTC+01:00 (CET)
  - Summer (DST): UTC+02:00 (CEST)
- ISO 3166 code: NO-1139

Nedstrand is a former municipality in Rogaland county, Norway. The 118.9-square-kilometre (45.9 sq mi) municipality existed from 1838 until its dissolution in 1965. The area is now part of Tysvær Municipality in the traditional district of Haugaland. The administrative centre was the village of Nedstrand. Other villages in the municipality included Hinderåvåg, Espevik, and Vassenden.

Prior to its dissolution in 1965, the 118.9-square-kilometre (45.9 sq mi) municipality was the 403rd largest by area out of the 525 municipalities in Norway. Nedstrand Municipality was the 474th most populous municipality in Norway with a population of about 1,201. The municipality's population density was 10.1 inhabitants per square kilometre (26/sq mi) and its population had decreased by 6.9% over the previous 10-year period.

== General information ==
The parish of Nærstrand was established as a municipality on 1 January 1838 (see formannskapsdistrikt law). Originally, it encompassed the two sokn (parishes) of Hinderaa (located on the northern mainland part of the municipality) and Sjærnerø (the southern island) in the Nedstrandfjorden). On 1 January 1868, the municipality was divided as follows:

- the southern islands (population: 922) became the new Sjærnerø Municipality
- remaining northern mainland portion (population: 1,680) was renamed as Hinderaa Municipality

On 10 August 1881, a royal resolution changed the name of Hinderaa Municipality back to Nerstrand Municipality (with a slight spelling change from its previous spelling). Later, between 1910 and 1920 the spelling was changed slightly to Nedstrand Municipality to better match the local pronunciation.

During the 1960s, there were many municipal mergers across Norway due to the work of the Schei Committee. On 1 January 1965, Nedstrand Municipality was dissolved and the following areas were merged to form a new, larger Tysvær Municipality:

- all of Nedstrand Municipality (population: 1,200)
- all of Tysvær Municipality (population: 1,862)
- the Gismarvik, Førre, and Stegaberg areas of the old Avaldsnes Municipality (population: 994)
- the Grinde, Dueland, and Yrkje areas of the old Skjold Municipality (population: 1,133)
- the Breidal and Stølsvik areas of the old Vats Municipality (population: 16)
- the Hapnes and Dokskar areas of the old Vikedal Municipality (population: 2)

=== Name ===
The municipality (originally the parish) was originally named Nærstrand Municipality, after the old Nærstrand farm (Old Norse: Nesjarstrǫnd). The first element is the plural form of the word nes which means "headland". The last element is strǫnd which means "beach" or "shore".

In 1868, when the municipality was divided, the southern islands became the new Sjærnerø Municipality and the remaining parts of the Nærstrand Municipality was re-named Hinderaa Municipality. This name came from the old Hinderaa farm (Old Norse: Hinderá) since the first Nedstrand Church was built there. The farm was named after a local river. The first element is hind which means "female deer". The last element is á which means "river" or "creek".

On 10 August 1881, a royal resolution changed the name of the municipality back to Nerstrand, using a more modern spelling of the old name. On 3 November 1917, a royal resolution changed the spelling of the name of the municipality to Nedstrand, a spelling that more closely matched the local pronunciation of the name.

=== Churches ===
The Church of Norway had one parish (sokn) within Nedstrand Municipality. At the time of the municipal dissolution, it was part of the Nedstrand prestegjeld and the Ryfylke prosti (deanery) in the Diocese of Stavanger.

Churches in Nedstrand Municipality
Parish (sokn)	Church name	Location of the church	Year built
Nedstrand	Nedstrand Church	Hinderåvåg	1868

== Geography ==
The municipality was located on the north side of the Nedstrandfjorden, an inner branch off the large Boknafjorden. The municipality encompassed the majority of the Nedstrand peninsula. Originally (from 1838 to 1868) it also included the Sjernarøyane islands and the western part of the island of Ombo in the fjord to the south. The Nedstrand peninsula is surrounded by the Hervikfjorden and Skjoldafjorden to the west, Yrkjesfjorden to the north, and Vindafjorden on the west. The highest point in the municipality was the 630.67-metre (2,069.1 ft) tall mountain Lammanuten which was located along the border with Vats Municipality.

Vats Municipality was located to the north, Vikedal Municipality was located to the northeast, Jelsa Municipality was located to the southeast, Sjernarøy Municipality was located to the south, Bokn Municipality was located to the southwest, Tysvær Municipality was located to the west, and Skjold Municipality was located to the northwest.

== Government ==
While it existed, Nedstrand Municipality was responsible for primary education (through 10th grade), outpatient health services, senior citizen services, welfare and other social services, zoning, economic development, and municipal roads and utilities. The municipality was governed by a municipal council of directly elected representatives. The mayor was indirectly elected by a vote of the municipal council. The municipality was under the jurisdiction of the Karmsund District Court and the Gulating Court of Appeal.

=== Municipal council ===
The municipal council (Heradsstyre) of Nedstrand Municipality was made up of representatives that were elected to four year terms. The tables below show the historical composition of the council by political party.

Nedstrand herredsstyre 1963–1964
Party name (in Norwegian)	Number of representatives
Labour Party (Arbeiderpartiet)	1
Conservative Party (Høyre)	2
Christian Democratic Party (Kristelig Folkeparti)	5
Centre Party (Senterpartiet)	5
Liberal Party (Venstre)	4
Total number of members:	17
Note: On 1 January 1965, Nedstrand Municipality became part of Tysvær Municipality.

Nedstrand herredsstyre 1959–1963
Party name (in Norwegian)	Number of representatives
Labour Party (Arbeiderpartiet)	2
Conservative Party (Høyre)	2
Christian Democratic Party (Kristelig Folkeparti)	4
Centre Party (Senterpartiet)	5
Liberal Party (Venstre)	4
Total number of members:	17

Nedstrand herredsstyre 1955–1959
Party name (in Norwegian)	Number of representatives
Labour Party (Arbeiderpartiet)	1
Conservative Party (Høyre)	2
Christian Democratic Party (Kristelig Folkeparti)	5
Farmers' Party (Bondepartiet)	5
Liberal Party (Venstre)	4
Total number of members:	17

Nedstrand herredsstyre 1951–1955
Party name (in Norwegian)	Number of representatives
Labour Party (Arbeiderpartiet)	1
Conservative Party (Høyre)	2
Farmers' Party (Bondepartiet)	6
Liberal Party (Venstre)	5
Local List(s) (Lokale lister)	2
Total number of members:	16

Nedstrand herredsstyre 1947–1951
Party name (in Norwegian)	Number of representatives
Labour Party (Arbeiderpartiet)	2
Conservative Party (Høyre)	3
Farmers' Party (Bondepartiet)	4
Liberal Party (Venstre)	4
Local List(s) (Lokale lister)	3
Total number of members:	16

Nedstrand herredsstyre 1945–1947
Party name (in Norwegian)	Number of representatives
Labour Party (Arbeiderpartiet)	2
Conservative Party (Høyre)	2
Farmers' Party (Bondepartiet)	4
Liberal Party (Venstre)	4
Local List(s) (Lokale lister)	4
Total number of members:	16

Nedstrand herredsstyre 1937–1941*
Party name (in Norwegian)	Number of representatives
Labour Party (Arbeiderpartiet)	2
Liberal Party (Venstre)	4
Joint list of the Conservative Party (Høyre) and the Free-minded People's Party (Frisinnede Folkeparti)	5
Local List(s) (Lokale lister)	5
Total number of members:	16
Note: Due to the German occupation of Norway during World War II, no elections were held for new municipal councils until after the war ended in 1945.

=== Mayors ===
The mayor (Nynorsk: ordførar) of Nedstrand Municipality was the political leader of the municipality and the chairperson of the municipal council. The following people have held this position:

- 1838–1839: Rev. Hans Christian Ebbesen
- 1840–1841: Gudmund G. Buestad
- 1842–1845: Rev. Hans Christian Ebbesen
- 1846–1847: Peder Olsen Tendeland
- 1848–1851: Anders Larsen Muusland
- 1852–1852: Gudmund G. Buestad
- 1853–1853: Osmund Olsen Topnes
- 1854–1857: Thormod Ormsen Øverland
- 1858–1859: Anders Larsen Muusland
- 1859–1863: Peder Larsen Bjelland
- 1864–1871: Osmund Rasmussen Elfervig
- 1872–1879: Peder Larsen Bjelland
- 1880–1881: Thorbjørn T. Næsse
- 1882–1883: Gudmund Bakkevig
- 1884–1885: Lars A. Musland
- 1886–1887: Ole Pedersen Tendeland
- 1888–1889: Lars L. Dalva
- 1890–1893: Ole Pedersen Tendeland
- 1894–1901: Lars L. Dalva
- 1902–1919: Gudmund Helle
- 1920–1922: Hans Jørgensen Aarstad (V)
- 1923–1931: Tore Sandsgård (V)
- 1933–1937: Anders Musland (Bp)
- 1938–1941: Hans Jørgensen Aarstad (V)
- 1942–1945: Bjørn Maurland (NS)
- 1945–1945: Hans Jørgensen Aarstad (V)
- 1945–1951: Albert Lothe (V)
- 1951–1965: Olav Bog (V)

== See also ==
- List of former municipalities of Norway
