= Skjoldastraumen Church =

Church in Rogaland, Norway

- Skjoldastraumen kyrkje
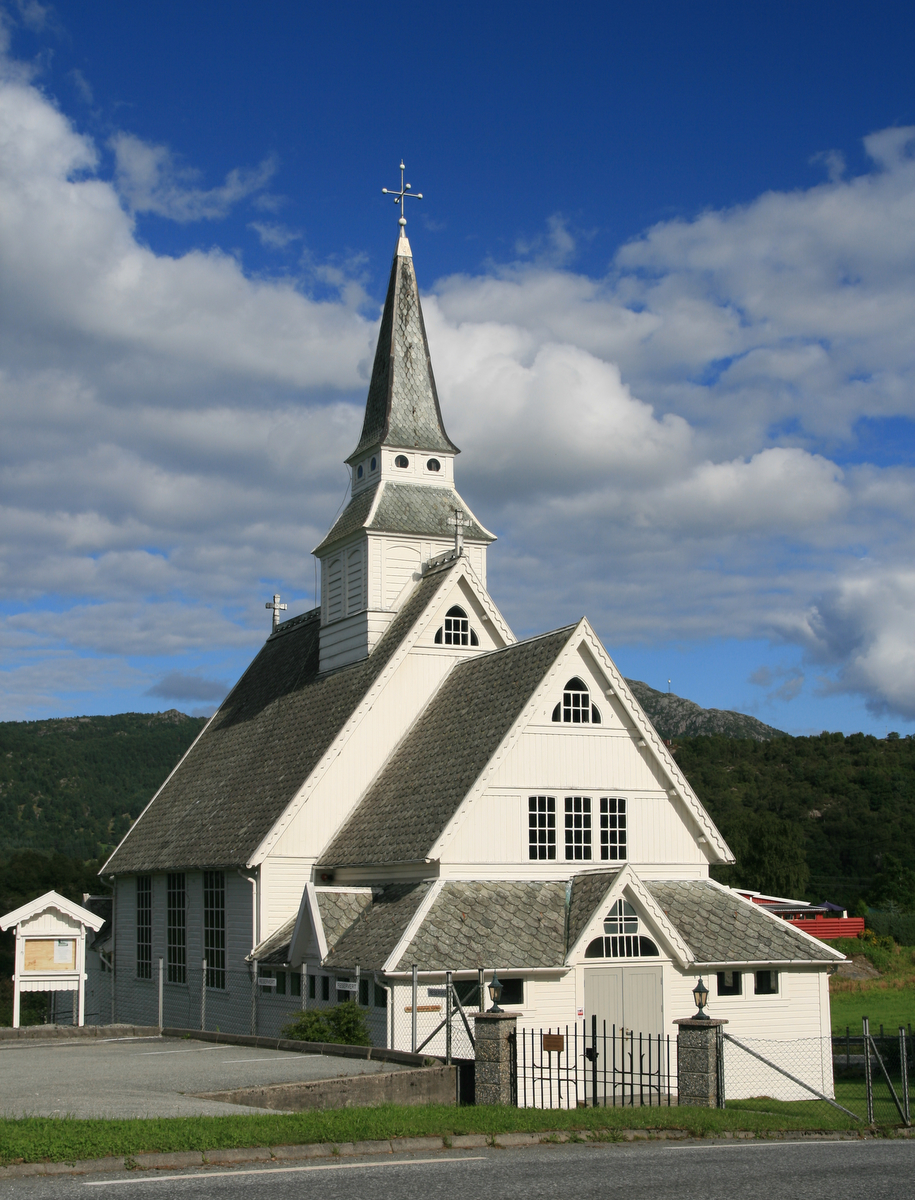
- View of the church Credit: Jarle Vines
- Skjoldastraumen Church
- 59.43212°N 5.614407°E
- Location: Tysvær Municipality, Rogaland
- Country: Norway
- Denomination: Church of Norway
- Churchmanship: Evangelical Lutheran

History
- Status: Parish church
- Founded: 1910
- Consecrated: 1910

Architecture
- Functional status: Active
- Architect: Einar Halleland
- Architectural type: Long church
- Completed: 1910 (116 years ago)

Specifications
- Capacity: 295
- Materials: Wood

Administration
- Diocese: Stavanger bispedømme
- Deanery: Haugaland prosti
- Parish: Nedstrand
- Norwegian Cultural Heritage Site
- Type: Church
- Status: Protected
- ID: 85464

Skjoldastraumen Church (Norwegian: Skjoldastraumen kyrkje) is a parish church of the Church of Norway in Tysvær Municipality in Rogaland county, Norway. It is located in the village of Skjoldastraumen, along the Skjoldafjorden. It is one of the two churches for the Nedstrand parish, part of the Haugaland prosti (deanery) in the Diocese of Stavanger. The white, wooden church was built in a long church style in 1910 using designs by the architect Einar Halleland from Haugesund. The church seats about 295 people.

== See also ==
- List of churches in Rogaland
