= Aksdalsvatnet =

Lake in Rogaland, Norway

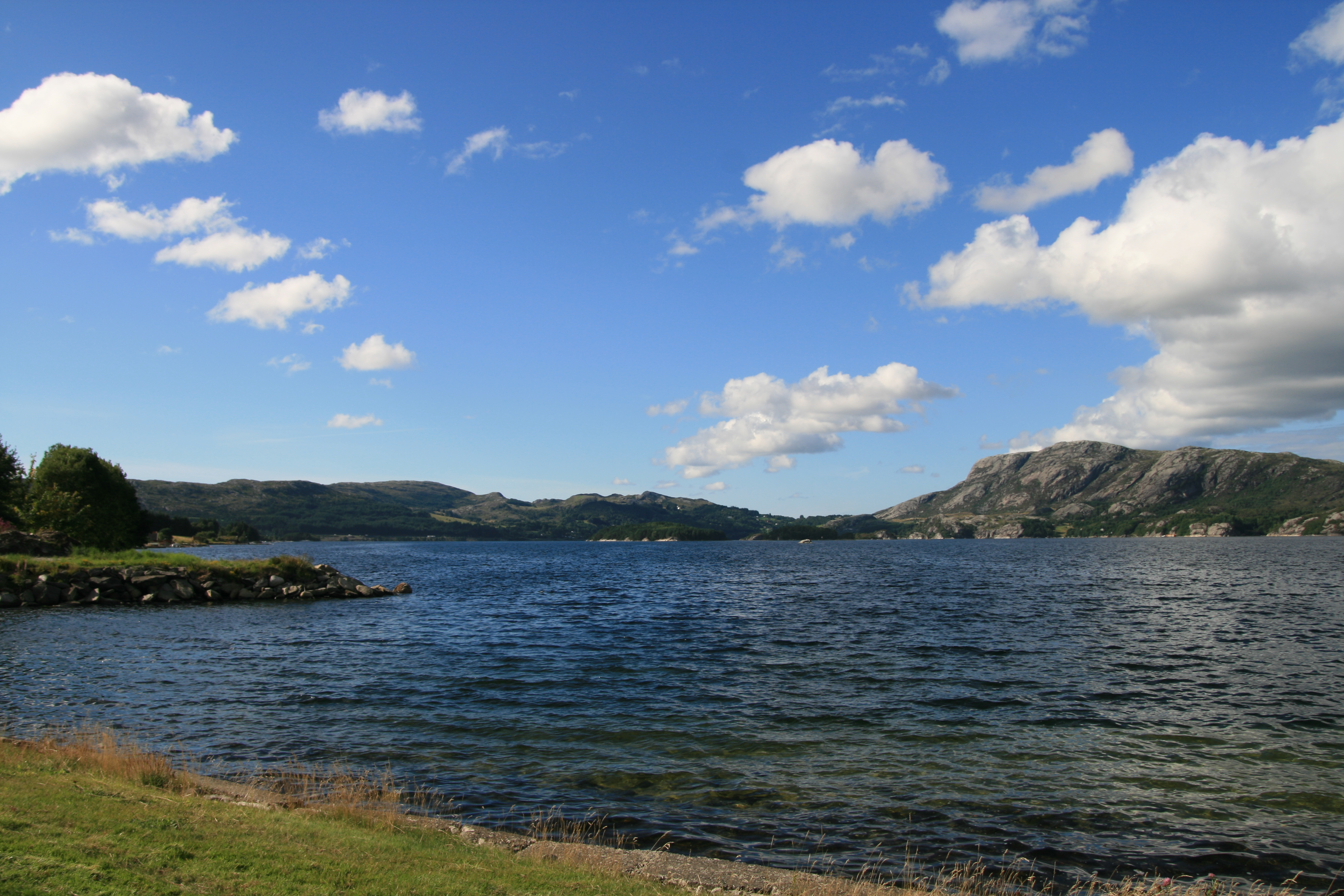
- Interactive map of Aksdalsvatnet
- Location: Tysvær Municipality, Rogaland
- Coordinates: 59.40949°N 5.4213°E
- Basin countries: Norway
- Max. length: 3 kilometres (1.9 mi)
- Max. width: 2 kilometres (1.2 mi)
- Surface area: 3.46 km^{2} (1.34 sq mi)
- Shore length^{1}: 15.53 kilometres (9.65 mi)
- Surface elevation: 18 metres (59 ft)
- References: NVE
- ^{1} Shore length is not a well-defined measure.

Aksdalsvatnet is a lake in Tysvær Municipality in Rogaland county, Norway. The 3.46-square-kilometre (1.34 sq mi) lake lies southeast of the village of Førre and south of the village of Aksdal. The European route E134 highway runs along the northern shore of the lake and the European route E39 highway along the eastern shore of the lake.

== See also ==
- List of lakes in Norway
