= Yrkje =

Village in Tysvær Municipality, Norway

Yrkje Yrke
- Village
- Interactive map of Yrkje
- Coordinates: 59.39739°N 5.66914°E
- Country: Norway
- Region: Western Norway
- County: Rogaland
- District: Haugaland
- Municipality: Tysvær Municipality
- Elevation: 42 m (138 ft)
- Time zone: UTC+01:00 (CET)
  - Summer (DST): UTC+02:00 (CEST)
- Post Code: 5567 Skjoldastraumen

Yrkje is a village in Tysvær Municipality in Rogaland county, Norway. The village is located at the western end of the Yrkjesfjorden, a branch off of the main Vindafjorden. The village lies on a small isthmus between the Yrkjesfjorden and the Skjoldafjorden, along the County Road 515, the only road over the isthmus connecting the peninsula to the mainland. The village of Skjoldastraumen lies about 5 kilometres (3.1 mi) to the northwest and the villages of Hindaråvåg and Nedstrand lie about 20 kilometres (12 mi) to the southeast.

== History ==
The Yrke area was administratively part of the old Skjold Municipality since 1838 when municipalities were created in Norway. On 1 January 1965, Skjold Municipality was dissolved and its territory divided among three neighboring municipalities. The southwestern part of Skjold, which included the districts of Yrkje, Dueland, and Grinde with a total of 1,133 inhabitants were merged into Tysvær Municipality.
