= Førre Church =

Church in Rogaland, Norway

- Førre kyrkje
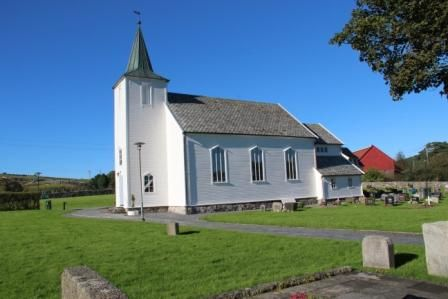
- View of the church
- Førre Church
- 59.42430°N 5.38091°E
- Location: Tysvær Municipality, Rogaland
- Country: Norway
- Denomination: Church of Norway
- Churchmanship: Evangelical Lutheran

History
- Status: Parish church
- Founded: 1893
- Consecrated: 19 Sept 1893

Architecture
- Functional status: Active
- Architect: Tjerand T. Solheim
- Architectural type: Long church
- Completed: 1893 (133 years ago)

Specifications
- Capacity: 350
- Materials: Wood

Administration
- Diocese: Stavanger bispedømme
- Deanery: Haugaland prosti
- Parish: Førresfjorden

Førre Church (Norwegian: Førre kyrkje) is a parish church of the Church of Norway in Tysvær Municipality in Rogaland county, Norway. It is located in the village of Førre, which sits along the European route E134 highway. It is one of the two churches for the Førresfjorden parish, which is part of the Haugaland prosti (deanery) in the Diocese of Stavanger.

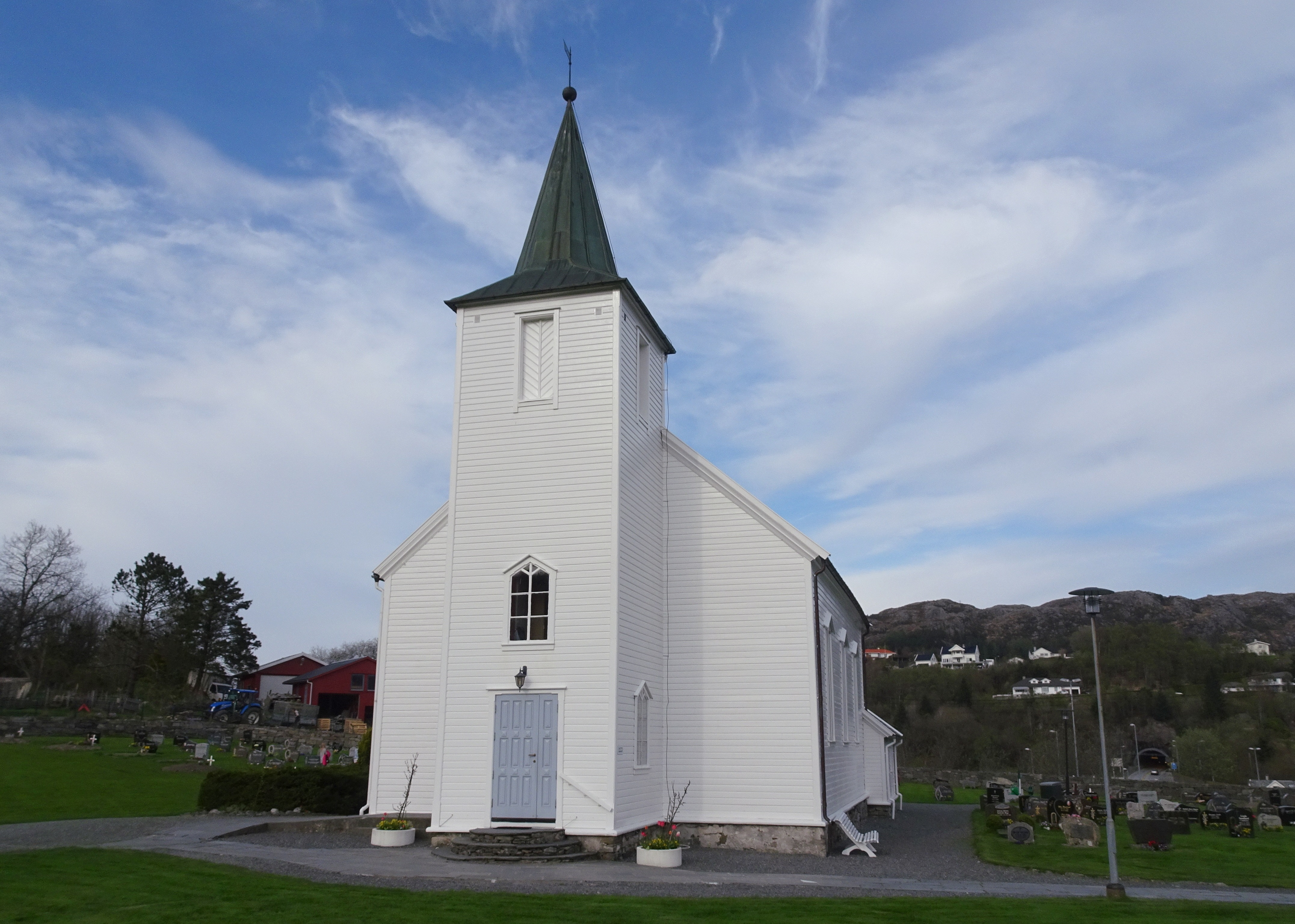
Front view of the church

The white, wooden church was built in a long church style in 1893, using designs by the architect Tjerand T. Solheim. The church seats about 350 people. The church was consecrated on 19 September 1893.

== See also ==
- List of churches in Rogaland
