= Skjold Municipality =

Former municipality in Rogaland, Norway

Skjold Municipality Skjold herred
- Former municipality
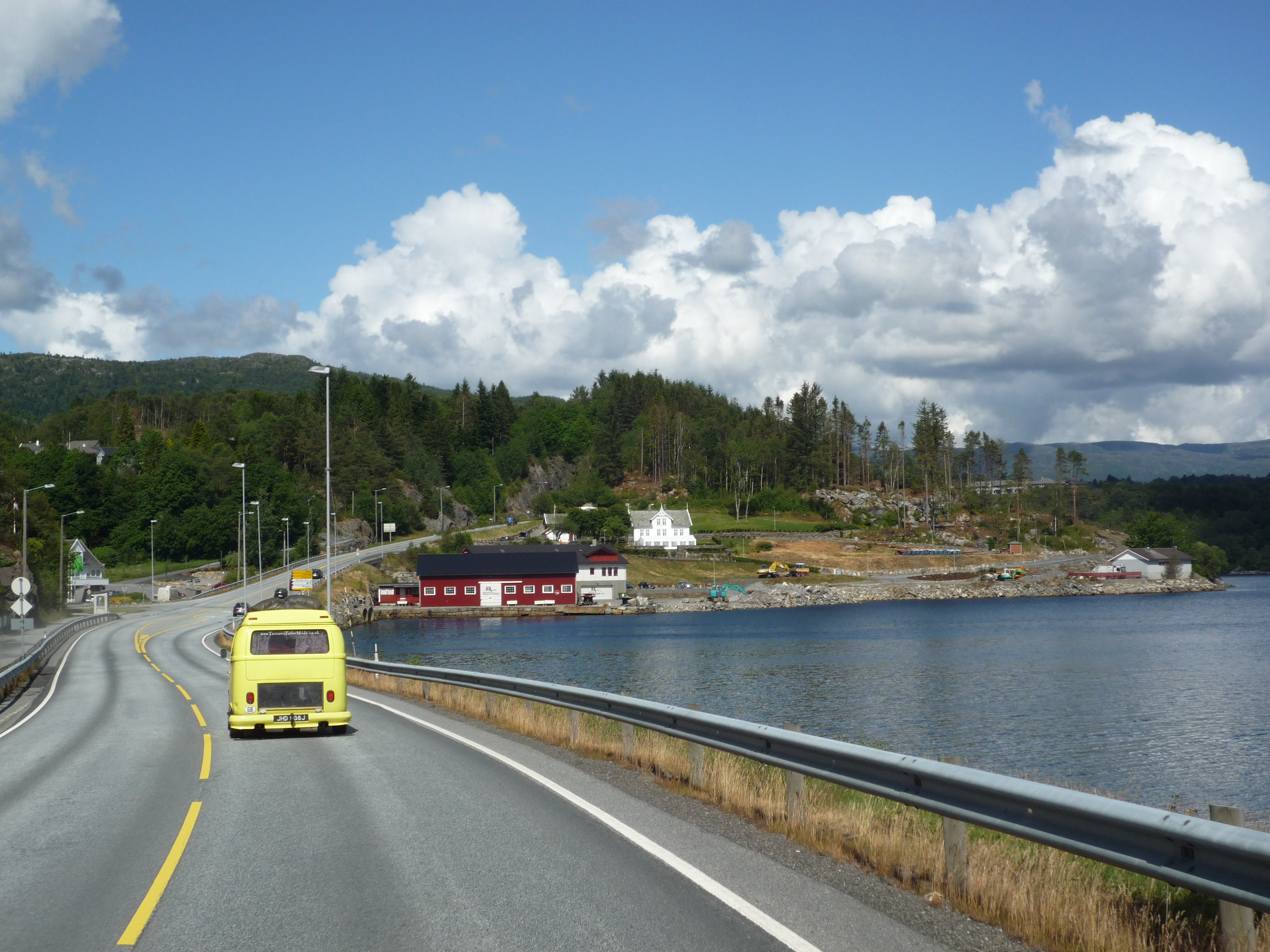
- View of the Skjold area

- Rogaland within Norway

- Skjold within Rogaland
- Coordinates: 59°30′09″N 05°35′12″E
- Country: Norway
- County: Rogaland
- District: Haugaland
- Established: 1 Jan 1838
  - Created as: Formannskapsdistrikt
- Disestablished: 1 Jan 1965
  - Succeeded by: Vindafjord Municipality and Tysvær Municipality
- Administrative centre: Skjold

Government
  - Mayor (1963–1964): Gerhard Kyvik

Area (upon dissolution)
  - Total: 171.7 km^{2} (66.3 sq mi)
  - Rank: #357 in Norway
- Highest elevation: 630 m (2,070 ft)

Population (1964)
  - Total: 2,419
  - Rank: #353 in Norway
  - Density: 14.1/km^{2} (37/sq mi)
  - Change (10 years): ▲ +0.9%
- Demonym: Skjoldabu

Official language
  - Norwegian form: Neutral
- Time zone: UTC+01:00 (CET)
  - Summer (DST): UTC+02:00 (CEST)
- ISO 3166 code: NO-1154

Skjold is a former municipality in Rogaland county, Norway. The 171.7-square-kilometre (66.3 sq mi) municipality existed from 1838 until its dissolution in 1965. The area is now divided between Tysvær Municipality and Vindafjord Municipality in the traditional district of Haugaland. The administrative centre was the village of Skjold.

Prior to its dissolution in 1965, the 171.7-square-kilometre (66.3 sq mi) municipality was the 357th largest by area out of the 525 municipalities in Norway. Skjold Municipality was the 353rd most populous municipality in Norway with a population of about 2,419. The municipality's population density was 14.1 inhabitants per square kilometre (37/sq mi) and its population had increased by 0.9% over the previous 10-year period.

== General information ==
The parish of Skjold was established as a municipality on 1 January 1838 (see formannskapsdistrikt law). In 1849, Skjold Municipality was divided as follows: the southwestern half (population: 2,058) became the new Tysvær Municipality and the northeastern half (population: 3,439) remained as a smaller Skjold Municipality.

In 1891, Skjold Municipality was divided again: the eastern district (population: 1,095) became the new Vats Municipality and the western district (population: 1,961) remained as a smaller Skjold Municipality.

During the 1960s, there were many municipal mergers across Norway due to the work of the Schei Committee, including some changes to Skjold Municipality. On 1 January 1964, a small part of Skjold Municipality located north of the Ålfjorden (population: 24) was transferred to Sveio Municipality in Hordaland county. Then on 1 January 1965, Skjold Municipality was dissolved and its lands were divided as follows:

- the districts of Liarheim and Langeland (population: 1,262), mostly located north and east of the Grindafjorden were merged with Sandeid Municipality and parts of Imsland Municipality, Vats Municipality, and Vikedal Municipality to create the new Vindafjord Municipality
- the districts of Dueland, Grinde, and Yrkje (population: 1,133), mostly located south and west of the Grindafjorden and Skjoldafjorden, were merged with Tysvær Municipality and Nedstrand Municipality and parts of Avaldsnes Municipality, Vats Municipality, and Vikedal Municipality to form the new, larger Tysvær Municipality.

=== Name ===
The municipality (originally the parish) is named after the old Skjold farm (Old Norse: Skjǫldr) since the first Skjold Church was built there. The name is identical to the word skjǫldr which means "shield".

=== Churches ===
The Church of Norway had one parish (sokn) within Skjold Municipality. At the time of the municipal dissolution, it was part of the Skjold prestegjeld and the Karmsund prosti (deanery) in the Diocese of Stavanger.

Churches in Skjold Municipality
Parish (sokn)	Church name	Location of the church	Year built
Skjold	Skjold Church	Skjold	1887*
*Note: This church burned down in 1992 and a new church replaced it in 1999.

== Geography ==
The municipality encompassed all the area surrounding the Grindafjorden and Skjoldafjorden. The highest point in the municipality was the 630-metre (2,070 ft) tall mountain Lammanuten, located on the border with Nedstrand Municipality. Ølen Municipality (in Hordaland county) was located to the north, Vats Municipality was located to the east, Nedstrand Municipality was located to the southeast, Tysvær Municipality was located to the southwest, Avaldsnes Municipality was located to the west, Haugesund Municipality was located to the west-northwest, and Vikebygd Municipality (in Hordaland county) was located to the northwest.

== Government ==
While it existed, Skjold Municipality was responsible for primary education (through 10th grade), outpatient health services, senior citizen services, welfare and other social services, zoning, economic development, and municipal roads and utilities. The municipality was governed by a municipal council of directly elected representatives. The mayor was indirectly elected by a vote of the municipal council. The municipality was under the jurisdiction of the Karmsund District Court and the Gulating Court of Appeal.

=== Municipal council ===
The municipal council (Herredsstyre) of Skjold Municipality was made up of 17representatives that were elected to four year terms. The tables below show the historical composition of the council by political party.

Skjold herredsstyre 1963–1964
Party name (in Norwegian)	Number of representatives
Labour Party (Arbeiderpartiet)	3
Local List(s) (Lokale lister)	14
Total number of members:	17
Note: On 1 January 1965, Skjold Municipality was divided between Tysvær Municipality and Vindafjord Municipality.

Skjold herredsstyre 1959–1963
Party name (in Norwegian)	Number of representatives
Labour Party (Arbeiderpartiet)	2
Local List(s) (Lokale lister)	15
Total number of members:	17

Skjold herredsstyre 1955–1959
Party name (in Norwegian)	Number of representatives
Local List(s) (Lokale lister)	17
Total number of members:	17

Skjold herredsstyre 1951–1955
Party name (in Norwegian)	Number of representatives
List of workers, fishermen, and small farmholders (Arbeidere, fiskere, småbrukere liste)	1
Local List(s) (Lokale lister)	15
Total number of members:	16

Skjold herredsstyre 1947–1951
Party name (in Norwegian)	Number of representatives
Local List(s) (Lokale lister)	16
Total number of members:	16

Skjold herredsstyre 1945–1947
Party name (in Norwegian)	Number of representatives
List of workers, fishermen, and small farmholders (Arbeidere, fiskere, småbrukere liste)	2
Local List(s) (Lokale lister)	14
Total number of members:	16

Skjold herredsstyre 1937–1941*
Party name (in Norwegian)	Number of representatives
Local List(s) (Lokale lister)	16
Total number of members:	16
Note: Due to the German occupation of Norway during World War II, no elections were held for new municipal councils until after the war ended in 1945.

=== Mayors ===
The mayor (Norwegian: ordfører) of Skjold Municipality was the political leader of the municipality and the chairperson of the municipal council. The following people have held this position:

- 1838–1841: Hans Iversen Egge
- 1842–1843: Rev. Jens Braage Halvorsen
- 1844–1847: Jacob H. Smedsvig
- 1848–1851: Sjur Sjursen Økland
- 1852–1853: Lars S. Gjerde
- 1854–1855: Henrik Andreas Dybdal
- 1856–1857: Ivar J. Alendal
- 1858–1869: Henrik Andreas Dybdal
- 1870–1871: Johannes Olsen Haraldseide
- 1872–1873: Henrik Andreas Dybdal
- 1874–1875: Mons E. Frøvig
- 1876–1879: Ivar H. Egge
- 1880–1881: Erik Eriksen Koltveit
- 1882–1893: Ivar H. Egge
- 1894–1897: Ole Henriksen Dybdal
- 1898–1901: Ole G. Dagsland
- 1902–1913: Knud Langeland
- 1914–1915: Sevald Foss
- 1916–1916: Knud Langeland
- 1917–1928: Thorleif Austreim
- 1929–1931: Lars Bjoland
- 1931–1941: Emil Knutsen
- 1942–1945: Bj. Bjelland
- 1945–1945: Emil Knutsen
- 1946–1947: Arne J. Tveit
- 1947–1961: Emil Knutsen
- 1961–1963: Olav Straum
- 1963–1964: Gerhard Kyvik

== See also ==
- List of former municipalities of Norway
