= Dueland, Rogaland =

Village in Tysvær Municipality, Norway

Dueland Dualand
- Village
- Interactive map of Dueland
- Coordinates: 59.43113°N 5.59718°E
- Country: Norway
- Region: Western Norway
- County: Rogaland
- District: Haugaland
- Municipality: Tysvær Municipality
- Elevation: 76 m (249 ft)
- Time zone: UTC+01:00 (CET)
  - Summer (DST): UTC+02:00 (CEST)
- Post Code: 5567 Skjoldastraumen

Dueland is a village in Tysvær Municipality in Rogaland county, Norway. It is located less than 1 kilometre (0.62 mi) west of the larger village of Skjoldastraumen.

== History ==
It was previously located in the old Skjold Municipality. On 1 January 1965, Skjold Municipality was dissolved, and its territory dispersed between three municipalities. The districts surrounding Yrkje, Dueland, and Grinde, with 1,133 inhabitants in total, were moved to Tysvær Municipality.

People with the surname Dueland could be people whose families were originally from this farm, but typically people with that last name hail from a different farm called Dueland in the old Ølen Municipality. Several of those residents emigrated to the United States, particularly to the states of Nebraska, Illinois and Iowa.
