= Aksdal Church =

Church in Rogaland, Norway

- Aksdal kyrkje
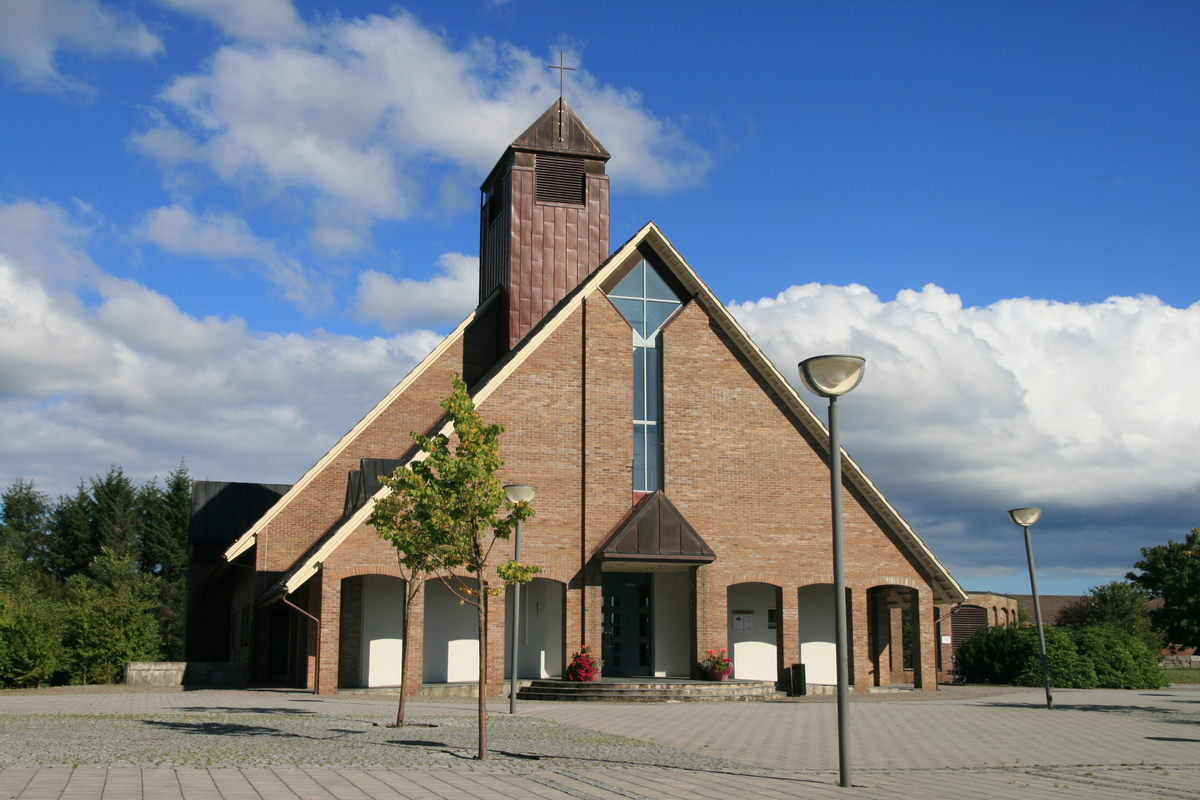
- View of the church Credit: Jarle Vines
- Aksdal Church
- 59.423071°N 5.446123°E
- Location: Tysvær Municipality, Rogaland
- Country: Norway
- Denomination: Church of Norway
- Churchmanship: Evangelical Lutheran

History
- Status: Parish church
- Founded: 1995
- Consecrated: 27 Aug 1995

Architecture
- Functional status: Active
- Architect: Stein Jarle Helgeland
- Architectural type: Long church
- Completed: 1995 (31 years ago)

Specifications
- Capacity: 450
- Materials: Brick

Administration
- Diocese: Stavanger bispedømme
- Deanery: Haugaland prosti
- Parish: Førresfjorden

Aksdal Church (Norwegian: Aksdal kyrkje) is a parish church of the Church of Norway in Tysvær Municipality, Rogaland county, Norway. The church is located in the village of Aksdal and it is one of the two churches for the Førresfjorden parish, which is part of the Haugaland prosti (deanery) in the Diocese of Stavanger. The red brick church was built in a long church style in 1995 using designs by architect Stein Jarle Helgeland. It seats about 450 people. The church, which cost about 21.3 million kr to build, was consecrated on 27 August 1995.

== See also ==
- List of churches in Rogaland
