= Borgøyna =

Island in Rogaland, Norway

Borgøyna Borgøya / Borgøy
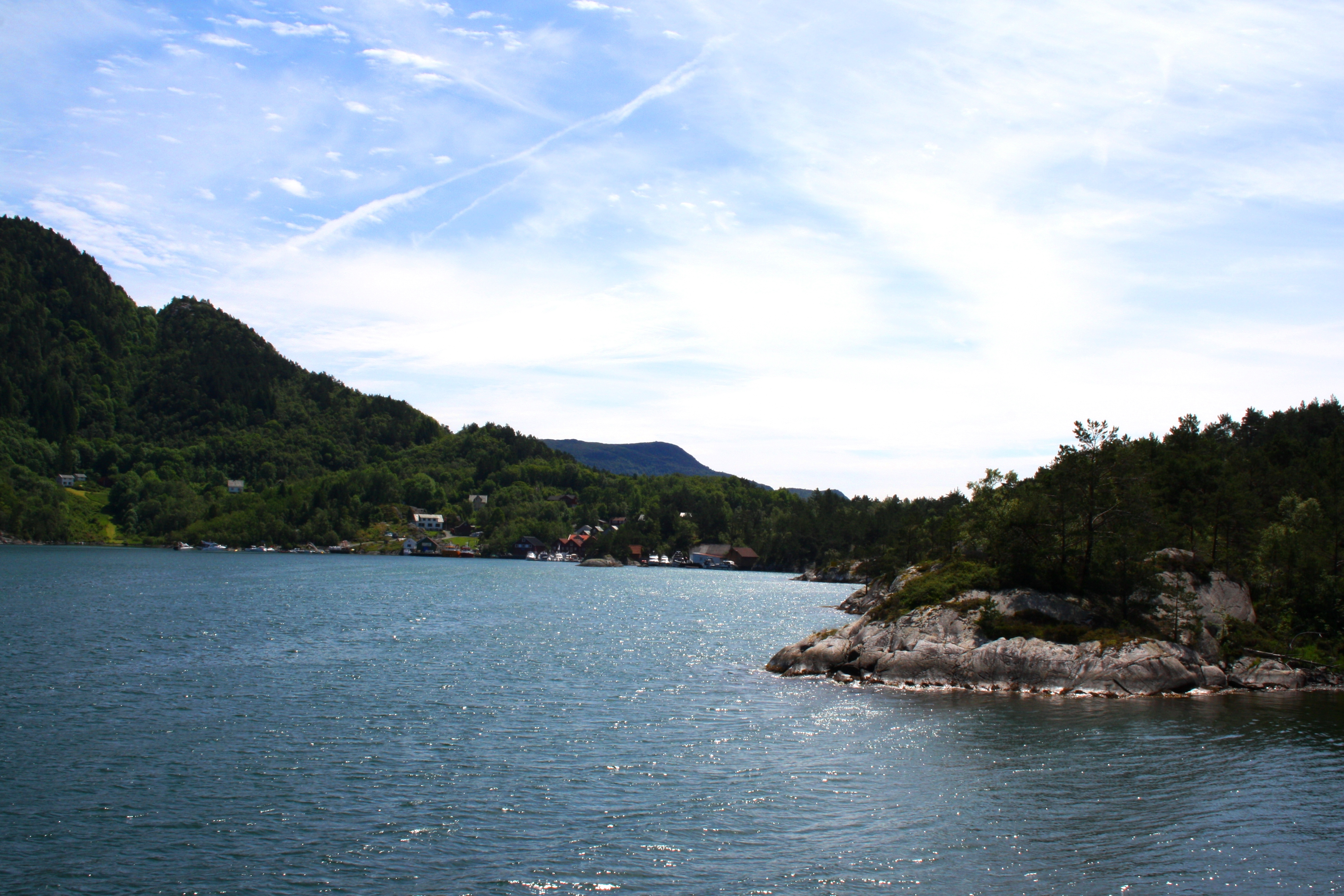
- Hattarvågen bay on the west side of Borgøy
- Interactive map of the island

Geography
- Location: Rogaland, Norway
- Coordinates: 59.35333°N 5.63554°E
- Area: 4.5 km^{2} (1.7 sq mi)
- Length: 4 km (2.5 mi)
- Width: 2 km (1.2 mi)
- Highest elevation: 292 m (958 ft)
- Highest point: Borgøyhatten

Administration
- Norway
- County: Rogaland
- Municipality: Tysvær Municipality

Demographics
- Population: 9 (2017)
- Pop. density: 2/km^{2} (5/sq mi)

Borgøyna is an island in Tysvær Municipality in Rogaland county, Norway. The 4.5-square-kilometre (1.7 sq mi) island is located at the southern end of the Skjoldafjorden. South of the island lies the Hervikfjorden. The highest point on the island is the 292-metre (958 ft) tall mountain Borgøyhatten.

The island is accessible only by boat as there are no bridge or tunnel connections. The main population centre is the relatively flat southwestern coast of the island. Borgøyna was the birthplace of painter Lars Hertervig. The island has tin and granite mines.

== See also ==
- List of islands of Norway
