= Tysvær Church =

Church in Rogaland, Norway

- Tysvær kyrkje
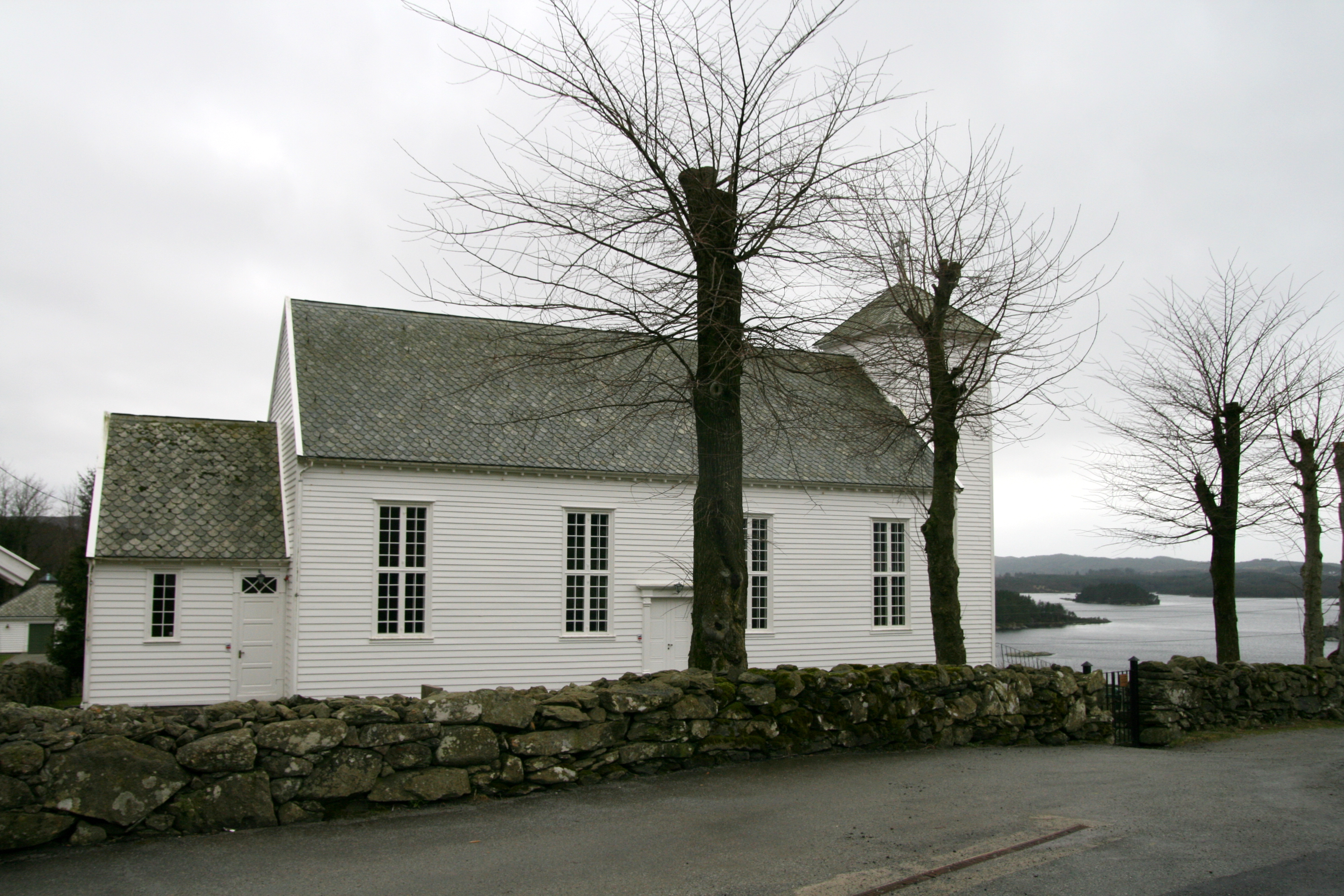
- View of the church Credit: Jarle Vines
- Tysvær Church
- 59.331507°N 5.49187°E
- Location: Tysvær Municipality, Rogaland
- Country: Norway
- Denomination: Church of Norway
- Churchmanship: Evangelical Lutheran

History
- Status: Parish church
- Founded: 13th century
- Consecrated: 1852

Architecture
- Functional status: Active
- Architect: Hans Linstow
- Architectural type: Long church
- Completed: 1852 (174 years ago)

Specifications
- Capacity: 490
- Materials: Wood

Administration
- Diocese: Stavanger bispedømme
- Deanery: Haugaland prosti
- Parish: Tysvær
- Norwegian Cultural Heritage Site
- Type: Church
- Status: Protected
- ID: 85700

Tysvær Church (Norwegian: Tysvær kyrkje) is a parish church of the Church of Norway in Tysvær Municipality in Rogaland county, Norway. It is located in the village of Tysværvåg. It is the church for the Tysvær parish which is part of the Haugaland prosti (deanery) in the Diocese of Stavanger. The white, wooden church was built in a long church style in 1852 using designs by the architect Hans Linstow. The church seats about 490 people.

== History ==
The earliest existing historical records of the church date back to the year 1338, but the church was not new that year. The old stave church was likely built in the 13th century since the baptismal font is dated back to that time period. In the 1630s, the old church was torn down and replaced with a new church. In 1819, the church was damaged in a storm and it was repaired. In 1852, a new church was constructed right next to the old church, slightly to the northeast. Shortly after the new church was completed, the old church was torn down and its materials were sold at auction.

== See also ==
- List of churches in Rogaland
