= Tysvær (village) =

Village in Tysvær Municipality, Norway

Tysvær Tysværvåg (unofficial)
- Village
- Interactive map of Tysvær
- Coordinates: 59.33204°N 5.48981°E
- Country: Norway
- Region: Western Norway
- County: Rogaland
- District: Haugaland
- Municipality: Tysvær Municipality
- Elevation: 17 m (56 ft)
- Time zone: UTC+01:00 (CET)
  - Summer (DST): UTC+02:00 (CEST)
- Post Code: 5565 Tysværvåg

Tysvær is a village in Tysvær Municipality in Rogaland county, Norway. The village is located at the end of the small Tysværvågen bay, about 2 kilometres (1.2 mi) off of the European route E39 highway. The nearby village of Susort lies about 8 kilometres (5.0 mi) south of the village of Tysvær, the municipal centre of Aksdal lies about 12 kilometres (7.5 mi) to the north, and the village of Hervik lies about 7 kilometres (4.3 mi) to the east. Tysvær Church is located in the village, serving the southwest portion of the municipality.
