= Skjold Church, Rogaland =

Church in Rogaland, Norway

Skjold Church
- Skjold kyrkje
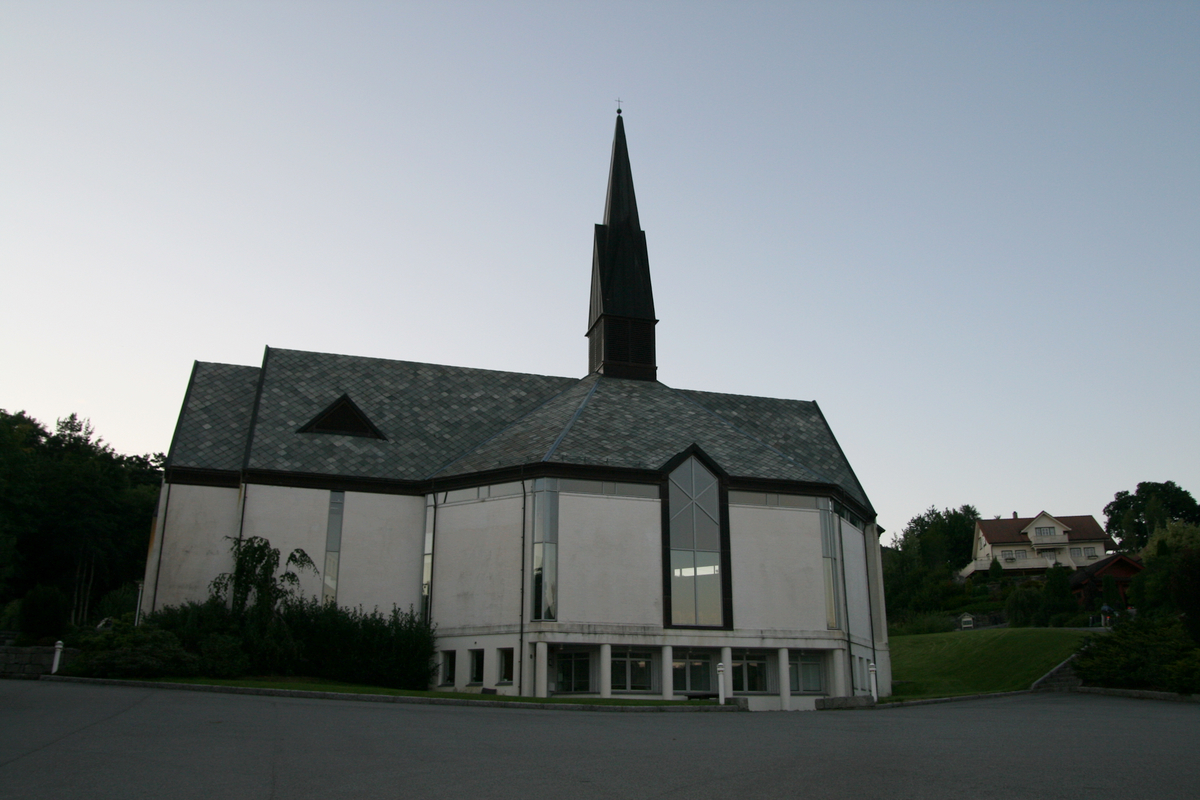
- View of the church Credit: Jarle Vines
- Skjold Church
- 59.505747°N 5.58937°E
- Location: Vindafjord Municipality, Rogaland
- Country: Norway
- Denomination: Church of Norway
- Churchmanship: Evangelical Lutheran

History
- Status: Parish church
- Founded: 13th century
- Consecrated: 16 May 1999
- Events: Fire (1992)

Architecture
- Functional status: Active
- Architect: Nils A. Vikanes
- Architectural type: Octagonal
- Completed: 1998 (28 years ago)

Specifications
- Capacity: 400
- Materials: Stone

Administration
- Diocese: Stavanger bispedømme
- Deanery: Haugaland prosti
- Parish: Skjold

Skjold Church (Norwegian: Skjold kyrkje) is a parish church of the Church of Norway in Vindafjord Municipality in Rogaland county, Norway. It is located in the village of Skjold. It is the church for the Skjold parish which is part of the Haugaland prosti (deanery) in the Diocese of Stavanger. The white, stone church was built in a octagonal design in 1998 using designs by the architect Nils A. Vikanes. The church seats about 400 people.

== History ==
The earliest existing historical records of the church date back to the year 1322, but it was likely founded during the 13th century. The first church in Skjold was a stave church that was located about 500 metres (1,600 ft) east of the present site of the church. In 1645, the old wooden church was torn down and replaced with a new timber-framed cruciform building. In 1768, the church was mostly dismantled and rebuilt - whether or not to consider the result a brand new church or a significant renovation is not known.

In 1814, this church served as an election church (Norwegian: valgkirke). Together with more than 300 other parish churches across Norway, it was a polling station for elections to the 1814 Norwegian Constituent Assembly which wrote the Constitution of Norway. This was Norway's first national elections. Each church parish was a constituency that elected people called "electors" who later met together in each county to elect the representatives for the assembly that was to meet at Eidsvoll Manor later that year.

In 1887, a new church was constructed about 500 metres (1,600 ft) west of the old church. The old church was torn down in 1888 after the new church was in use, and its materials were sold at auction. The new building was consecrated on 26 October 1887. It was a huge timber-framed church that seated about 750 people. It had a long church design with a tower on the west end and a rectangular chancel flanked by sacristies on the east end. Some of the interior furniture was inherited from the previous church including the altarpiece and pulpit (both made in the 1620s).

On 13 September 1992, the church burned to the ground in a fire set by Varg Vikernes and Samoth in a case of deliberate arson. The church was replaced in 1998 by the present church building that was designed by Nils Vikanes. The new octagonal church was consecrated on 16 May 1999. The nave has white painted walls and red floor tiles and is furnished with chairs. The choir in the east is raised a few steps above the nave. There is a balcony with seating above the main entrance.

== Media gallery ==
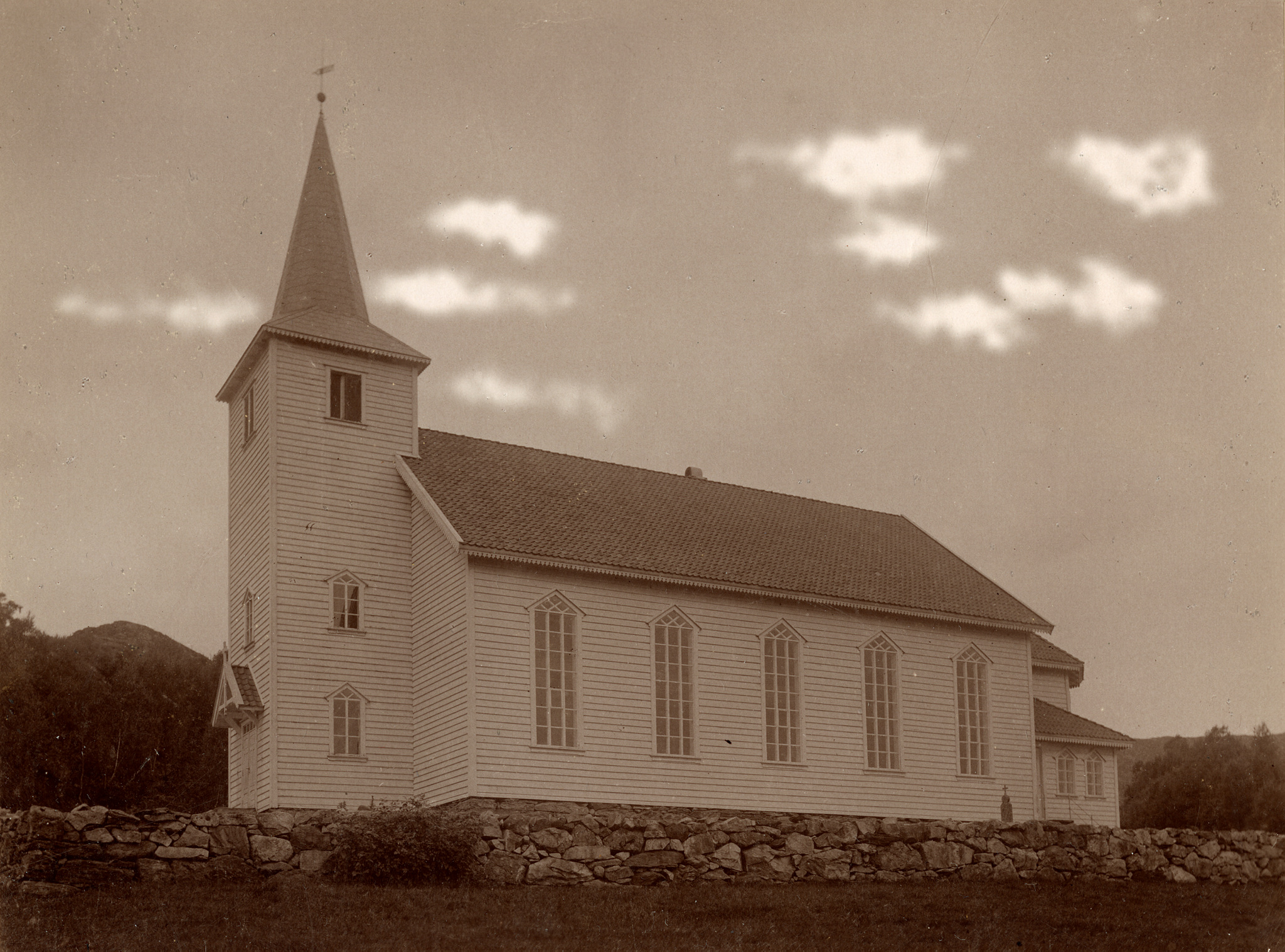
Exterior of the old church (1887-1992)

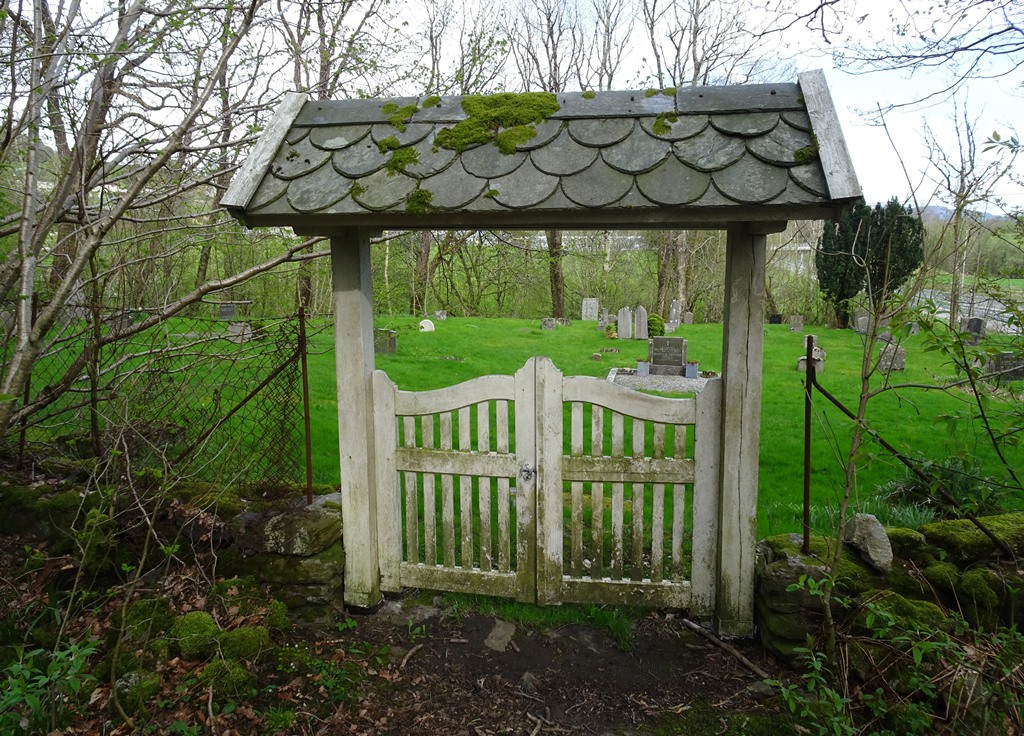
Entrance to the cemetery at the old church

== See also ==
- List of churches in Rogaland
