= Hervik =

Village in Tysvær Municipality, Norway

- Village
- Interactive map of Hervik
- Coordinates: 59.32413°N 5.59359°E
- Country: Norway
- Region: Western Norway
- County: Rogaland
- District: Haugaland
- Municipality: Tysvær Municipality
- Elevation: 25 m (82 ft)
- Time zone: UTC+01:00 (CET)
  - Summer (DST): UTC+02:00 (CEST)
- Post Code: 5566 Hervik

Hervik is a village in Tysvær Municipality in Rogaland county, Norway. The village is located on the western shore of the Herviksfjorden, about 6 kilometres (3.7 mi) east of the village of Tysværvåg and about 8 kilometres (5.0 mi) northeast of the Kårstø industrial site. The village is known for production of fruit syrup, juice, and jam. Products are sold by mail order, at 7-Eleven and in delicatessens nationwide in Norway.

== History ==
The village has been populated since around the 14th century and has grave sites dating from the Bronze Age. The name Hervik is etymologically connected to Harwich in England, Here-wic, which means a cove (vík in Old Norse) populated by an army (hær in Norwegian). In medieval sources the village is known as Heruicum.
