= Nedstrand Church =

Church in Rogaland, Norway

- Nedstrand kyrkje
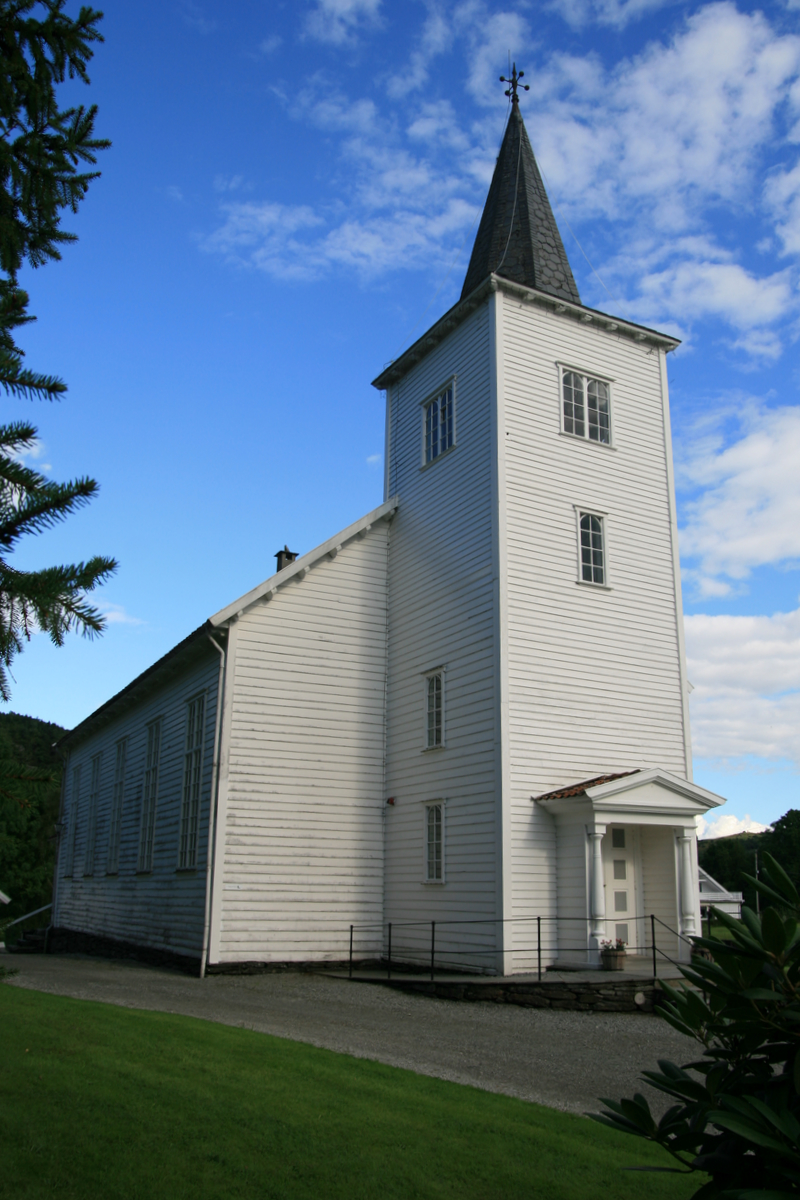
- View of the church Credit: Jarle Vines
- Nedstrand Church
- 59°20′59″N 5°48′01″E
- Location: Tysvær Municipality, Rogaland
- Country: Norway
- Denomination: Church of Norway
- Churchmanship: Evangelical Lutheran

History
- Former name: Hindaraa kirke
- Status: Parish church
- Founded: 12th century
- Consecrated: 1868

Architecture
- Functional status: Active
- Architect(s): C.F. von der Lippe and Hans Linstow
- Architectural type: Long church
- Completed: 1868 (158 years ago)

Specifications
- Capacity: 480
- Materials: Wood

Administration
- Diocese: Stavanger bispedømme
- Deanery: Haugaland prosti
- Parish: Nedstrand
- Norwegian Cultural Heritage Site
- Type: Church
- Status: Protected
- ID: 44804

Nedstrand Church (Nynorsk: Nedstrand kyrkje; historic: Hindaraa kirke) is a parish church of the Church of Norway in Tysvær Municipality in Rogaland county, Norway. It is located in the village of Hindaråvåg. It is one of the two churches for the Nedstrand parish which is part of the Haugaland prosti (deanery) in the Diocese of Stavanger. The white, wooden church was built in a long church style in 1868 using designs by the architects Conrad Fredrik von der Lippe and Hans Linstow. The church seats about 480 people.

== History ==
The earliest existing historical records of the church date back to the year 1280, but it was not new that year, it may have been built as early as the 12th century. The first church here was likely a stave church that was located at the mouth of the river Hindaråa, about 180 metres (590 ft) east of the present location of the church. The church was originally called Hindaraa Church (until 1881). In 1656, the old church was torn down and replaced with a new building (or instead it may have been heavily renovated and rebuilt).

In 1814, this church served as an election church (Norwegian: valgkirke). Together with more than 300 other parish churches across Norway, it was a polling station for elections to the 1814 Norwegian Constituent Assembly which wrote the Constitution of Norway. This was Norway's first national elections. Each church parish was a constituency that elected people called "electors" who later met together in each county to elect the representatives for the assembly that was to meet at Eidsvoll Manor later that year.

In 1868, a new church was built on the other side of the river at the intersection of two roads, about 180 metres (590 ft) to the west. After the new church was completed, the old church was torn down. In 1881, the church and parish was renamed Nedstrand because the name Hindaraa had fallen out of regular use and the area was better known for the nearby coastal village, Nedstrand.

== See also ==
- List of churches in Rogaland
