= Skjold, Rogaland =

Village in Vindafjord Municipality, Norway

Skjold
- Village
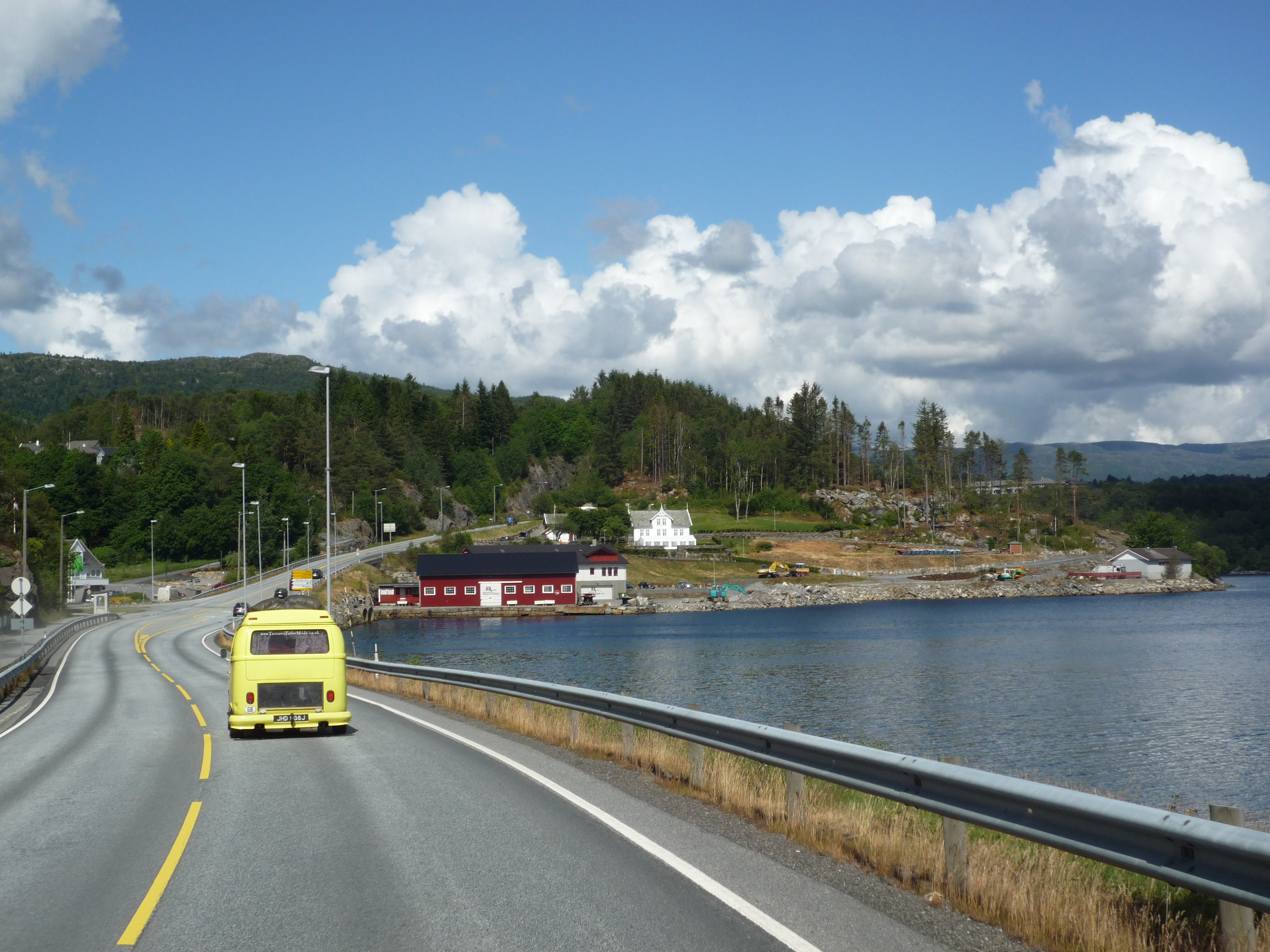
- View of the highway passing near the village
- Interactive map of Skjold
- Coordinates: 59.50273°N 5.58687°E
- Country: Norway
- Region: Western Norway
- County: Rogaland
- District: Haugaland
- Municipality: Vindafjord Municipality

Area
  - Total: 1.02 km^{2} (0.39 sq mi)
- Elevation: 10 m (33 ft)

Population (2025)
  - Total: 997
  - Density: 977/km^{2} (2,530/sq mi)
- Time zone: UTC+01:00 (CET)
  - Summer (DST): UTC+02:00 (CEST)
- Post Code: 5574 Skjold

Skjold is a village in Vindafjord Municipality in Rogaland county, Norway. The village is located at the northern end of the Skjoldafjorden, along the European route E134 highway, about 25 kilometres (16 mi) northeast of the town of Haugesund. Skjold Church is located in the village. The small Elleflåt farm lies about 4 kilometres (2.5 mi) northeast of Skjold.

The 1.02-square-kilometre (250-acre) village has a population (2025) of 997 and a population density of 977 inhabitants per square kilometre (2,530/sq mi).

== History ==
The village was the administrative centre of the old Skjold Municipality which existed from 1838 until 1965.
