= Tysvær Municipality =

Municipality in Rogaland, Norway

Tysvær Municipality Tysvær kommune
- Municipality
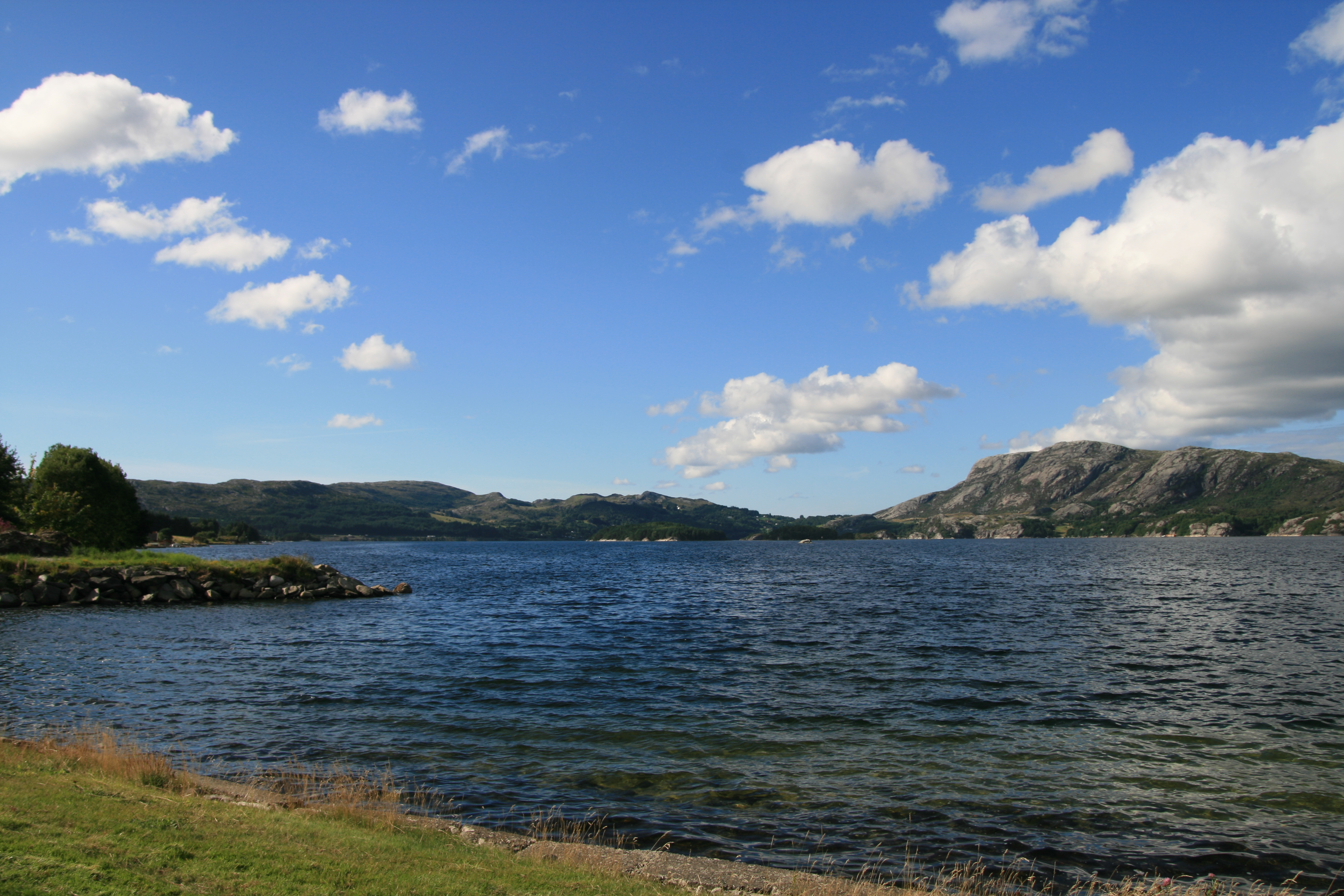
- View of the lake Aksdalsvatnet

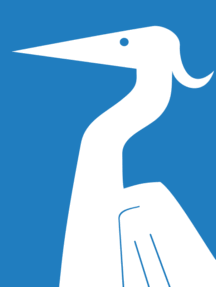
- Flag Coat of arms

- Rogaland within Norway

- Tysvær within Rogaland
- Coordinates: 59°21′42″N 05°32′34″E
- Country: Norway
- County: Rogaland
- District: Haugaland
- Established: 1849
  - Preceded by: Skjold Municipality
- Administrative centre: Aksdal

Government
  - Mayor (2023): Monika Lindanger (H)

Area
  - Total: 425.53 km^{2} (164.30 sq mi)
  - Land: 400.16 km^{2} (154.50 sq mi)
  - Water: 25.37 km^{2} (9.80 sq mi) 6%
  - Rank: #230 in Norway
- Highest elevation: 630.67 m (2,069.1 ft)

Population (2026)
  - Total: 11,750
  - Rank: #100 in Norway
  - Density: 27.6/km^{2} (71/sq mi)
  - Change (10 years): ▲ +7.6%
- Demonym: Tysværbu

Official language
  - Norwegian form: Neutral
- Time zone: UTC+01:00 (CET)
  - Summer (DST): UTC+02:00 (CEST)
- ISO 3166 code: NO-1146
- Website: Official website

Tysvær is a municipality in Rogaland county, Norway. It is part of the Haugalandet region. The municipality is located on the Haugalandet peninsula on the northern side of the Boknafjorden, just east of the towns of Kopervik and Haugesund. The administrative centre of the municipality is the village of Aksdal. Other villages in the municipality include Dueland, Førre, Grinde, Hervik, Hindaråvåg, Nedstrand, Skjoldastraumen, Susort, Tysvær, and Yrkje.

The 425.53-square-kilometre (164.30 sq mi) municipality is the 230th largest by area out of the 357 municipalities in Norway. Tysvær Municipality is the 100th most populous municipality in Norway with a population of 11,750. The municipality's population density is 27.6 inhabitants per square kilometre (71/sq mi) and its population has increased by 7.6% over the previous 10-year period.

The European route E39 highway and European route E134 highways traverse the municipality with their junction located at Aksdal. The Frekasund Bridge on the E39 highway connects the mainland of Tysvær Municipality to the islands of Bokn Municipality to the south. The Karmøy Tunnel connects Tysvær Municipality to the town of Kopervik in neighboring Karmøy Municipality.

== General information ==
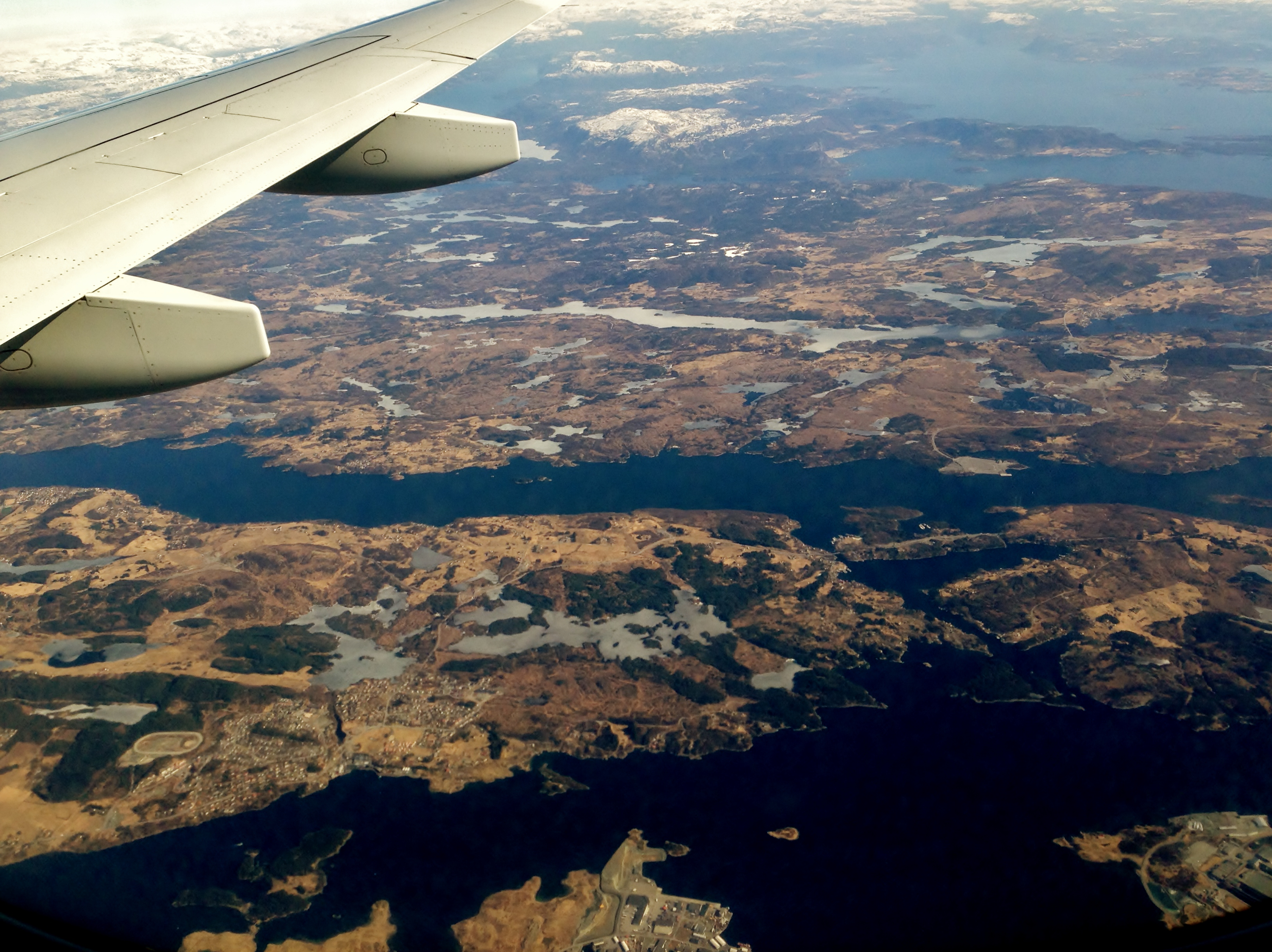
Aerial view of western Tysvær

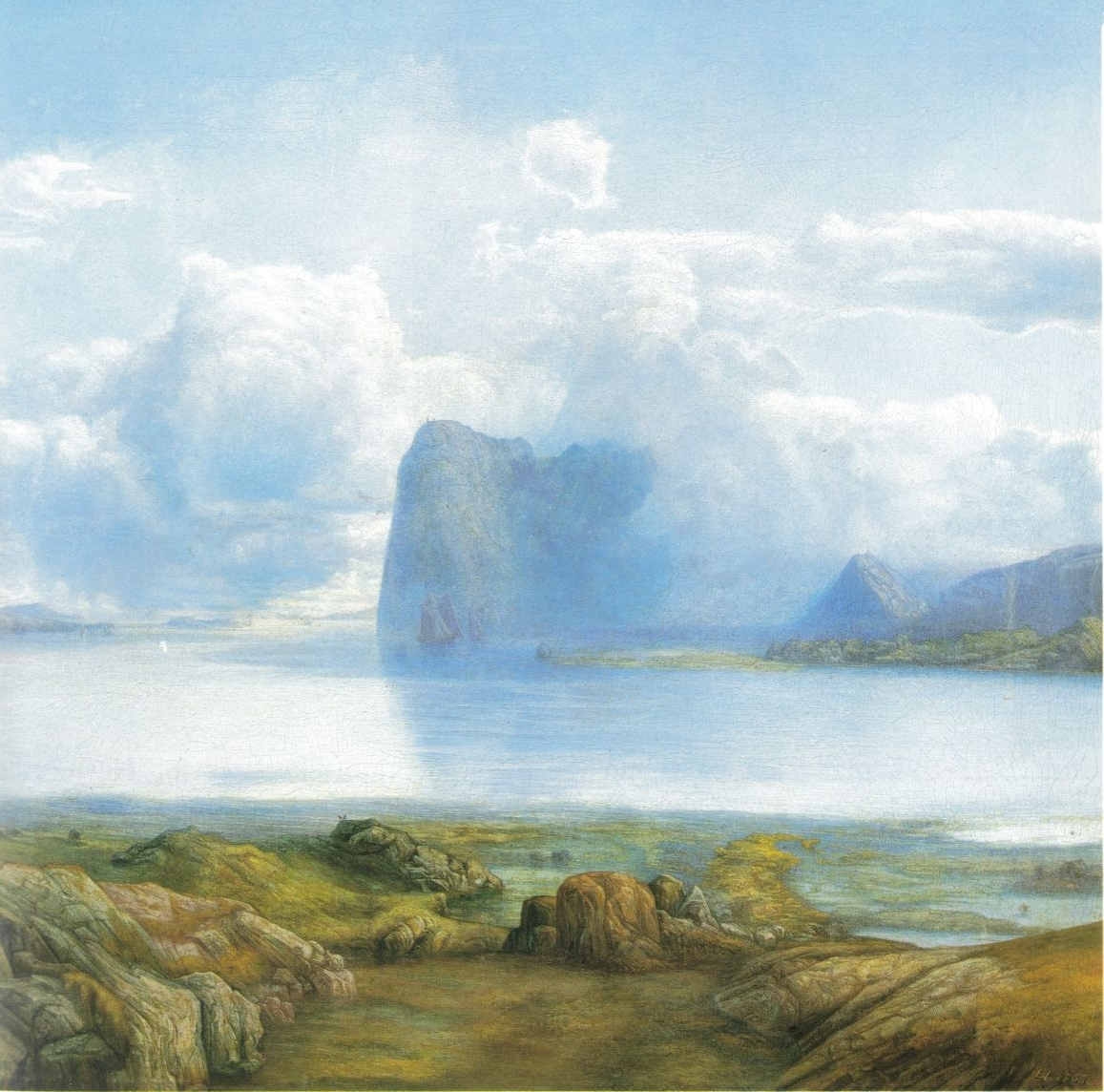
Painting called Fra Borgøya by Lars Hertervig

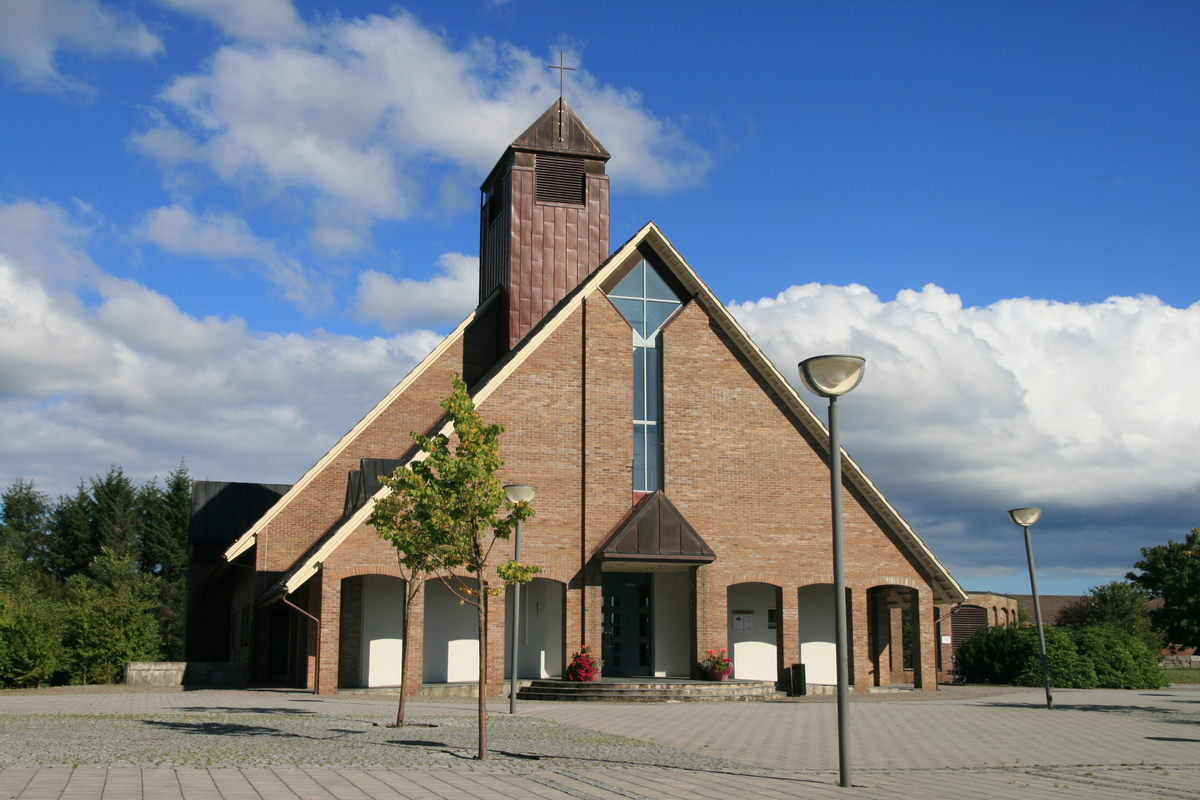
View of Aksdal Church

The municipality of Tysvær was established in 1849 when the large Skjold Municipality was divided. The southern part (population: 2,058) became the new Tysvær Municipality and the northern part (population: 3,439) remained as a smaller Skjold Municipality.

During the 1960s, there were many municipal mergers across Norway due to the work of the Schei Committee. On 1 January 1965, the following areas were merged into a newly enlarged Tysvær Municipality:

- all of Tysvær Municipality (population: 1,862)
- all of Nedstrand Municipality (population: 1,200)
- the Gismarvik, Førre, and Stegaberg areas of Avaldsnes Municipality (population: 994)
- the Grinde, Dueland, and Yrkje areas of Skjold Municipality (population: 1,133)
- the Breidal and Stølsvik farms from Vats Municipality (population: 16)
- the Hapnes and Dokskar farms from Vikedal Municipality (population: 2)

On 1 January 1969, the small Sponevik farm area (population: 6), just north of the village of Skjoldastraumen, was transferred from the neighboring Vindafjord Municipality to Tysvær Municipality.

=== Name ===
The municipality (originally the parish) is named after the old Tysvær farm (Old Norse: Teitsfjörðr) since the first Tysvær Church was built there. The first element is the genitive case of the old male name Teitr. The last element is fjörðr which means "fjord". Over time, the last element was corrupted to vær which means "fishing village", but that was not the meaning of the original name.

=== Coat of arms ===
The coat of arms was granted on 3 February 1984. The official blazon is "Azure, a heron argent issuant" (Norwegian: På blå grunn ein oppveksande sølv hegre). This means the arms have a blue field (background) and the charge is the top of a grey heron. The heron has a tincture of argent which means it is commonly colored white, but if it is made out of metal, then silver is used. The heron was chosen as a symbol for the municipality since there are several large colonies of grey herons in the municipality. "Tysvær herons" is a nickname for the inhabitants of the municipality. The arms were designed by Stein Davidsen. The municipal flag has the same design as the coat of arms.

=== Churches ===
The Church of Norway has three parishes (sokn) within Tysvær Municipality. It is part of the Haugaland prosti (deanery) in the Diocese of Stavanger.

Churches in Tysvær Municipality
Parish (sokn)	Church name	Location of the church	Year built
Førresfjorden	Aksdal Church	Aksdal	1995
Førresfjorden	Førre Church	Førre	1893
Nedstrand	Nedstrand Church	Hindaråvåg	1868
Nedstrand	Skjoldastraumen Church	Skjoldastraumen	1910
Tysvær	Tysvær Church	Tysvær	1852

== Geography ==
The municipality lies on the northern shore of the Boknafjorden, with the Skjoldafjorden and Vindafjorden both partially located within the municipality. The island of Borgøyna lies in the middle of the Skjoldafjorden in Tysvær Municipality. The highest point in the municipality is the 630.67-metre (2,069.1 ft) tall mountain Lammanuten.

The lake Aksdalsvatnet is the largest lake in the municipality. Another notable lake is Stakkastadvatnet, which lies on the Haugesund-Tysvær municipal border. Tysvær has a number of scenic walks including Heggelifjellet and Kvinnesland.

Sveio Municipality (in Vestland county) is located to the north, Vindafjord Municipality is located to the northeast, Suldal Municipality is located to the east, the islands of Stavanger Municipality are located to the south, Bokn Municipality is located to the southwest, Karmøy Municipality is located to the west, and Haugesund Municipality is located to the northwest.

== Economy ==
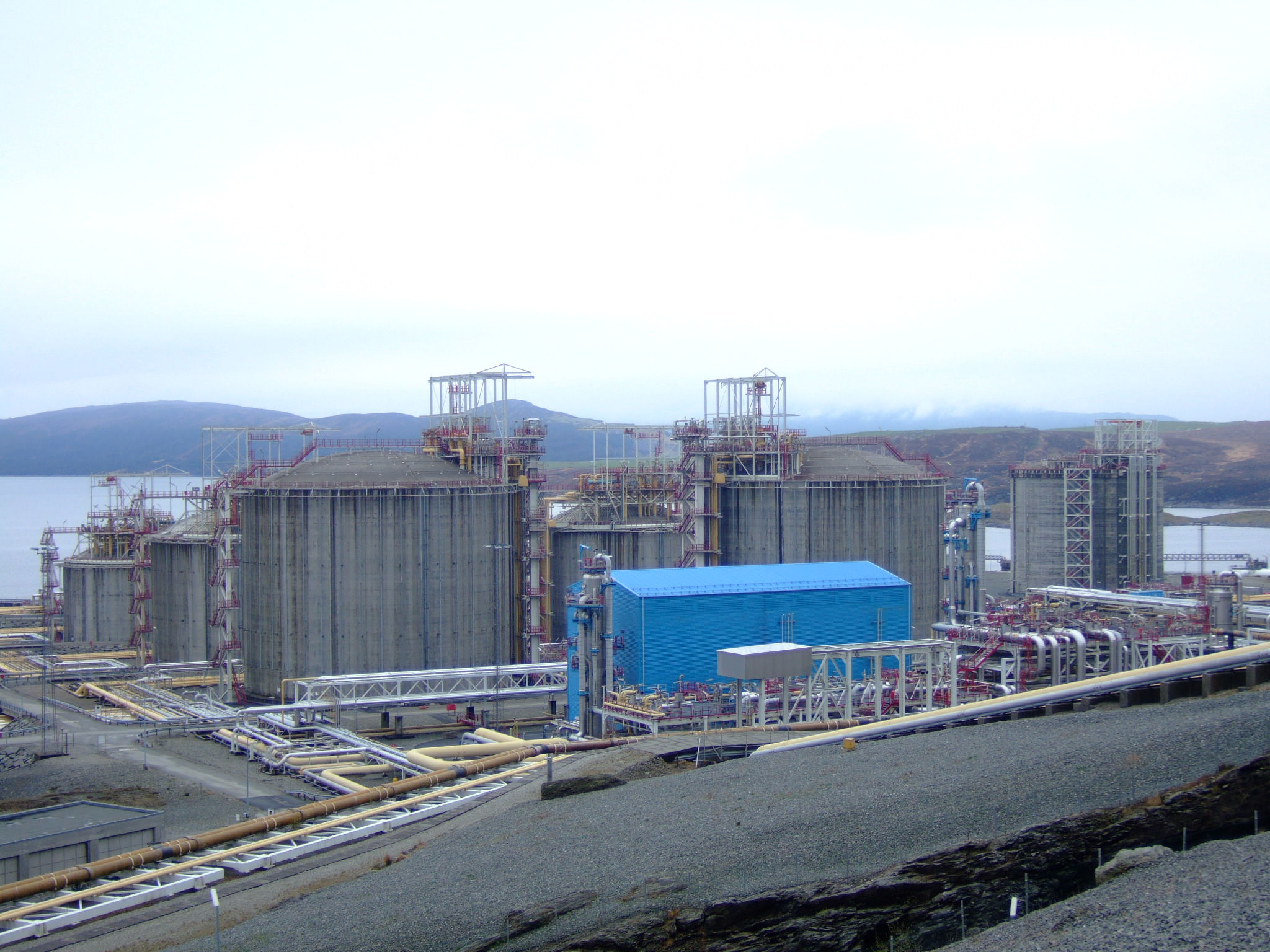
View of Kårstø

The Kårstø industrial site is located along the shores of the Boknafjorden in southwestern Tysvær. The site has many natural gas-related facilities including the Kårstø Power Station.

== Government ==
Tysvær Municipality is responsible for primary education (through 10th grade), outpatient health services, senior citizen services, welfare and other social services, zoning, economic development, and municipal roads and utilities. The municipality is governed by a municipal council of directly elected representatives. The mayor is indirectly elected by a vote of the municipal council. The municipality is under the jurisdiction of the Haugaland og Sunnhordland District Court and the Gulating Court of Appeal.

=== Municipal council ===
The municipal council (Kommunestyre) of Tysvær Municipality is made up of 29 representatives that are elected to four-year terms. The tables below show the current and historical composition of the council by political party.

Tysvær kommunestyre 2023–2027
Party name (in Nynorsk)	Number of representatives
Labour Party (Arbeidarpartiet)	5
Progress Party (Framstegspartiet)	5
Conservative Party (Høgre)	6
Industry and Business Party (Industri‑ og Næringspartiet)	3
Christian Democratic Party (Kristeleg Folkeparti)	3
Norway Democrats (Noregsdemokratane)	1
Centre Party (Senterpartiet)	4
Socialist Left Party (Sosialistisk Venstreparti)	1
Liberal Party (Venstre)	1
Total number of members:	29

Tysvær kommunestyre 2019–2023
Party name (in Nynorsk)	Number of representatives
Labour Party (Arbeidarpartiet)	9
Progress Party (Framstegspartiet)	3
Conservative Party (Høgre)	6
Christian Democratic Party (Kristeleg Folkeparti)	3
Centre Party (Senterpartiet)	6
Socialist Left Party (Sosialistisk Venstreparti)	1
Liberal Party (Venstre)	1
Total number of members:	29

Tysvær kommunestyre 2015–2019
Party name (in Nynorsk)	Number of representatives
Labour Party (Arbeidarpartiet)	10
Progress Party (Framstegspartiet)	4
Conservative Party (Høgre)	6
Christian Democratic Party (Kristeleg Folkeparti)	4
Centre Party (Senterpartiet)	4
Liberal Party (Venstre)	1
Total number of members:	29

Tysvær kommunestyre 2011–2015
Party name (in Nynorsk)	Number of representatives
Labour Party (Arbeidarpartiet)	7
Progress Party (Framstegspartiet)	4
Conservative Party (Høgre)	9
Christian Democratic Party (Kristeleg Folkeparti)	4
Centre Party (Senterpartiet)	3
Liberal Party (Venstre)	2
Total number of members:	29

Tysvær kommunestyre 2007–2011
Party name (in Nynorsk)	Number of representatives
Labour Party (Arbeidarpartiet)	6
Progress Party (Framstegspartiet)	7
Conservative Party (Høgre)	6
Christian Democratic Party (Kristeleg Folkeparti)	4
Centre Party (Senterpartiet)	4
Socialist Left Party (Sosialistisk Venstreparti)	1
Liberal Party (Venstre)	1
Total number of members:	29

Tysvær kommunestyre 2003–2007
Party name (in Nynorsk)	Number of representatives
Labour Party (Arbeidarpartiet)	6
Progress Party (Framstegspartiet)	6
Conservative Party (Høgre)	5
Christian Democratic Party (Kristeleg Folkeparti)	5
Centre Party (Senterpartiet)	4
Socialist Left Party (Sosialistisk Venstreparti)	2
Liberal Party (Venstre)	1
Total number of members:	29

Tysvær kommunestyre 1999–2003
Party name (in Nynorsk)	Number of representatives
Labour Party (Arbeidarpartiet)	8
Progress Party (Framstegspartiet)	4
Conservative Party (Høgre)	7
Christian Democratic Party (Kristeleg Folkeparti)	9
Centre Party (Senterpartiet)	4
Liberal Party (Venstre)	2
Cross-party list (Tverrpolitisk liste)	1
Total number of members:	35

Tysvær kommunestyre 1995–1999
Party name (in Nynorsk)	Number of representatives
Labour Party (Arbeidarpartiet)	7
Progress Party (Framstegspartiet)	3
Conservative Party (Høgre)	5
Christian Democratic Party (Kristeleg Folkeparti)	7
Pensioners' Party (Pensjonistpartiet)	1
Centre Party (Senterpartiet)	7
Liberal Party (Venstre)	5
Total number of members:	35

Tysvær kommunestyre 1991–1995
Party name (in Nynorsk)	Number of representatives
Labour Party (Arbeidarpartiet)	7
Conservative Party (Høgre)	6
Christian Democratic Party (Kristeleg Folkeparti)	8
Centre Party (Senterpartiet)	7
Liberal Party (Venstre)	6
Nedstrand local list (Nedstrand bygdeliste)	1
Total number of members:	35

Tysvær kommunestyre 1987–1991
Party name (in Nynorsk)	Number of representatives
Labour Party (Arbeidarpartiet)	8
Progress Party (Framstegspartiet)	3
Conservative Party (Høgre)	6
Christian Democratic Party (Kristeleg Folkeparti)	7
Centre Party (Senterpartiet)	4
Liberal Party (Venstre)	6
Nedstrand local list (Nedstrand bygdeliste)	1
Total number of members:	35

Tysvær kommunestyre 1983–1987
Party name (in Nynorsk)	Number of representatives
Labour Party (Arbeidarpartiet)	7
Progress Party (Framstegspartiet)	3
Conservative Party (Høgre)	7
Christian Democratic Party (Kristeleg Folkeparti)	7
Centre Party (Senterpartiet)	5
Liberal Party (Venstre)	5
Nedstrand local list (Nedstrand bygdeliste)	1
Total number of members:	35

Tysvær kommunestyre 1979–1983
Party name (in Nynorsk)	Number of representatives
Labour Party (Arbeidarpartiet)	5
Conservative Party (Høgre)	9
Christian Democratic Party (Kristeleg Folkeparti)	7
Centre Party (Senterpartiet)	6
Liberal Party (Venstre)	4
Nedstrand local list (Nedstrand bygdeliste)	2
Total number of members:	33

Tysvær kommunestyre 1975–1979
Party name (in Nynorsk)	Number of representatives
Labour Party (Arbeidarpartiet)	6
Conservative Party (Høgre)	4
Christian Democratic Party (Kristeleg Folkeparti)	9
Centre Party (Senterpartiet)	8
Socialist Left Party (Sosialistisk Venstreparti)	1
Liberal Party (Venstre)	5
Total number of members:	33

Tysvær kommunestyre 1971–1975
Party name (in Nynorsk)	Number of representatives
Labour Party (Arbeidarpartiet)	6
Conservative Party (Høgre)	3
Christian Democratic Party (Kristeleg Folkeparti)	8
Centre Party (Senterpartiet)	8
Liberal Party (Venstre)	7
Total number of members:	33

Tysvær kommunestyre 1967–1971
Party name (in Nynorsk)	Number of representatives
Labour Party (Arbeidarpartiet)	6
Conservative Party (Høgre)	3
Christian Democratic Party (Kristeleg Folkeparti)	7
Centre Party (Senterpartiet)	8
Liberal Party (Venstre)	8
Total number of members:	33

Tysvær kommunestyre 1963–1967
Party name (in Nynorsk)	Number of representatives
Labour Party (Arbeidarpartiet)	3
Christian Democratic Party (Kristeleg Folkeparti)	5
Centre Party (Senterpartiet)	4
Liberal Party (Venstre)	5
Total number of members:	17

Tysvær heradsstyre 1959–1963
Party name (in Nynorsk)	Number of representatives
Labour Party (Arbeidarpartiet)	2
Christian Democratic Party (Kristeleg Folkeparti)	5
Centre Party (Senterpartiet)	5
Liberal Party (Venstre)	5
Total number of members:	17

Tysvær heradsstyre 1955–1959
Party name (in Nynorsk)	Number of representatives
Labour Party (Arbeidarpartiet)	2
Christian Democratic Party (Kristeleg Folkeparti)	7
Farmers' Party (Bondepartiet)	4
Liberal Party (Venstre)	3
List of workers, fishermen, and small farmholders (Arbeidarar, fiskarar, småbrukarar liste)	1
Total number of members:	17

Tysvær heradsstyre 1951–1955
Party name (in Nynorsk)	Number of representatives
Joint List(s) of Non-Socialist Parties (Borgarlege Felleslister)	6
Local List(s) (Lokale lister)	10
Total number of members:	16

Tysvær heradsstyre 1947–1951
Party name (in Nynorsk)	Number of representatives
Labour Party (Arbeidarpartiet)	3
Joint List(s) of Non-Socialist Parties (Borgarlege Felleslister)	10
Local List(s) (Lokale lister)	3
Total number of members:	16

Tysvær heradsstyre 1945–1947
Party name (in Nynorsk)	Number of representatives
Local List(s) (Lokale lister)	16
Total number of members:	16

Tysvær heradsstyre 1937–1941*
Party name (in Nynorsk)	Number of representatives
Labour Party (Arbeidarpartiet)	1
List of workers, fishermen, and small farmholders (Arbeidarar, fiskarar, småbrukarar liste)	4
Joint List(s) of Non-Socialist Parties (Borgarlege Felleslister)	11
Total number of members:	16
Note: Due to the German occupation of Norway during World War II, no elections were held for new municipal councils until after the war ended in 1945.

=== Mayors ===
The mayor (Nynorsk: ordførar) of Tysvær Municipality is the political leader of the municipality and the chairperson of the municipal council. The following people have held this position:

- 1849–1849: Peder Christophersen Lien
- 1850–1851: John Pedersen Aarvig
- 1852–1853: Rev. Hans Jensen Blom
- 1854–1854: Thomas Jørgensen Qvindesland
- 1855–1855: Rev. Hans Jensen Blom
- 1856–1857: Thomas Jørgensen Qvindesland
- 1858–1859: Christofer Chr. Hervig
- 1860–1861: Sjur S. Høivig
- 1862–1865: Thomas Jørgensen Qvindesland
- 1866–1866: Lars Eriksen Birk
- 1867–1868: Jakob Severinsen Odland
- 1868–1871: Ole O. Melkevig
- 1872–1873: Sjur V. Elleflaadt
- 1874–1879: Lars Eriksen Birk
- 1880–1881: Nils A. Hetland
- 1882–1883: Christoffer J. Apeland
- 1884–1887: Lars Eriksen Birk
- 1888–1891: John Kvinnesland
- 1892–1895: Peder J. Aarvig
- 1896–1907: Christoffer Apeland
- 1908–1913: Kornelius Jørgensen
- 1913–1921: Tollef Kvinnesland
- 1922–1922: Johannes Høyland
- 1923–1925: Berdinius Hervik
- 1926–1928: Johannes Høyland
- 1929–1931: Knut C. Rønnevik
- 1931–1935: Sivert Odland
- 1935–1942: Knut C. Rønnevik
- 1942–1945: Ole Hay Hoel (NS)
- 1945–1947: Knut C. Rønnevik
- 1947–1951: Tor Eikje
- 1951–1955: Knut C. Rønnevik
- 1955–1959: Ånen Susort (KrF)
- 1959–1963: Elmer Førland (V)
- 1963–1964: Ånen Susort (KrF)
- 1964–1967: Lars Mogstad (Sp)
- 1967–1975: John S. Tveit (KrF)
- 1975–1979: Andreas Stakkestad (Sp)
- 1979–1983: Mandrup Hovland (V)
- 1983–1987: Borghild Yrkje (KrF)
- 1987–1991: Mandrup Hovland (V)
- 1991–1999: Borghild Yrkje (KrF)
- 1999–2007: Reidar Pedersen (Ap)
- 2007–2015: Harald Stakkestad (H)
- 2015–2023: Sigmund Lier (Ap)
- 2023–present: Monika Lindanger (H)

== Notable people ==
- Cleng Peerson (1783 near Tysvær – 1865), the leader of the first group of Norwegians to emigrate to the United States
- Anders Andersen Bjelland (1790 in Nedstrand – 1850), a farmer and politician
- Asbjørn Kloster (1823 in Vestre Bokn – 1876), a social reformer and leader of the Norwegian temperance movement
- Lars Hertervig (1830 at Borgøy – 1902), a painter of semi-fantastical works of coastal landscapes
- John S. Tveit (born 1931 in Tysvær), a politician who was mayor of Tysvær Municipality from 1967 to 1971
- Nils Olav Fjeldheim (born 1977 in Tysværvåg), a sprint and marathon canoeist who was a bronze medallist in the 2004 Summer Olympics
- Peder Losnegård (born 1992 in Tysvær) whose stage name is Lido, a hip-hop artist, rapper, producer, and songwriter
