= Susort =

Village in Tysvær Municipality, Norway

- Village
- Interactive map of Susort
- Coordinates: 59.28172°N 5.47612°E
- Country: Norway
- Region: Western Norway
- County: Rogaland
- District: Haugaland
- Municipality: Tysvær Municipality
- Elevation: 37 m (121 ft)
- Time zone: UTC+01:00 (CET)
  - Summer (DST): UTC+02:00 (CEST)
- Post Code: 5565 Tysværvåg

Susort is a village in Tysvær Municipality in Rogaland county, Norway. The village is located along the eastern shore of the Førlandsfjorden, about 5 kilometres (3.1 mi) south of the village of Tysvær. The European route E39 highway runs just outside the village. The word is an old version of the word svarttrost which means "blackbird".

For a long time, Susort was a place where people moved away from, until more recently. The large Kårstø industrial site and the Kårstø Power Station both lie just 2 kilometres (1.2 mi) southeast of Susort, and since that area was developed in the 1980s, many houses have been built in Susort to house the people who work nearby.
