= Skjoldastraumen =

Village in Tysvær Municipality, Norway

- Village
- Interactive map of Skjoldastraumen
- Coordinates: 59.43209°N 5.61327°E
- Country: Norway
- Region: Western Norway
- County: Rogaland
- District: Haugaland
- Municipality: Tysvær Municipality
- Elevation: 29 m (95 ft)
- Time zone: UTC+01:00 (CET)
  - Summer (DST): UTC+02:00 (CEST)
- Post Code: 5567 Skjoldastraumen

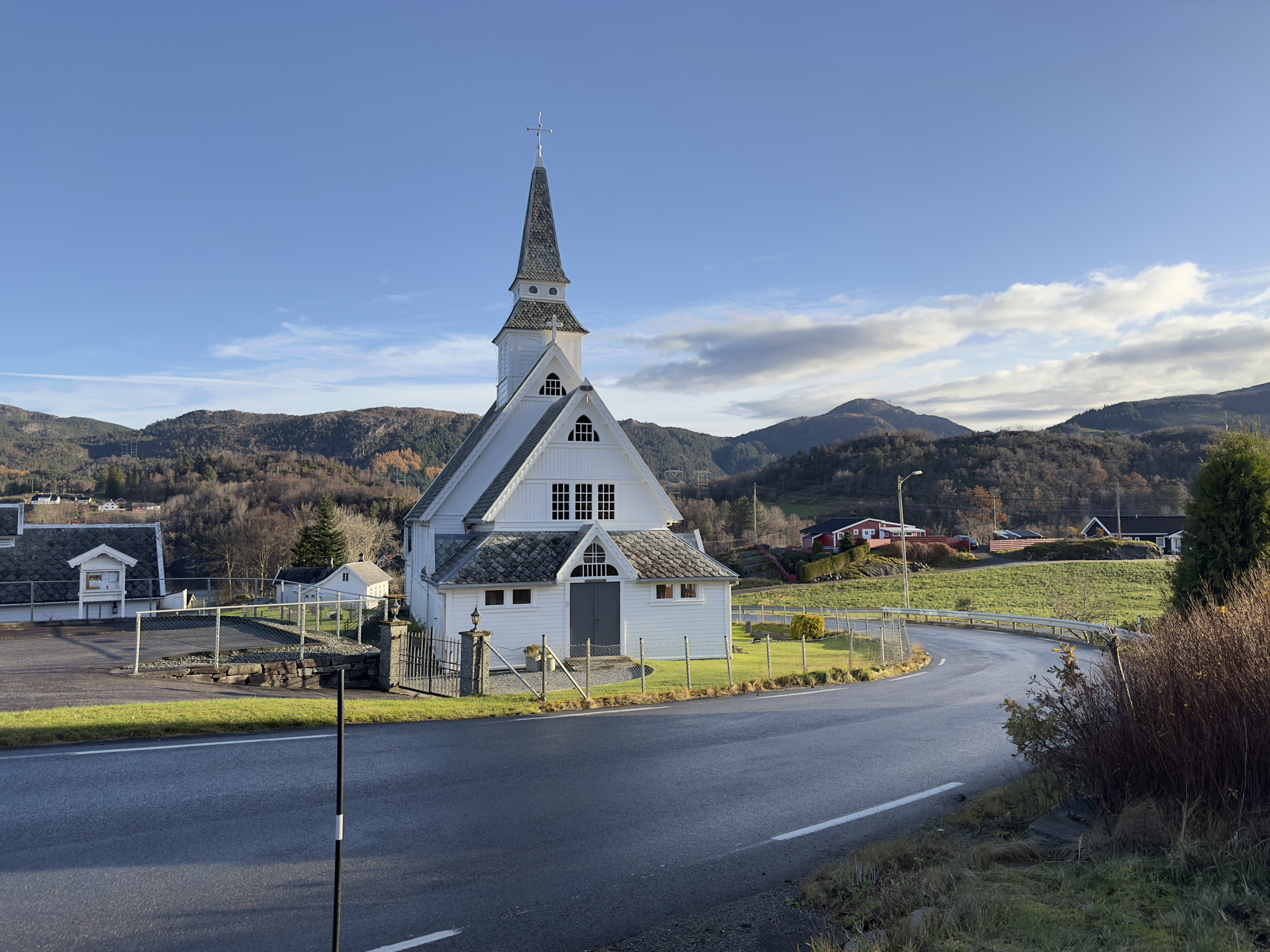
Street view of Skjoldastraumen Church

Skjoldastraumen is a village in Tysvær Municipality in Rogaland county, Norway. The village is located along the Skjoldafjorden, about 10 kilometres (6.2 mi) east of the village of Grinde and about 5 kilometres (3.1 mi) northwest of the small village of Yrkje. The village lies on one of the narrowest parts of the fjord, and is the location of one of the only actively-used seawater locks in Norway. The village is the site of the Skjoldastraumen Church, a wooden structure built in a long church style in 1910.
