= Aksdal =

Village in Tysvær Municipality, Norway

- Village
- Interactive map of Aksdal
- Coordinates: 59.42402°N 5.44565°E
- Country: Norway
- Region: Western Norway
- County: Rogaland
- District: Haugaland
- Municipality: Tysvær Municipality

Area
  - Total: 0.45 km^{2} (0.17 sq mi)
- Elevation: 41 m (135 ft)

Population (2025)
  - Total: 837
  - Density: 1,860/km^{2} (4,800/sq mi)
- Time zone: UTC+01:00 (CET)
  - Summer (DST): UTC+02:00 (CEST)
- Post Code: 5570 Aksdal

Aksdal is a village and the administrative centre of Tysvær Municipality in Rogaland county, Norway. The village is located on the northern shore of the large lake Aksdalsvatnet, at the junction of the European route E134 and European route E39 highways. The village of Førre lies about 3 kilometres (1.9 mi) to the west of Aksdal and the village of Grinde lies about 1.5 kilometres (0.93 mi) to the east. Aksdal Church is located in Aksdal.

The 0.45-square-kilometre (110-acre) village has a population (2025) of 837 and a population density of 1,860 inhabitants per square kilometre (4,800/sq mi).
