= Hindaråvåg =

Village in Tysvær Municipality, Norway

- Village
- Interactive map of Hindaråvåg
- Coordinates: 59.34799°N 5.79978°E
- Country: Norway
- Region: Western Norway
- County: Rogaland
- District: Haugaland
- Municipality: Tysvær Municipality
- Elevation: 10 m (33 ft)
- Time zone: UTC+01:00 (CET)
  - Summer (DST): UTC+02:00 (CEST)
- Post Code: 5560 Nedstrand

Hindaråvåg is a village in Tysvær Municipality in Rogaland county, Norway. The village is located along the Nedstrandsfjorden, on the southern coast of the municipality. The village of Nedstrand lies about 3 kilometres (1.9 mi) east of Hindaråvåg and is one of the most picturesque white-wood-house-villages in the fjord-region. Historically, the village was located in the old Nedstrand Municipality.

The village is the site of Nedstrand Church. The Tveit Upper Secondary School is also located here. This school is the only agriculture school in Rogaland county. There used to be a zip-line park located near the fjord, just south of Hindaråvåg called Høyt & Lavt Nedstrand. The zip lines reached up to a height of 19 metres (62 ft).
