= Skjoldafjorden =

Fjord in Rogaland, Norway

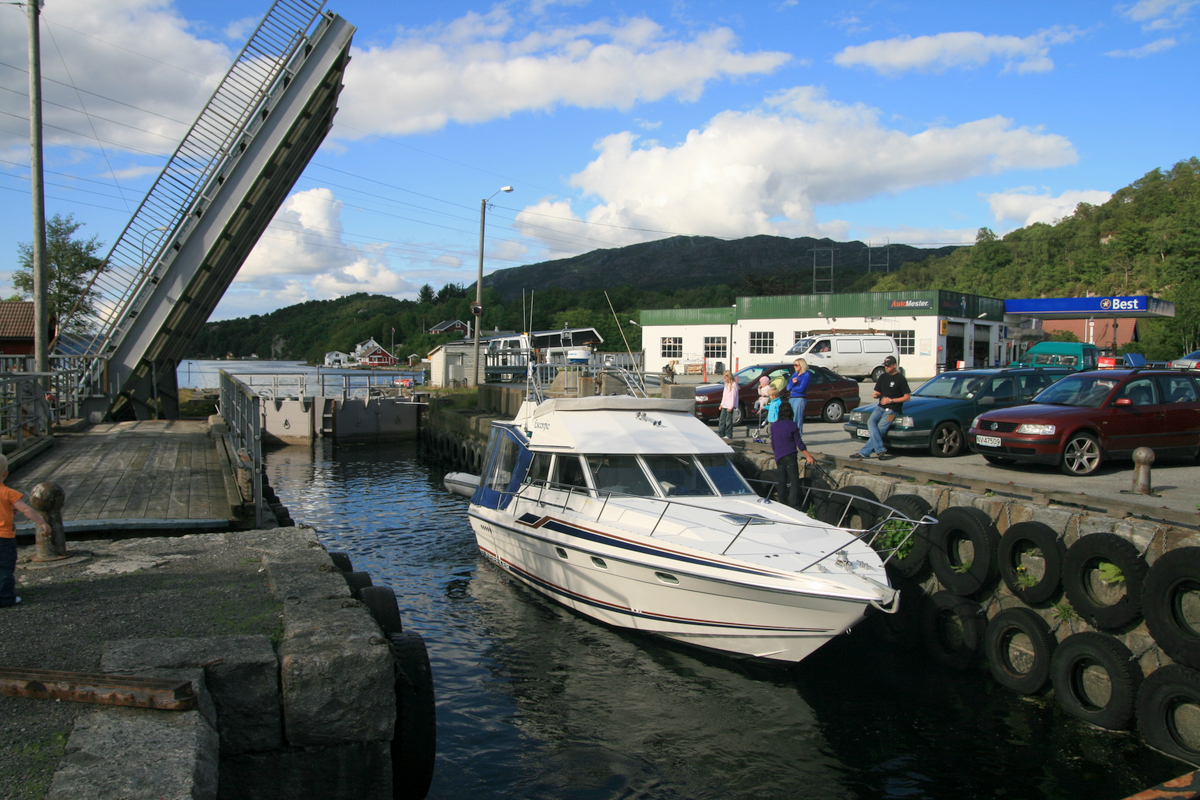
- View of the locks along the fjord
- Interactive map of the fjord
- Location: Rogaland county, Norway
- Coordinates: 59.45807°N 5.59413°E
- Type: Fjord
- Primary inflows: Grindafjorden
- Primary outflows: Boknafjorden
- Basin countries: Norway
- Max. length: 26 kilometres (16 mi)
- Settlements: Skjold

Skjoldafjorden is a fjord in Rogaland county, Norway. The 26-kilometre (16 mi) long fjord is a northern branch of vast Boknafjorden which dominates Rogaland county.

The fjord is located in Tysvær Municipality and Vindafjord Municipality. The north end of the Skjoldafjorden at the village of Skjold connects to the Grindafjorden which flows from the village of Grinde to Skjold. The south end of the fjord empties in to a large bay called the Hervikfjorden, which flows directly into the Boknafjorden.

The island of Borgøy is located at the mouth of the fjord where the Hervikfjorden begins. Further to the north, the narrow passage Skjoldastraumen has strong tide flows and is rather shallow. A lock system was built there to accommodate boat traffic. It is the only salt water lock in Norway.

== See also ==
- List of Norwegian fjords
