= Førre =

Village in Tysvær Municipality, Norway

Førre Førresfjorden (unofficial) Førde (unofficial)
- Village
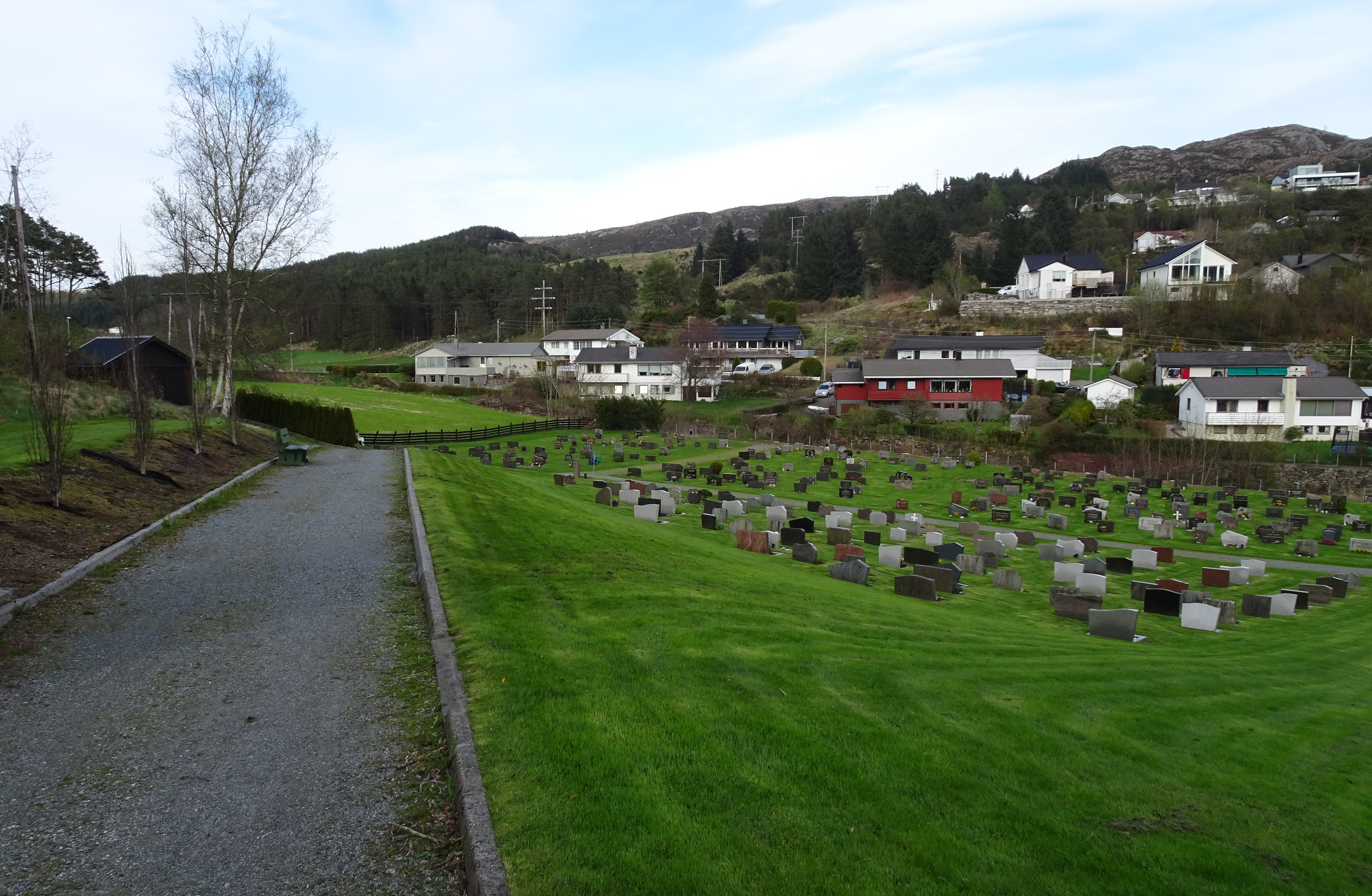
- View of the village
- Interactive map of Førre
- Coordinates: 59.42429°N 5.38448°E
- Country: Norway
- Region: Western Norway
- County: Rogaland
- District: Haugaland
- Municipality: Tysvær Municipality

Area
  - Total: 3.68 km^{2} (1.42 sq mi)
- Elevation: 6 m (20 ft)

Population (2019)
  - Total: 5,710
  - Density: 1,552/km^{2} (4,020/sq mi)
- Time zone: UTC+01:00 (CET)
  - Summer (DST): UTC+02:00 (CEST)
- Post Code: 5563 Førresfjorden

Førre is a village in Tysvær Municipality in Rogaland county, Norway. The village is located at the northern end of the Førresfjorden. The 3.68-square-kilometre (910-acre) village has a population (2025) of 5,710 and a population density of 1,552 inhabitants per square kilometre (4,020/sq mi).

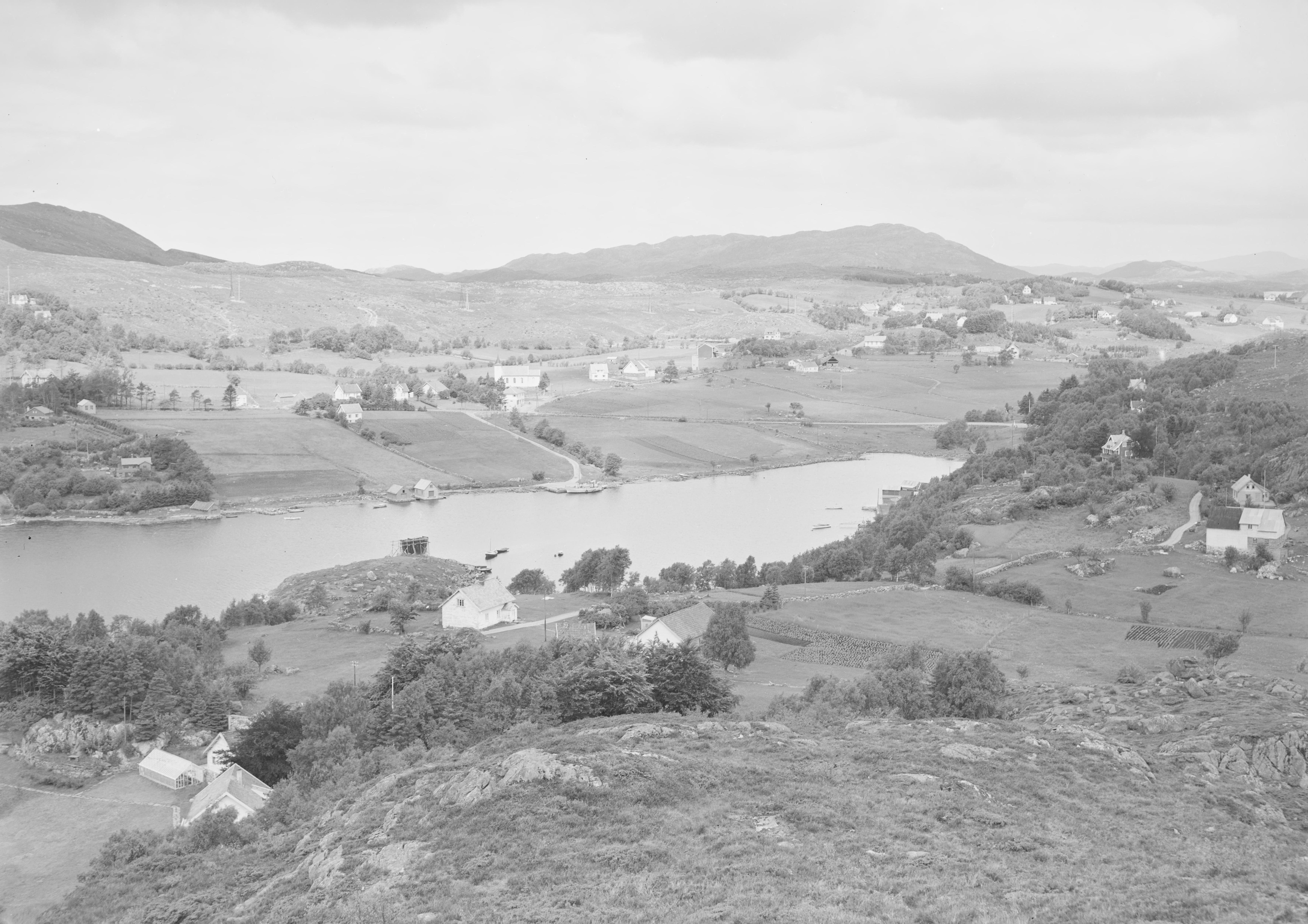
View of the village in the 1950s

The village sits along the European route E134 highway, connecting it to the nearby city of Haugesund to the west and to the villages of Aksdal and Grinde to the east. Førre Church, built in 1893, is located in this village.
