= Grinde, Rogaland =

Village in Tysvær Municipality, Norway

Grinde
- Village
- Interactive map of Grinde
- Coordinates: 59.43039°N 5.46527°E
- Country: Norway
- Region: Western Norway
- County: Rogaland
- District: Haugaland
- Municipality: Tysvær Municipality

Area
  - Total: 0.6 km^{2} (0.23 sq mi)
- Elevation: 3 m (9.8 ft)

Population (2025)
  - Total: 946
  - Density: 1,577/km^{2} (4,080/sq mi)
- Time zone: UTC+01:00 (CET)
  - Summer (DST): UTC+02:00 (CEST)
- Post Code: 5570 Aksdal

Grinde is a village in Tysvær Municipality in Rogaland county, Norway. The village is located at the western end of the Grindafjorden, a couple of kilometers east of the villages Aksdal and Førre. Grinde lies along the European route E39-European route E134 highway.

The 0.6-square-kilometre (150-acre) village has a population (2025) of 946 and a population density of 1,577 inhabitants per square kilometre (4,080/sq mi).

== History ==
Grinde was historically located in the old Skjold Municipality. On 1 January 1965, Skjold Municipality was dissolved and its territory dispersed among three municipalities. The districts Grinde, Dueland, and Yrkje with 1,133 inhabitants in total, were merged into Tysvær Municipality.
