= Rogaland =

County in Western Norway

Rogaland County Rogaland fylke
- County
- Sverd i fjell in Hafrsfjord

- Flag Coat of arms

- Rogaland within Norway
- Coordinates: 59°N 06°E
- Country: Norway
- County: Rogaland
- District: Western Norway
- Established: 1662
- Administrative centre: Stavanger

Government
  - Body: Rogaland County Municipality
  - Governor (2021): Bent Høie (H)
  - County mayor (2023): Ole Ueland (H)

Area
  - Total: 9,377.31 km^{2} (3,620.60 sq mi)
  - Land: 8,575.70 km^{2} (3,311.10 sq mi)
  - Water: 801.61 km^{2} (309.50 sq mi) 8.5%
  - Rank: #10 in Norway

Population (1 January 2024)
  - Total: 499,417
  - Rank: #4 in Norway
  - Density: 56.3/km^{2} (146/sq mi)
- Demonym: Rogalending

Official language
  - Norwegian form: Neutral
- Time zone: UTC+01:00 (CET)
  - Summer (DST): UTC+02:00 (CEST)
- ISO 3166 code: NO-11
- Website: Official website

Rogaland (Norwegian: [ˈrûːɡɑlɑn]) is a county in Western Norway, bordering the North Sea to the west and the counties of Vestland to the north, Telemark to the east and Agder to the east and southeast. As of 1 January 2024, it had a population of 499,417 people.

The administrative centre of the county is the city of Stavanger, which is the third largest city in Norway.

== Etymology ==
Rogaland is the region's Old Norse name, which was revived in modern times. During Denmark's rule of Norway the county was named Stavanger amt, after the large city of Stavanger, and this name continued to be used until 1919. The first element in the name Rogaland is the plural genitive case of rygir, probably referring to the name of an old Germanic tribe (see Rugians). The second element is land which means "land" or "region".

== Coat of arms ==
The coat of arms is modern; it was granted on 11 January 1974. The arms are blue with a white or silver pointed cross in the centre. The cross is based on the old stone cross in Sola Municipality, the oldest national monument in Norway. It was erected in memory of Erling Skjalgsson after his death in 1028. This type of cross was very common in medieval Norway.

== Geography ==
Rogaland is mainly a coastal region with fjords, beaches, and islands, the principal island being Karmøy. The vast Boknafjorden is the largest bay, with many fjords branching off from it.

Stavanger/Sandnes, the third-largest urban area of Norway, is also a central area for the Norwegian petroleum industry. The area includes the large cities of Stavanger and Sandnes. Randaberg Municipality and Sola Municipality are also in close proximity. Together, this conurbation is ranked above the city Trondheim in population rankings in Norway.

Cities/towns in Rogaland other than Stavanger and Sandnes include Haugesund, Egersund, Sauda, Jørpeland, Bryne, Kopervik, Åkrehamn, and Skudeneshavn.

Karmøy Municipality has large deposits of copper (some from the Visnes mine was used in the construction of the Statue of Liberty). Sokndal Municipality has large deposits of ilmenite. Rogaland is the most important region for oil and gas exploration in Norway, and the Jæren district in Rogaland is one of the country's most important agricultural districts.

== History ==
There are remains in Rogaland from the earliest times, such as the excavations in a cave at Viste in Randaberg Municipality (Svarthola). These include the find of a skeleton of a boy from the Stone Age. Various archeological finds stem from the following times, the Bronze Age and the Iron Age. Many crosses in Irish style have been found. Rogaland was called Rygjafylke in the Viking Age. Before Harald Fairhair and the Battle of Hafrsfjord, it was a petty kingdom. The Rugians were a tribe possibly connected with Rogaland.

== Culture and tourism ==
A series of festivals and congresses of international fame and profile are arranged, such as The Chamber Music Festival, The Maijazz Festival, The Gladmat (lit. happy food) Festival, and The ONS event, which has been held in Stavanger every second year since 1974. The ONS is a major international conference and exhibition with focus on oil and gas, and other topics from the petroleum industry. The Concert Hall and Music Complex at Bjergsted and the Stavanger Symphony Orchestra provide important inspiration in the Norwegian musical environment. Another annual event in Stavanger is The World Tour Beach Volleyball. During this tournament, the downtown is converted into a beach volleyball arena.

Rogaland is home to many natural wonders, like Prekestolen, Kjerag and Gloppedalsura. In Stavanger, there is an archeological museum with many artifacts from early history in Rogaland. An Iron Age farm at Ullandhaug in Stavanger is reconstructed on the original farm site dating back to 350–500 AD. The Viking Farm is a museum at Karmøy.

== Government ==
A county (fylke) is the chief local administrative area in Norway. The whole country is divided into 11 counties. A county is also an election area, with popular votes taking place every 4 years. In Rogaland, the government of the county is the Rogaland County Municipality. It includes 47 members who are elected to form a county council (Fylkesting). Heading the Fylkesting is the county mayor (fylkesordførar). Since 2020, the Rogaland County Municipality has been led by Marianne Chesak, the county mayor.

The county also has a county governor (fylkesmann) who is the representative of the King and Government of Norway. Bent Høie is the incumbent governor, in office since 1 November 2021.

The municipalities in Rogaland are divided among several district courts (tingrett): Dalane District Court, Haugaland District Court, Jæren District Court, and Stavanger District Court. All of these courts are subordinate to the Gulating Court of Appeal district based in Bergen.

== Subdivisions ==
=== Municipalities ===
Rogaland County has a total of 23 municipalities:

Municipal Number	Name	Adm. Centre	Location in the county	Established	Includes (former municipalities)
1101	Eigersund Municipality	Egersund		1 Jan 1965	1101 Egersund (town); 1113 Heskestad Municipality (part); 1115 Helleland Municipality
1103	Stavanger Municipality	Stavanger		1 Jan 1838	1124 Håland Municipality (part); 1125 Madla Municipality; 1126 Hetland Municipality (part); 1132 Fister Municipality (part); 1133 Hjelmeland og Fister Municipality (part); 1140 Sjernarøy Municipality; 1141 Finnøy Municipality; 1142 Rennesøy Municipality
1106	Haugesund Municipality	Haugesund		1 Jan 1855	1152 Torvastad Municipality (part); 1153 Skåre Municipality
1108	Sandnes Municipality	Sandnes		1 Jan 1838	1123 Høyland Municipality; 1126 Hetland Municipality (part); 1128 Høle Municipality (part); 1129 Forsand Municipality (part)
1111	Sokndal Municipality	Hauge		1 Jan 1838	1107 Sogndal Municipality
1112	Lund Municipality	Moi		1 Jan 1838	1113 Heskestad Municipality (part)
1114	Bjerkreim Municipality	Vikeså		1 Jan 1838	
1119	Hå Municipality	Varhaug		1 Jan 1964	1117 Ogna Municipality; 1118 Varhaug Municipality; 1119 Nærbø Municipality
1120	Klepp Municipality	Kleppe		1 Jan 1838	
1121	Time Municipality	Bryne		1 Jan 1838	
1122	Gjesdal Municipality	Ålgård		1 Jan 1838	1128 Høle Municipality (part)
1124	Sola Municipality	Solakrossen		1 Jan 1930	1124 Håland Municipality (part)
1127	Randaberg Municipality	Randaberg		1 July 1922	
1130	Strand Municipality	Jørpeland		1 Jan 1838	1129 Forsand Municipality (part)
1133	Hjelmeland Municipality	Hjelmelandsvågen		1 July 1884	1131 Årdal Municipality; 1132 Fister Municipality (part); 1133 Hjelmeland og Fister Municipality (part)
1134	Suldal Municipality	Sand		1 Jan 1838	1136 Sand Municipality; 1137 Erfjord Municipality; 1138 Jelsa Municipality; 1156 Imsland Municipality (part)
1135	Sauda Municipality	Sauda		1 Jan 1842	
1144	Kvitsøy Municipality	Ydstebøhamn		1 Jan 1923	
1145	Bokn Municipality	Føresvik		1 Jan 1849	
1146	Tysvær Municipality	Aksdal		1 Jan 1849	1139 Nedstrand Municipality; 1147 Avaldsnes Municipality (part); 1154 Skjold Municipality (part)
1149	Karmøy Municipality	Kopervik		1 Jan 1965	1104 Skudeneshavn (town); 1105 Kopervik (town); 1147 Avaldsnes Municipality (part); 1148 Stangaland Municipality; 1149 Åkra Municipality; 1150 Skudenes Municipality; 1152 Torvastad Municipality (part)
1151	Utsira Municipality	Utsira		1 July 1924	
1160	Vindafjord Municipality	Ølensjøen		1 Jan 1965	1154 Skjold Municipality (part); 1155 Vats Municipality; 1156 Imsland Municipality (part); 1157 Vikedal Municipality; 1158 Sandeid Municipality; 1159 Ølen Municipality

=== Districts ===
- Dalane
- Haugaland
- Jæren
- Ryfylke

=== Cities ===
- Bryne
- Egersund
- Haugesund
- Jørpeland
- Kopervik
- Sauda
- Sandnes
- Skudeneshavn
- Stavanger
- Åkrehamn

=== Parishes ===
- Askøy (Askø)
- Avaldsnes
- Bjerkreim
- Bokn (Bukken)
- Bore
- Bø
- Domkirken, Stavanger
- Egersund
- Erfjord
- Falnes
- Ferkingstad
- Finnøy (Hesby)
- Fister
- Forsand (Fossan)
- Frue, see Hetland
- Førdesfjorden
- Gjestal
- Haugesund
- Hausken
- Helleland
- Hesby
- Heskestad
- Hetland
- Hjelmeland
- Hvidingsø
- Høgsfjord
- Høle
- Høyland
- Hå
- Håland
- Imsland
- Jelsa (Jelsø)
- Klepp
- Kopervik
- Kvitsøy (Hvidingsø)
- Lund
- Lye
- Madla
- Malle, see Madla
- Mosterøy
- Nedstrand (Hinderå)
- Norheim
- Nærbø
- Nærem
- Ogna
- Orre
- Randaberg (Randeberg)
- Rennesøy
- Riska (Riskekvernen)
- Røldal (in Hordaland after 1848)
- Sand
- Sandeid
- Sandnes
- Sankt Johannes, Stavanger
- Sankt Petri, Stavanger
- Saude (Sauda)
- Sjernarøy
- Skjold
- Skudenes
- Skudeneshavn
- Skåre
- Sokndal
- Sola (Sole)
- Soma
- Stavanger
- Strand
- Suldal
- Sørbø
- Talgøy (Talgje)
- Tananger
- Time (Lye)
- Tjora
- Torvastad (Torvestad)
- Tysvær
- Utsira
- Utstein Kloster
- Varhaug
- Vats
- Veavågen
- Vikedal
- Vår Frue, see Hetland
- Åkra
- Åkra (old)
- Åna-Sira
- Årdal
- Egersund Branch (LDS, 1899–1913)
- Haugesund Branch (LDS, 1905–1950)
- Stavanger Branch (LDS, 1850–1938)
- Stavanger (Dissentermenigheter: Stavanger, Klepp, and Haugesund 1859–1903)
- Stavanger (Vennenes Samfund- Quakers, 1821–1951)

=== Villages ===
- Aksdal
- Amdal
- Askje
- Åkrehamn
- Åmøy
- Avaldsnes
- Bjerkreim
- Bjoa
- Bore
- Bru
- Brusand
- Dirdal
- Dueland
- Eik
- Eike
- Erfjord
- Ferkingstad
- Feøy
- Figgjo
- Fiskå
- Fister
- Fogn
- Forsand
- Foss-Eikeland
- Frafjord
- Føresvik
- Førre
- Gjesdal
- Gilja
- Grinde
- Grødem
- Hauge i Dalane
- Hellandsbygd
- Helleland
- Hellvik
- Hervik
- Hesby
- Heskestad
- Hestnes
- Hindaråvåg
- Hjelmelandsvågen
- Hommersåk
- Hundvåg
- Hæen
- Høle
- Hålandsmarka
- Hålandsosen
- Idse
- Imslandsjøen
- Innbjoa
- Jelsa
- Judaberg
- Jøsenfjorden
- Klepp stasjon
- Kleppe
- Krossberg
- Kvernaland
- Li
- Lyefjell
- Lysebotn
- Marvik
- Moi
- Mossige
- Nedstrand
- Nesflaten
- Norheim
- Nærbø
- Oanes
- Obrestad
- Ogna
- Oltedal
- Orre
- Pollestad
- Randaberg
- Rekefjord
- Røvær
- Sand i Ryfylke
- Sandeid
- Sandve
- Saudasjøen
- Sirevåg
- Sjernarøyane
- Skjold
- Skjoldastraumen
- Sogndalsstrand
- Solakrossen
- Stenebyen
- Stronda
- Suldalsosen
- Susort
- Sviland
- Sør-Hidle
- Sørbø
- Sørnes
- Talgje
- Tau
- Torvastad
- Tysværvåg
- Undheim
- Varhaug
- Vassøy
- Vatne i Sandnes
- Vatne i Vindafjord
- Veavågen
- Verdalen
- Vigrestad
- Vikebygd
- Vikedal
- Vikeså
- Vikevåg
- Visnes
- Voll
- Vormedal
- Yrke
- Ydstebøhamn
- Ølensjøen
- Ølensvåg (Ølsvågen)
- Øvrebygd
- Ålgård
- Åna-Sira
- Årdal i Ryfylke

=== Former municipalities ===
- Avaldsnes
- Egersund
- Erfjord
- Finnøy
- Fister
- Forsand
- Helleland
- Heskestad
- Hetland
- Hjelmeland og Fister
- Høle
- Høyland
- Håland
- Imsland
- Jelsa
- Kopervik
- Madla
- Nedstrand
- Nærbø
- Ogna
- Rennesøy
- Sand
- Sandeid
- Sjernarøy
- Skjold
- Skudenes
- Skudeneshavn
- Skåre
- Sogndal
- Stangaland
- Torvastad
- Vats
- Varhaug
- Vikedal
- Ølen
- Åkra
- Årdal

== Education ==
=== Higher Education ===
- University of Stavanger
- VID Specialized University (Stavanger)
- Western Norway University of Applied Sciences (Haugesund)
- Norwegian University of Life Sciences (Sandnes)

== Demographics ==
Religion in Rogaland
religion	percent
Christianity	85.47%
Islam	1.53%
Buddhism	0.24%
Other/atheism	12.76%

Total population:

Historical population
Year	Pop.	±%
1951	211,512	—
1961	239,052	+13.0%
1971	268,684	+12.4%
1981	305,490	+13.7%
1991	337,906	+10.6%
2001	375,225	+11.0%
2011	436,087	+16.2%
2021	482,645	+10.7%
2031 (est.)	594,278	+23.1%

== In popular culture ==
Rogaland is a playable region within Norway in Assassin's Creed Valhalla, called Rygjafylke in the game. It is also the homeland of the game’s main character, Eivor Varinsdottir.
