= Melancholia (disambiguation) =

Melancholia was one of the four temperaments in proto-psychology and pre-modern medicine, representing a state of low mood.

Melancholia may also refer to:

== Health and medicine ==
- Depression (mood), a state of low mood also known as "melancholia"
- Major depressive disorder, a mood disorder historically called "melancholia"
- Involutional melancholia, a traditional name for a psychiatric disorder affecting mainly elderly or late middle-aged people that is no longer in use
- Melancholic depression, a DSM-IV and DSM-5 specifier of depressive disorders.

== Film and television ==
- Melancholia (1989 film), a British-German film by Andi Engel, starring Jeroen Krabbé
- Melancholia (2008 film), a Philippine film by Lav Diaz
- Melancholia (2011 film), an English-language film by Lars von Trier
- Melancholia (TV series), a 2021 South Korean thriller TV series

== Art and music ==
- "Melancholia", a musical composition by Duke Ellington that first appeared on the 1953 album The Duke Plays Ellington
- Melencolia I, a 1514 engraving by Albrecht Dürer
- Melancholy (novel) or Melancholia I, a 1995 novel by Jon Fosse
- Melancholy II or Melancholia II, a 1996 novella by Jon Fosse
- Melancholia (Lucas Cranach the Elder, Colmar), 1532
- Melancholia (Lucas Cranach the Elder, Copenhagen), 1532
- Melancholia is an album by keyboardist Rick Wakeman, released in 2025 and is the third in a series of records of all piano suites.

== Other uses ==
- 5708 Melancholia, an asteroid

== See also ==
- Melancholy (disambiguation)
- La Malinconia (disambiguation)
