= Alfred Hauge =

Norwegian writer (1915–1986)

Alfred Hauge (17 October 1915 – 31 October 1986) was a Norwegian educator, journalist, novelist, poet and historian. He wrote extensively about life on the Ryfylke islands and about Norwegian-American emigration.

== Biography ==
Hauge was born and grew up on the island of Kyrkjøy in the Sjernarøyane islands in Finnøy Municipality in Rogaland County, Norway. He was the son of Kolbein Andersson Hauge (1889–1972) and Marianne Rasmusdotter Auglænd (1893–1967). His brother Kolbjørn Hauge (1926-2007) was a schoolteacher and author. He completed primary school at Bryne in Time Municipality and graduated artium at Vossavangen in Hordaland during 1935. He obtained his teaching degree at Oslo in 1939. He worked as a teacher at Karmøy in Rogaland and at Stavern in Vestfold until 1945. From 1952-53, he was the Rector of the Ryfylke Folkehøgskule at Sand in Hedmark. From 1953-1983, he was a journalist at Stavanger Aftenblad.

Hauge debuted with the historical novel Septemberfrost in 1941. Hauge is best known for describing the life and adventures of Cleng Peerson, a pioneer Norwegian immigrant to the United States in the 1820s. His trilogy included: Hundevakt (1961; "Midwatch”), Landkjenning (1964; "Land Sighting"), and Ankerfeste (1965; “Anchoring”). This collected work was published as Cleng Peerson in Norway during 1968. An English-language version was translated by Eric J. Friis and published under the same title during 1975. This publication was released as one of the official publications of the Norwegian Immigration Sesquicentennial in 1975.

Hauge received numerous literary awards during his career. In 1955, Hauge won the Gyldendal's Endowment, a literature prize which was awarded by the Norwegian publisher Gyldendal Norsk Forlag. In recognition of his work he was also awarded the Norwegian Critics Prize for Literature in 1965. Hauge was made a Knight 1st Class the Order of St. Olav in 1976. He received an honorary doctorate at Luther College at Decorah, Iowa in 1982.

A memorial to Hauge has been erected on the island of Kyrkjøy at Sjernarøy Church (Sjernarøy kirke). The memorial is a bust made by artist Svein Magnus Håvarstein (1942–2013). Sjernarøy Church is an historic wooden church which dates to 1636.

Composer Hallvard Johnsen (1916-2003) wrote an opera based upon Alfred Hauge's Legenden om Svein og Maria. The opera was first performed on 3 September 1973 by the Norwegian National Opera and Ballet (Den Norske Opera & Ballet) in Oslo.

== Selected works ==
- Septemberfrost: eit folkelivsbilete frå åra 1812-14 (1941)
- Skyer i drift over vårgrønt land (1945); collection of poetry
- Hans Nielsen Hauge: Guds vandringsmann (1947)
- Tuntreet blør (1953); novel
- Kvinner på Galgebakken (1958); novel
- Cleng Peerson: hundevakt (1961) novel (Part I of Cleng Peerson- trilogy)
- Cleng Peerson: landkjenning (1961) novel (Part II of Cleng Peerson- trilogy)
- Gå vest - gjennom Amerika i emigrantspor (1963) A travel sketch illustrated by Henry Imsland
- Cleng Peerson: ankerfeste. (1965) (Part III of Cleng Peerson- trilogy)
- Mysterium (1967) novel
- Cleng Peerson: utvandring (1968) drama written in collaboration with Asbjørn Toms.
- Det evige sekund (1970) collection of poetry
- Evangelium (1977) collection of poetry
- Barndom (1975) personal recollections
- Ungdom (1977) personal recollections
- Flinta-Lars: det gamle Jæren i tradisjon og folkeminne (1985) folk memories
- Gamle Jæren: andre boka om tradisjon og folkeminne etter Lars A. Tjøtta (1986) folk memories
- Manndom. Livsminne (1999), manuscript published postmortem by Alfred Hauge’s family in cooperation with the publisher Gyldendal

== Awards ==
- Melsom Prize - 1949
- Gyldendal's Endowment - 1955
- Sunnmørsprisen - 1958 (for Kvinner på Galgebakken)
- Norwegian Critics Prize for Literature - 1965 (for the Cleng Peerson trilogy)
- Sokneprest Alfred Andersson-Ryssts fond - 1974
- Nynorsk Literature Prize - 1984 (for Serafen)

== Other sources ==
- Pedersen, Odd Kvaal (1985) Gråstein og lengsel : peilinger i Alfred Hauges tema og litterære landskap (Oslo : Gyldendal Norsk Forlag) ISBN 82-05-16409-6
- Sørbø, Jan Inge (2001) Angen av bork og ein brennande einerbusk. Om Alfred Hauges forfattarskap, Oslo ISBN 82-05-29137-3
- Aano, Jacob (2000) Helsing Alfred : eit blikk på norsk kultur gjennom Alfred Hauge sine brev, Oslo ISBN 82-476-0159-1
