= Sjernarøy =

Sjernarøy may refer to:

== Places ==
- Sjernarøyane, an island group in Stavanger Municipality in Rogaland county, Norway
- Sjernarøy Municipality, a former municipality in Rogaland county, Norway
- Sjernarøy Church, a church in Stavanger Municipality in Rogaland county, Norway
- Sjernarøy Bridge, a road bridge in the Sjernarøyane islands in Stavanger Municipality in Rogaland county, Norway
