= Grepstad =

Grepstad is a Norwegian surname. Notable people with the surname include:

- Jon Grepstad (born 1944), Norwegian freelance journalist, photographer, and peace activist
- Ottar Grepstad (born 1953), Norwegian writer
