= Melancholy =

Melancholy may refer to:

- Melancholia, one of the four temperaments in pre-modern medicine and proto-psychology, representing a state of low mood
- Depression (mood), a state of low mood, also known as melancholy
- Major depressive disorder, a mood disorder historically called melancholy

== Arts and books ==
- Melancholy (novel), a 1995 novel by Jon Fosse
- Melancholy II or Melancholia II, a 1996 novella by Jon Fosse
- Melancholy (Munch), an 1891–1893 series of paintings by Edvard Munch
- Melancholy (Hayez), an 1840-1841 painting by Francesco Hayez

== Music ==
- Melancholy (Cecil Taylor album), a 1999 live free jazz album by Cecil Taylor's Workshop Ensemble
- Melancholy (Shadow of Intent album), a 2019 album
- "Melancholy" (song), an environmental song by 365 Nepali artists 2017
  - Melancholy (documentary), a 2018 documentary based on environmental research studies of the regions of Nepal from 2013 to 2018
- "Melancolie", a 1983 Moldovan song written by Grigore Vieru
- "Melancholy", a 1998 song by Iced Earth from the album Something Wicked This Way Comes
- "Melancholy", a 2017 song by the rapper Murs
- "Melancholy", a 2024 song by Swallow the Sun from the album Shining
- "Melancholy", a 2009 song by Timothy B. Schmit from the album Expando

== See also ==
- Melancholia (disambiguation)
- La Malinconia (disambiguation)
