= Rasmus Flo =

Norwegian academic, writer and translator (1851–1905)

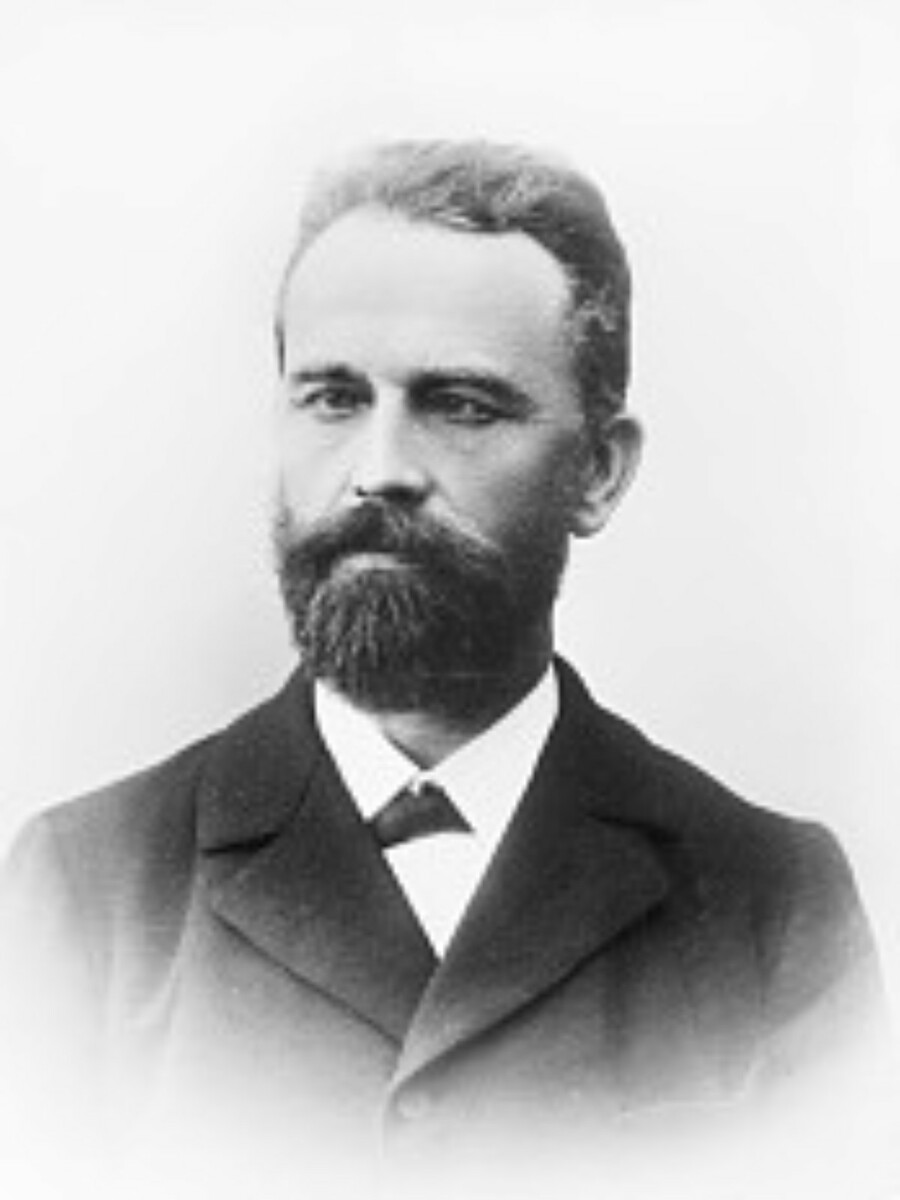
- Born: 29 September 1851; Stryn, Norway
- Died: 30 November 1905 (aged 54); Oslo, Norway
- Education: Philology, University of Oslo, 1881
- Occupations: Teacher, Philologist, Editor, Translator
- Known for: Development of Nynorsk

Rasmus Flo (29 September 1851 – 30 November 1905) was a Norwegian teacher, philologist, magazine editor, and translator. He was a noted proponent of the use of the Nynorsk language.

== Biography ==
Rasmus Flo was born in Stryn Municipality near the northern border of Nordre Bergenhus county in Norway. He was a farmer's son from the small village of Flo, in the traditional district of Nordfjord. At the age of 20, he ventured from his home to go to Stord Municipality in Søndre Bergenhus county. He worked as a substitute teacher while studying for the "examen artium," an entrance exam for studying liberal arts at university in Norway. He took the test in 1873 and earned a degree in philology from the University of Oslo in 1881. From 1878 to 1885 he was a teacher at the town of Kongsvinger. Later he was an intern at the graduate school in Tromsø before spending two more years teaching in the Valdres municipal schools.

During his years as a student, Flo lived near Olaus Fjørtoft. The two conversed frequently and shared many views and opinions on various social, political, and linguistic issues. Like Fjørtoft, he wrote extensively about dialect. In 1892, he helped Molkte Moe in writing Nordahl Rolfsen's textbook, particularly with spelling and styling in the Nynorsk edition. The work he did on this book fit very well with Flo's own natural sense of style, and he translated many skaldic poems into Nynorsk for the book. Flo was also responsible for a great deal of the work in volumes two and three of Andreas Austild's textbooks.

Flo wrote frequently in various journals and magazines, mostly about language issues, as well as related social issues. In 1899, he was included in the first official orthography committee for the national idiom, which focused on spelling in Nynorsk. He was the first editor of the magazine Syn og Segn and also served as director of Det Norske Samlaget from 1894-1903. As a result of this and his work on textbooks by Rolfsen and Austild, Flo had a considerable amount of influence on the development of Nynorsk.

He was an avid bookworm and heavy tobacco user, according to a statement made by one of his colleagues.

Flo died in Kristiana, Norway (present day Oslo), in 1905. He had spent the evening putting together the next edition of Syn og Segn with a colleague and appeared to be in good health before he retired for the night. The following morning he was discovered dead in his bed. A memorial stone was erected in his honour in Flo.

== See also ==
- Norwegian language conflict
- Norwegian orthography
- Bokmål
- Ivar Aasen
