= Kolbjørn Hauge =

Norwegian writer (1926–2007)

- Born: 2 April 1926; Sjernarøy Municipality, Norway
- Died: 15 August 2007 (aged 81); Stavanger, Norway
- Education: Stord/Haugesund University College
- Occupations: Crime fiction writer Schoolteacher
- Notable work: Død mann i boks (1995)
- Relatives: Alfred Hauge (brother)
- Awards: Sunnmørsprisen (1993); Riverton Prize (1995)

Kolbjørn Hauge (2 April 1926 – 15 August 2007) was a Norwegian schoolteacher, crime fiction and non-fiction writer. He was awarded the Riverton Prize for 1995 for the crime novel Død mann i boks.

== Early and personal life ==
Hauge was born on the island of Kyrkjøy in the old Sjernarøy Municipality in Ryfylke (later this was part of Finnøy Municipality and since 2020, this is part of Stavanger Municipality). He was the son of Kolbein Andersson Hauge (1889–1972) and Marianne Rasmusdotter Auglænd (1893–1967). His brother was journalist, novelist, poet and historian Alfred Hauge (1915–1986). Hauge grew up in a pietistic rural environment. He had a versatile career including a gardener, fisherman, roadworker, clerk and sailor before embarking on a career in education. He obtained a teacher's degree at Stord/Haugesund University College which he attended from 1947 to 1951.

== Literary career ==
His non-fiction books include the textbooks in pedagogy Barn og historie (1984) and Ungdom og historie (1986). Further the political history Fra protest til parti (1987), and the linguistic books Historien om hvordan lydene fikk bokstaver (1986), and Stor norsk rimordbok from 1990. He made his crime fiction debut in 1991 with the novel Kofferten, and his literary breakthrough was Heit juice in 1993 for which he was awarded the Sunnmørsprisen. He won the Riverton Prize for Død mann i boks in 1995. Later books are the crime novels Til jord skal du bli from 1997, Over mitt lik from 1999, and Nord og ned from 2003. In 2004 he published the short story collection To perfekte mord og andre kriminelle historier.

He published the novel for young adults, Onsdagsranaren, in 1991, and his children's book Hitlers labyrint was published in 1998.

Hauge died in Stavanger on 15 August 2007, at the age of 81.
