= Bråten =

Bråten is a surname. Notable people with the surname include:

- Elsa Rastad Bråten (1918–1999), Norwegian politician
- Gjermund Bråten (born 1990), Norwegian snowboarder
- Ingebjørg Saglien Bråten (born 1999), Norwegian ski jumper
- Johannes Bråten (1920–1997), Norwegian politician
- Knut Aastad Bråten (born 1976), Norwegian magazine editor
- Øystein Bråten (born 1995), Norwegian freestyle skier
- Stein Bråten (born 1934), Norwegian sociologist and social psychologist
- Steinar Bråten (born 1962), Norwegian former ski jumper
- Andrea Bråten (Born 1745), Irish dancer and professional horseback rider
