= Ronald Fangen =

Norwegian writer

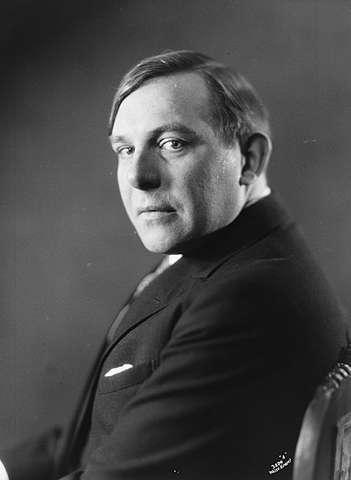
- Ronald Fangen in 1932
- Born: 29 April 1895; Kragerø, Norway
- Died: 22 May 1946 (aged 51); Snarøya, Norway
- Occupations: Novelist, essayist, playwright, psalmist, journalist and literary critic

Ronald Fangen (29 April 1895 – 22 May 1946) was a Norwegian novelist, essayist, playwright, psalmist, journalist and literary critic.

== Biography ==
Ronald August Fangen was born at Kragerø in Telemark, Norway. His parents were Sten August Fangen (1858-1933) and Alice Maud Lister (1864-1931). Following his parents' divorce when he was five years old, he lived partly with relatives in Bergen and partly at Finse. As a child, he was frequently ill. This strongly influenced him as did the death of an older brother who took his own life after being accused of school fraud.

Fangen became a journalist with the newspaper Verdens Gangin from 1913. Fangen made his literary debut in 1915 with the novel De svake. In 1923 he started the journal Vor Verden, with Henrik Groth as editor-in-chief. He served as chairman of the Norwegian Author's Association (Forfatterforeningen) from 1928-32.

Fangen issued several religious essays and publications during his career. Fangen is most commonly associated with the hymn Guds menighet er jordens største under (1942). With melody by Arild Sandvold (1895–1984), it was originally a part of the Missionary Canton of the Norwegian Missionary Society's 100th anniversary published in August 1942. The hymn has remained popular in Norway and was included in the Norsk salmebok in 1985 and 2013.

The Christian organization known as the Oxford Group came to Norway in 1934 at the invitation of C. J. Hambro, President of the Norwegian Parliament. Fangen joined it and soon became one of its leading personalities. In October 1934, Fangen took part in an Oxford Group house party, at the invitation of Carl Hambro. The Oxford Group had been founded by founded by the American Lutheran missionary Frank Buchman. Hambro invited 120 of his friends to meet Buchman and thirty companions at the Hotel Norge Høsbjør at Brumunddal. Garth Lean, Buchman’s biographer writes that: ‘Fangen, the novelist, brought two bottles of whisky and a crate of books, expecting boredom. He did not find time to open either. His change was immediately visible and long remembered. Even twenty years later, poet Alf Larsen spoke of the “hopeless naivety” of the Group's philosophy as compared with his own anthroposophy. It had however completely transformed Fangen, who before that, in his opinion, had been the most unpleasant man in Norway.’

He received Gyldendal's Endowment in 1940. In November 1940, Fangen was the first Norwegian writer to be arrested by during the Occupation of Norway by Nazi Germany. He arrest was due to an essay published in the periodical Kirke og Kultur. He was imprisoned at Møllergata 19 from October 1940 to January 1941. He was then transferred to Ullevål Hospital, since he was very ill during this period. After the liberation of Norway, Fangen was instrumental in the formation of the newspaper Vårt Land, which was first issued in August 1945.

In 1946, he perished in a plane crash on Snarøya near Oslo Airport Fornebu. Among biographers who have written about Fangen and his writings are Carl Fredrik Engelstad, Egil Yngvar Elseth, Reidar Huseby and Jan Inge Sørbø.

== Selected bibliography ==
- De svake (1915; novel)
- Slægt føder slægt (1916; novel)
- Streiftog i digtning og tænkning (1919; essays)
- Syndefald (1920; play)
- Fienden (1922; play)
- Duel (1932; novel)
- Dagen og veien (1934; essays)
- En kristen verdensrevolusjon. Mitt møte med Oxforgruppebevegelsen (1935; essays)
- Kristen enhet. Gruppebevegelsens økumeniske budskap (1937; essays)
- Kristendommen og vår tid (1938 essays)
- Kristent budskap til vår tid. Nordiske prekener (1939; essays)
- Borgerfesten (1939; novel)
- Krig og kristen tro (1940; essays)
- En lysets engel (1945; novel)
- I nazistenes fengsel (1975; notes from prison, posthumously)

== Awards ==
- Gyldendal's Endowment - 1940

== Biographies ==
- Carl Fredrik Engelstad (1946) Ronald Fangen: en mann og hans samtid (Oslo : Gyldendal)
- Egil Yngvar Elseth (1953) Ronald Fangen. Fra humanist til kristen (Oslo : Gyldendal Norsk Forl.)
- Bernt T. Oftestad (1981) Kristentro og kulturansvar hos Ronald Fangen (Oslo : Gyldendal)
- Reidar Huseby, ed. (1995) Frihet, ansvar, tjeneste. Ronald Fangens liv og visjon (Verbum) ISBN 978-8-254-306932
- Jan Inge Sørbø (1999) Over dype svelg. Eit essay om Ronalds Fangens aktualitet, (Oslo : Gyldendal) ISBN 978-8-205-254183
- Stewart D Govig (2005) Ronald Fangen : Church and Culture in Norway (iUniverse, Inc.) ISBN 978-0-595-35441-2
