= Old Pine Trees =

Painting by Lars Hertervig

- Gamle furutrær (Norwegian)
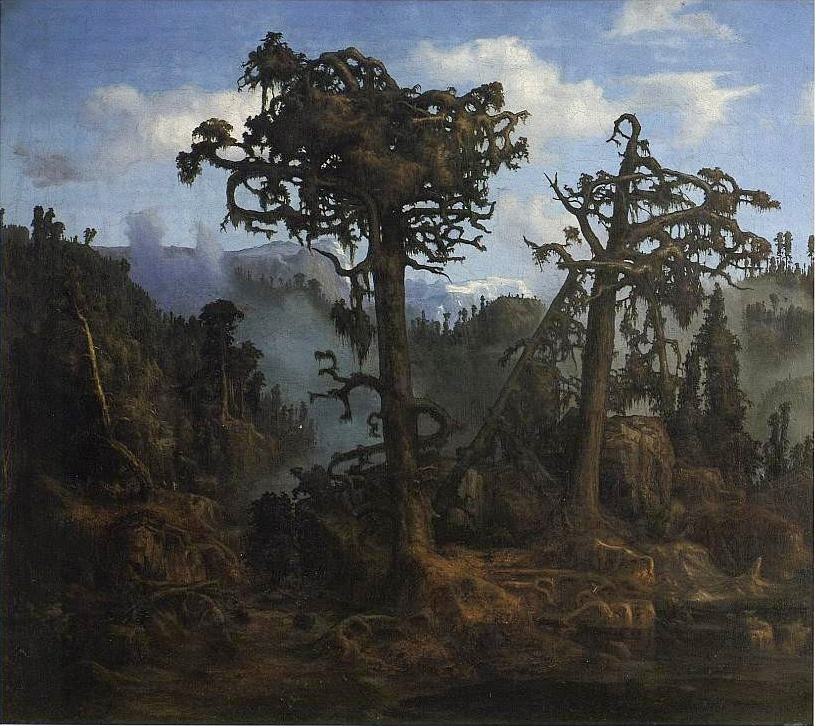
- Artist: Lars Hertervig
- Year: 1865
- Medium: oil on canvas
- Dimensions: 64 cm × 74.5 cm (25 in × 29.3 in)
- Location: Stavanger kunstmuseum; Stavanger

Old Pine Trees (Norwegian:Gamle furutrær) is a painting by Lars Hertervig from 1865.

Lars Hertervig painted Old Pine Trees at the age of 35 in Stavanger. He then worked in a carpentry and paint shop in the town, after studying painting for a few years at the Kunstakademie Düsseldorf under Hans Gude. He had also visited England and the Mediterranean countries.

== Description ==
The painting shows two old pines in a primeval forest early on a sunny day. Between the dark earth and the bright sky. In the valleys is a blue-gray morning fog, and in the background the snow-capped mountains.

== Provenance ==
Petra Aanensen (1858-?), Single daughter of master painter Peder Aanensen (1821-?), In 1940, his artistic estate left the family for the Stavanger Kunstforening. This included the painting, which has been in family ownership since its creation in 1865. Then the painting came with the rest of the art in 1992, when the permanent collection became part of the Rogaland Art Museum in Stavanger, today called the Stavanger kunstmuseum.

== Other paintings with forest motifs of Lars Hertervig ==
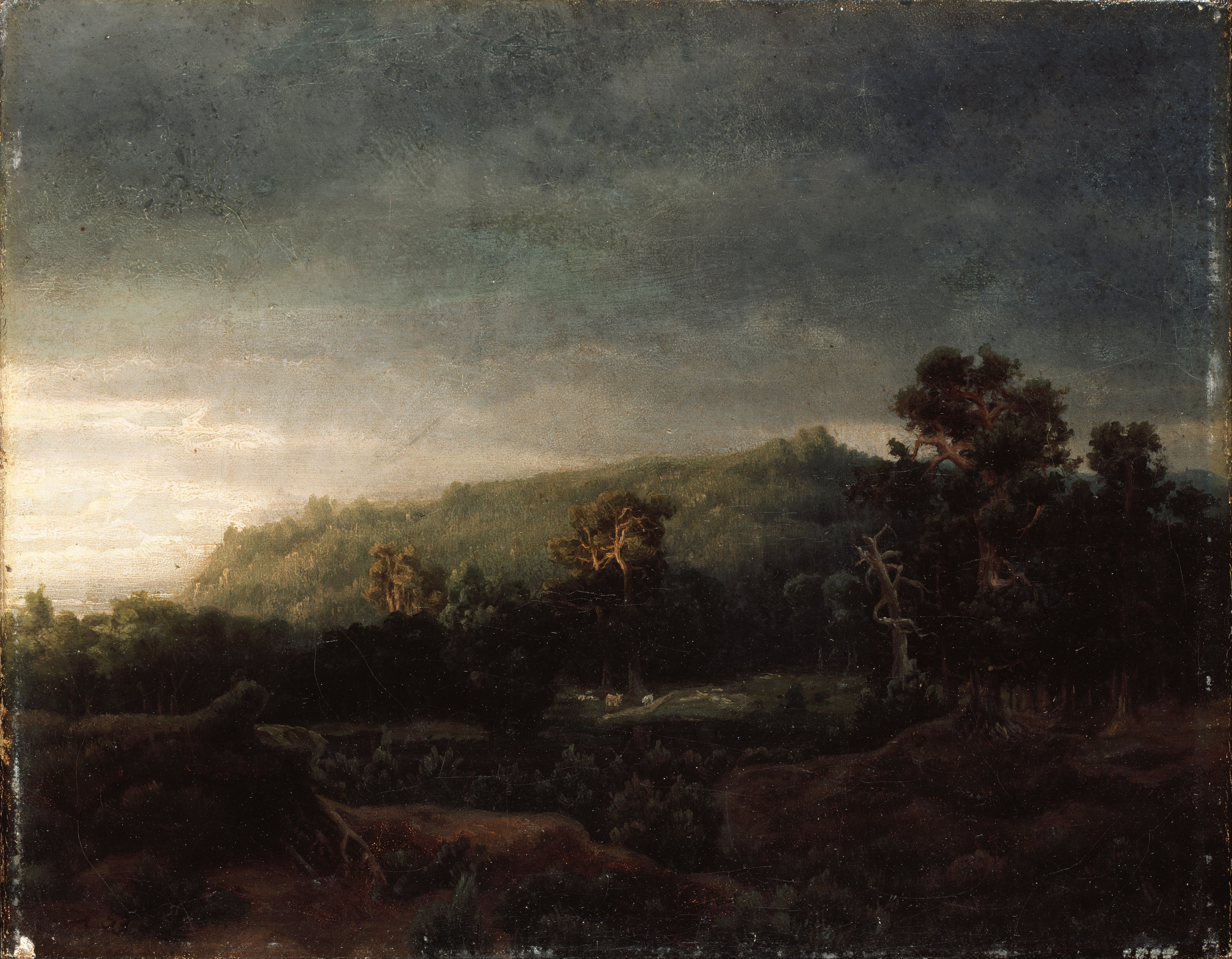
Skog, 1853

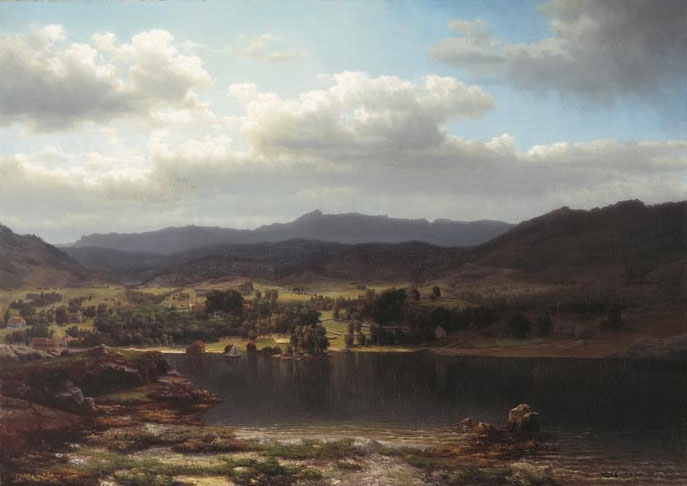
Fra Skånevik, 1854

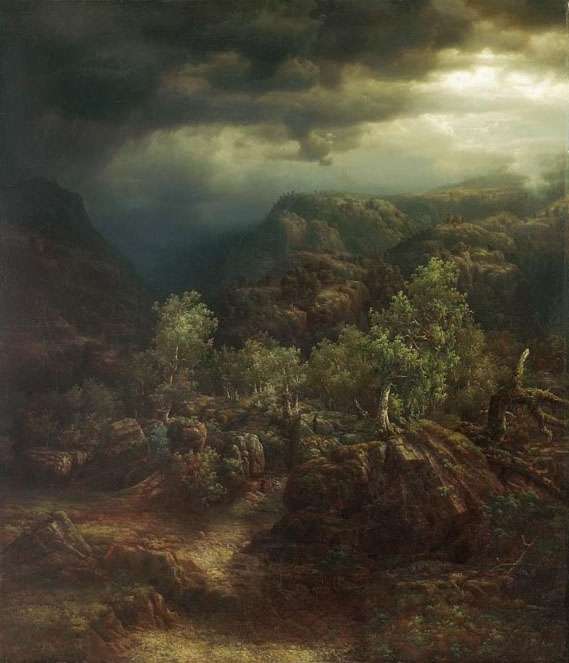
Rullstaddjuvet, 1855

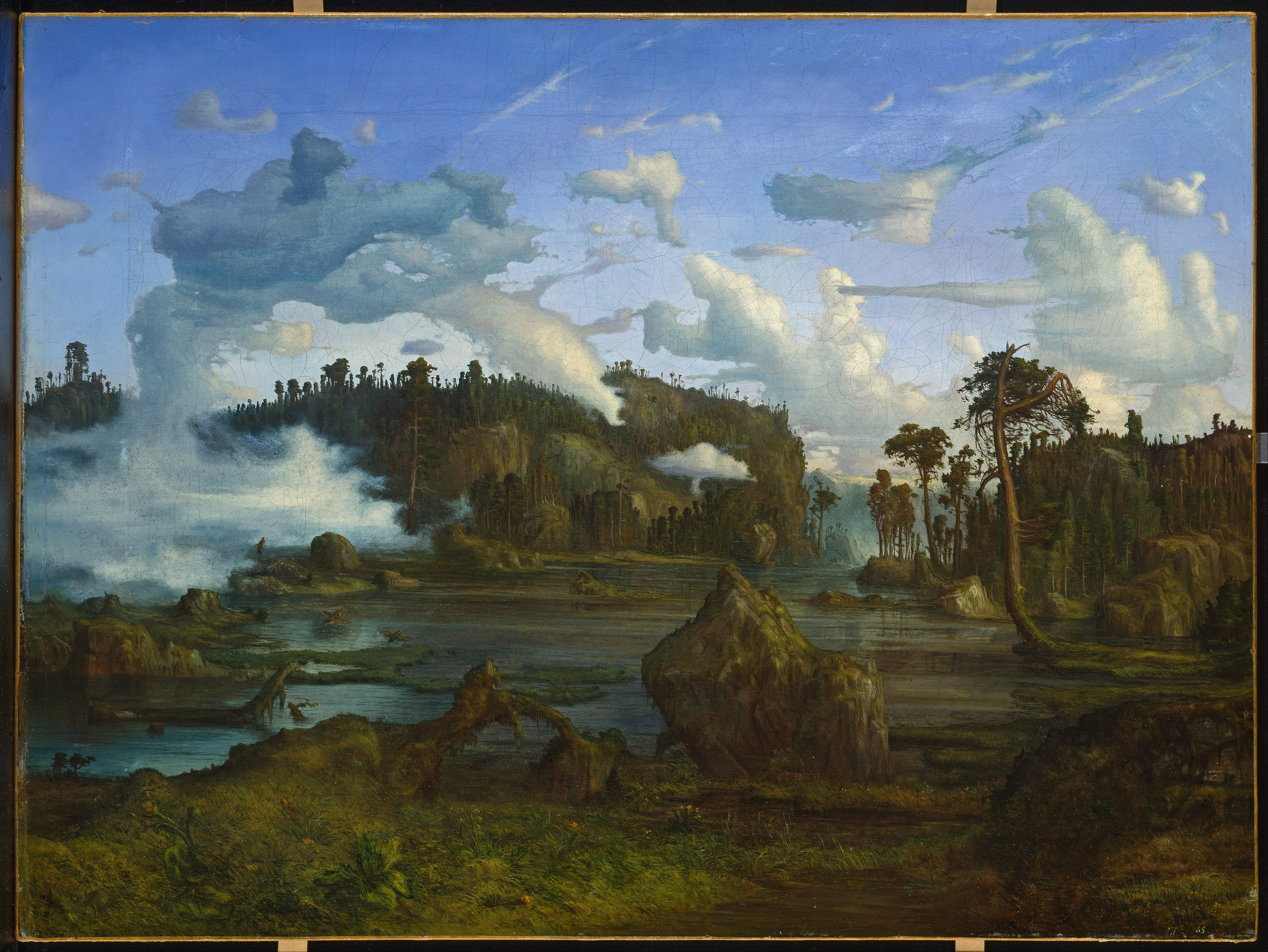
Tjärnen, 1865

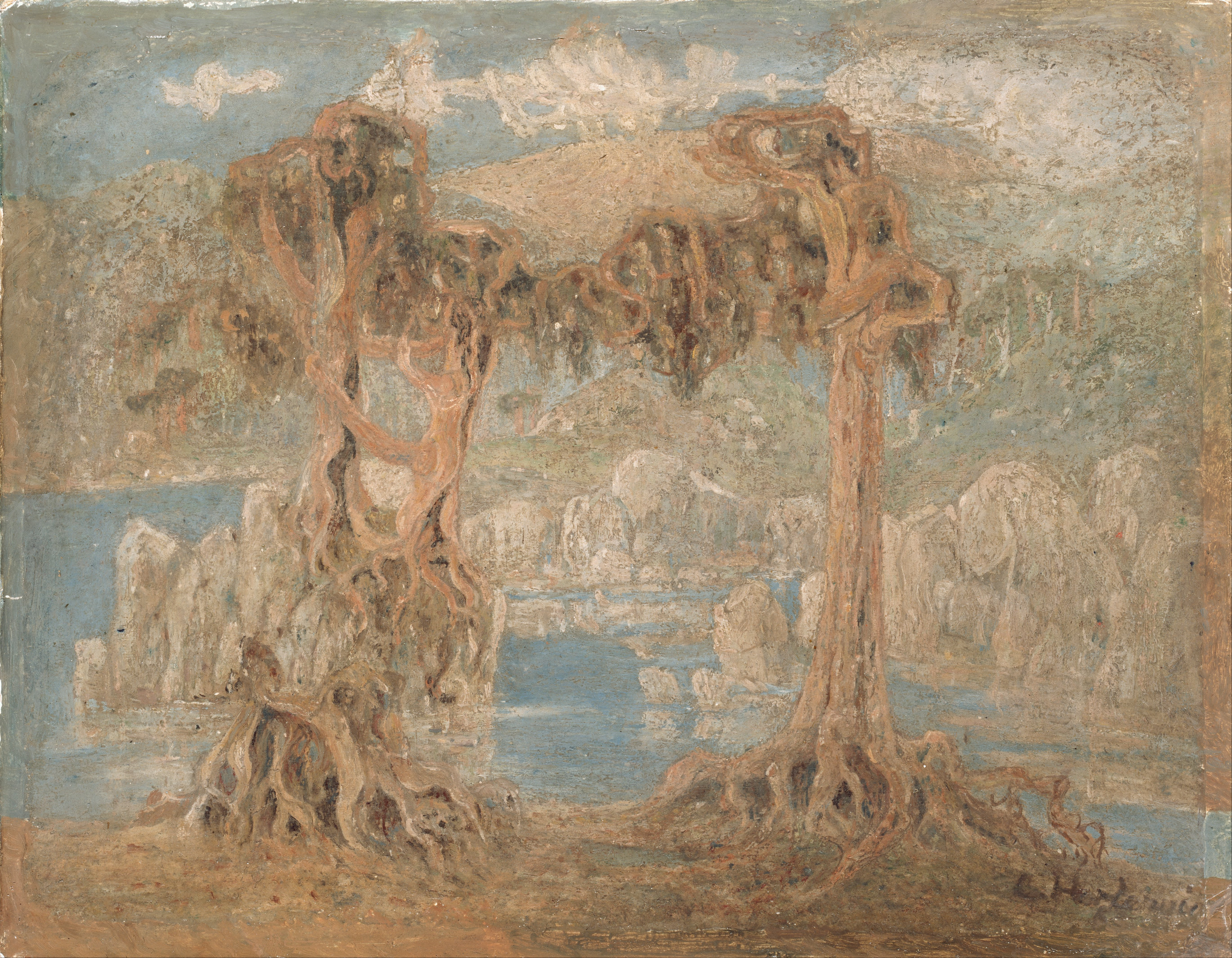
Landskap, 1902

== Sources ==
- Holger Kofoed: I Lars Hertervigs skog, Gyldendal Tiden 1991, ISBN 9788205191693
- Inger M. Renberg, Holger Koefoed och Kari Greve: Lars Hertervig – fragmenter, Labyrinth Press 2005, ISBN 9788273930316
