= Aubøsund =

Strait in Stavanger, Norway

Aubøsundet Aubøsund
- Audbøsundet
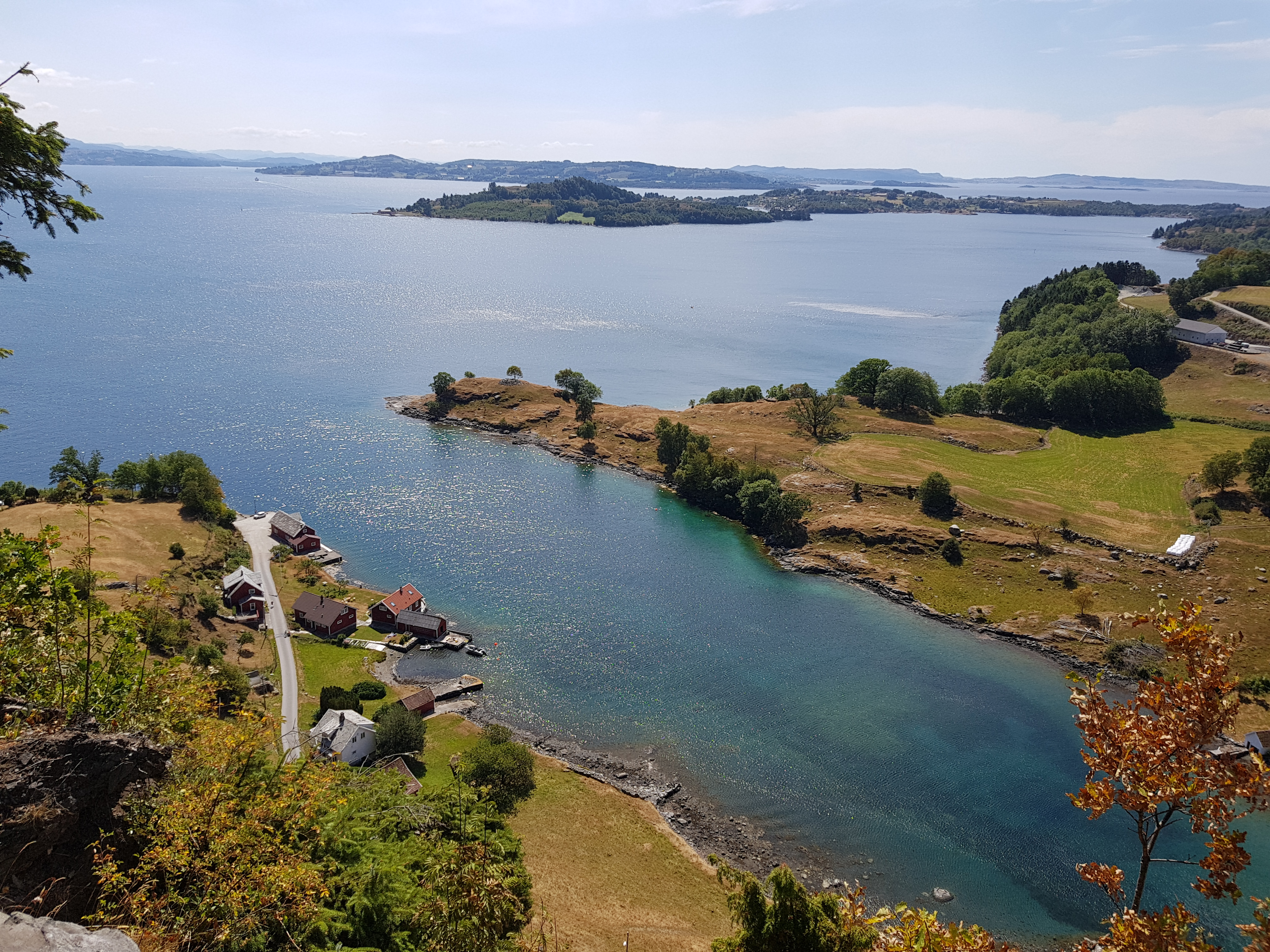
- View of the strait in 2018
- Interactive map of the fjord
- Location: Rogaland county, Norway
- Coordinates: 59.25143°N 5.85338°E
- Type: Strait
- Basin countries: Norway
- Max. length: 1 kilometre (0.62 mi)
- Islands: Aubø and Bjergøy

Aubøsund or Aubøsundet is a small strait between the islands of Aubø and Bjergøy in the Sjernarøyane archipelago in the northeastern part of the large Stavanger Municipality in Rogaland county, Norway. The strait was the site of an old trading place and transportation hub, and today there remains a wharf, store, and post office.

== History ==
The name probably comes from a combination of the Old Norse male name Audi and the word bø which means "farm". A burial mound at Steinneset suggests that the place has been inhabited since the Iron Age. Since the earliest writings in the 1500s, Aubøsund has been a croft, belonging to the farm at Aubø. Around 1860, trading and herring industry was started in Mariavigen. In 1913, the current store at the pier was built, and the old store at Mariavigen has since been used as a boathouse. There has also been fur farm, chicken farm, telephone central, gas station and marina in Aubøsund, but none of these exists today.

== Industry ==
Today, there is a general store and a post office near the pier. Otherwise, the primary industry is dominating with farms on both sides of the strait. The current store has since about 1950 has been driven by Signy Halsne. The store is very famous for its homemade lefse.

== Transportation ==
The public pier was built in 1905, and was used for passenger transport until 1978, when the pier at Nesheim took over the traffic. Today, the pier is mainly used by the doctor, vet, and various commercial transport.
