= Holger Koefoed =

Norwegian art historian (born 1945)

Holger Koefoed (born 10 September 1945) is a Norwegian art historian.

He has published books about Lars Hertervig, Ørnulf Opdahl, Bjørn Carlsen and Theodor Kittelsen, both for an adult audience and for children. He was an associate professor at the National Gallery of Norway from 1992 to 1997, and thereafter at the Oslo National Academy of the Arts.
