= Bjarte Birkeland =

Norwegian literary researcher (1920–2000)

Bjarte Birkeland (26 December 1920 – 7 April 2000) was a Norwegian literary researcher.

He was born in Fana. In 1950 and 1976 he published works about Olav Duun; in 1962 he took the dr.philos. degree with a thesis about Per Sivle. He edited the Nynorsk periodical Syn og Segn from 1960 to 1968, and was a professor at the University of Bergen from 1969 to 1984.
