= Astrid Sverresdotter Dypvik =

Norwegian journalist and historian

Astrid Sverresdotter Dypvik (born October 19, 1977) is a Norwegian journalist and historian, and was the head of Norsk Målungdom, the youth branch of the Language Organisation of Norway, from 2000 to 2002.

Dypvik was born in Lensvik in Agdenes Municipality. She received a master's degree in history from the University of Oslo with a thesis on German postwar history. As a journalist, she has written for the newspapers Morgenbladet and Klassekampen, among others, and served as op-ed and debate editor for Klassekampen. She is employed at the newspaper Nationen. In addition, she has served as an editorial board member for the historical journal Fortid.

Under her leadership, Norsk Målungdom especially worked to develop software for Nynorsk and, among other things, together with the School Student Union of Norway, organized the "Student Strike for Nynorsk Data" on September 28, 2000, in which 30,000 students went on strike.

In 2012 she published the book Det var DDR. Forteljingar om eit nedlagt land (This Was the DDR. Tales of a Land Shut Down), using a journalistic and historical method to tell the 40-year history of East Germany through individual narratives, both from those that belonged to the regime and authorities, and those that were victims of it. The book was nominated for the prize for the best nonfiction work for adults.
