= Syn og Segn =

Norwegian magazine

- Editor: Astrid Sverresdotter Dypvik (2020-present)
- Former editors: Editor (period) Rasmus Flo and Arne Garborg (1894-1900); Rasmus Flo, Arne Garborg and Halvdan Koht (1901-1906); Halvdan Koht (1907-1908); Olav Midttun (1908-1960); Magne Skodvin (1951-1959); Bjarte Birkeland (1960-1968); Berge Furre (1967-1972); Bjarne Fidjestøl (1969-1973); Andreas Skartveit (1972-1978); Sverre Tusvik (1977-1980); Astrid Brekken, Sigrid Straand and Jon Tvinnereim (1980-1983); Ottar Grepstad (1984-1988); Borghild Gramstad (1989-1882); Jan Inge Sørbø (1993-1997); Nils Rune Langeland (1998-2002); Marit Eikemo and Hilde Sandvik (2003-2006); Bente Riise (2006–2013); Knut Aastad Bråten (2014-2020)
- Categories: culture, politics
- Frequency: 4 issues per year
- Publisher: Det Norske Samlaget
- Founded: 1894
- Country: Norway
- Based in: Oslo
- Language: Norwegian Nynorsk
- Website: www.synogsegn.no

Syn og Segn is a Norwegian quarterly cultural and political periodical published in Oslo, Norway.

== History and profile ==
Syn og Segn was founded in 1894, and Rasmus Flo and Arne Garborg were the first editors. The magazine is published in Nynorsk quarterly by Det Norske Samlaget, and has been important for the development of the Nynorsk as a cultural language.

Olav Midttun was the editor-in-chief for over fifty years, from 1908 to 1960. Fagernes-based Knut Aastad Bråten was editor from 2014 to 2020, succeeding Bente Riise who had served in the post since 2006. Astrid Sverresdotter Dypvik has edited the magazine since 2020.

The number of subscribers was largest in the 1960s when it reached about 13,000. In 2004 the number of subscribers was about 2,500. The circulation in 2004 was about 3,100.

In 2010 the magazine was named "Periodical of the Year" in Norway by the Norwegian Association of Journals.

== See also ==
- List of magazines in Norway
