= La Malinconia =

La Malinconia or Malinconia (melancholy) may refer to:

- La Malinconia, the fourth movement of String Quartet No. 6 (Beethoven)
- Malinconia, the second movement of Violin Sonata No. 2 (Ysaÿe)
- La malinconia (string quartet), String Quartet No. 10, 1998, by Elena Firsova
- "Malinconia" (song), song and 1981 single by Riccardo Fogli
- Malinconia (Sibelius), Op. 20, a duet for cello & piano, a 1900 composition by Jean Sibelius
- Malinconia (album), 2007, by Gunilla Süssmann and Tanja Tetzlaff
- Malinconia 2, a 1979 composition by Theodor Berger

== See also ==
- Melancholia (disambiguation)
- Melancholy (disambiguation)
- "Malinconia, Ninfa gentile", song by Vincenzo Bellini
- "Malinconia d'amore", song by Giovanni D'Anzi
- Il castello della malinconia, a 1920 film by Augusto Genina
- Valse mélancolique, S. 214/2 by Liszt
