= Ottar Grepstad =

Norwegian Nynorsk writer (born 1953)

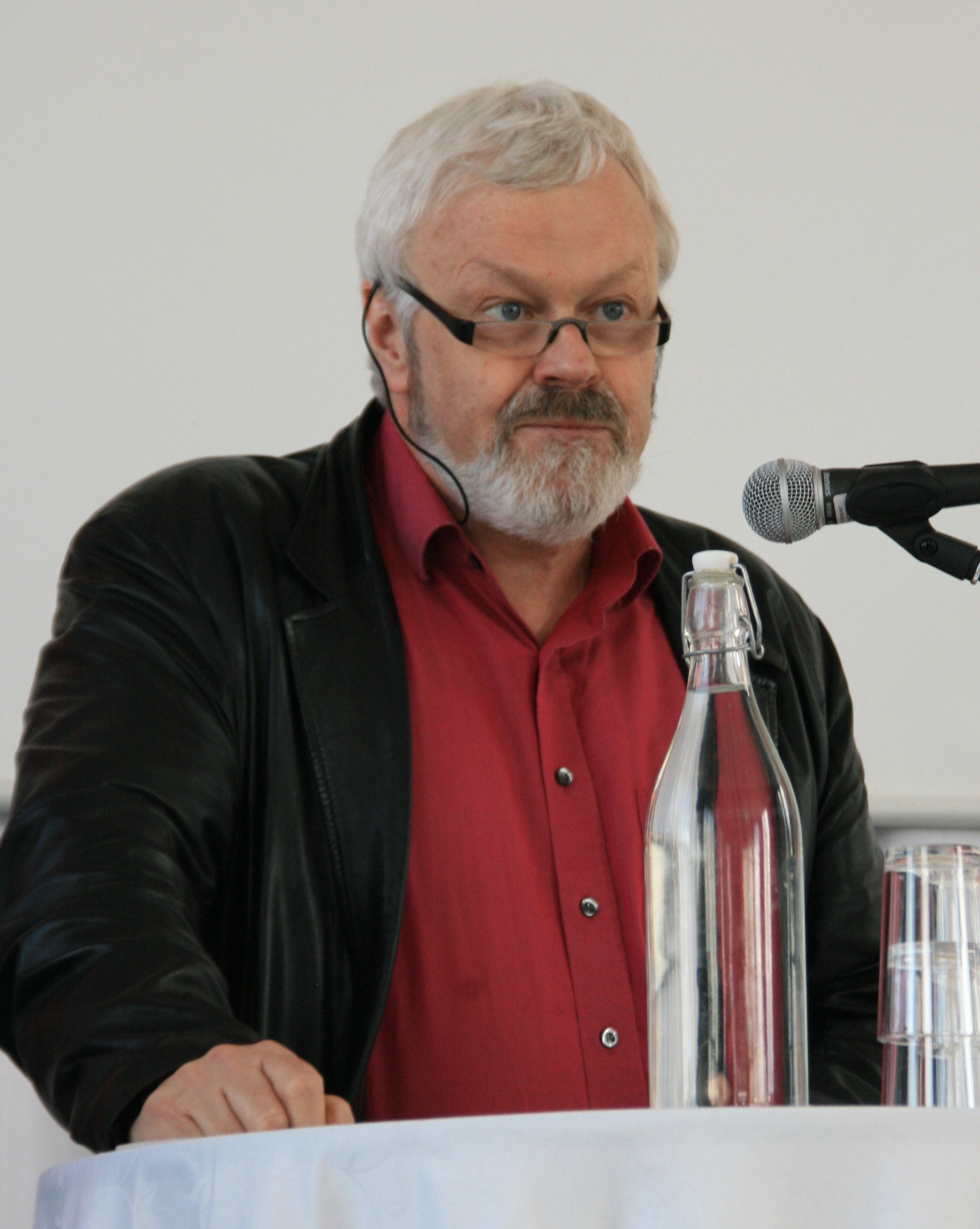
Ottar Grepstad, 2010 Photo:Vidar Iversen

Ottar Grepstad (born 1 October 1953) is a Norwegian Nynorsk writer.

He was born in Øyer Municipality. In the 1970s he was the leader of the Young Liberals of Norway for a period. From 1984 to 1988 he edited the periodical Syn og Segn. He worked in Det Norske Samlaget for many years, and has been manager for Noregs Mållag. In 1999 he became the leader of the Ivar Aasen Centre in Ørsta. This centre is owned by Nynorsk kultursentrum; which is led by Grepstad as well. From 1 January 2005 he has been a member of the Arts Council Norway, and from 2006 to 2010 he has been a board member of the Norwegian Language Council. He left the Arts Council in late 2009.

In 1997 he released the book Det litterære skattkammer. Sakprosaens teori og retorikk, which was claimed to be the "world's first theoretical book about prose". In 1999 he was awarded the Norwegian Language Prize by the Norwegian Language Council. In 2006 he released Viljen til språk. Ei nynorsk kulturhistorie and in 2010 Avisene som utvida Noreg. Nynorskpressa 1850-2010.

Grepstad resides in Volda Municipality.
