= Odd Kvaal Pedersen =

Norwegian journalist, author and translator

Odd Kvaal Pedersen (9 February 1935 – 16 March 1990) was a Norwegian journalist, author and translator.

He spent the better part of his career as cultural editor of Stavanger Aftenblad. His work in journalism was recognized by the Fritt Ord Foundation in 1986, who awarded him the Fritt Ord Honorary Award for progressive and far reaching expression of the concerns of the oppressed people of South Africa and for publicizing developing country issues.

He debuted as a fiction author at 55 years of age in 1980 with publication of the novel Dobbel frukt. By that time he had issued several African-themed non-fiction books, including Afrika i dag—og i morgen (1969), Hvit samvittighet. Rapport om apartheid (1971) and Sør-Afrika: Siste trekk (1986). In 1987 he was awarded the Norwegian Critics Prize for Literature for the documentary novel Narren og hans mester about the painter Lars Hertervig.

== Bibliography ==
- Tam tam og transistor – nonfiction (1964)
- Mer enn brød. Utviklingsland og kristent ansvar – nonfiction (1966)
- Afrika i dag—og i morgen? – nonfiction (1969)
- Hvit samvittighet. Rapport om apartheid – nonfiction (1971)
- Dobbel frukt – roman (1980)
- Møtesteder – roman (1981)
- Onkel Tom er død. Perspektiv på det religiøse Afrika – nonfiction (1982)
- Guds Kaptein – novel (1982)
- Ildsjel: et portrett av Olav Hodne – nonfiction (1984)
- Gråstein og lengsel. Peilinger i Alfred Hauges tema og litterære landskap – nonfiction (1985)
- Sør-Afrika: Siste trekk. Apartheid som mentalitet og maktsystem – nonfiction (1986)
- Narren og hans mester – novel (1987)
