= Jon Grepstad =

Norwegian freelance journalist

Jon Grepstad (born 2 July 1944) is a Norwegian freelance journalist, photographer, peace activist and former head of information of the Norwegian Language Council.

== Career ==
Jon Grepstad was born in Skien, Norway. He studied languages and literature at Wesleyan University, Middletown, Connecticut, at the University of Tours, France, and at the University of Bergen, Norway. He also read philosophy. He graduated from the University of Bergen in 1974 and later pursued his studies of English at the University of Oslo.

For a few years he was a high school teacher, in 1972–73 chairperson and general secretary of the Norwegian chapter of War Resisters' International (WRI), and in 1974–77 a research assistant at the Norwegian Council of Educational Research. From October 1979 until 1986 he worked for the Norwegian campaign against nuclear weapons, «Nei til atomvåpen», of which he was a co-founder. In 1986 he became information officer of the Norwegian Council for Teacher Education under the Ministry of Education; and in 1994–2007 he was head of information of the Norwegian Language Council, a council under the Ministry of Cultural Affairs. He retired in September 2008.

== Photography ==
Since the late 1980s Jon Grepstad has worked extensively on photography. His main interest in photography is landscapes and pinhole photography. He has written a book in English on building large format cameras, based on his own experience as a camera builder. His lengthy and thorough online article, «Pinhole Photography – History, Images, Cameras, Formulas», first published in 1996, updated regularly, is a staple source on the subject of lensless photography and has been translated into Spanish, Portuguese, Russian and Polish. The article is used in photography courses in several colleges in the US and is a major resource for pinhole photographers participating in the Worldwide Pinhole Photography Day, which takes place on the last Sunday of April every year.

== Promoting the Nynorsk variety of Norwegian ==
In later years Jon Grepstad has been involved in activities aiming to reinforce the position of the Nynorsk variety of Norwegian, one of two official varieties of Norwegian, used by 10–15 percent of the Norwegian population. His main projects have been to promote computer software for this variety of Norwegian, to supervise government offices with regard to the Norwegian Language Usage Act, which requires that these offices to a certain extent use both varieties of Norwegian, and to digitize for web publication early texts in Nynorsk. In 2002 he was awarded a prize by the Norwegian Language Association («Noregs Mållag») for his work related to the Norwegian Language Usage Act.

== Involvement in the peace movement ==
Jon Grepstad is a conscientious objector and did his alternative service in 1969–70. In the 1970s he was heavily involved in the pacifist peace movement in Norway. He was also an executive member of War Resisters' International (WRI). His main projects at this time were to transform the alternative service into a peace service, and promoting the idea of non-military defense and non-violent strategies for social change. His basically Gandhian nonviolent position was influenced by the Norwegian philosopher Arne Næss and peace researcher Johan Galtung. In 1978 he organized an international research conference on non-military defense in Oslo. In 1974–79 he was a member of a public commission appointed by the Norwegian government to evaluate and propose changes in the legislation on conscription and conscientious objection in Norway («Vernepliktsutvalget»).

In 1978 Jon Grepstad was one of the leaders of the Norwegian campaign against the neutron bomb; and in 1979 one of the initiators of the Norwegian campaign against deployment of new nuclear missiles in Europe («Nei til atomvåpen»). He later was information officer and international secretary of the campaign, which became one of the largest popular movements in post-war history in Norway. He was also one of the first Norwegian signatories of the European Nuclear Disarmament appeal for a nuclear-free Europe and had close contacts to this movement.

== Interest in languages ==
Jon Grepstad studied English and French, Latin and Italian at universities in the United States, Norway and France. As a student of English he also read Old English. In his teens he learned Esperanto, and in high school, German, in addition to English and French. In the 1980s he studied basic Russian and Greek. His interest in languages is deeply rooted, as is his interest in the relationship between language and cognition.

== Family and personal life ==
Jon Grepstad is the son of teacher Andreas Grepstad (1903–1990) and his wife Ragna Veitebergsbakke (1909–2000). His grandparents were farmers in Jølster Municipality, Norway.

== Publications ==
Jon Grepstad has published several books in Norwegian and English, has contributed to Norwegian encyclopedias and reference works and has written articles for newspapers and for Norwegian and foreign language magazines.

== Selected publications in English, Norwegian and French ==
Books:

- Camera obscura 1992–2022. Oslo 2023. ISBN 978-82-691870-8-3
- Nokre notat og notisar. Oslo 2023. ISBN 978-82-691870-6-9
- Nokre artiklar, bagatellar og ein song. Oslo 2022. ISBN 978-82-691870-4-5
- Hydra. Seksti augnekast og nokre ord. Oslo 2021. ISBN 978-82-691870-1-4
- Ferdinand Alois Grobs biletalbum – og våre handlingars utkantvegar. Oslo 2021. ISBN 978-82-691870-3-8
- Mirabilia Urbis Romae. Stort og smått i Roma. Oslo 2021. ISBN 978-82-691870-2-1
- Gente di Roma. Vandringar under Romas himmel. Oslo 2019. ISBN 978-82-691870-0-7
- Italiareiser. Oslo 2018. ISBN 978-82-993938-9-8
- Roma Stenopeica. Vandringar med camera obscura i Roma. Oslo 2018. ISBN 978-82-993938-8-1
- Roma Stenopeica. Pinhole Wanderings in Rome. Oslo 2017. ISBN 978-82-993938-7-4
- Iceland. Black and White Photographs. Oslo 2016. ISBN 978-82-993938-6-7
- Oslo Revisited. Fourteen Pinhole Photographs. Oslo 2016. ISBN 978-82-993938-5-0
- Föhr, Svolvær, Hydra. Fifteen Pinhole Photographs. Oslo 2015. ISBN 978-82-993938-4-3
- Pinhole Images 1992–2014. Oslo 2014. ISBN 978-82-993938-3-6
- Camera Obscura. Ten Pinhole Photographs. Oslo 2013. ISBN 978-82-993938-2-9
- Building a Large Format Camera. Oslo 1996, (second edition 2000). ISBN 82-993938-1-7
- Krig i vår tid? Forsvar og fredspolitikk i 1980-åra. Oslo 1979
- Transarmament Strategies and Civilian Defence for Small Nations. Oslo 1978 (Conference report, co-editor Berit G. Holm)
- Bruk av språklaboratorium i vidaregåande skular. Oslo 1975
- Mardøla : dokumentasjon og perspektiv. Oslo 1971

Selected articles:

- Pinhole Photography – History, Images, Cameras, Formulas (online article, first published 1996)
- «Nynorsk programvare – nokre milesteinar» (online article, 2000, oppdated 2009)
- «Opplæringlova og elektroniske læremiddel – førearbeid, lov og forskrift, rundskriv» (online article, 2000, oppdated 2008)
- «Språkleg jamstilling på datamaskinen». Språknytt, 3, 2000
- «Språkteknologi på norsk». Mål og makt, 1, 1999
- «Kryssarrakettane i nord og norsk politikk». Samtiden, 1, 1986
- «Stjernekrig som myte og røyndom». Syn og Segn, 4, 1985
- «Ikkje-militære forsvarsformer». Ikkevold, 3, 1984
- «Fredsbevegelsen». PaxLeksikon, bd. 7, Oslo 1983
- «Eurorakettane : utplassering i Europa og fredsbevegelsens oppgaver». Kontrast, 5–6, 1983
- «The Peace Movement in the Nordic Countries». END Papers 4, Nottingham 1982
- «Norway and the Struggle for Nuclear Disarmament». A paper prepared for the '81 World Conference against Atomic and Hydrogen Bombs, Tokyo, Hiroshima and Nagasaki, 3–9 August 1981
- Jon Grepstad: «Norway's Fight against New Nuclear Weapons». European Nuclear Disarmament: A Bulletin of Work in Progress (Bertrand Russell Peace Foundation), No. 2, 1980
- «Sivilmotstand». PaxLeksikon, bd. 5, Oslo 1980
- Jon Grepstad, Robert Polet, Jean-François Lecocq: Transarmement. Les Monographies de la Défence Civile XI. Liège 1979
- «Disarmament, Transarmament and Non-Military Defence». Supplement to WRI Newsletter No 144, May–June 1978
- «Verneplikt og militærnekting i nytt lys». Kirke og Kultur, 8, 1977 (co-author Sigmund Jarle Jacobsen)
