= Hilde Sandvik =

Norwegian journalist

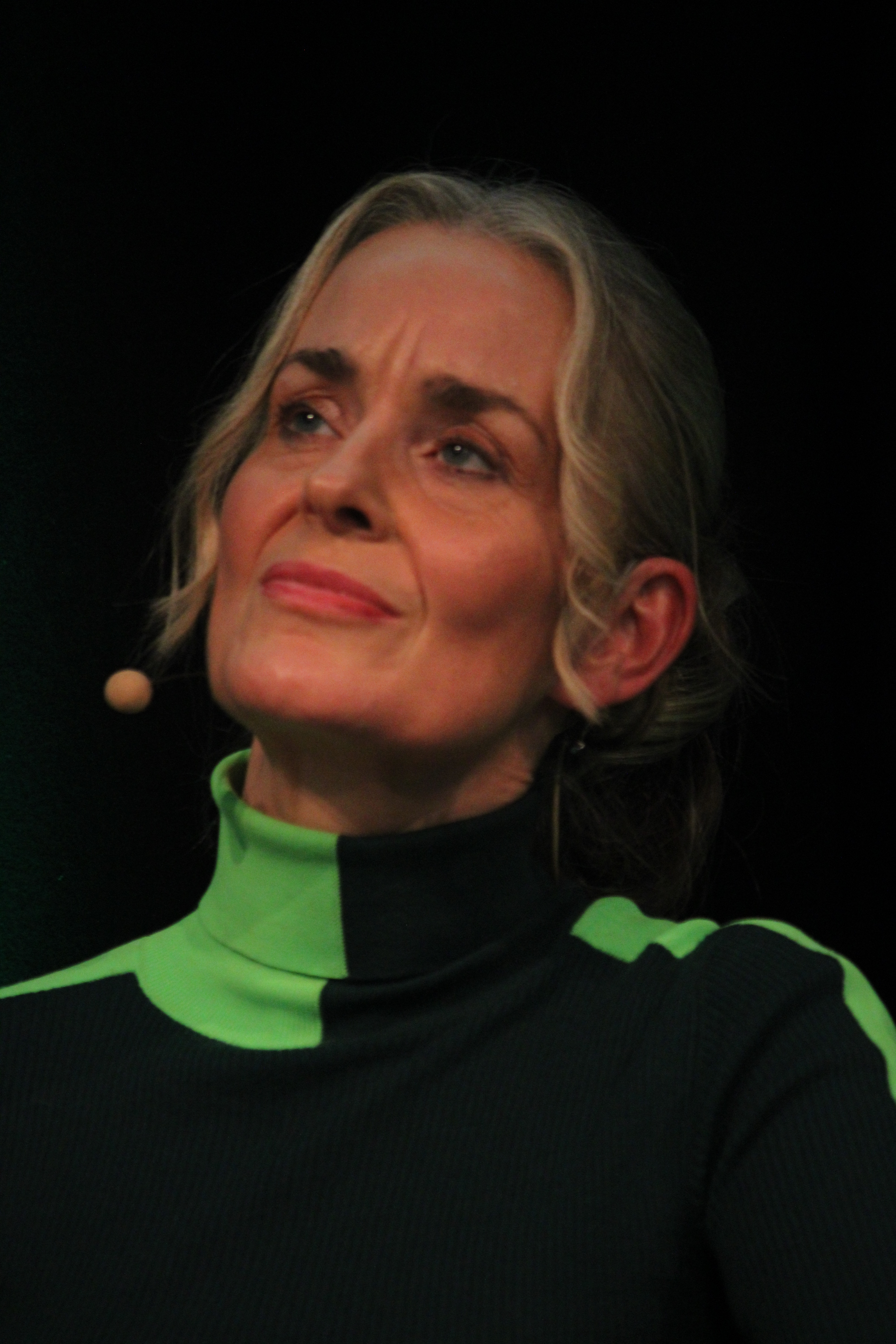
Sandvik in 2025

Hilde Sandvik (born 30 April 1970 in Erfjord) is a Norwegian journalist based in Bergen. Sandvik has a cand.philol. degree from the University of Bergen, majoring in art history. She edited the periodical Syn og Segn from 2003 to 2006, was briefly debate editor in the newspaper Dagbladet in 2005, and later journalist and debate editor in the newspaper Bergens Tidende from 2006 to 2016. She also has released several books.

Sandvik became board member of the Association of Norwegian Editors in 2013 and the Norwegian media company Amedia in 2016. In 2016 she released a digital platform, Broen.xyz, covering cultural debate and politics in the Nordics. Since 2020 Sandvik is hosting and producing the Scandinavian weekly radio program Norsken, svensken og dansken broadcast by NRK, Danmarks Radio and Sveriges Radio.

== Board positions ==
Hilde Sandvik is a member of the Extended Council of the Student Society in Bergen. The Extended Council consists of resource persons from academia, the media industry and cultural life in Bergen, and is a competence body for the Student Society. She has previously been a board member of the contemporary music festival Borealis and deputy chair of the Norwegian Journal Association.

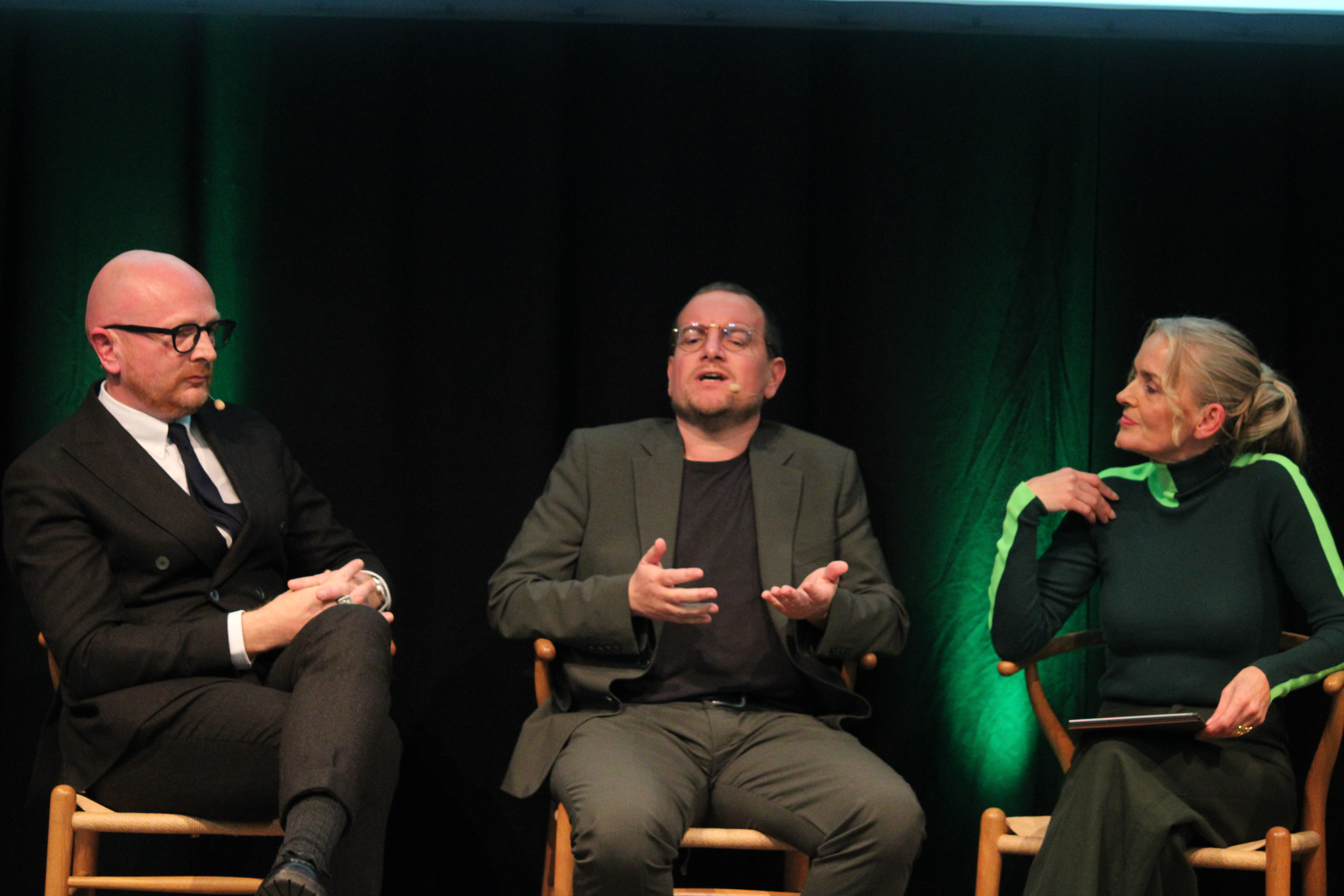
Sandvik speaking with Mads Brügger (far right) and Mikkel Andersson, November 2025

As of 2024 Hilde Sandvik is vice chair of NORD 55°. An alliance of leading Nordic cultural and media figures, including JP/Politiken (DK), Amedia (NO), and Bonnier News (SE), Sermitsiaq ( GL) along with the Finnish association Konstsamfundet. NORD 55°ambition is to bolster Nordic democracy and debate culture, creating a new infrastructure for cultural and societal debate across the Nordic countries.
