= Fortid =

- Discipline: History
- Language: Norwegian
- Edited by: Henriette Mikkelsen Hoel, Erik Tobias Taube

Publication details
- History: 2004-present
- Publisher: University of Oslo, Institute of archaeology, conservation and history (Norway)
- Frequency: Quarterly

Standard abbreviations
- ISO 4: Fortid

Indexing
- ISSN: 1504-1913

Links
- Journal homepage; Online archive

Fortid (English: Past) is a quarterly Norwegian academic journal of history run and edited by history students at the University of Oslo. The journal was established in 2004. It publishes academic essays and book reviews on all aspects of history. It is part of Tidsskriftforeningen and is distributed by InterPress. In 2006, the journal won the University of Oslo's "Best student-edited publication"-award, and the reception among both students, historians, and the wider public has been positive.

== Editors ==
As the journal is run by volunteers, the position of editor-in-chief is usually shared by two people. The following persons have been editors-in-chief:

- 2004-2005: Gunnar Jakobsen
- 2006: Jardar Sørvoll (nr. 1–3), Håkon Evju (nr. 4)
- 2007: Håkon Evju (nr. 1–2), Johannes Due Enstad & Anette Wilhelmsen (nr. 3–4)
- 2008: Johannes Due Enstad & Anette Wilhelmsen (nr. 1–3), Marie Lund Alveberg & Marthe Glad Munch-Møller (nr. 4)
- 2009: Marthe Glad Munch-Møller & Marie Lund Alveberg (nr. 1–2), Marthe Glad Munch-Møller & Øystein Idsø Viken (nr. 3), Øystein Idsø Viken & Haakon Ikonomou (nr. 4)
- 2010: Nina Maria Rud & Espen Thoen
- 2011: Kristin Li & Sveinung Kasin Boye
- 2012: Aslak Kittelsen & Henriette Mikkelsen Hoel (nr. 1–3), Henriette Mikkelsen Hoel & Erik Tobias Taube (nr. 4)
- 2013: Henriette Mikkelsen Hoel & Erik Tobias Taube (nr. 1), Erik Tobias Taube & Miriam Finset Ingvaldsen (nr. 2–3), Miriam Finset Ingvaldsen & Henrik Mathiesen (nr. 4).
- 2014: Henrik Mathiesen & Fredrikke Holt Skråmm.
- 2014-2015: Mari Torsdotter Hauge
- 2015-2016: Nora Rodin & Skage A. Østberg
- 2017-2018: Anna-Marie S. Nesheim & Even N. Bergseng
- 2018-2019: Eli Morken Farstad & Erlend Lundvall
- 2019-2020: Charlotte Aslesen & Jonas Fostervoll Øverland

== Curriculum ==
Articles from Fortid have been used as curriculum by the University of Tromsø, the University of Nordland and the University of Oslo.
