= Melancholy II =

1996 book by Jon Fosse

- Author: Jon Fosse
- Original title: Melancholia II
- Translator: Eric Dickens
- Language: Norwegian (Nynorsk)
- Publisher: Det Norske Samlaget
- Publication date: 1996
- Publication place: Norway
- English publication date: September 2014
- Pages: 112
- ISBN: 9788252147070

Melancholy II, original title Melancholia II, is a 1996 novella by the Norwegian writer Jon Fosse. It is set in Stavanger, in early autumn of 1902, the year of Norwegian artist Lars Hertervig's death, and is told from the perspective of Hertervig's fictitious sister Oline. The novella covers one day, the day that Oline learns that her brother Sivert is dying. Sivert's wife, Signe, tells her in the morning that Sivert wants to speak to her, but Oline is frail, and forgetful, and she only sits down at Sivert's bed later in the day when he has already died. Oline is still mourning Lars, and large parts of the novella describe Oline's memories of Lars. The book is the sequel to Fosse's 1995 novel Melancholy, which is about Hertervig's time as a student.

== Reception ==
Øystein Rottem of Dagbladet wrote: "On one level this is a shiveringly reductive novel. Here existence is pressed down to the most elementary level: the oral and anal, food and feces." Rottem wrote that the story also has a religious aspect: "The connection between these two layers makes Melancholy II one of Fosse's most consistent works—and that is no small feat! You won't become happier by reading the book, but it grabs us more intensely than the vast majority of what otherwise is written nowadays."

Publishers Weekly wrote in 2014, "In this coda to the acclaimed Melancholy, Fosse’s presentation of commonplace events is almost unbearably intense. ... Admirers of the first book will find this novel subtler and more profound than its predecessor, and new readers will discover a stunning, haunting meditation on age."
