= Knut Aastad Bråten =

Norwegian magazine editor

Knut Aastad Bråten (born 1976) is a Norwegian magazine editor.

He is a grandson of ski jumper Johanne Kolstad.

An ethnologist by education, he edited the Norwegian folk music magazine Spelemannsbladet from 2007. He is an able langeleik player himself. In 2010 the magazine was discontinued but resurfaced as Folkemusikk. In 2014 he took over as editor of Syn og Segn.
