= Lars Hertervig =

Norwegian painter (1830–1902)

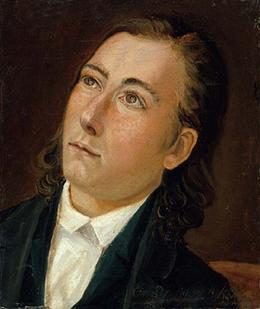
- Lars Hertervig (1851), portrait by Niels Bjørnsen Møller (1827–1887)
- Born: 16 February 1830; Borgøy in Tysvær, Norway
- Died: 6 January 1902 (aged 71)
- Occupation: painter

Lars Hertervig (16 February 1830 – 6 January 1902) was a Norwegian painter. His semi-fantastical work with motives from the coastal landscape in the traditional district of Ryfylke is regarded as one of the peaks of Norwegian painting.

== Life and career ==
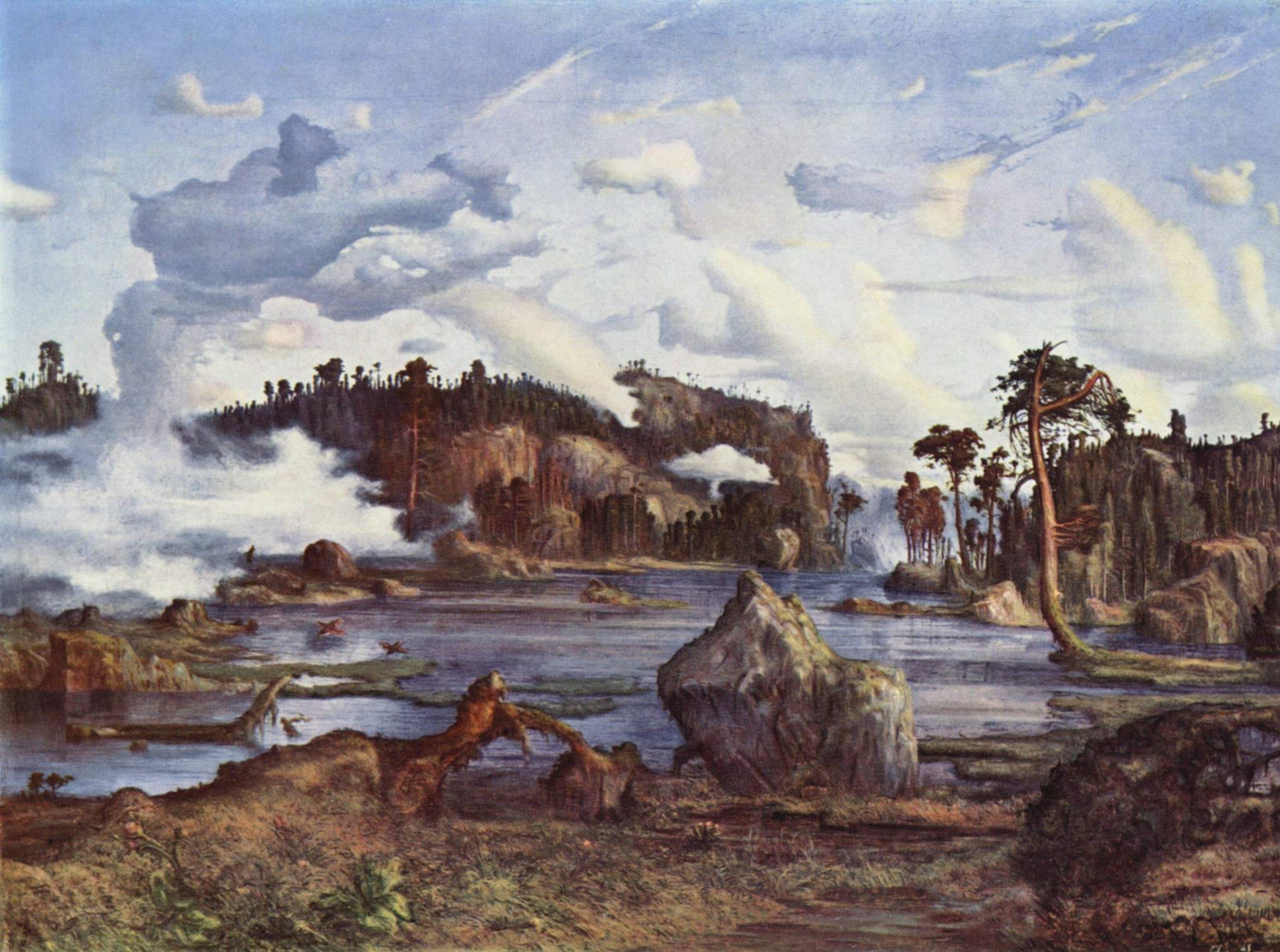
Skogtjern (Forest Lake). Oil on canvas, 1865

Lars Hertervig was born in 1830 at Borgøy (in the present-day Tysvær Municipality) in Norway, on the west coast of Norway, north of Stavanger. His family were poor, Quaker farmers. Hertervig studied painting at the Arts Academy of Düsseldorf from 1852, as the private pupil of Hans Gude. He is associated with the Düsseldorf school of painting.

In 1854, due to a cruel prank played by his fellow students, he experienced a temporary mental breakdown, and moved back to the Stavanger area. In October 1856, Hertervig entered Gaustad asylum.

His last 30 years he struggled financially, and finally ended up at the poorhouse. He could not afford to paint with oil on canvas, and several works from this period are watercolors and gouache on paper not meant for painting, sometimes using bits of papers glued together with homemade rye flour paste.

His artistic breakthrough was posthumous, coming at the 1914 Jubilee Exhibition in Kristiania (now Oslo), twelve years after his death in Stavanger.

== Popular culture ==
Odd Kvaal Pedersen wrote Narren og hans mester, a documentary about Lars Hertervig in 1987. Paal-Helge Haugen wrote Hertervig: Ein opera in 1995.Jon Fosse created an homage to Hertervig with his 1995 novel Melancholia I and his 1996 sequel Melancholy II. Fosse also wrote the libretto for Melancholia, an opera adaptation by Georg Friedrich Haas, which premiered at the Opera Garnier in Paris on 9 June 2008 on stage by Stanislas Nordey (Laurence Olivier Award 2008 for a new opera) and costumes of Raoul Fernandez.

== Gallery ==
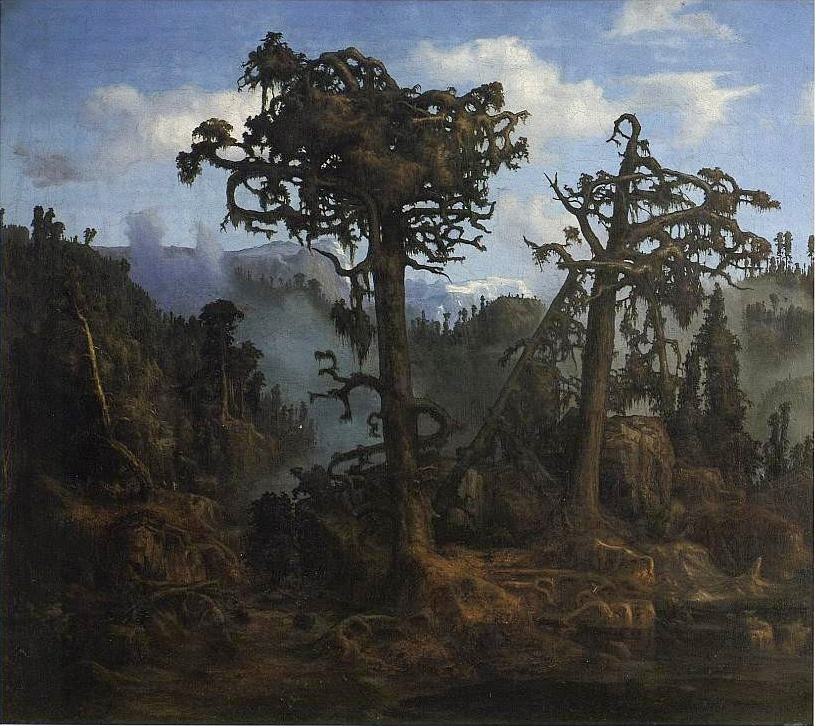
Old Pine Trees, 1865

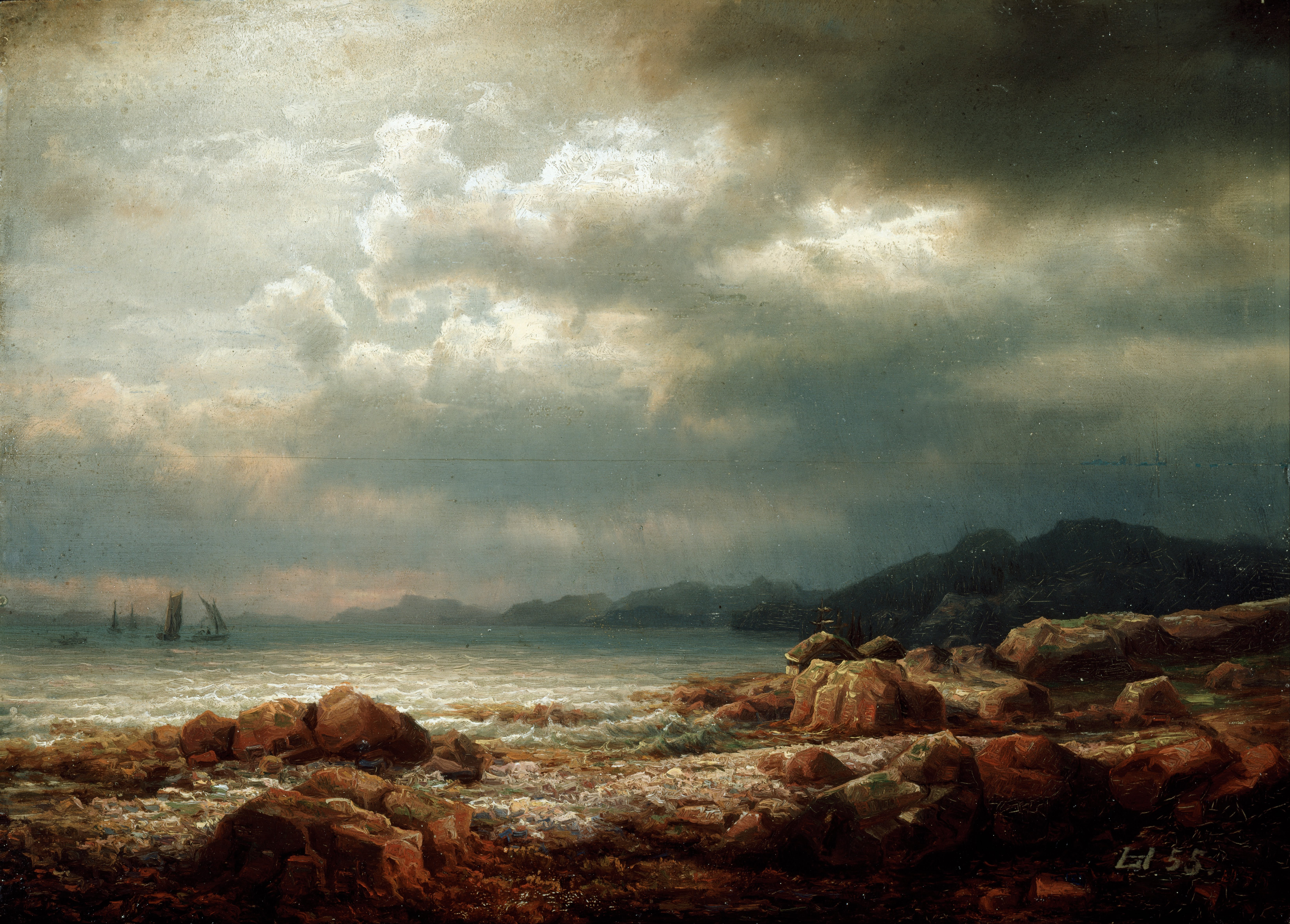
Coastal Landscape, 1855

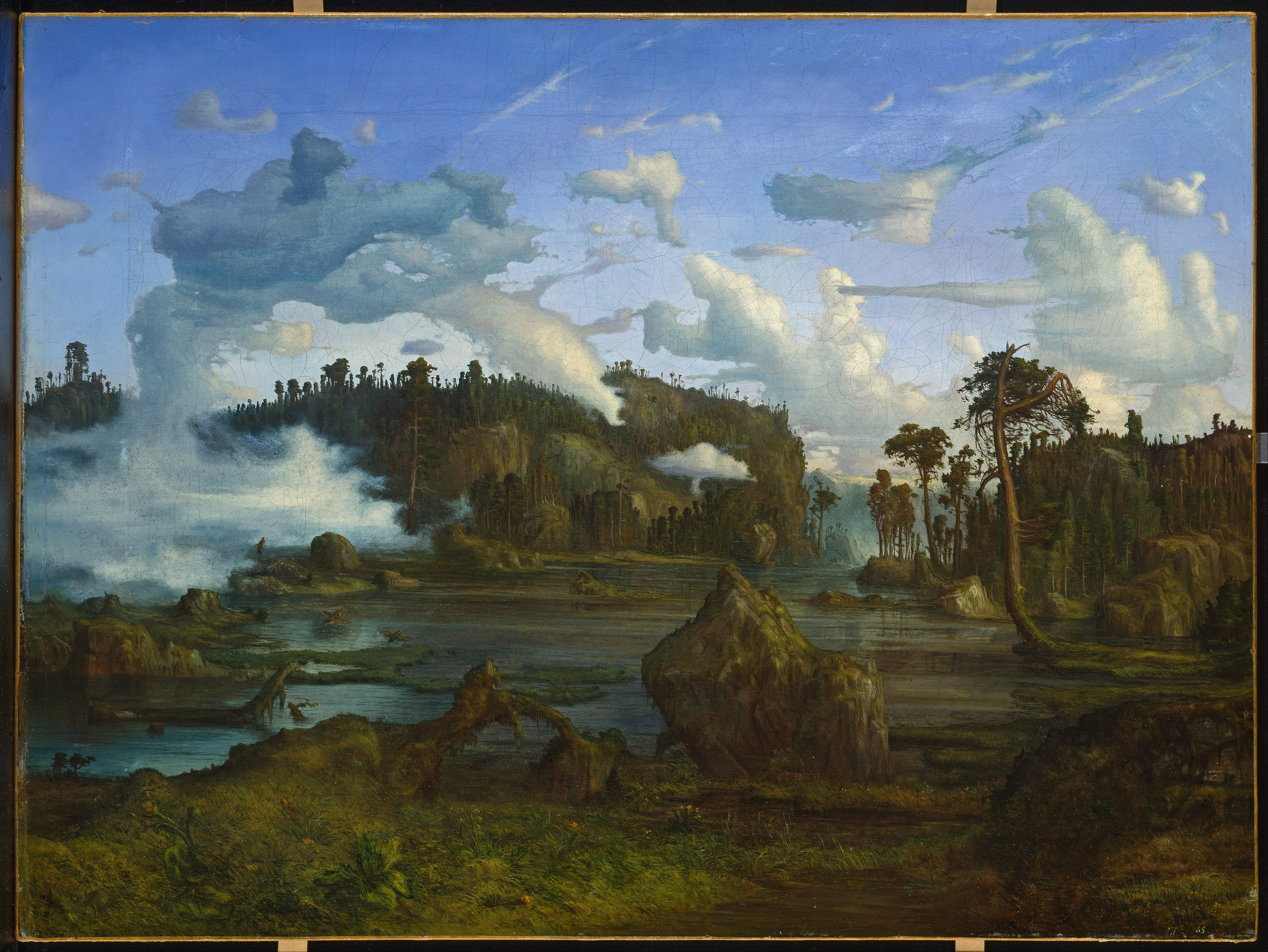
The Tarn, 1865

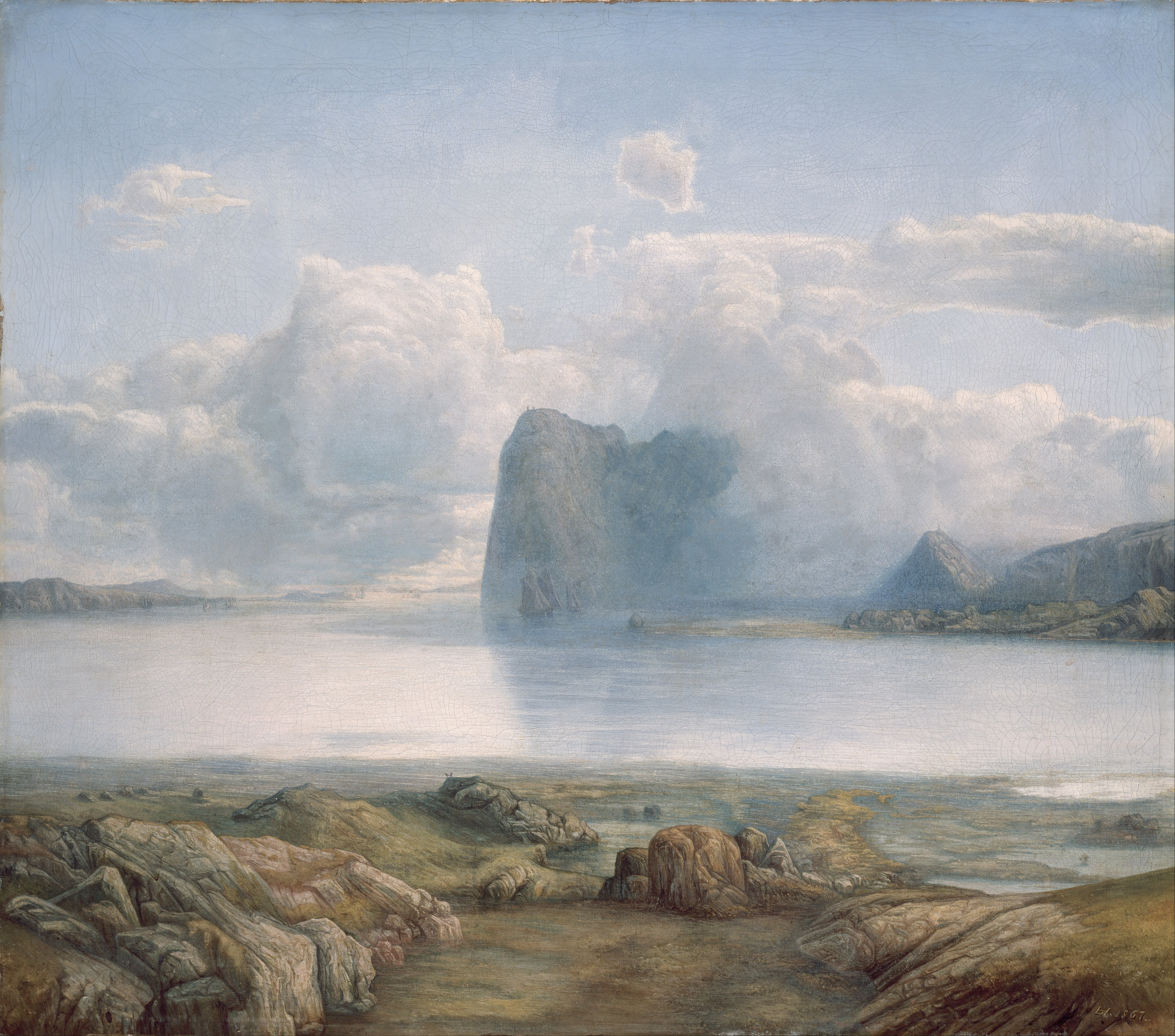
Borgøy Island, 1867

== Other sources ==
- Borgen, Trond (2005) Et indre eksil : et essay om Lars Hertervigs papirarbeider (Wigestrand Forlags AS) ISBN 82-8140-027-7
- Fosse, Jon (1995) Melancholia I-II (Det Norske Samlaget) ISBN 978-8252155341
- Koefoed, Holger (1984) Lars Hertervig : lysets maler (Gyldendal Norsk Forlag) ISBN 82-05-14982-8
- Koefoed, Holger (1991) I Lars Hertervigs skog (Gyldendal Norsk Forlag) ISBN 82-05-19169-7
- Moe, Ole Henrik (1989) Lars Hertervig, en norsk malertragedie (Blønda) ISBN 978-8788978209

== Related reading ==
- Inger M. Renberg, Holger Koefoed and Kari Greve (2005) Lars Hertervig : fragmenter : arbeider på papir 1868-1902 (Labyrinth Press) ISBN 978-82-7393-031-6
