= Melancholia (Lucas Cranach the Elder, Copenhagen) =

Painting by Lucas Cranach the Elder

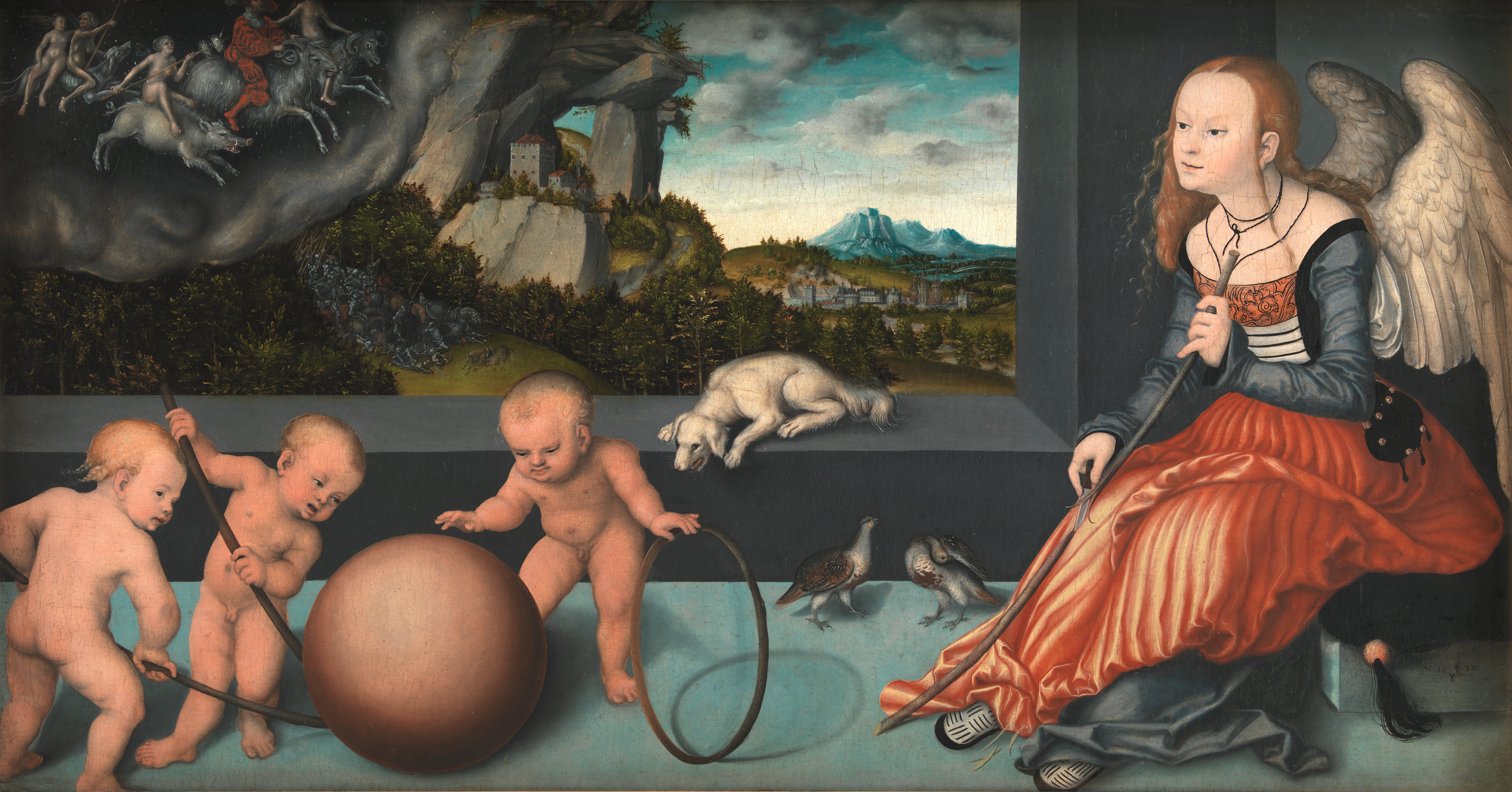
Melancholia, 1532, oil on panel, 51 cm × 97 cm (20 in × 38 in), National Gallery of Denmark

Melancholia is an oil-on-panel painting by the German painter Lucas Cranach the Elder, created in 1532. It is held in the National Gallery of Denmark in Copenhagen.

== Subject and composition ==
Melancholia depicts three naked babies who, with the help of sticks, try to roll a large ball through the hoop. A winged woman, lost in thought, is slicing a cane, perhaps intending to make another hoop. She is the personification of melancholy, similar to the winged genius from the engraving of the same name by Albrecht Dürer, executed 18 years before the painting of Cranach.

According to the ideals of the Renaissance, the whole world was based on analogies. So, melancholy at that time was associated with Saturn, a dog, carpentry. Many details of the picture are a reference to these analogies: the jump of witches in a black cloud, and an army in which soldiers fall from their horses.

The composition of the painting is distinctly horizontal. The Unterlinden Museum in Colmar owns a vertical version from the same year which presents a number of similarities.

== Bibliography ==
- Nicolas Barker: A poet in Paradise: Lord Lindsay and Christian art, 2000, p. 98.
- Charles Zika: The Wild Cavalcade in Lucas Cranach’s Melancholia Painting: Witchcraft and Sexual Disorder in 16th Century Germany, 1997, p. 65–70, p. 75, p. 79, ill. fig. 13+14
- (in German) Günter Bandmann: Melancholie und Musik: Ikonographische Studien, 1960, pp. 73f, ill. fig. 28
- Raymond Klibansky: Saturn and Melancholy: Studies in the History of Natural Philosophy, Religion and Art, 1964, p. 383
- (in Italian) Cranach: l’altro rinascimento, 2010, cat. 12, pp. 164 and 16, ill. pp. 166–167
