= Melancholy (novel) =

1995 book by Jon Fosse

- Author: Jon Fosse
- Original title: Melancholia I
- Translator: Grethe Kvernes; Damion Searls
- Language: Norwegian (Nynorsk)
- Publisher: Det Norske Samlaget
- Publication date: 1995
- Publication place: Norway
- English publication date: 1 November 2006
- Pages: 275
- ISBN: 9788252145618

Melancholy, original title Melancholia I is a 1995 novel by the Norwegian writer Jon Fosse. It is about the Norwegian painter Lars Hertervig (1830–1902) and his time as a young student in Düsseldorf, where he, agonised by unrequited love and doubt in his art, is driven toward a mental breakdown.

The book was awarded the Melsom Prize and the Sunnmøre Prize. It was followed by a 1996 sequel, Melancholy II, which is set on the day of Hertervig's death. The first part of Melancholy I was the basis for Georg Friedrich Haas' 2008 opera Melancholia.

== Plot ==
Fosse has combined historical fact with fiction to write a novel that begins with the story of the 19th-century Norwegian painter Lars Hertervig, who painted stunning landscapes. Lars suffered from mental illness and died in poverty in 1902. In the first part of the book, the author delves into Hertervig's mind during his student days, when he suffered a severe nervous breakdown.

As a student at the Düsseldorf Academy, Hertervig was paralyzed by paranoia and madly in love with Helene Winkelmann, the fifteen-year-old daughter of his landlady. Hertervig's obsession with Helene ends up with him on the streets. He desperately tries to re-enter the Winkelmanns' apartment, but ends up in a mental hospital, where the doctor sees excessive masturbation as the cause of his problems. In the last section of the first part, whose plot the author sets in the early 1990s, we are introduced to the also disturbed writer Widme, who, inspired by Herterwig's painting "From the Borgias", like Fosse himself, wants to write a novel about the painter. The plot of the second part of Melancholia is set in 1902 and told from the perspective of his fictional sister Ulina.

== Reception ==
Publishers Weekly wrote in 2006: "In this wild stream-of-consciousness narrative, Fosse delves into Hertervig's mind as the events of one day precipitate his mental breakdown. Fosse's prose, which often affects a childlike quality, might put off some readers, but many gorgeous passages and Fosse's pursuit of the 'glimmer of the divine' in art make this a powerful book."
