= Sjernarøy Municipality =

Former municipality in Rogaland, Norway

Sjernarøy Municipality Sjernarøy herred
- Former municipality
- Sjernarø herred (historic name)
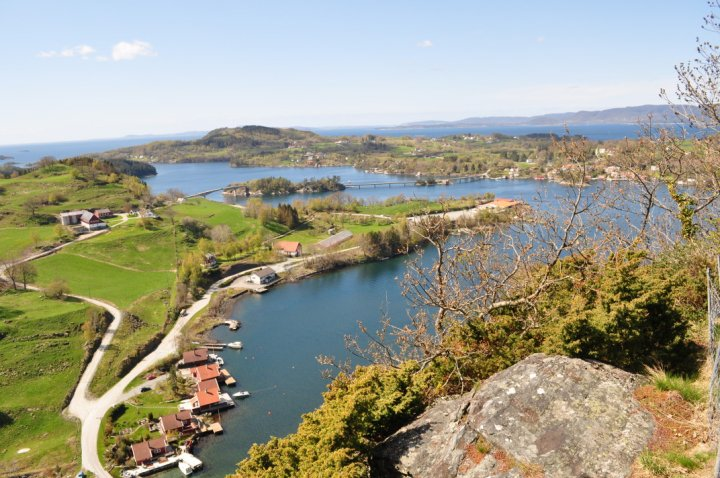
- View of the Aubø farm

- Rogaland within Norway

- Sjernarøy within Rogaland
- Coordinates: 59°15′13″N 05°48′54″E
- Country: Norway
- County: Rogaland
- District: Ryfylke
- Established: 1 Jan 1868
  - Preceded by: Nærstrand Municipality
- Disestablished: 1 Jan 1965
  - Succeeded by: Finnøy Municipality
- Administrative centre: Kyrkjøy island

Government
  - Mayor (1963–1964): Johannes Kleiberg

Area (upon dissolution)
  - Total: 38.2 km^{2} (14.7 sq mi)
  - Rank: #480 in Norway
- Highest elevation: 265 m (869 ft)

Population (1964)
  - Total: 816
  - Rank: #499 in Norway
  - Density: 21.4/km^{2} (55/sq mi)
  - Change (10 years): ▼ −11.8%
- Demonym: Sjernarøybu

Official language
  - Norwegian form: Nynorsk
- Time zone: UTC+01:00 (CET)
  - Summer (DST): UTC+02:00 (CEST)
- ISO 3166 code: NO-1140

Sjernarøy is a former municipality in Rogaland county, Norway. The 38.2-square-kilometre (14.7 sq mi) municipality existed from 1868 until its dissolution in 1965. The area is now part of Stavanger Municipality in the traditional district of Ryfylke. The administrative centre was located on the island of Kyrkjøy, where the Sjernarøy Church is located.

Prior to its dissolution in 1965, the 38.2-square-kilometre (14.7 sq mi) municipality was the 480th largest by area out of the 525 municipalities in Norway. Sjernarøy Municipality was the 499th most populous municipality in Norway with a population of about 816. The municipality's population density was 21.4 inhabitants per square kilometre (55/sq mi) and its population had decreased by 11.8% over the previous 10-year period.

== General information ==
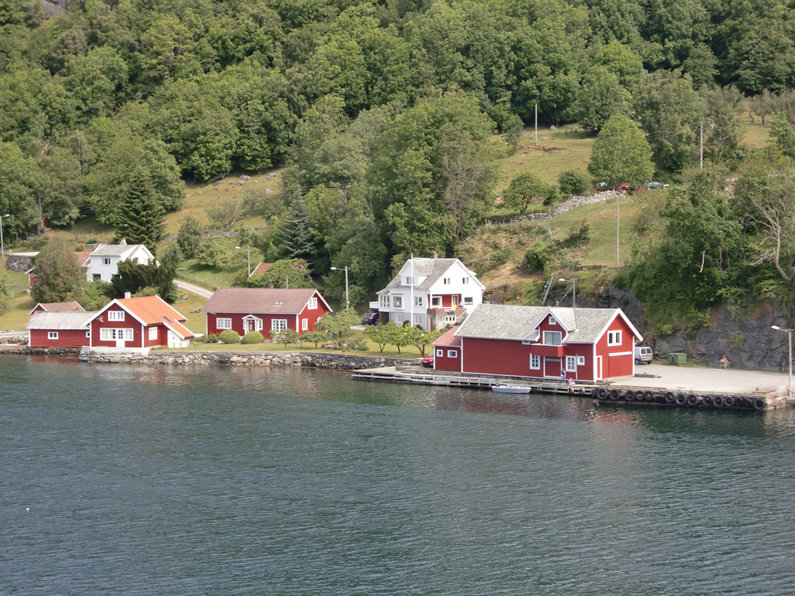
Aubøsund

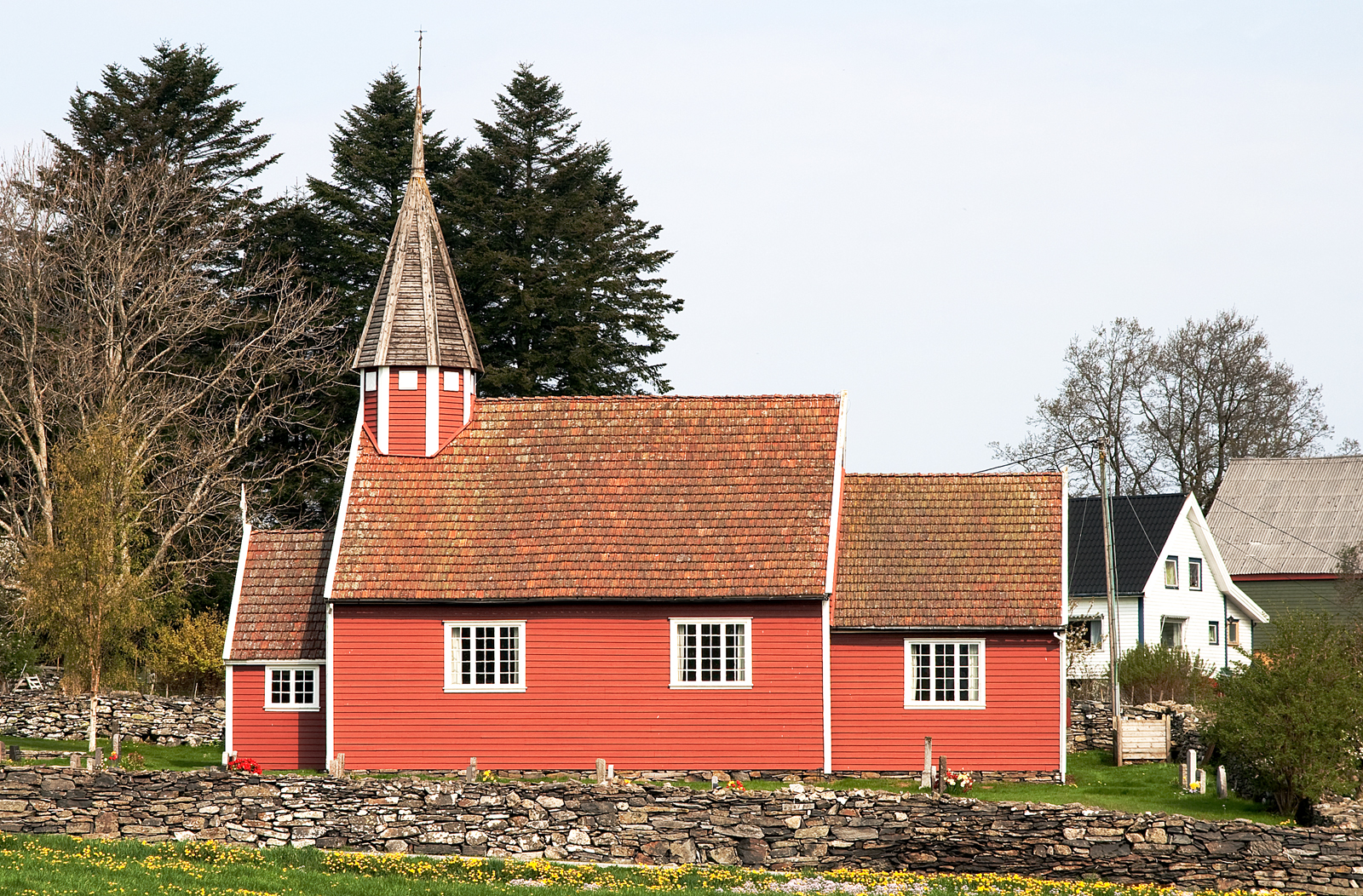
Sjernarøy Church

The municipality of Sjernarø (the spelling was later changed to Sjernarøy) was established on 1 January 1868 when the old Nærstrand Municipality was divided into two: the areas located north of the Boknafjorden (population: 1,680) was renamed as Hinderaa Municipality and the islands located in the fjord to the southeast (population: 922) became the new Sjærnarø Municipality.

During the 1960s, there were many municipal mergers across Norway due to the work of the Schei Committee. On 1 January 1965, Sjernarøy Municipality ceased to exist and the following areas were merged to form a much larger Finnøy Municipality:

- all of Finnøy Municipality (population: 1,716)
- all of Sjernarøy Municipality (population: 819)
- the "Fisterøyene" islands from Fister Municipality (population: 246)
- the parts of Jelsa Municipality located on the island of Ombo (population: 89), except for the Buergårdene which joined Suldal Municipality

In 2020, Finnøy Municipality (and the area of the former Sjernarøy Municipality) became a part of Stavanger Municipality.

=== Name ===
The municipality (originally the parish) is named after the Sjernarøyane islands (Old Norse: Sjarnarøyjar). The meaning of the first element is uncertain. It may come from the genitive case of the word sjǫrn which might be connected with the word sjau, which is an old spelling for the number seven (there are 7 inhabited islands in the archipelago). Another meaning could be based on the word serða which is a vulgar term for "intercourse" (many phallus-shaped stones have been found in the island group). The last element is the plural form of the word øy which means "island".

Historically, the name of the municipality was spelled Sjernarø. On 3 November 1917, a royal resolution changed the spelling of the name of the municipality to Sjernarøy. The letter y was added to the end of the word to "Norwegianize" the name (ø is the Danish word for "island" and øy is the Norwegian word).

=== Churches ===
The Church of Norway had one parish (sokn) within Sjernarøy Municipality. At the time of the municipal dissolution, it was part of the Nedstrand prestegjeld and the Ryfylke prosti (deanery) in the Diocese of Stavanger.

Churches in Sjernarøy Municipality
Parish (sokn)	Church name	Location of the church	Year built
Sjernarøy	Sjernarøy Church	Kyrkjøy in Sjernarøyane	1647
Sjernarøy	Jørstad Church	Jørstadvågen on Ombo	1929

== Geography ==
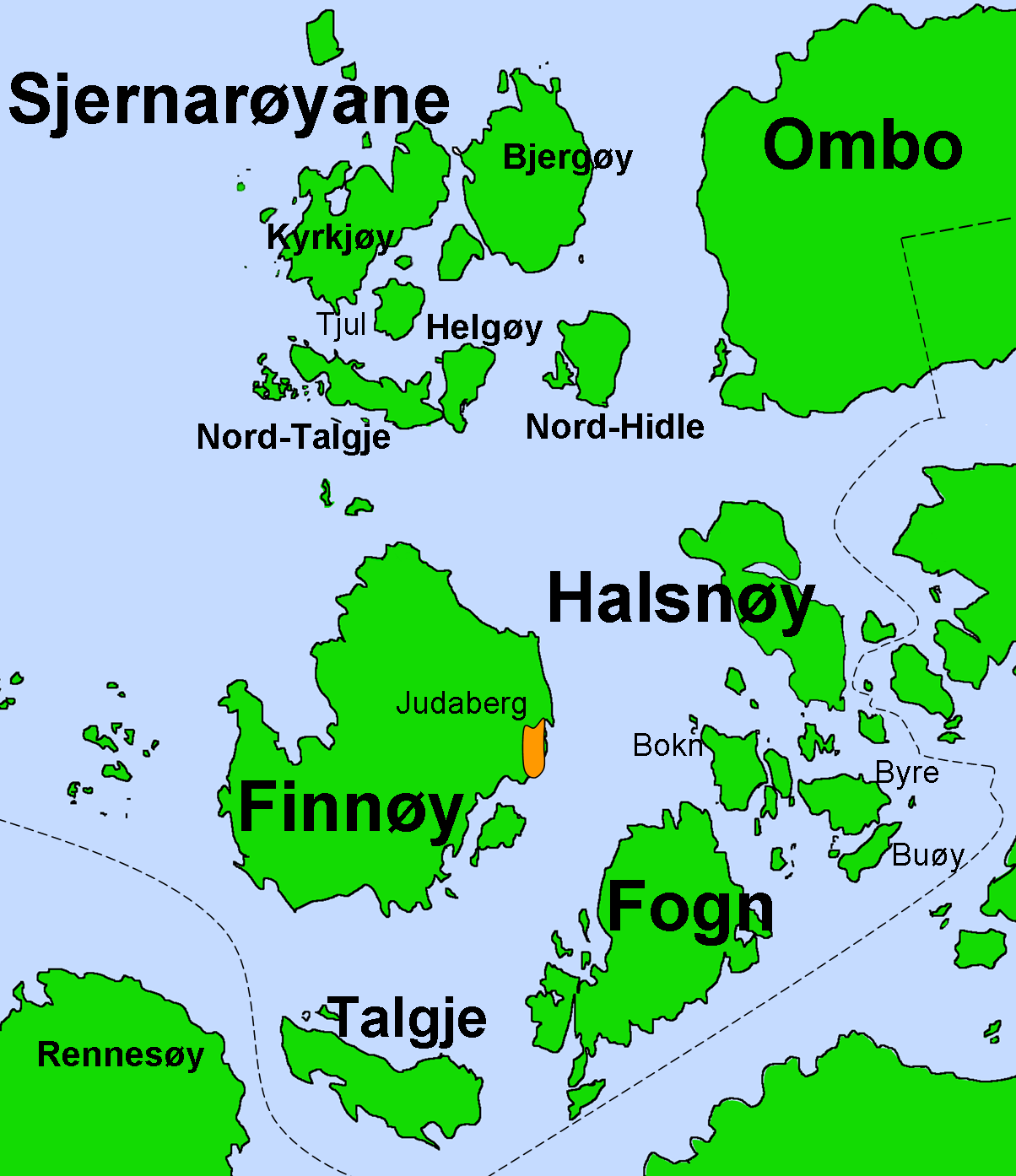
Sjernarøy Municipality included the Sjernarøyane islands on the top of this map, plus the western part of Ombo

Sjernarøy Municipality included the Sjernarøyane islands plus the western part of the island of Ombo in the Boknafjorden for a total of 38.2 square kilometres (14.7 sq mi) of land. The inhabited islands included Kyrkjøy, Bjergøy, Eriksholmen, Tjul, Nord-Hidle, Aubø, Helgøy, Nord-Talgje, and the western part of Ombo. The uninhabited islands included Hestholmen, Finnborg, Lundarøynå, Norheimsøynå, Norheimslamholmen, Staup, Fiskholmane, as well as many other smaller islands. The highest point in the municipality was the 265-metre (869 ft) tall mountain Søllbergsfjellet on the western part of the island of Ombo.

Nedstrand Municipality was located to the north, Jelsa Municipality was located to the northeast, Hjelmeland Municipality was located to the east, Fister Municipality was located to the southeast, Finnøy Municipality was located to the south, and Bokn Municipality was located to the west (on the far side of the Boknafjorden.

== Government ==
While it existed, Sjernarøy Municipality was responsible for primary education (through 10th grade), outpatient health services, senior citizen services, welfare and other social services, zoning, economic development, and municipal roads and utilities. The municipality was governed by a municipal council of directly elected representatives. The mayor was indirectly elected by a vote of the municipal council. The municipality was under the jurisdiction of the Ryfylke District Court and the Gulating Court of Appeal.

=== Municipal council ===
The municipal council (Heradsstyre) of Sjernarøy Municipality was made up of 15 representatives that were elected to four year terms. The tables below show the historical composition of the council by political party.

Sjernarøy heradsstyre 1963–1965
Party name (in Nynorsk)	Number of representatives
Local List(s) (Lokale lister)	15
Total number of members:	15
Note: On 1 January 1965, Sjernarøy Municipality became part of Finnøy Municipality.

Sjernarøy heradsstyre 1959–1963
Party name (in Nynorsk)	Number of representatives
Local List(s) (Lokale lister)	15
Total number of members:	15

Sjernarøy heradsstyre 1955–1959
Party name (in Nynorsk)	Number of representatives
Local List(s) (Lokale lister)	15
Total number of members:	15

Sjernarøy heradsstyre 1951–1955
Party name (in Nynorsk)	Number of representatives
Local List(s) (Lokale lister)	12
Total number of members:	12

Sjernarøy heradsstyre 1947–1951
Party name (in Nynorsk)	Number of representatives
Local List(s) (Lokale lister)	12
Total number of members:	12

Sjernarøy heradsstyre 1945–1947
Party name (in Nynorsk)	Number of representatives
Local List(s) (Lokale lister)	12
Total number of members:	12

Sjernarøy heradsstyre 1937–1941*
Party name (in Nynorsk)	Number of representatives
Local List(s) (Lokale lister)	12
Total number of members:	12
Note: Due to the German occupation of Norway during World War II, no elections were held for new municipal councils until after the war ended in 1945.

=== Mayors ===
The mayor (Nynorsk: ordførar) of Sjernarøy Municipality was the political leader of the municipality and the chairperson of the municipal council. The following people have held this position:

- 1868–1885: Mikkel Eeg Olson Ubøe
- 1886–1901: Johannes Martin Johannessen Furre
- 1902–1904: Nils Andreas Mikkelson Hidle
- 1905–1916: Rasmus Jakobson Hidle (V)
- 1917–1919: Nils Andreas Mikkelson Hidle
- 1919–1922: Nils Joneson Hidle
- 1922–1925: Nils Andreas Mikkelson Hidle
- 1925–1928: Nils Joneson Hidle
- 1928–1931: Konrad Norheim
- 1933–1937: Jakob Rasmusson Hidle
- 1937–1941: Konrad Norheim
- 1942–1945: Bjørn Maurland (NS)
- 1946–1947: Daniel Tveita
- 1947–1951: Ola Nygård-Talge
- 1951–1955: Daniel Tveita
- 1955–1959: Ola Hauge Eik
- 1959–1963: Jon Hidle
- 1963–1964: Johannes Kleiberg

== See also ==
- List of former municipalities of Norway
