= Melancholia (Lucas Cranach the Elder, Colmar) =

Painting by Lucas Cranach the Elder

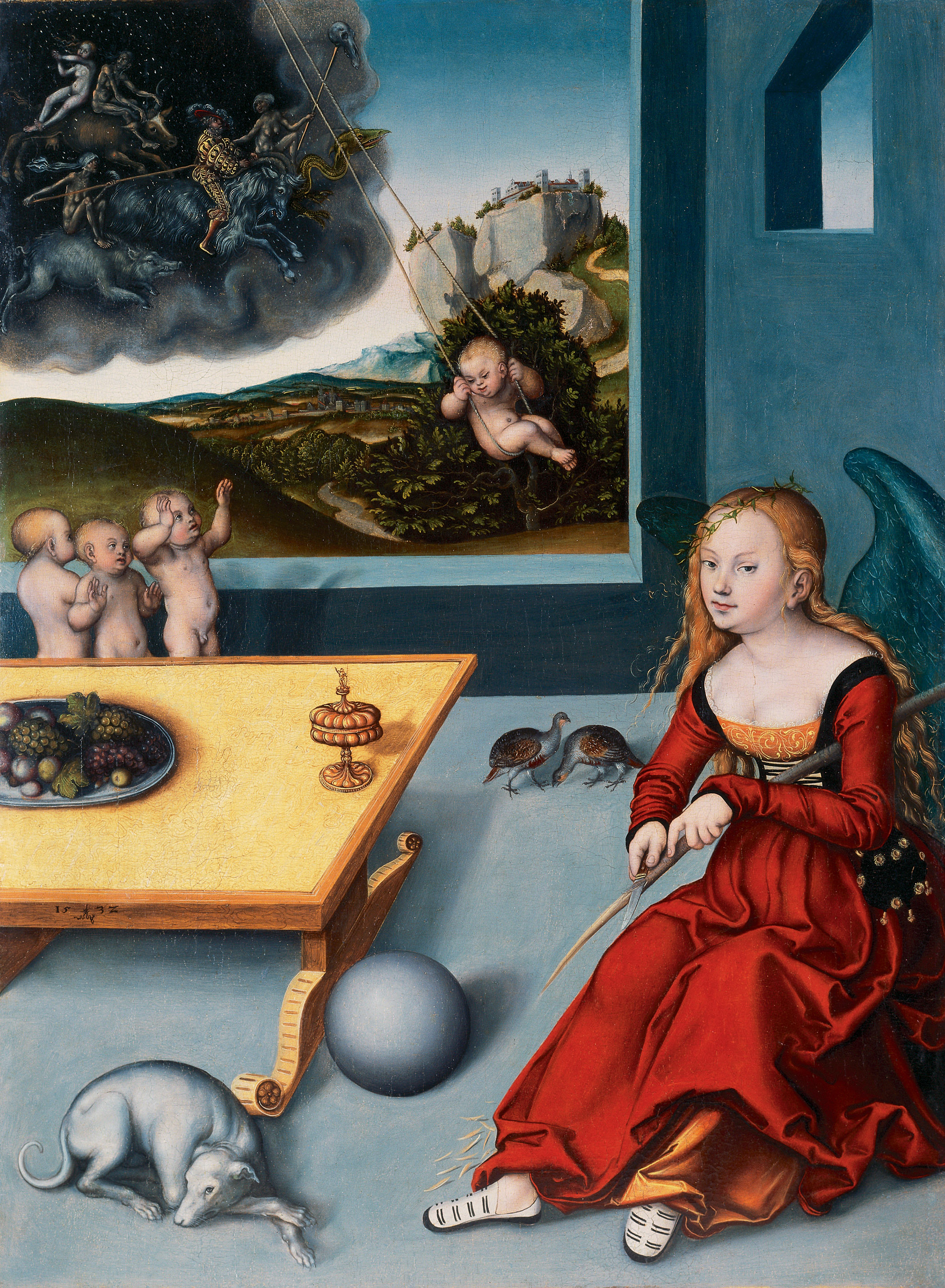
- Artist: Lucas Cranach the Elder
- Year: 1532
- Medium: oil paint on panel
- Movement: Northern Renaissance allegory
- Subject: Melancholia
- Dimensions: 76.5 cm × 56 cm (30.1 in × 22 in)
- Location: Unterlinden Museum, Colmar
- Accession: 1983

Melancholia is a 1532 oil painting by the German artist Lucas Cranach the Elder. It is now in the Unterlinden Museum in Colmar, France. Its inventory number is 83.5.1.

This vertical painting belongs to a series of four works inspired by Albrecht Dürer's seminal 1514 engraving Melencolia I. The National Gallery of Denmark in Copenhagen owns a horizontal version from the same year which presents a number of similarities. The Colmar version is accepted as a work largely painted by Lucas Cranach the Elder himself, but with a possible contribution of the 19-year-old Hans Cranach, which would account for the softness of the brushstrokes in some parts.
