= Sjernarøyane =

Island group in Rogaland, Norway

- Interactive map of the island

Geography
- Location: Rogaland, Norway
- Coordinates: 59.28037°N 5.79842°E
- Archipelago: Sjernarøyane

Administration
- Norway
- County: Rogaland
- Municipality: Stavanger Municipality

Demographics
- Population: 337 (2022)

Sjernarøyane is an island group in Stavanger Municipality in Rogaland county, Norway. The islands are located in the Nedstrandsfjorden, west of the large island of Ombo and north of the large island of Finnøy. As of 2014, the islands were home to 365 residents. The Aubøsund strait, which runs between the islands of Aubø and Bjergøy was a historically important trading post.

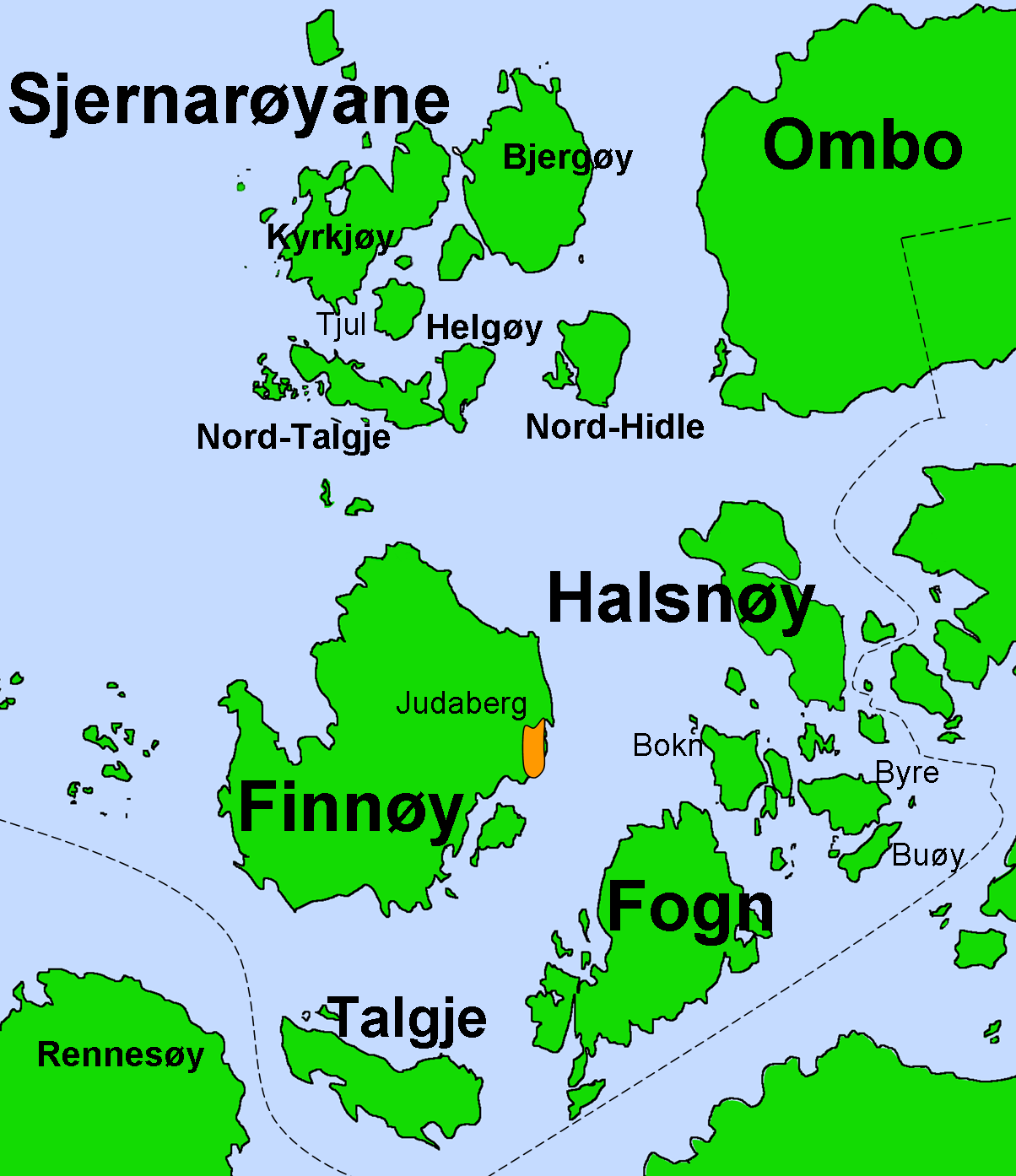
The Sjernarøyane islands are in the top part of this map

The name comes from Old Norse word "Sjǫrn" which means the number seven, since historically the archipelago had seven inhabited islands. Today the Sjernarøyane islands refer to the group of many small and larger islands. The inhabited islands today include Kyrkjøy, Bjergøy, Eriksholmen, Tjul, Nord-Hidle, Aubø, Helgøy, and Nord-Talgje. The uninhabited islands include Hestholmen, Finnborg, Lundarøynå, Norheimsøynå, Norheimslamholmen, Staup, Fiskholmane, as well as many other smaller islands. Sjernarøy Church is located on the main island of Kyrkjøy.

The island group is only accessible by boat, however all of the islands except for Nord-Hidle are connected to each other by a series of bridges. Nord-Hidle is not connected to any other islands. There are several regular ferry routes connecting the Sjernarøyane islands to the mainland as well as to other nearby islands.

== History ==
The islands were historically part of the old Nedstrand Municipality. In 1868, they became part of the new Sjernarøy Municipality. In 1965, the islands became part of Finnøy Municipality after a municipal merger. Then on 1 January 2020 the islands became part of the newly-enlarged Stavanger Municipality.

== See also ==
- List of islands of Norway
