= Jan Inge Sørbø =

Norwegian philologist, author and poet (born 1954)

Jan Inge Sørbø (born 16 September 1954) is a Norwegian philologist, author and poet.

He was born at Bru in Rennesøy Municipality in Rogaland, and took the cand.philol. degree in the history of literature at the University of Bergen in 1982. He debuted as a poet in 1986, and has also written novels. He has a background in the media, as journalist in Dagen from 1980 to 1987 and Stavanger Aftenblad from 1987 to 1989, and editor of Syn og Segn from 1993 to 1997. He was appointed professor at the Volda University College in 2001, and has been affiliated with the Ivar Aasen Centre.
