= Sjernarøy Church =

Church in Rogaland, Norway

- Sjernarøy kyrkje
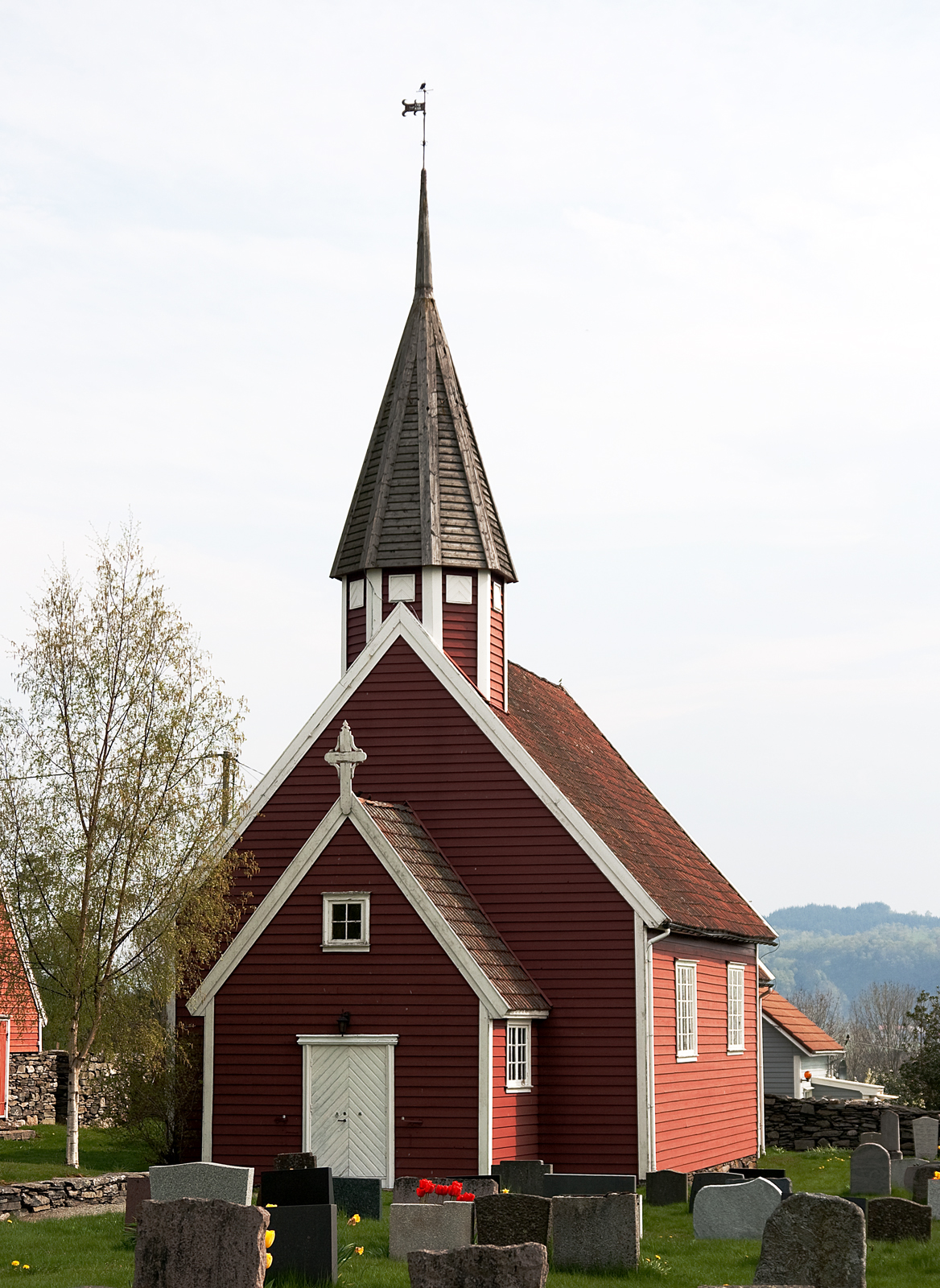
- View of the church
- Sjernarøy Church
- 59.253978°N 5.815389°E
- Location: Stavanger Municipality, Rogaland
- Country: Norway
- Denomination: Church of Norway
- Churchmanship: Evangelical Lutheran

History
- Status: Parish church
- Founded: 13th century
- Consecrated: 1647

Architecture
- Functional status: Active
- Architectural type: Long church
- Completed: 1647

Specifications
- Capacity: 160
- Materials: Wood

Administration
- Diocese: Stavanger bispedømme
- Deanery: Tungenes prosti
- Parish: Sjernarøy
- Norwegian Cultural Heritage Site
- Type: Church
- Status: Automatically protected
- ID: 85436

Sjernarøy Church (Norwegian: Sjernarøy kyrkje) is a parish church of the Church of Norway in the large Stavanger Municipality in Rogaland county, Norway. It is located on the island of Kyrkjøy in the Sjernarøyane islands. It is the church for the Sjernarøy parish which is part of the Tungenes prosti (deanery) in the Diocese of Stavanger. The red, wooden church was built in a long church design in 1647 using designs by an unknown architect. The church seats about 160 people. The interior walls of the church are decorated with hand-painted rosemåling.

== History ==
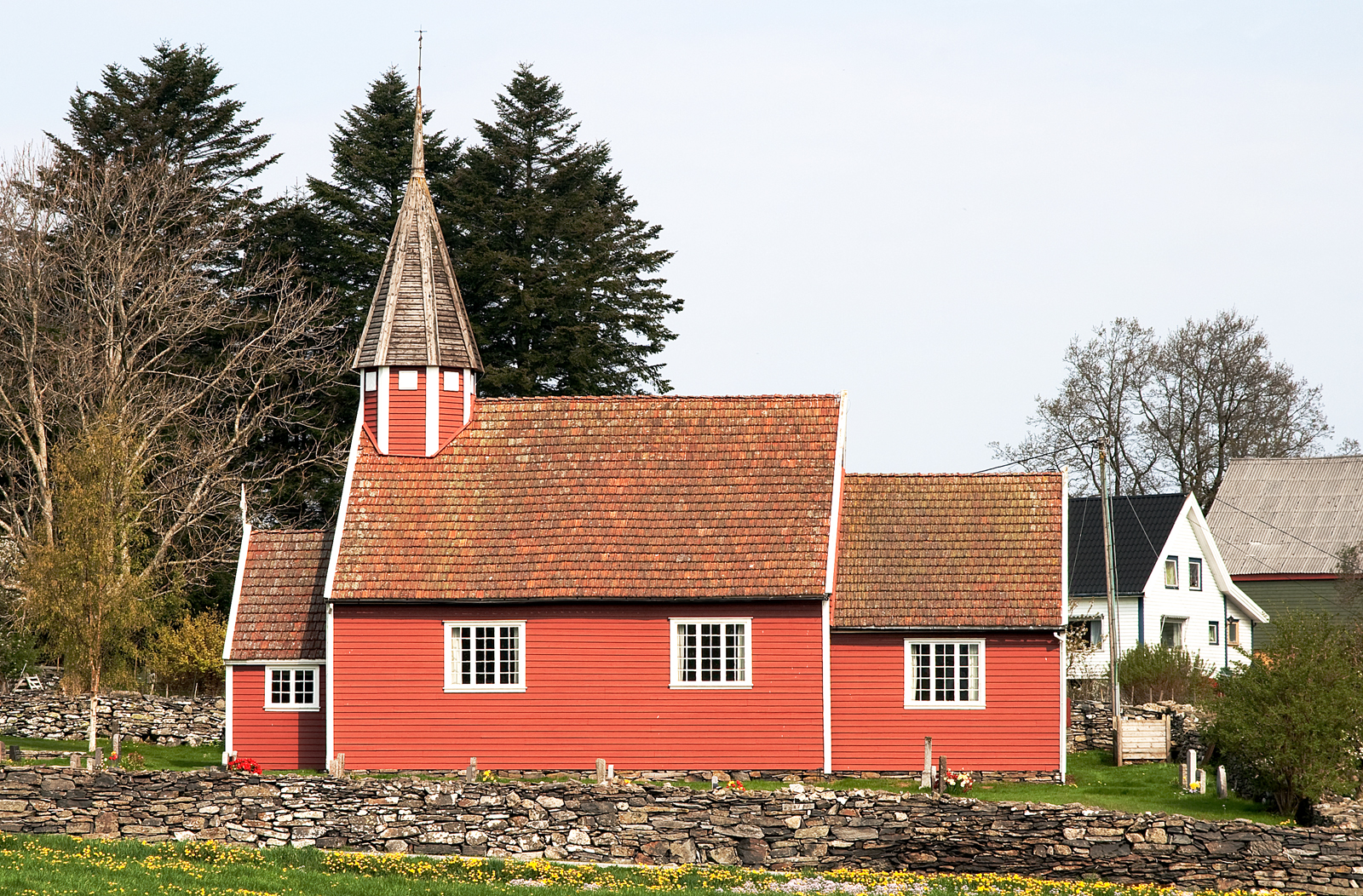
Side view of the church

The earliest existing historical records of the church date back to the year 1280, but the church was not new that year. In the late 1630s or early 1640s, the old stave church was torn down.

In 1647, a new timber-framed church was completed on the same site. The church has a rectangular nave and a smaller chancel with a lower roof line and narrower width. A small sacristy was built on the north side of the chancel and a small entry porch was located on the west end of the nave. In 1956, a tower was added on the roof.

== See also ==
- List of churches in Rogaland
