= Det Norske Samlaget =

Norwegian publishing house

Det Norske Samlaget is a Norwegian publishing house founded on 24 March 1868 with the aim to promote and publish books in Landsmål, now known as Nynorsk.

Det Norske Samlaget is now divided into two institutions: a literature organization, Litteraturselskapet Det Norske Samlaget, which is a culturally focused political-interest organization, and the publishing portion, Forlaget Det Norske Samlaget, which since 1978 has been a non-profit foundation and is responsible for publishing operations.

As a political organization, Litteraturselskapet Det Norske Samlaget works to promote the use of Nynorsk and the preparation and publication of books in Nynorsk. It is also responsible for several grants and awards such as the Nynorsk Literature Prize, the Melsom Prize (Melsom-prisen) established in 1922 through the endowment of shipowner Ferd. Melsom and the Blix Prize (Blixprisen) established through the Emma and Elias Blix Endowment.

Since 1978 the Forlaget Det Norske Samlaget has been an independent, separately operating nonprofit foundation. This publishing organization publishes the magazine Syn og Segn, books, historical, biographical and literary works, youth and children's books, textbooks, dictionaries, scientific and popular scientific books in Nynorsk.

== History ==
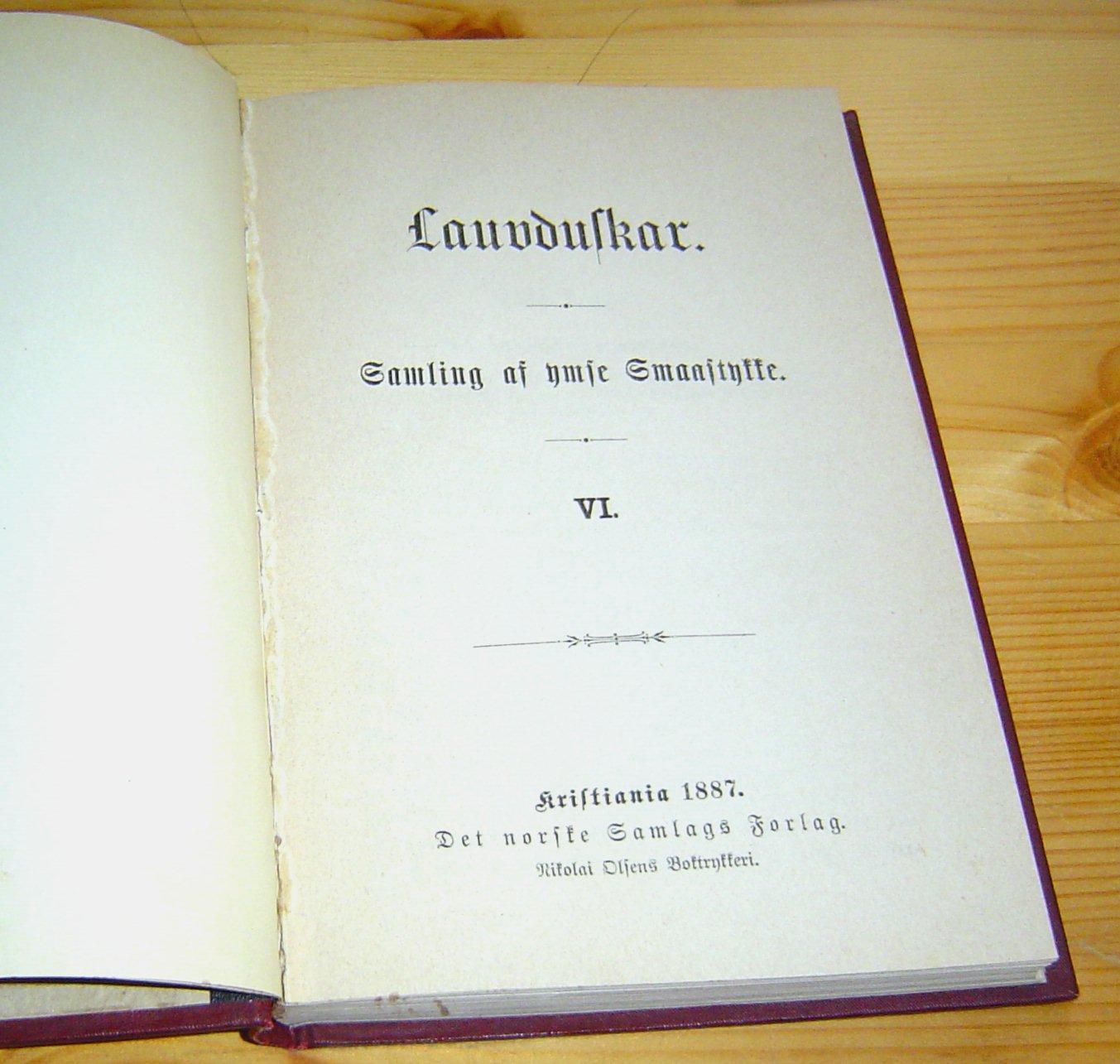
Title page of the book Lauvduskar VI, which was published by Det Norske Samlagets Forlag in 1887. It was set in the older Fraktur script

A small group of determined men came together in Christiania in 1868 and formed the Norwegian Samlaget. One of the founders and first chairman was Hagbard Emanuel Berner; he remained chairman until 1877. The formation of Norwegian Samlaget was a natural extension of the efforts to promote Landsmål as the predominant literary and official language of Norway. In 1929, Landsmål was renamed Nynorsk. This promotion of indigenous languages was a common movement over much of the Europe of that period. Iceland sponsored a form of Icelandic in opposition to the official Danish, Finns promoted use of Finnish in opposition to the official Swedish, Flemish was promoted in Belgium, Provençal in the south of France and Slavic dialects proliferated to the east. The debate about a Norwegian language reformation had been in progress for years, and fifteen years earlier Ivar Aasen had put forward the idea of reconstituting the Norwegian folk language. Although efforts had previously been made toward organization in the 1860s, it had been heavy work, and they met a great deal of resistance.
