= 2023 Nobel Prize in Literature =

Award

- Jon Fosse
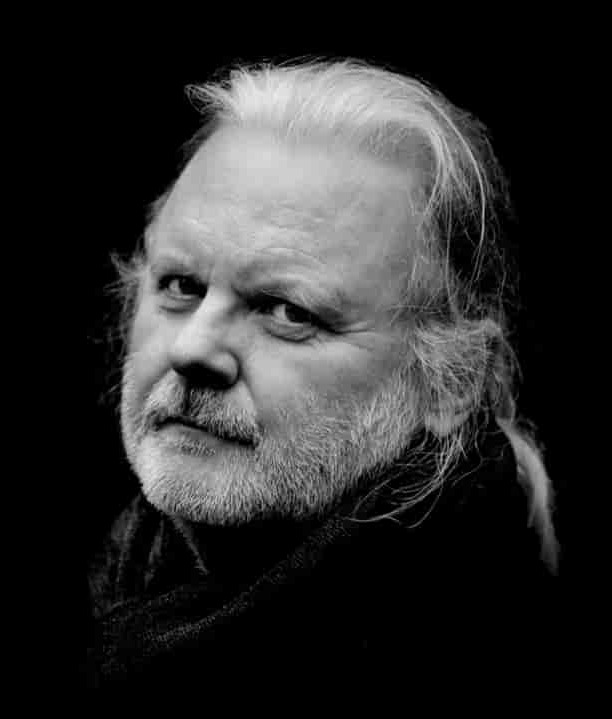
- "for his innovative plays and prose which give voice to the unsayable."
- Date: 5 October 2023 (announcement); 10 December 2023 (ceremony)
- Location: Stockholm, Sweden
- Presented by: Swedish Academy
- First award: 1901
- Website: Official website

The 2023 Nobel Prize in Literature was awarded to the Norwegian playwright and author Jon Fosse (born 1959) "for his innovative plays and prose which give voice to the unsayable". He is the fourth Norwegian recipient of the prize.

== Laureate ==
Jon Fosse was born in 1959 in Haugesund on the west coast of Norway. His bibliography includes plays, novels, poetry collections, essays, children's literature and translations.

Fosse's plays Namnet (1995; The Name, 2002), Natta syng sine songar (1998; Nightsongs, 2002), Draum om hausten (1999; Dream of Autumn, 2004), and Dødsvariasjonar (2002; Death Variations, 2004) explore the existential themes of human emotion, paradox, experience of divinity, and vulnerability with language and modernist artistic techniques. [Fosse] cites Vesaas, Beckett, Bernhard and Trakl as influences for his work. He is regarded as the most performed Norwegian playwright after Henrik Ibsen.

== Candidates ==
According to the site Nicer Odds, who compile odds from various betting sites, the favourites to be awarded the 2023 Nobel Prize in Literature were the Chinese author Can Xue and Jon Fosse. Other top betting favourites included Australian Gerald Murnane, Canadians Anne Carson and Margaret Atwood, Russian Lyudmila Ulitskaya, Kenyan Ngugi Wa Thiong’o, Romanian Mircea Cărtărescu, American Thomas Pynchon, Indian-born British-American Salman Rushdie, Japanese Haruki Murakami, Argentinian César Aira, Chilean Raúl Zurita, Korean Ko Un, French Michel Houellebecq and Pierre Michon, Antigua-American Jamaica Kincaid and French-Guadeloupe Maryse Condé.

== Prize announcement ==
Minutes after the prize announcement, Carin Klaesson interviewed Nobel Committee chairman Anders Olsson. Asked as to why Fosse was selected as the 2023 laureate in Literature, he explained:

"Jon Fosse is a fantastic author in many ways, and it is so strange with him as a writer because he touches you so deeply when you read him... What is special with him is that he has this special closeness, it touches on the deepest feelings that you have – anxieties, insecurities, questions of life and death – such things that every human being actually confronts from the very beginning. In that sense, I think he reaches very far and reaches a universal impact in everything that he writes, and it doesn't matter if it is drama, poetry or prose. It is the same kind of appeal to this basic humanness."

== Reactions ==
=== Personal reactions ===
"I am overwhelmed, and somewhat frightened. I see this as an award to the literature that first and foremost aims to be literature, without other considerations" was Fosse's first reaction. Fosse told NRK that he was "surprised but also not" to have won the prize "I've been part of the discussion for 10 years and have more and less tentatively prepared myself that this could happen".

Interviewed by Manisha Lalloo, a correspondent of the Nobel Prize's Outreach, Fosse expressed that he was greatly surprised when he won the prize even though he was used to being on the betting list speculations. Fosse was driving at the time on his way to Frekhaug, a village on Norway's west coast near the city of Bergen, when permanent secretary Mats Malm called him to inform he was this year's Nobel laureate. Malm told him that if he did not believe it he could watch the television and watch the announcement.

Asked as to how he spent his first day as a laureate, he responded:

"My Norwegian publisher has tried to organize a kind of system if this would happen. And so I went to meet the press, and a lot turned up and I didn't know how they knew it, so it took quite a while to do these interviews. And when I came back home, I had hundreds of emails. People are very kind to me they write beautiful stories about my writing to me and I am honestly happy for getting the prize so I tried to answer each and everyone about it. So it's an enormous response, I think, and it's difficult to cope with it, of course, to answer that many emails or messages. It takes quite a lot of time.

Fosse made mention of one particular reader, a Greek woman, who wrote a very touching email to him saying that his play Dødsvariasjonar (Death Variations) was "the reason she was still alive otherwise she would have already parted." He also gave advice to aspiring writers, saying:

"You must stick to yourself. You must listen to yourself, to your inner voice and not to others. When my first books were published and my first play was produced, the reviews were almost all of them really, really bad. I decided not to listen to it and that to listen to myself, to what I knew was good writing.

=== International reactions ===
Jon Fosse was one of the favourites to win the prize in 2023, and had been tipped to be awarded the Nobel Prize in Literature for the last ten years. The choice was generally well received. "He is an exceptional writer, who has managed to find a totally unique way of writing fiction", publisher Jacques Testard said. "A rather introverted and tricky writer," Swedish literary critic Per Wirtén commented on SVT, "...I think it's a great choice."

Egyptian-Sudanese novelist Tarek Eltayeb posted on Facebook about Fosse's victory, expressing his happiness "to get acquainted with a name worthy of attention." While jeering Fosse as a writer of "domestic literature", Iraqi writer Azher Jerjis also critiqued, saying

"Today a Norwegian playwright named Jon Fosse won. Have you heard of him? A handsome 60-year-old who writes simple, cold literature that does not touch upon constants and values. A peaceful writer who avoids criticising politics, and has nothing to do with the burning of the world around him.

King Harald V of Norway sent a personal message heartily congratulating Fosse for being awarded the Nobel Prize. Prime Minister Jonas Gahr Støre also wrote a message to Fosse on X (formerly Twitter): "A great recognition of outstanding authorship that makes an impression and touches people all over the world. All of Norway offers congratulations and is proud today!"

On 18 October 2023, Pope Francis sent a personal letter to Fosse, expressing salutations and his appreciation on his "ability to evoke Almighty God's gifts of grace, peace, and love in our often darkened world will surely enrich the lives of those who share the pilgrimage of faith." Concluding with the assurance of the Pope's prayers and a blessing, the Pope also added that Fosse's "gentle testimony of faith and committed literary voice will now reach a wide-ranging audience."

==== Catholic Church in Norway ====
Being a convert to Catholicism, Catholics in Norway celebrated Fosse's Nobel Prize, hoping the honor could bring a recognition to the Catholic faith in an entirely Protestant country. Bishop Bernt Ivar Eidsvig of Oslo said in a statement that honoring Fosse was the best news for Norway's Catholics, adding that he was pleased the writer, while not "seeing himself as an apologist," was "bearing witness to his faith." Bishop Erik Varden of Trondheim said

"A Catholic writer is someone who assimilated the grace of belonging to the church in such a way that it's perfectly innate and natural to their self-expression. In that sense, Fosse is very much a Catholic writer. [He] gives voice, with elegance and beauty, to the mystery of faith — having read him with reverence for years, I think our country is blessed to have a poet of his stature.

"It may encourage more Catholics to read great literature — inducing some [of] them to make creative contributions to the public forum in ways which make Christian hope seem apparent and credible... We must wait and see if this award has an evangelical impact and brings more people to the church. But to read Fosse is to grow in self-knowledge and learn to observe the lives of others with an intelligent tenderness."

Norwegian Academy president, Nils Kristian Heyerdahl, also a Catholic convert, said Fosse has been a well established writer before becoming a Catholic, but had always included a religious dimension in his work – "not in the form of intrusive opinions, but as a mysterious presence in the language." Gregory Wolfe, publisher and editor of Slant Books, commented of Fosse's victory, saying:

"Jon Fosse is a highly deserving Nobel laureate in literature. While he has been a widely produced playwright, his renown has spread in recent years through his fiction, including the masterful Septology. While his style may not be to everyone's taste, it is not because he is intellectual or political. In fact, Fosse's prose has been compared to liturgy: it uses a lot of simple words and images and repetition to evoke memory, longing, and a spiritual search. And indeed as a convert to the Catholic Church he includes prayer directly into stories. Readers willing to accept the brief 'learning curve' of adjusting to his narrative style will be well rewarded by a writer of an almost mystical sensibility."

Fosse became the second Norwegian Catholic author to win the Nobel Prize after Sigrid Undset in 1928.

== Nobel lecture ==
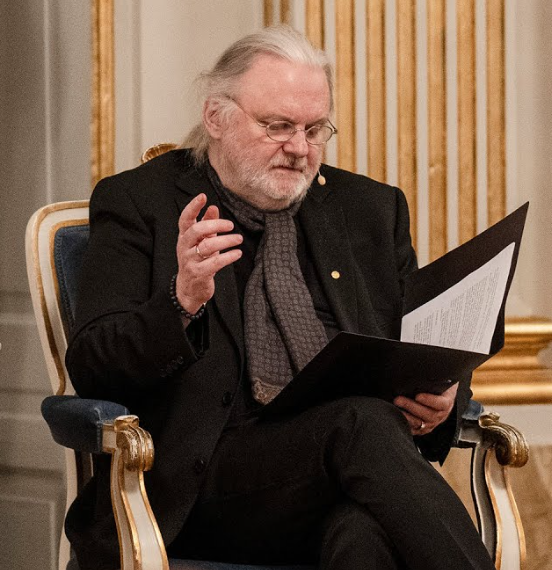
Fosse giving his Nobel lecture entitled The Silent Language on 7 December 2023.

Jon Fosse delivered his Nobel lecture on 7 December 2023 at the Swedish Academy. Entitled The Silent Language, he spoke about the difference between spoken language and written language and the use and effect of silence in his works.

== Award ceremony speech ==
At the award ceremony in Stockholm on 10 December, Anders Olsson, chair of the Swedish Academy's Nobel committee said:

To enter the world of Jon Fosse is to set foot in a domain beset by the greatest anxiety and torment of indecision. His rich oeuvre revolves around the disorientation of the individual and the difficulties experienced in finding a path in life. Whether in prose, drama or poetry, his writing approaches a state of uncertainty that can open a relation to the divine. With commonplace words here seeming inadequate, Fosse's rare quality is that he succeeds, as the award citation reads, in ‘giving voice to the unsayable'. (...)

Jon Fosse is not a difficult writer. He uses the simplest of words and writes about experiences to which we can all relate: separation, death and the vulnerability of love. Any difficulty with Fosse rather concerns our readiness to open ourselves to the existential uncertainty upon which he constantly touches. But the fact that he is one of today's most widely performed playwrights indicates that this is a torment shared by many.

What is remarkable about Fosse's simplicity is that it gains depth and intensity through repetition and variation. (...) In Septology, the rolling prose devoid of sentence breaks becomes one with the painter Asle's wandering thoughts, drawing in the reader with hypnotic power.

== Nobel Committee ==
The Swedish Academy's 2023 Nobel Committee is composed of the following members:

Committee Members
Seat No.	Picture	Name	Elected	Position	Profession
4		Anders Olsson (b. 1949)	2008	committee chair	literary critic, literary historian
11		Mats Malm (b. 1964)	2018	associate member permanent secretary	translator, literary historian, editor
12		Per Wästberg (b. 1933)	1997	member	novelist, journalist, poet, essayist
13		Anne Swärd (b. 1969)	2019	member	novelist
9		Ellen Mattson (b. 1963)	2019	member	novelist, essayist
14		Steve Sem-Sandberg (b. 1958)	2021	member	journalist, author, translator
