= Rise of the Nazis =

BBC documentary

- Genre: Documentary
- Narrated by: Kate Fleetwood
- Composer: Tom Hodge
- Country of origin: United Kingdom
- Original language: English
- No. of seasons: 4
- No. of episodes: 12

Production
- Production companies: 72 Films; Baltic Film Services

Original release
- Network: BBC Two
- Release: 2 September 2019 – 3 October 2023

Rise of the Nazis is a British documentary series about the rise and fall of Adolf Hitler and the Nazi Party. The first series aired in 2019, followed by the second and third series in 2022, and the fourth and final series in 2023. Several historians and military experts give their perspective on the events. The first series covers Adolf Hitler's rise to power; the second the Eastern Front during the Second World War; the third the end of the war and downfall of the Nazis; and the final series the Nuremberg trials and the hunt for war criminals in later years.

== Episodes ==
=== Series overview ===
Series	Title	Episodes	Originally released	
Series	Title	Episodes	First released	Last released
1	Origins	3	2 September 2019	16 September 2019
2	Dictators at War	3	14 February 2022	28 February 2022
3	The Downfall	3	10 October 2022	24 October 2022
4	The Manhunt	3	19 September 2023	3 October 2023

=== Series 1: Origins (2019) ===
No. overall	No. in series	Title	Directed by	Original release date
1	1	"Politics"	Julian Jones	2 September 2019
The path to Hitler becoming Chancellor of Germany in January 1933.
2	2	"The First Six Months in Power"	Julian Jones	9 September 2019
How the Nazis removed the political opposition and other democratic institutions during their early months in government.
3	3	"Night of the Long Knives"	Julian Jones	16 September 2019
How Hitler tightened his grip on power in 1934, and the lead-up to the Night of the Long Knives.

=== Series 2: Dictators at War (2021) ===
No. overall	No. in series	Title	Directed by	Original release date
4	1	"Barbarossa"	Julian Jones	14 February 2022
The events that led to Hitler ordering the launch of the German invasion of the Soviet Union.
5	2	"Stalingrad"	Julian Jones	21 February 2022
After the Nazis lost in Moscow, both dictators took charge of their armies. Discusses the Battle of Stalingrad.
6	3	"The Home Front"	Julian Jones	28 February 2022
A fresh perspective on how Hitler seized and kept power, and the missed chances to stop him.

=== Series 3: The Downfall (2022) ===
No. overall	No. in series	Title	Directed by	Original release date
7	1	"Who Will Betray Him?"	Alice Smith	10 October 2022
By early 1945, Germany is surrounded by the Western Allies and Russian forces. Despite imminent defeat, and many peace overtures made from the German side to the Allies, Hitler refuses to surrender unconditionally. Meanwhile, senior figures in Hitler's inner circle plan for the future after the war ends.
8	2	"Hitler's Birthday"	Alice Smith	17 October 2022
By April 1945, Russian forces have completely encircled Berlin — Hitler issues an order to fight to the death. The majority of Hitler's inner circle grow increasingly disillusioned with the Führer's refusal to surrender.
9	3	"Into the Abyss"	Alice Smith	24 October 2022
With the Nazi regime disintegrating all around him, Hitler finally realises the war is lost and commits suicide. In Hitler's last testament, Karl Dönitz is named Reichskanzler (Chancellor), much to the chagrin of Himmler and Göring. The Allies round up Nazis and prosecute them at the Nuremberg trials.

=== Series 4: The Manhunt (2023) ===
No. overall	No. in series	Title	Directed by	Original release date
10	1	"Most Wanted"	Alice Smith & Izzy Charman	19 September 2023
Dealing with the aftermath of the German surrender — bringing Nazi crimes to justice at the Nuremberg trials and tracking down the high-ranking Nazis still at large.
11	2	"The Ratline"	Alice Smith & Izzy Charman	26 September 2023
In the face of an escalating Cold War, attention is turned to combating communism and many Nazis return to normal lives or flee overseas.
12	3	"The Reckoning"	Alice Smith & Izzy Charman	3 October 2023
A new generation is unable to tolerate the integration of former Nazis into normal life — the hunt for Nazi criminals continues into the 1960s and 70s.

== Contributors ==
In the series, historians and other experts are interviewed, each representing particular people. The experts are listed in order of appearance.

- Dr. Stephan Malinowski - Kurt von Schleicher (Series 1)
- General Sir Mike Jackson - Paul von Hindenburg (Series 1), General Georgy Zhukov (Series 2), and Captain Victor Cross (Series 4)
- Prof. Sir Richard Evans - Adolf Hitler (Series 1-3)
- Baroness Helena Kennedy QC - Hans Litten (Series 1)
- Giles MacDonogh - Franz von Papen (Series 1)
- Prof. Richard Overy - Hermann Göring (Series 1-4)
- Ash Sarkar - Ernst Thälmann (Series 1)
- Dr. Heike B. Görtemaker - Ernst Röhm (Series 1) and Albert Speer (Series 2-4)
- Dr. Christian Goeschel - Heinrich Himmler (Series 1-3), Rudolf Höss (Series 4) and Adolf Eichmann (Series 4)
- Dr. Timothy W. Ryback - Josef Hartinger (Series 1)
- Clare Mulley - Edgar Jung (Series 1) and Eva Braun (Series 3)
- Garry Kasparov - Joseph Stalin (Series 2)
- Sir John Scarlett - Vyacheslav Molotov (Series 2)
- Prof. Alexandra Richie - Walther von Brauchitsch (Series 2)
- Anne Nelson - Harro and Libertas Schulze-Boysen (Series 2)
- Sir Antony Beevor - Friedrich Paulus (Series 2)
- Dr. Pablo de Orellana - Joseph Goebbels (Series 2-3) and Magda Goebbels (Series 3)
- Afua Hirsch - Sophie Scholl (Series 2)
- James Bulgin - Claus von Stauffenberg (Series 2)
- Prof. Hannah Elsisi - Helene Podliasky (Series 3)
- Daniel Levin - Norbert Masur (Series 3)
- Omar Mohammed - Robert Limpert (Series 3)
- Dr. Gwen Adshead - Gustave Gilbert (Series 4)
- Lindsay Moran - Robert Taylor (Series 4)
- Prof. Gerald Steinacher - Klaus Barbie (Series 4)
- Dr. Ronen Steinke - Fritz Bauer (Series 4)
- Avner Avraham - Isser Harel (Series 4)
- Gerald Posner - Josef and Rolf Mengele (Series 4)
- Melanie Levensohn - Beate Klarsfeld (Series 4)

== Response ==
A review of the first series in The Times described the first series as a lesson in 'how easily — and petrifyingly quickly — a democratic country can move to a totalitarian dictatorship.' A TV Insider review of the American release on PBS a little over a year later described the series as "riveting" and "as gripping as any fictional thriller." A more critical review by James Delingpole in the conservative publication The Spectator suggested that the first series made inappropriate comparisons to political developments at around the time of its production, such as Brexit and the presidency of Donald Trump, concluding that "it's time the BBC gave up trying to pretend it's a voice of impartial authority".

A short review in The Guardian said of the second series that "bringing something new to TV coverage of the second world war is no mean feat, but this narratively gripping take on the eastern front comes very close." A more detailed review in The Telegraph was complimentary of the series summarising it as "television that is informative, intelligent and surprising – if only there was more of this on BBC Two."
