= Kippenberger =

- Language: German

Origin
- Region of origin: Germany

Kippenberger is a German surname. Notable people with the surname include:

- Christopher Kippenberger (born 1977), German/American filmmaker/artist
- Hans Kippenberger (1898–1937), German politician
- Howard Kippenberger (1897–1957), New Zealand soldier
- Karl Kippenberger (born 1973), New Zealand bass guitarist of the band Shihad
- Martin Kippenberger (1953–1997), German artist
- Susanne Kippenberger (born 1957), German journalists and writer
