= Hannah Arendt (film) =

2012 film by Margarethe von Trotta

- Theatrical release poster
- Directed by: Margarethe von Trotta
- Written by: Margarethe von Trotta; Pamela Katz
- Produced by: Bettina Brokemper
- Starring: Barbara Sukowa; Janet McTeer; Klaus Pohl; Nicholas Woodeson; Axel Milberg
- Cinematography: Caroline Champetier
- Edited by: Bettina Böhler
- Music by: André Mergenthaler
- Production companies: Heimatfilm; Bayerischer Rundfunk; Westdeutscher Rundfunk
- Distributed by: NFP Marketing & Distribution (Germany); Sophie Dulac Distribution (France)
- Release dates: 11 September 2012 (TIFF); 10 January 2013 (Germany)
- Running time: 113 minutes
- Countries: Germany; Luxembourg; France
- Languages: German; English; French; Hebrew; Latin
- Box office: $7.3 million

Hannah Arendt is a 2012 biographical drama film directed by Margarethe von Trotta and starring Barbara Sukowa. An international co-production from Germany, Luxembourg and France, the film centers on the life of German-Jewish philosopher and political theorist Hannah Arendt. The film, distributed by Zeitgeist Films in the United States, opened theatrically on 29 May 2013.

German director von Trotta's film centers on Arendt's response to the 1961 trial of Nazi Adolf Eichmann, which she covered for The New Yorker. Her articles in The New Yorker were published in 1963 as the book Eichmann in Jerusalem: A Report on the Banality of Evil. Her writing on the trial became controversial for its depiction of both Eichmann and the Jewish councils, and for its introduction of Arendt's now-famous concept of "the banality of evil".

== Synopsis ==
As the film opens Eichmann has been captured in Argentina. It is revealed that he escaped there via the "rat line" and with forged papers. Arendt, now a professor in New York, volunteers to write about the trial for The New Yorker and is given the assignment. Observing the trial, she is impressed by how ordinary and mediocre Eichmann appears. She had expected someone scary, a monster, and he does not seem to be that. In a cafe conversation in which the Faust story is raised it is mentioned that Eichmann is not in any way a Mephisto (the devil). Returning to New York, Arendt has massive piles of transcripts to go through. Her husband has a brain aneurysm, almost dying, and causing her further delay. She continues to struggle with how Eichmann rationalized his behavior through platitudes about bureaucratic loyalty, and that he was just doing his job. When her material is finally published, it immediately creates enormous controversy, resulting in angry phone calls and a falling out with her old friend, Hans Jonas.

In a night out on the town with her friend, novelist Mary McCarthy, she insists that she is being misunderstood, and her critics who accuse her of "defending" Eichmann have not read her work. McCarthy broaches the subject of Arendt's love relationship many years ago with philosopher Martin Heidegger, who had collaborated with the Nazis. Arendt finds herself shunned by many colleagues and former friends. The film closes with a final speech she gives before a group of students, in which she says this trial was about a new type of crime that had not previously existed. A court had to define Eichmann as a man on trial for his deeds. It was not a system or an ideology that was on trial, only a man. But Eichmann was a man who renounced all qualities of personhood, thus showing that great evil is committed by "nobodies" without motives or intentions other than to follow orders unquestioningly, without thinking. This is what she calls "the banality of evil".

The film, which captures Arendt at one of the pivotal moments of her life and career, also features portrayals of other prominent intellectuals, including philosopher Martin Heidegger, novelist Mary McCarthy, and The New Yorker editor William Shawn.

== Cast ==
- Barbara Sukowa as Hannah Arendt
  - Friederike Becht as young Hannah
- Janet McTeer as Mary McCarthy
- Klaus Pohl as Martin Heidegger
- Nicholas Woodeson as William Shawn
- Axel Milberg as Heinrich Blücher
- Julia Jentsch as Lotte Köhler
- Ulrich Noethen as Hans Jonas
- Michael Degen as Kurt Blumenfeld (the character portraying a mix of real Kurt Blumenfeld and Gershom Scholem)
- Victoria Trauttmansdorff as Charlotte Beradt
- Harvey Friedman as Thomas Miller
- Megan Gay as Francis Wells
- Claire Johnson as Mrs. Serkin
- Gilbert Johnston as Professor Kahn
- Tom Leik as Jonathan Schell
- Adolf Eichmann as himself (on the trial footage)

== Awards ==
- 2012: Toronto International Film Festival Official Selection
- 2012: New York Jewish Film Festival Official Selection
- 2013: Lola Award for Best Actress for Barbara Sukowa and Silver Lola for Best Film, Deutscher Filmpreis
- 2013: Guild Film Award-Gold from the Guild of German Art House Cinemas
- 2013: Audience Award for Best Narrative Film, Women + Film Voices Film Festival, Denver
- 2013: Best Actress for Barbara Sukowa, Bavarian Film Awards
- 2013: Best Actress nomination for Barbara Sukowa, European Film Awards

== Production ==
Hannah Arendt makes use of original film footage from the 1961 Eichmann trial, in black & white, as well as the real testimony of survivors and the prosecutor, Gideon Hausner.

== Critical response ==
Hannah Arendt received mostly positive reviews from critics. On Rotten Tomatoes it has an approval rating of 88% based on reviews from 66 critics, with an average rating of 6.8/10. The site's consensus reads: "Led by a powerful performance from Barbara Sukowa, Hannah Arendt does a commendable job of dramatizing the life of a complex public figure." On Metacritic, the film has a score of 69%, based on 17 critics, indicating "generally favorable" reviews.

A.O. Scott of The New York Times wrote: "Hannah Arendt conveys the glamour, charisma and difficulty of a certain kind of German thought. Ms. Sukowa, compact and energetic and not overly concerned with impersonation, captures Arendt's fearsome cerebral power, as well as her warmth and, above all, the essential, unappeasable curiosity that drove her.... Its climax, in which Arendt defends herself against critics, matches some of the great courtroom scenes in cinema and provides a stirring reminder that the labor of figuring out the world is necessary, difficult and sometimes genuinely heroic."

Roger Berkowitz of The Paris Review wrote: "To make a film about a thinker is a challenge; to do so in a way that is accessible and gripping is a triumph. Hannah Arendt herself might have been surprised to learn that after fifty years of deadening controversy, it is a film that promises to provoke the serious public debate she sought in publishing her book."
