= Marc Wilson (photographer) =

British photographer

Marc Wilson (born 1968) is a British photographer, living in Bath. His books include The Last Stand (2014) and A Wounded Landscape (2021).

== Early life and education ==
Wilson was born in London. He gained a BSc in sociology from the University of Edinburgh (1992), and a BA (1996) and MA (1999) in photography from London College of Printing.

== Life and work ==
Wilson lives in Bath, Somerset and works as a professional photographer.

The Last Stand, made between 2010 and 2014, documents "the physical traces of the second world war on the coastlines of the British Isles and northern Europe". The work shows "how military ruins have become embedded into the landscape, yet still serve as relics of historic events".

A Wounded Landscape is "a project which has taken him six years, with travel to 130 locations in 20 countries. It tells the stories of 22 individuals, some survivors, some who perished in the Holocaust, whose experiences are relayed by surviving members of their family."

== Publications ==
- The Last Stand: Northern Europe. UK: Triplekite, 2014. ISBN 978-0957634558.
  - Second edition. 2015.
  - Third edition. Expanded, redesigned and revised format. Self-published, 2020. ISBN 978-1-8380236-0-7. With an essay by Eliane Wilson, and a foreword by Rox Exley.
- Travelogue 1 – Photographs from Eastern Europe 2015–2020. Self-published. ISBN 978-1-8380236-1-4.
- A Wounded Landscape – bearing witness to the Holocaust. Self-published, 2021. With a foreword by James Bulgin. Photographs, 22 story texts, captions and maps.
- Remnants. two&two, 2022. ISBN 978-1-8380236-3-8. With an essay by Marco Ferrari and illustrations by Jane Randfield. Edition of 1000 copies.

== Solo exhibitions ==
- The Last Stand, Royal Armouries, Fort Nelson, Hampshire, 2013; Royal Armouries Museum, Leeds, 2013/14
- A Wounded Landscape by Marc Wilson, Side Gallery, Newcastle

== Awards ==
- 2013: Shortlisted, Terry O'Neill Award 2012, for The Last Stand
