= Damion Searls =

American writer and translator

Damion Searls is an American writer and translator. He grew up in New York and studied at Harvard University and the University of California, Berkeley. He translates literary works from German, Norwegian, French, Dutch, and Faroese. Among the authors he has translated are Marcel Proust, Thomas Mann, Rainer Maria Rilke, Robert Walser, Ingeborg Bachmann, Hermann Hesse, Kurt Schwitters, Peter Handke, Jon Fosse, Heike B. Görtemaker, Ludwig Wittgenstein, Max Weber, and Nescio. He has received numerous grants and fellowships for his translations. In 2026, Granta reported that Searls is co-translating Jens Pauli Heinesen's The Driftwood Man from Faroese.

Searls published The Inkblots, the first English-language biography of Hermann Rorschach, inventor of the Rorschach test, in 2017. He won the Helen and Kurt Wolff Translator's Prize in 2019 for Uwe Johnson's Anniversaries: From a Year in the Life of Gesine Cresspahl.

In April 2022, Searls's English translation of Jon Fosse's novel A New Name: Septology VI–VII was shortlisted for the International Booker Prize.

Explaining his philosophy of translation, Searls writes, "We don't translate words of a language, we translate uses of language.... In a translation, even what look like divergences or outright mistakes on the single-word level may well be part of what you need to do to re-create the same force in English."

As of 2022, Searls lived in Minneapolis, Minnesota.

== Selected works ==
=== Author ===
- Everything You Say Is True: A Travelogue (2003)
- what we were doing and where we were going (2009) (five stories)
- The Inkblots: Hermann Rorschach, His Iconic Test, and the Power of Seeing (2017)
- The Philosophy of Translation (2024) review
- Analog Days (2025) (a novella)
- The Mariner's Mirror (2025) (poems)

=== Translator/editor ===
- Clemens Berger, Angel of the Poor, a comedy (a play)
- Dubravka Ugrešić, Thank You for Not Reading (co-translated with the author and Celia Hawkesworth
- Dubravka Ugrešić, Lend Me Your Character (co-translated with the author and Celia Hawkesworth and Michael Henry Heim)
- Elfriede Jelinek, Her Not All Her (winner of the 2011 Austrian Cultural Foundation NY Translation Award)
- Hans Keilson, Comedy in a Minor Key (National Book Critics Circle Award finalist; The New York Times Notable Book of 2010; Salon.com Best Book of the Year; winner of the 2011 Schlegel-Tieck Translation Prize)
- Hans Keilson, Life Goes On
- Heike B. Görtemaker, Eva Braun: Life with Hitler (Vintage Books, New York 2011)
- Henry David Thoreau, The Journal: 1837-1861 (NYRB Classics)
- Hermann Hesse, Demian (Penguin Classics)
- Ingeborg Bachmann, Letters to Felician
- Jon Fosse, Aliss at the Fire (PEN Center USA Translation Award)
- Jon Fosse, Melancholy I-II (co-translated with Grethe Kvernes)
- Jon Fosse, Septology, Volumes 1-7
- Jon Fosse, Morning and Evening
- Marcel Proust and John Ruskin, On Reading
- Mirjam Pressler with Gerti Elias, Anne Frank's Family: The Extraordinary Story of Where She Came From
- Rainer Maria Rilke, The Inner Sky: Poems, Notes, Dreams, a bilingual anthology that includes Notes on the Melody of Things (David R. Godine, 2010)
- Nescio, Amsterdam Stories (NYRB Classics, 2012; winner of awards from PEN Translation Fund, the Netherland America Foundation, and the Dutch Literature Fund)
- Susanne Kippenberger, Kippenberger: The Artist and His Families (J&L Books, 2012)
- Christa Wolf, City of Angels or, The Overcoat of Dr. Freud (Farrar, Straus and Giroux, 2013)
- Robert Walser, A Schoolboy's Diary and Other Stories (NYRB Classics, 2013)
- Alfred Döblin, Bright Magic: Stories (New York Review Books, 2016)
- Jon Fosse, Scenes from a Childhood (Fitzcaraldo, 2017) (stories)
- Uwe Johnson, A Trip to Klagenfurt: In the Footsteps of Ingeborg Bachmann with Youth in an Austrian Town by Ingeborg Bachmann
- Uwe Johnson, Island Stories: Writings from England
- Uwe Johnson, Anniversaries: From a Year in the Life of Gesine Cresspahl (NYRB Classics, 2018)
- Max Weber, Charisma and Disenchantment: The Vocation Lectures (New York Review Books, 2020)
- Rainer Maria Rilke, Letters to a Young Poet: With the Letters to Rilke from the "Young Poet" (Liveright, 2020)
- André Gide, Marshlands (New York Review Books, 2021)
- Saša Stanišić, Where You Come From (Portland, Oregon: Tin House, 2021) read online
- Hermann Hesse, Trees: An Anthology of Writings and Paintings (Kales Press, 2022)
- Felix Salten, Bambi: or, life in the forest. (NYRB Classics, 2022)
- Victoria Kielland, My Men (Astra House, 2023)
- Thomas Mann, New Selected Stories (Liveright, 2023)
- Jon Fosse, A Shining (Transit Books / Fitzcarraldo, 2023)
- Jon Fosse, A Silent Language: The Nobel Lecture (Transit Books / Fitzcarraldo, 2024)
- Ariane Koch, Overstaying (St. Louis: Dorothy, a publishing project, 2024) (Pushkin Press, 2024)
- Ludwig Wittgenstein, Tractatus Logico-Philosophicus: A New Translation, with an introduction by Marjorie Perloff (New York: Liveright, 2024, ISBN 978-1324092438. Review by A. W. Moore)
- Charlotte Beradt, The Third Reich of Dreams: The Nightmares of a Nation (Princeton University Press, 2025). Review by Zadie Smith. Review by Sofia Cumming. Review by Benjamin Balint
- Jon Fosse, Vaim (Transit Books / Fitzcarraldo, 2025)
- Jon Fosse, Vaim Hotel (Transit Books / Fitzcarraldo, 2026)
