= Anniversaries. From the Life of Gesine Cresspahl =

Tetralogy of novels by Uwe Johnson

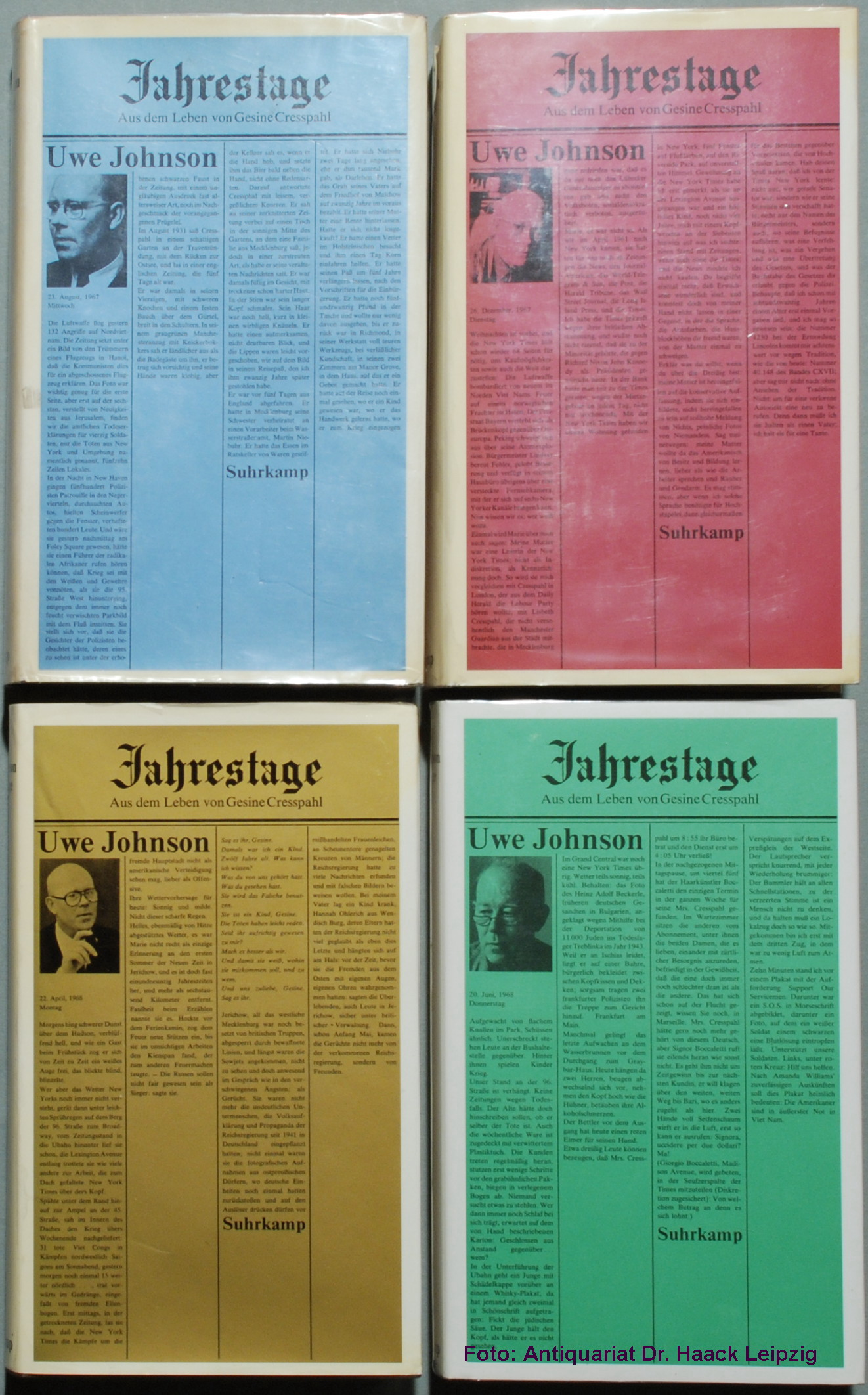
- 4
- Author: Uwe Johnson
- Original title: Jahrestage 1-4: Aus dem Leben von Gesine Cresspahl
- Language: German
- Published: 1970–83

Anniversaries: From a Year in the Life of Gesine Cresspahl (German: Jahrestage. Aus dem Leben von Gesine Cresspahl) is a tetralogy of novels by Uwe Johnson begun in 1970, with further volumes published in 1971, 1973, and finally in 1983. The main character, Gesine Cresspahl, is a German single mother in Manhattan, and we follow her life from childhood in 1930s rural Eastern Germany at the time of the rise of Nazism, through World War II, the Soviet occupation zone, the establishment of the GDR, and beginning of the Cold War, followed by her exile to New York. Eventually, she decides to return to Europe, and leaves for Prague, unaware that Soviet tanks have occupied the city and put down the Prague Spring. The novel has 367 short sections, one for each day of the year, from 21 August 1967 to 21 August 1968 (a leap year) plus a prelude section in the first volume and an appendix to the second, though it bears very little resemblance to a series of diary entries. The narrative moves between past and present, and often shifts rapidly from first- to third-person. Most sections incorporate news reports, as Gesine reads them in the New York Times each day on the subway.

== Translations ==
An abridged translation by Leila Vennewitz (Volumes 1–3) and Walter Arndt (Volume 4) was published across two books in 1975 and 1987, with about 30 percent missing. A full translation by Damion Searls was published by New York Review Books in 2018 as a two-volume single novel.

== Reception ==
The 2018 translation by Damion Searls was met with much critical acclaim though most reviews noted the sheer length of the work made it a challenging read. Jonathan Steinberg reviewing for The Spectator called the novel "an astonishing achievement". Anthony Cummins writing in The Guardian praised it as a "monumental work" and also suggested it might be "the novel of the year." The Atlantic praised it as a "novel of vaulting formal ambition". Parul Sehgal reviewing for The New York Times was more lukewarm on the novel calling it "painstaking".
