= Septology =

Novel by Jon Fosse

- Author: Jon Fosse
- Original title: Septologien
- Translator: Damion Searls
- Language: Norwegian
- Genre: Literary fiction
- Publisher: Fitzcarraldo Editions (English)
- Publication date: 2019–2021
- Publication place: Norway
- English publication date: 2019–2021
- Pages: 1,250 (combined)
- ISBN: 978-1-913-09715-8

Septology (Norwegian: Septologien) is a seven-part novel by Norwegian author Jon Fosse, published in three volumes between 2019 and 2021.

The novel is written as a single stream-of-consciousness sentence. It has been described as Fosse's masterpiece, "arguably Fosse's magnum opus", and "the culminating project of an already major career".

== Plot ==
Septology describes the last seven days of the life of its narrator, Asle, a widowed painter who lives in a coastal village in Norway. At home, Asle converses with his neighbor, the fisherman Asleik. Visiting the city of Bjørgvin (a stand-in for Bergen), Asle rescues an alcoholic friend, also a painter named Asle, who has blacked out in the snow. Eventually, the narrator travels by boat with Asleik to Asleik's sister's house, dying there before Christmas dinner.

Each part of the novel describes a separate day, beginning with Asle's contemplation of a painting he is making of St. Andrew's Cross, and ending with a prayer (Asle, like Fosse, is a Catholic convert). Much of the novel is taken up with Asle's memories. In some cases the line between reality and memory or apparition may be blurred, as with the lovers Asle sees who may be younger versions of himself and his wife Ales, the possible ex-lover he encounters who shares a name with Asleik's sister, and the duplication of the Asles themselves.

== Publication history ==
Septology was published in Norwegian by Samlaget in three volumes: Det andre namnet: Septologien I–II (2019), Eg er ein annan: Septologien III–V (2020), and Eit nytt namn: Septologien VI–VII (2021).

It was published in English (translated by Damion Searls) by Fitzcarraldo Editions and Transit Books, under the titles The Other Name: Septology I–II (2019), I Is Another: Septology III–V (2020), and A New Name: Septology VI–VII (2021). On its publication, translations were planned into at least fourteen languages.
