= Weariness (novella) =

2014 novella by Jon Fosse

- First edition
- Author: Jon Fosse
- Original title: Kveldsvævd
- Language: Norwegian
- Genre: novel
- Published: 2014
- Publisher: Samlaget
- Publication place: Norway
- English publication date: September 2016
- Awards: Nordic Council's Literature Prize of 2015

Weariness (Nynorsk: Kveldsvævd) is a 2014 novella by the Norwegian writer Jon Fosse.

The story is set some hundred years ago. The protagonist is the elderly woman "Ales", who is the daughter of "Alida" from Fosse's earlier novellas Wakefulness and Olav's Dreams.

== Awards ==
In 2015, Fosse was awarded the Nordic Council's Literature Prize for the trilogy Wakefulness, Olav's Dreams and Weariness.
