= Jon Fosse =

Norwegian author and dramatist (born 1959)

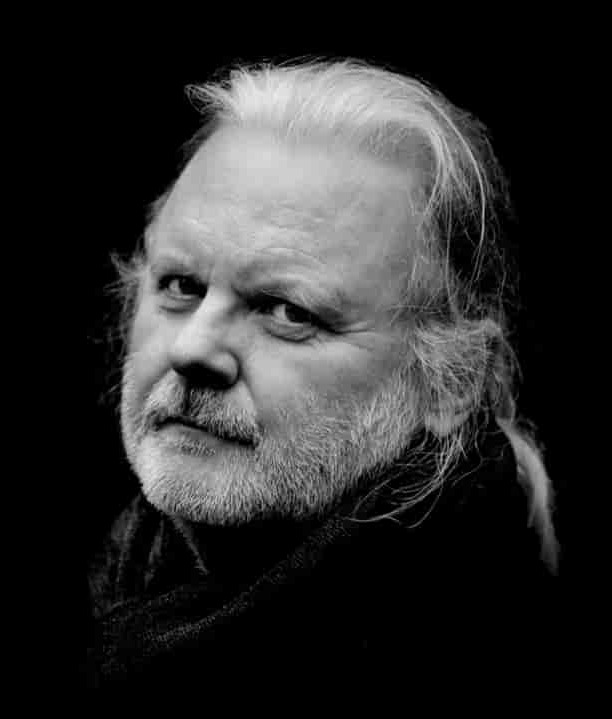
- Born: Jon Olav Fosse; 29 September 1959 (age 67); Haugesund, Rogaland, Norway
- Education: University of Bergen (BA)
- Occupations: Playwright; novelist; poet
- Spouses: Bjørg Sissel (m. 1980; div. 1992); Grethe Fatima Syéd (m. 1993; div. 2009); Anna Fosse (m. 2011)
- Children: 6
- Writing career
- Language: Nynorsk
- Notable awards: Nobel Prize in Literature (2023)
- Movement: Minimalism

Jon Olav Fosse (Norwegian: [ˈjʊ̀nː ˈfɔ̂sːə]; born 29 September 1959) is a Norwegian author, translator, and playwright. He was awarded the 2023 Nobel Prize in Literature "for his innovative plays and prose which give voice to the unsayable."

Fosse's work spans over seventy novels, poems, children's books, essays, and theatre plays, which have been translated into over fifty languages. The most performed Norwegian playwright after Henrik Ibsen, Fosse is currently—with productions presented on over a thousand stages worldwide—one of the most performed contemporary playwrights globally. His minimalist and deeply introspective plays, with language often bordering on lyrical prose and poetry, have been noted to represent a modern continuation of the dramatic tradition established by Henrik Ibsen in the 19th century. Fosse's work has often been placed within the tradition of postdramatic theatre, while several of his notable novels have been described as belonging to the style of post-modernist and avant-garde literature, due to their minimalism, lyricism and unorthodox use of syntax.

== Biography ==
Fosse was born in 1959 in Haugesund, Norway, and grew up in Strandebarm. His family were Quakers and Pietists, which he credits with shaping his spiritual views. A serious accident at age seven brought him close to death; Fosse saw a shimmering light and experienced peace and beauty: "I think this experience fundamentally changed me," Fosse recalled, "and perhaps made me a writer." He started writing around the age of twelve. As a teenager, Fosse was interested in becoming a rock guitarist, and he began to dedicate more time to writing once he gave up his musical ambitions. He also played the fiddle, and much of his teenage writing practice involved creating his own lyrics for musical pieces. Growing up, he was influenced by communism and anarchism and has described himself as a "hippie".

Fosse enrolled at the University of Bergen and studied comparative literature during which time he began writing in Nynorsk. His debut novel, Raudt, svart (Red, Black), was published in 1983 and was influenced by the Nynorsk writer Tarjei Vesaas. The novel contrasted with the social realist fiction popular in Norway at the time and emphasised linguistic expression rather than plot. He published a second novel, Stengd gitar (Closed Guitar) in 1985 and a poetic cycle, Engel med vatn i augene (Angel with Water in Its Eyes) in 1986. He gained a master's degree in comparative literature in 1987, again from the University of Bergen, and published his third novel, Blod. Steinen er (Blood. The Stone Is). Following his separation from his wife in 1989, Fosse published a novel and his first collection of essays. In the early 1990s, he continued to publish novels and worked with his second wife, Grethe Fatima Syéd, on several translations.

Fosse's first play, Og aldri skal vi skiljast (And We'll Never Be Parted), was performed and published in 1994. Fosse has written novels, short stories, poetry, children's books, essays, and plays. His works have been translated into more than forty languages. Between working on his novels, Fosse works as a translator of other authors' works.

Fosse wrote the libretto for the opera Asle og Alida (2025), composed by Bent Sørensen.

A screenplay Fosse wrote in 1998 became the 2026 film Beloved directed by Erik Poppe.

== Literary style and influences ==
Fosse writes in Nynorsk. His plays are seen as a modern continuation of the tradition established by Henrik Ibsen in the 19th century. His prose works are often said to be closer to poetry than the traditional novel. Fosse considers himself primarily a poet, regardless of the literary form he is using. Fosse's native Vestlandet is a frequently present inspiration in his writing.

Fosse mentions Samuel Beckett, as well as Georg Trakl and Thomas Bernhard as his elective relatives. Other authors and books that have influenced his life and work include Olav H. Hauge, Knut Hamsun, Tarjei Vesaas, Franz Kafka, William Faulkner, Virginia Woolf, and the Bible.

== Recognition ==
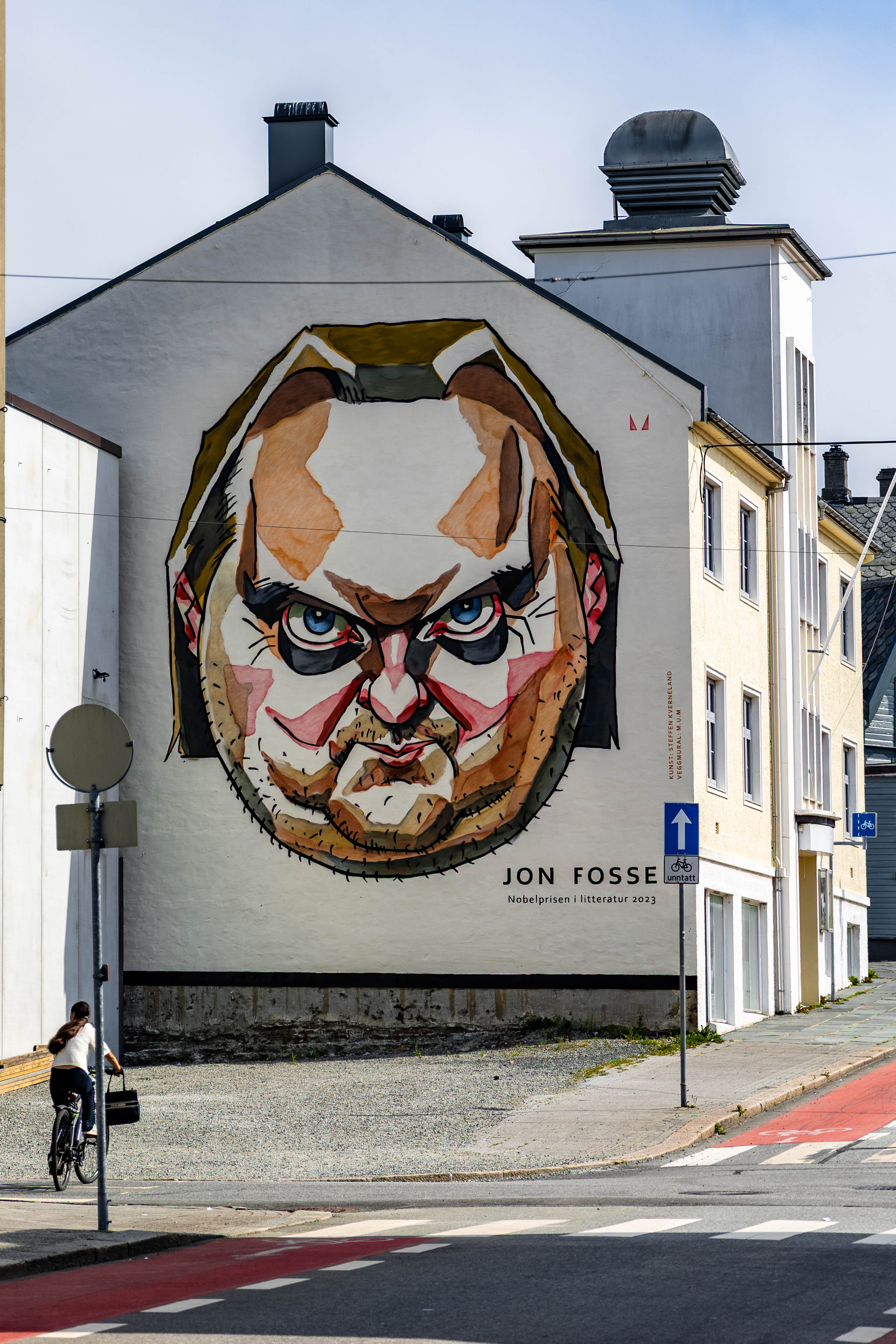
A mural of Fosse in Haugesund, Norway

Fosse is the most performed Norwegian playwright after Henrik Ibsen.

In 2003, Fosse was made a chevalier of the Ordre national du Mérite of France. He has also been ranked number 83 on the list of the Top 100 living geniuses by The Daily Telegraph.

Since 2011, Fosse has been granted the Grotten, an honorary residence owned by the Norwegian state and located on the premises of the Royal Palace in the city centre of Oslo. The use of the Grotten as a permanent residence is an honour specially bestowed by the King of Norway for contributions to Norwegian arts and culture. He was among the literary consultants for Bibel 2011, a Norwegian translation of the Bible published in 2011. He was also awarded the 2015 Nordic Council's Literature Prize for the trilogy Andvake (Wakefulness), Olavs draumar (Olav's Dreams), and Kveldsvævd (Weariness).

Many of Fosse's works have been translated into Persian by Mohammad Hamed, and his dramatic works have been performed on the main stages in Tehran, Iran. Six of Fosse's plays have been translated into American English by interdisciplinary artist Sarah Cameron Sunde, who also directed their American debut productions in New York City and Pittsburgh, Pa. The translated works which have been produced include Night Sings its Songs (2004), deathvariations (2006), SaKaLa (2008), A Summer Day (2012), and Dream of Autumn (2013).

In April 2022, Fosse's novel A New Name: Septology VI-VII, translated into English by Damion Searls, was shortlisted for the International Booker Prize. The book was named a finalist for the 2023 National Book Critics Circle Award in Fiction.

In 2026, Fosse's play Suzannah is scheduled for the Canadian premiere at Here For Now Theatre in Stratford, Ontario, directed by Peter Hinton-Davis, one of Canada's leading theatre directors and an Officer of the Order of Canada.

=== Nobel Prize in Literature ===
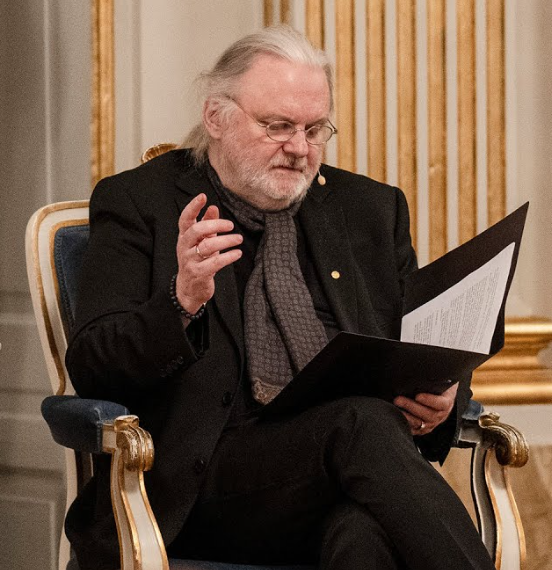
Fosse giving his Nobel lecture in December 2023.

In October 2023, Fosse was awarded the Nobel Prize in Literature for "his innovative plays and prose which give voice to the unsayable". This made him the first Nynorsk writer to receive the prize and the fourth Norwegian to win it, following Bjørnstjerne Bjørnson in 1903, Knut Hamsun in 1920, and Sigrid Undset, who won it in 1928.

Fosse was one of the favourites to win the prize in 2023, and had been tipped to be awarded the Nobel Prize in Literature for the last ten years. The choice was generally well received. "Jon Fosse is a highly deserving Nobel laureate", Gregory Wolfe of Slant Books said. "Readers willing to accept the brief 'learning curve' of adjusting to his narrative style will be well rewarded by a writer of an almost mystical sensibility." "He is an exceptional writer, who has managed to find a totally unique way of writing fiction", publisher Jacques Testard stated.

Fosse told NRK that he was "surprised but also not" to have won the prize "I’ve been part of the discussion for 10 years and have more and less tentatively prepared myself that this could happen".

Fosse delivered his Nobel lecture on 7 December 2023 at the Swedish Academy. Entitled The Silent Language, he spoke about the difference between spoken language and written language and the use and effect of silence in his works.

At the award ceremony in Stockholm on 10 December, Anders Olsson, chair of the Swedish Academy's Nobel committee, described Fosse's narrative world as "a domain beset by the greatest anxiety and torment of indecision.... [H]is writing approaches a state of uncertainty that can open a relation to the divine." Furthermore, he credited Septology with having "hypnotic power."

== Personal life ==
Fosse has been married three times. He was married to Bjørg Sissel (b. 1959), a nurse, from 1980 to 1992 with whom he had a son. The next year, he married Grethe Fatima Syéd, an Indian-Norwegian translator and author, although they later separated. They had two daughters and a son during their marriage.

Fosse spends part of his time with his third wife, Anna (m. 2011), who is Slovak, in Hainburg an der Donau in Austria. He also owns homes in Bergen and two more in other parts of western Norway. Originally, he was a member of the Church of Norway (although he described himself as an atheist before 2012). In 2012–2013, he joined the Catholic Church and voluntarily admitted himself to rehabilitation to address his long-term problem with alcohol consumption. His conversion to Catholicism helped Fosse in his effort to stop drinking. Fosse practices solitude by keeping away from noises, never watching television or listening to radio, and rarely listening to music. In his pursuit of solitude, Fosse sees writing as a confession and a prayer.

== Awards and honours ==
- 1992 Nynorsk Literature Prize
- 1996 Ibsen Prize
- 1997 Aschehoug Prize
- 1999 Søren Gyldendal Prize
- 1999 Dobloug Prize
- 2000 Nestroy Theatre Prize
- 2000 Nordic Playwright Prize
- 2003 Norsk kulturråds ærespris
- 2003 Nynorsk Literature Prize
- 2003 Chevalier of the Ordre national du Mérite of France (2003)
- 2004 Diktartavla Prize
- 2005 Brage Prize
- 2005 Commander of the Royal Norwegian Order of St. Olav
- 2006 Anders Jahres Culture Prize
- 2007 The Swedish Academy Nordic Prize
- 2007 The Federal Ministry of Family Affairs' Deutscher Jugendliteraturpreis
- 2010 The Ibsen Award
- 2012 Target Prize
- 2014 European Prize for Literature
- 2015 Nordic Council Literature Prize
- 2016 Willy Brandt Prize
- 2019 Nynorsk Literature Prize
- 2021 Brage Prize for fiction
- 2023 Nobel Prize in Literature
- The Fosse Foundation (based in Strandebarm) is an organization dedicated to Fosse and his works. The building is located near Fosse's childhood home and a house belonging to his grandparents.

== Publications ==
=== Novels & novellas ===
- Raudt, svart (Samlaget, 1983)
- Stengd gitar (Samlaget, 1985)
- Blod. Steinen er (Samlaget, 1987)
- Naustet (Samlaget, 1989) - Boathouse, trans. May-Brit Akerholt (Dalkey Archive, 2017)
- Flaskesamlaren (Samlaget, 1991)
- Bly og vatn (Samlaget, 1992)
- Melancholia I (Samlaget, 1995) - Melancholy, trans. Grethe Kvernes and Damion Searls (Dalkey Archive, 2006)
- Melancholia II (Samlaget, 1996) - Melancholy II, trans. Eric Dickens (Dalkey Archive, 2014)
- Morgon og kveld (Samlaget, 2000) - Morning and Evening, trans. Damion Searls (Dalkey Archive, 2015)
- Det er Ales (Samlaget, 2004) - Aliss at the Fire, trans. Damion Searls (Dalkey Archive, 2010)
- Andvake (Samlaget, 2007)
- Olavs draumar (Samlaget, 2012)
- Kveldsvævd (Samlaget, 2014)
- Trilogien (Samlaget, 2014) - Trilogy, trans. May-Brit Akerholt (Dalkey Archive, 2016)
- Det andre namnet – Septologien I-II (Samlaget, 2019) - The Other Name: Septology I-II, trans. Damion Searls (Fitzcarraldo Editions (UK), 2019, Transit Books (US), 2020)
- Eg er ein annan – Septologien III-V (Samlaget, 2020) - I Is Another: Septology III-V, trans. Damion Searls (Fitzcarraldo Editions (UK), 2020, Transit Books (US), 2021)
- Eit nytt namn – Septologien VI-VII (Samlaget, 2021) - A New Name: Septology VI-VII, trans. Damion Searls (Fitzcarraldo Editions (UK), 2021, Transit Books (US), 2022)
- Septologien (Samlaget, 2022) - Septology, trans. Damion Searls (Fitzcarraldo Editions (UK), 2022, Transit Books (US), 2022)
- Kvitleik (Samlaget, 2023) - A Shining, trans. Damion Searls (Fitzcarraldo Editions (UK), 2023, Transit Books (US), 2023)
- Vaim (Samlaget, 2025) - Vaim, trans. Damion Searls (Fitzcarraldo Editions (UK), 2025, Transit Books (US), 2025)
- Vaim Hotel (Samlaget, 2026) - Vaim Hotel, trans. Damion Searls (Fitzcarraldo Editions (UK), 2026, Transit Books (US), 2026)
- The Vaim Weekly (forthcoming 2027): The concluding volume of the trilogy.

=== Short fiction & essays ===
- Frå telling via showing til writing (1989)
- To forteljingar (Samlaget, 1993)
- Prosa frå ein oppvekst (Samlaget, 1994) - Scenes from a Childhood, trans. Damion Searls (Fitzcarraldo Editions, 2018)
- Hundemanuskripta (Samlaget, 1995-1997)
- Eldre kortare prosa med 7 bilete av Camilla Wærenskjold (Samlaget, 1998)
- Gnostiske essay (1999)
- Kortare prosa (Samlaget, 2011)
- Essay (Samlaget, 2011)
- Når ein engel går gjennom scenen og andre essay (2014). An Angel Walks Through the Stage: and Other Essays, trans. May-Brit Akerholt (Dalkey Archive, 2015).
- Levande stein (Samlaget, 2015)

=== Children's ===
- Uendelig Seint, illustrated by Alf-Kåre Berg (Samlaget, 1989)
- Kant, illustrated by Akin Düzakin (Samlaget, 1990)
- Dyrehagen Hardanger (Samlaget, 1993)
- Vått og svart, illustrated by Akin Düzakin (Samlaget, 1994)
- Søster, illustrated by Vá Leong (Samlaget, 2000)
- Spelejenta, illustrated by Øyvind Torseter (Samlaget, 2009)
- Fridtjov & Ingebjørg, illustrated by Oddvar Torsheim (Skald, 2014)

=== Plays ===
- Nokon kjem til å komme (written in 1992–93; first produced in 1996). Someone is Going to Come
- Og aldri skal vi skiljast (1994). And We'll Never Be Parted
- Namnet (1995). The Name
- Barnet (1996). The Child. Originally published with Mor og barn and Sonen.
- Mor og barn (1997). Mother and Child. Originally published with Barnet and Sonen.
- Sonen (1997). The Son. Originally published with Barnet and Mor og barn
- Gitarmannen (1997). The Guitar Man. Originally sent as a Christmas Greeting from Samlaget. Renamed to Saxofonmannen
- Natta syng sine songar (1997). Nightsongs, trans. Gregory Motton (2002).
- Ein sommars dag (1999). A Summer's Day
- Draum om hausten (1999). Dream of Autumn
- Sov du vesle barnet mitt (2000). Sleep My Baby Sleep
- Besøk (2000). Visits
- Vinter (2000). Winter
- Ettermiddag (2000). Afternoon
- Vakkert (2001). Beautiful
- Dødsvariasjonar (2001). Death Variations
- Jenta i sofaen (2002). The Girl on the Sofa, trans. David Harrower (2002).
- Lilla (2003). Lilac
- Suzannah (2004)
- Dei døde hundane (2004). The Dead Dogs, trans. May-Brit Akerholt (2014).
- Sa ka la (2004)
- Svevn (2005). Sleep
- Varmt (2005). Warm
- Rambuku (2006)
- Skuggar (2006). Shadows
- Eg er vinden (2007). I Am the Wind, trans. Simon Stephens (2012).
- Desse auga (2009). These Eyes
- Jente i gul regnjakke (2010).
- Kortar stykke (2011).
- Hav (2014).
- Tre librettoar (2015).
- Slik var det (2020).
- Sterk vind (2021).
- I svarte skogen inne (2023).

Compilations in English

- Plays One (2002). Someone Is Going to Come Home; The Name; The Guitar Man; The Child
- Plays Two (2004). A Summer's Day; Dream of Autumn; Winter
- Plays Three (2004). Mother and Child; Sleep My Baby Sleep; Afternoon; Beautiful; Death Variations
- Plays Four (2005). And We'll Never Be Parted; The Son; Visits; Meanwhile the lights go down and everything becomes black
- Plays Five (2011). Suzannah; Living Secretly; The Dead Dogs; A Red Butterfly's Wings; Warm; Telemakos; Sleep
- Plays Six (2014). Rambuku; Freedom; Over There; These Eyes; Girl in Yellow Raincoat; Christmas Tree Song; Sea

=== Poetry ===
- Engel med vatn i augene (1986)
- Hundens bevegelsar (1990)
- Hund og engel (1992)
- Dikt 1986–1992 (1995). Revidert samleutgåve
- Nye dikt 1991–1994 (1997)
- Dikt 1986–2001 (2001). Samla dikt. Lyrikklubben
- Auge i vind (2003)
- Dikt i samling (2009)
- Songar (2009)
- Stein til stein (2013)
- Poesiar (2016)
- Ro mitt Hav (2019)
- Dikt i samling (2011)

Compilations in English

- Poems (Shift Fox Press, 2014). Selection of poems, translated by May-Brit Akerholt.

Awards
Preceded by Edith Roger	Recipient of the Norsk kulturråds ærespris 2003	Succeeded by Jan Garbarek
