= Olav's Dreams =

2012 novel by Jon Fosse

- First edition
- Author: Jon Fosse
- Original title: Olavs draumar
- Translator: May-Brit Akerholt
- Language: Norwegian
- Genre: novel
- Published: 2012
- Publisher: Samlaget
- Publication place: Norway
- English publication date: September 2016
- Awards: Nordic Council's Literature Prize of 2015

Olav's Dreams (Nynorsk: Olavs draumar) is a 2012 novel by Norwegian writer Jon Fosse.

The story is set a few hundred years ago. The fiddler "Olav" is hunted by his past as a killer. Leaving the city and changing his name has not helped much.

== Awards ==
In 2015, Fosse was awarded the Nordic Council's Literature Prize for the trilogy Wakefulness, Olavs draumar and Weariness.
