= Heike B. Görtemaker =

German historian (born 14 February 1964)

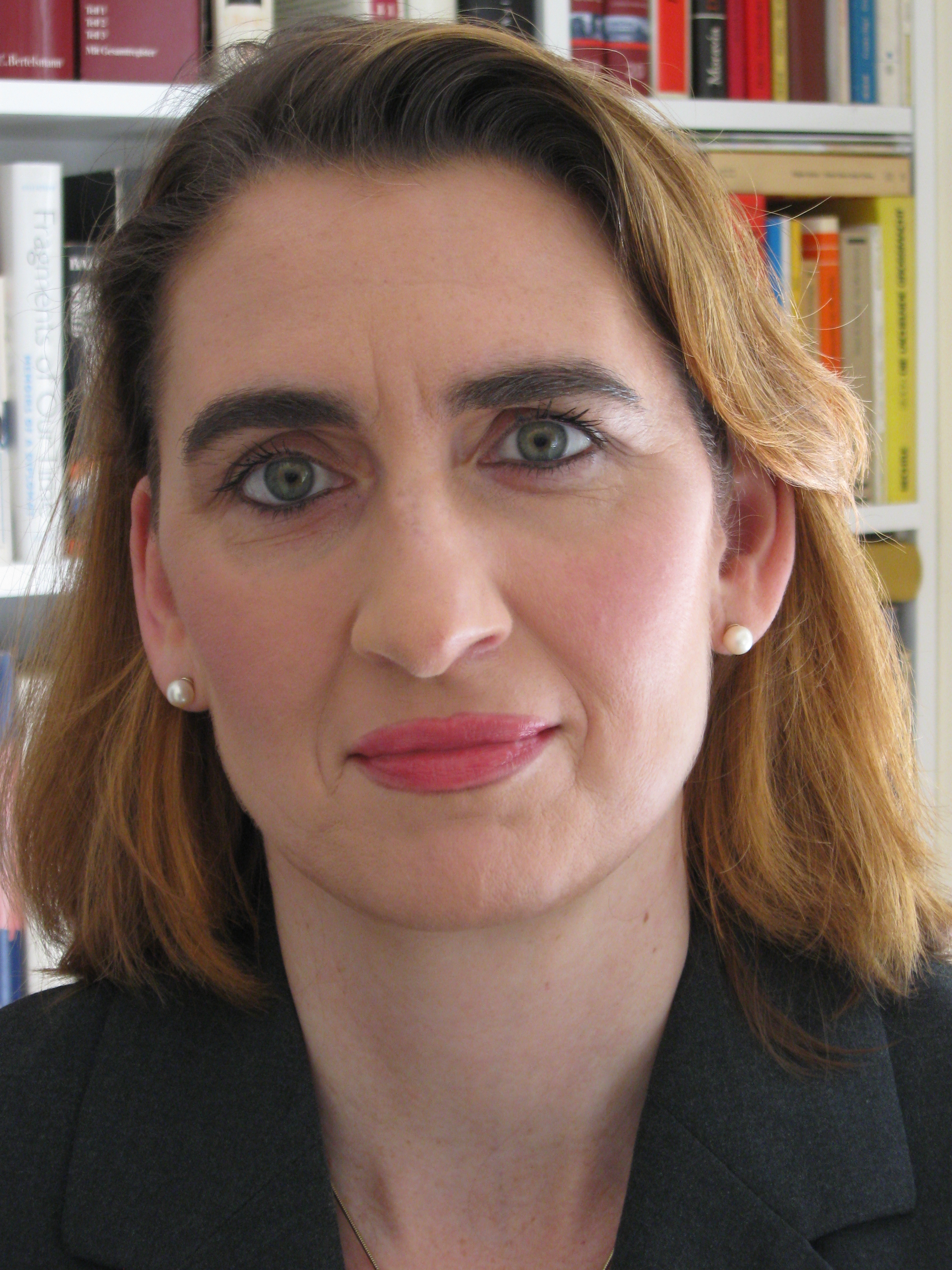
- Born: 1964 (age 61–62); Bensheim, Hesse, West Germany
- Citizenship: German
- Occupation: Historian
- Writing career
- Language: German
- Genre: Non-fiction
- Subject: Second World War

Heike B. Görtemaker (born 14 February 1964 in Bensheim, Hesse, West Germany) is a German historian known mostly for her biographies of Margret Boveri, German journalist and writer of the post-World War II period, and Eva Braun, the partner and wife of Adolf Hitler.

== Biography ==
Görtemaker studied history, economics, and German philology at Indiana University in Bloomington, Indiana (USA) and at the Free University of Berlin where she obtained a PhD in 2004 on her thesis about Margret Boveri, Margret Boveri : Journalismus und Politik im Transformationsprozeß von der NS-Diktatur zur Bundesrepublik. (Margret Boveri: Journalism and Politics in the Transformation Process from the Nazi Dictatorship to the Federal Republic). She works as a historian and author in Berlin. She has written 30 books released by over 130 various publishers, translated into 13 languages, with around 2,600 library holdings, which include Ein deutsches Leben. Die Geschichte der Margret Boveri (2005), Eva Braun. Life with Hitler (2010), and the book Hitler's Hofstaat. The inner circle in the Third Reich and after. Die Zeit magazine says that Heike B. Görtemaker describes "virtuously [...] the chaos of the last days of the regime, between the Führerbunker and Berghof".

Issued by the C.H. Beck publishing house (Munich), Görtemaker's book Eva Braun: Leben mit Hitler (Eva Braun: Life with Hitler) was the first scholarly biography of Braun and has been translated into 11 languages. Several, lighter works by other authors on Hitler's mistress had preceded the new tome. According to Der Spiegel, by taking a strictly academic approach, Görtemaker manages to dispense with many of the anecdotes that have amused and occasionally titillated readers.

Görtemaker lives in Kleinmachnow in the Potsdam-Mittelmark district in Brandenburg near Berlin with her husband, German historian Manfred Görtemaker former Vice-Chancellor of Potsdam University.

== Media ==
Görtemaker's book Eva Braun: Leben mit Hitler was featured in a lead story in Stern in the volume 7/2010 issue of 11 February 2010. and was the basis for the Spiegel TV programme Eva Hitler, geb. Braun – Leben und Sterben mit dem Führer on 15 March 2010 with TV presenter and journalist Michael Kloft.

=== Filmography ===
Heike B. Görtemaker collaborated on the following film productions.

- 2010: History, TV series, episode: Eva Hitler – Die wahre Geschichte
- 2011: Geheimnisse des Dritten Reichs, TV documentary
- 2012: Alltag unterm Hakenkreuz, TV documentary
- 2012: History, TV series, episode: Hitler, wie ich ihn sah – Die Fotografen des Diktators
- 2021: Wie kam Hitler an die Macht? 2-part TV documentary
- 2022: Rise of the Nazis, TV documentary

== Publications (selection) ==
- Ein deutsches Leben. Die Geschichte der Margret Boveri, 1900–1975. Beck, Munich 2005, ISBN 3-406-52873-2.
- Margret Boveri : Journalismus und Politik im Transformationsprozeß von der NS-Diktatur zur Bundesrepublik doctoral thesis, Free University, Berlin 2004
- Eva Braun. Leben mit Hitler. (in German) Beck, München 2010, ISBN 978-3-406-58514-2.
- Eva Braun : Life with Hitler. (transl. Damion Searls) Vintage Books, New York 2011. ISBN 978-0307595829
- Hitlers Hofstaat. Der innere Kreis im Dritten Reich und danach. (in German) Beck, Munich 2019, ISBN 978-3-406-73527-1.
- Hitler's Court: The Inner Circle of The Third Reich and After. Pen & Sword Military Ltd, Barnsley 2021, ISBN 9781526790705.
- Die Tafeln als potentielles Arbeitsfeld der Sozialpädagogik. Rhombos, Berlin 2010, ISBN 978-3-941216-19-8.
- Hitler, wie ich ihn sah - Die Fotografen des Diktators (Hitler, how I saw him - Photographs of a Dictator). DVD. 3sat, Mainz 2012.
