= Uwe Johnson =

German writer and scholar (1934–1984)

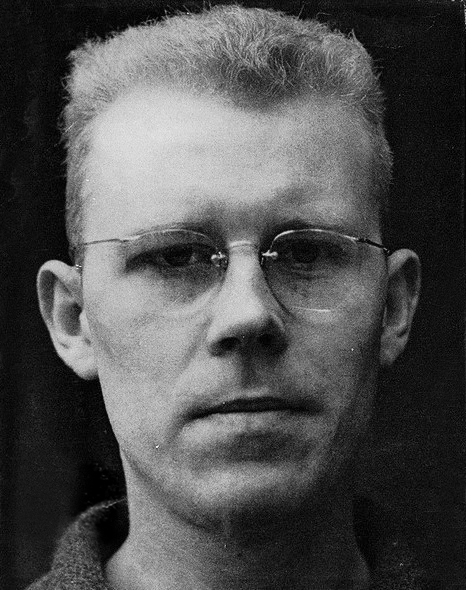
- Born: 20 July 1934; Cammin, Province of Pomerania, Free State of Prussia, German Reich
- Died: 22 February 1984 (aged 49); Sheerness, Kent, England, United Kingdom
- Occupations: Novelist, short story writer, translator
- Spouse: Elisabeth Schmidt
- Writing career
- Language: German
- Period: 1953–1984
- Notable works: Speculations About Jakob (1959); Anniversaries (1970–1983)
- Notable awards: Georg Büchner Prize; 1971; Wilhelm Raabe Prize; 1975
- Movement: Group 47

Uwe Johnson (German pronunciation: [ˈuːvə ˈjoːnzɔn]; 20 July 1934 – 22 February 1984) was a German writer, editor, and scholar. Such prominent writers and scholars as Günter Grass and Hans Mayer declared Johnson to be the most significant writer to emerge from East Germany. He was also called as "Dichter der deutschen Teilung" (lit. 'poet of the German Division').

During the 1950s, he had troubles with the East German authorities, being treated as a "dissident" both for political reasons and for Modernist experiments in his works which made him opposed to the dominant doctrine of Socialist realism; after moving to West Berlin in 1959, he gained the label of "the author of the two Germanies", as, while criticizing East Germany as the state which betrayed the Socialist ideals, he did not regard West Germany as a viable alternative and opposed the division of Germany in general.

His works were dedicated both to East and West German societies and examined the relations between them.

== Life ==
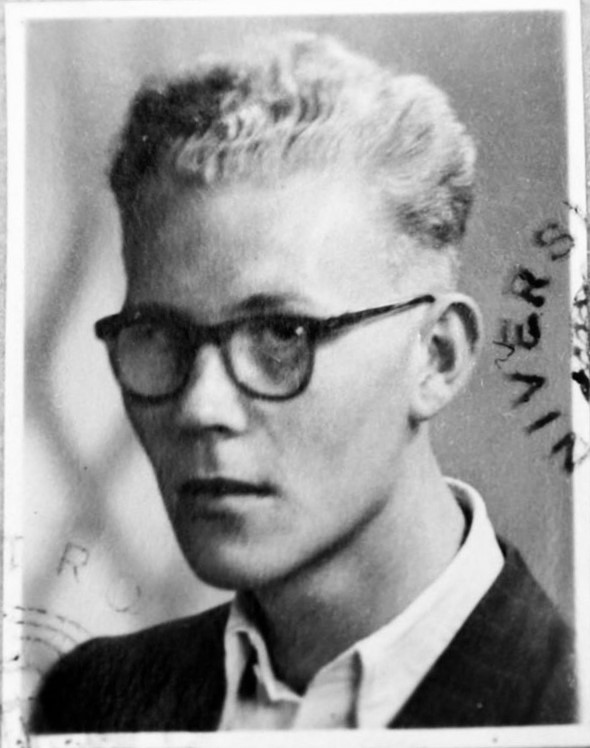
Johnson Between 1952 and 1954, photo from student identity card

Uwe Johnson was in 1934 born in Kammin, Pomerania, Prussia. He spent his first year of life in Anklam, Mecklenburg-Vorpommern, and he attended the secondary school in Guestrow from 1946, and after completing Abitur, he studied German studies in Rostock and Leipzig.

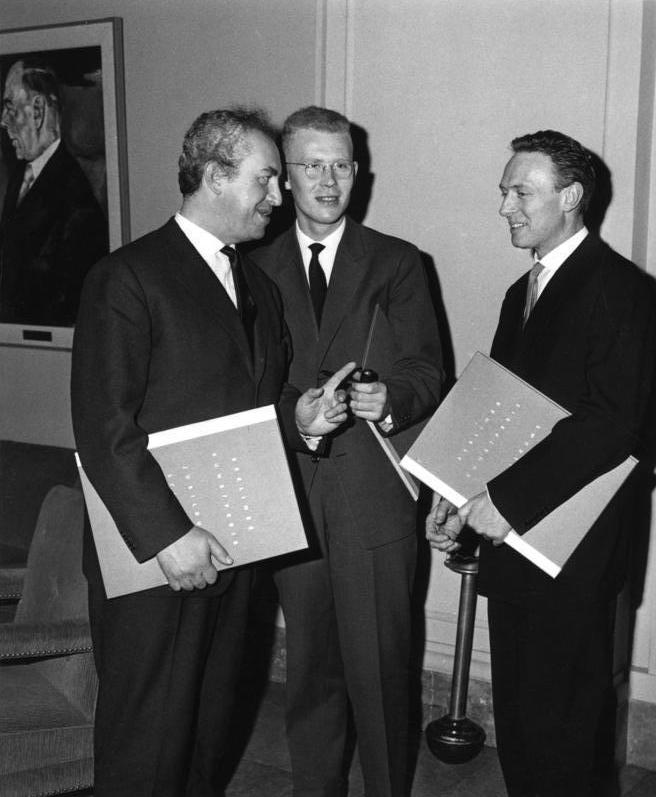
Rudolf Noelte, Uwe Johnson, Erich Schellow

U. Johnson began to write the novel Mutmassungen über Jakob (Speculations about Jakob), published in 1959 in Frankfurt a. M with publisher Suhrkamp Verlag, the same year when The Tin Drum by G. Grass and Billard um halb zehn (Billiards at half-past ten) by H. Böll were published. After two years, Johnson moved to West Berlin in 1961. He promptly became associated with Gruppe 47, which Hans Magnus Enzensberger once described as "the Central Café of a literature without a capital".

During the early 1960s, Johnson continued to write and publish fiction, and also supported himself as a translator, mainly from English, and as an editor. He travelled to America in 1961. The following year he was married, had a daughter, received a scholarship to Villa Massimo, Rome, and won the Prix International.

In 1964 he wrote reviews for the Tagesspiegel of television programmes broadcast from East Germany, published later under the title Der 5. Kanal [The Fifth Channel], 1987). In the same year he also published a collection of stories, Karsch, und andere Prosa (Karsch, and Other Prose), and, two years later, Zwei Ansichten (Two Views).

In 1965, Johnson travelled again to the United States. He then edited Bertolt Brecht's Me-ti. Buch der Wendungen. Fragmente 1933–1956 (Me-ti: the Book of Changes. Fragments, 1933–1956). From 1966 to 1968, he worked in New York City as a textbook editor at Harcourt, Brace & World, and lived with his wife and their daughter in an apartment at 243 Riverside Drive (Manhattan). In 1967, he began work on his magnum opus, Jahrestage, and edited Das neue Fenster (The New Window), a textbook of German-language readings for English-speaking students learning German.

In February 1967, the Kommune 1 moved into Johnson's apartment building in West Berlin. He first learned in a newspaper report about a plan for a "pudding attack" on the U.S. Vice-President Hubert Humphrey.

Returning to West Germany in 1969, Johnson became a member of both its PEN Center and its Akademie der Künste (Academy of the Arts). In 1970, he published the first volume of his Jahrestage (Anniversaries). Two more volumes were to follow in the next three years, but the fourth volume did not appear until 1983.

In 1972, Johnson became Vice President of the Academy of the Arts and edited Max Frisch's Tagebuch 1966–1971.

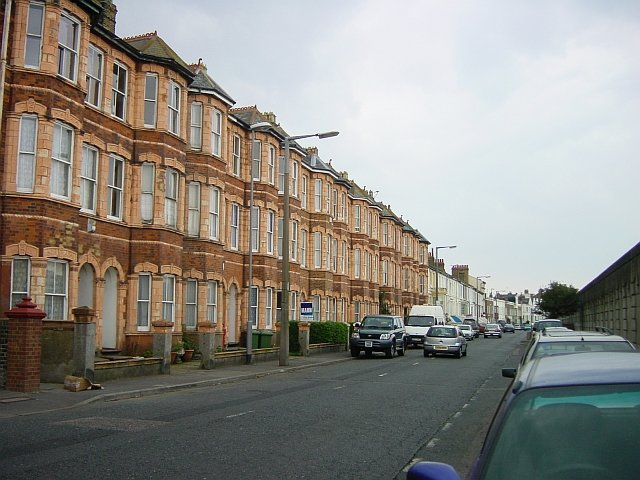
Sheerness

In 1974, Johnson, his wife and their daughter moved into 26 Marine Parade, a Victorian terrace house overlooking the sea in Sheerness on the Isle of Sheppey in Southeast England. Shortly afterwards, he broke off work on Jahrestage, due partly to health problems and partly to writer's block. However, his ten years in Sheerness were not completely unproductive. He published some shorter works and continued to do some work as an editor. In 2020, a monograph by cultural historian Patrick Wright, The Sea View Has Me Again, was published by Repeater Books, focusing on Johnson's decade living in Sheerness.

In 1977, he was admitted to the Darmstädter Akademie für Sprache und Dichtung (Darmstadt Academy for Language and Literature). Two years later he informally withdrew. In 1979, he gave a series of lectures on poetics at the University of Frankfurt, published 1980 as Begleitumstände. Frankfurter Vorlesungen.

In 1983, the fourth volume of Jahrestage was published, but Johnson broke off a reading tour for health reasons. He died from hypertensive heart disease in Sheerness on 22 February 1984.

== Marriage ==
On 27 February 1962, Johnson married Elisabeth Schmidt, whom he later (1975) accused of conducting a love affair with the Czech Mozart scholar Tomislav Volek.

== Honors ==
- 1960 – Fontane Prize, West Berlin
- 1962 – Prix International, awarded by the Formentor Group
- 1971 – Georg Büchner Prize
- 1975 – Wilhelm Raabe Prize, Braunschweig
- 1978 – Thomas Mann Prize, Lübeck
- 1983 – Literature prize from the city of Cologne

== Works ==
- Mutmassungen über Jakob (1959). Speculations About Jakob, trans. Ursule Molinaro (Grove, 1963)
- Das dritte Buch über Achim (1961). The Third Book About Achim, trans. Ursule Molinaro (1967)
- Karsch, und andere Prosa (1964). Karsch and Other Prose
  - Includes "Eine Reise wegwohin" (written in 1960). An Absence, trans. Richard and Clara Winston (1969)
- Zwei Ansichten (1965). Two Views, trans. Richard and Clara Winston (1966)
- Jahrestage. Aus dem Leben von Gesine Cresspahl (1970–83). Anniversaries: From a Year in the Life of Gesine Cresspahl, trans. Damion Searls (2018)
- Eine Reise nach Klagenfurt (1974). A Trip to Klagenfurt: In the Footsteps of Ingeborg Bachmann, trans. Damion Searls (2004)
- Berliner Sachen, Aufsätze (1975). Berlin Things: Essays
- Max Frisch Stich-Worte (1975). Max Frisch Reference
- Skizze eines Verunglückten (1982). Sketch of an Accident Victim
- Begleitumstände. Frankfurter Vorlesungen (1980). Attendant Circumstances: Frankfurt Lectures
- Ingrid Babendererde. Reifeprüfung 1953 (1985). Ingrid Babendererde: Final Exam 1953
- Inselgeschichten (1995). Island Stories: Writings from England, trans. Damion Searls (forthcoming)

=== As translator ===
- Translation of Herman Melville's Israel Potter: His Fifty Years of Exile (1961)
- Translation of Das Nibelungenlied from Middle High German (1961)
- Translation of John Knowles's A Separate Peace (1959) as In diesem Land (1963)

=== As editor ===
- Edition of Bertolt Brecht's Me-ti. Buch der Wendungen. Fragmente 1933–1956 (Me-ti: the Book of Changes. Fragments, 1933–1956) (1965)
- Das neue Fenster, a textbook of German-language readings for foreign students (1967)
- Textbook for the documentary film "A Summer in the City" (1968?)
- Co-editor with Hans Mayer, Das Werk von Samuel Beckett. Berliner Colloquium (1975, The Work of Samuel Beckett: Berlin Colloquium)

=== Short pieces ===
- Von dem Fischer un syner Fru (Of the Fisherman and His Wife; the German-language title is in dialect): a fairy tale by Philipp Otto Runge with seven pictures by Marcus Behmer, and a retelling and afterword by Uwe Johnson (1976)
- "Ein Schiff" ("A Ship") in Jürgen Habermas (ed.), Stichworte zur "Geistigen Situation der Zeit" (References on "The Spiritual Situation of the Time") (1979)
- "Ein unergründliches Schiff" ("An Unfathomable Ship") in Merkur 33 (1979)
