= Wakefulness (novella) =

2007 novella by Jon Fosse

- First edition
- Author: Jon Fosse
- Original title: Andvake
- Translator: May-Brit Akerholt
- Language: Norwegian
- Genre: novel
- Published: 2007
- Publisher: Samlaget
- Publication place: Norway
- English publication date: September 2016
- Awards: Nordic Council's Literature Prize of 2015

Wakefulness (Norwegian: Andvake) is a 2007 novella by Norwegian writer Jon Fosse.

The story is set a few hundred years ago. The young couple, "Asle" and "Alida", has come to the city of Bjørgvin, looking for a place to stay. She is expecting a child in a couple of days. Alida is an outcast, her own mother will not recognize her, and Asle is orphaned. Now they only have each other. A parallel can be drawn to the fate of Joseph and Mary in the Gospels.

== Awards ==
In 2015, Fosse was awarded the Nordic Council's Literature Prize for the trilogy Wakefulness, Olav's Dreams and Weariness.
