= Grethe Fatima Syéd =

Norwegian literary scholar, translator, and author

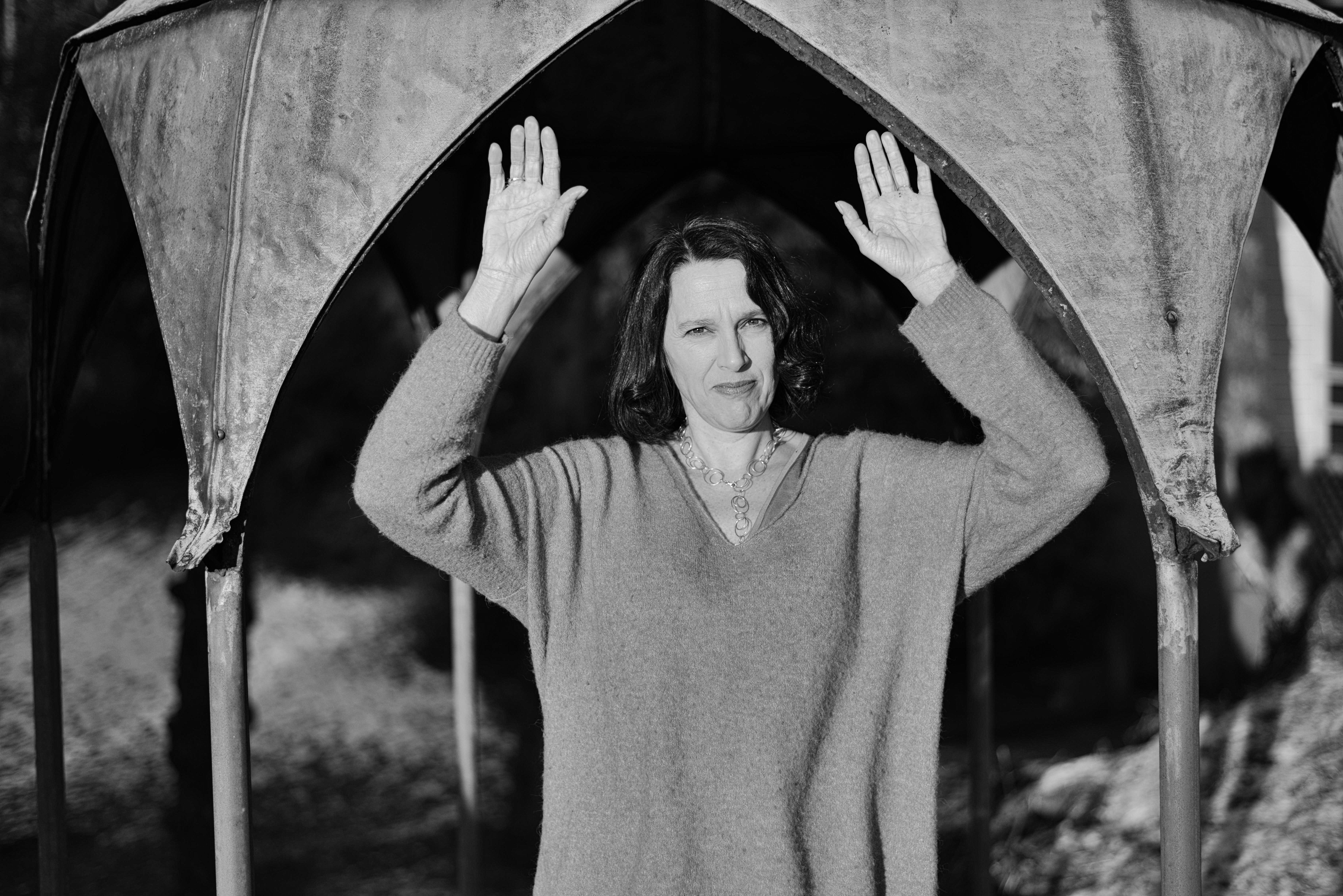
- Grethe Fatima Syéd (2018)
- Born: 1968 (age 57–58)
- Education: University of Bergen
- Occupations: Author, translator, university teacher, academic, essayist
- Spouse: Jon Fosse
- Awards: Neshornprisen (2019)

Grethe Fatima Syéd (born 1 January 1968) is a Norwegian literary scholar, translator and author. She has translated fiction from English, obtained a doctorate with a dissertation on Olav Duun, and published books about the writer Torborg Nedreaas. Her fiction debut was Eventyr for voksne (Fairytales for adults, 2020). In 2019, she was awarded the Klassekampen Neshornet culture prize for her work.

== Early life and education ==
Syéd was born in Bergen to a Norwegian mother and a father from India.

She received a cand. philol. degree in Nordic literature from the University of Bergen in 2001, with the main thesis "And so we don't know what it is!" Dialogicity in Olav Duun's Contemporary. She received her PhD on Olav Duun's texts at the University of Bergen in 2012. The doctoral thesis was titled Merciless care. Love, suicide, art and transcendence in Olav Duun's fictional world.

== Career ==
For many years Syéd was associated with the University of Bergen, She later worked as a freelance writer and literary agent. In the period 2018–2023, she was editor for Vidarforlaget's Duun publications.

Syéd has translated the works of Seamus Heaney, Gertrude Stein, Henry James, Roald Dahl, and others into Norwegian.

She is chair of the board of the Torborg Nedreaas company and a board member of the Olav Duun ring and the Tekstalliansen.

== Personal life ==
She was married to the writer Jon Fosse from 1993 to 2009, during which time she went by the name Grethe Fosse.

== Awards ==
In 2019 the Norwegian newspaper Klassekampen awarded her their Neshornet cultural prize for her work on Olav Duun.
