= Charlotte Beradt =

German writer and journalist (1907–1986)

Charlotte Beradt (born Charlotte Aron, 7 December 1901 or 1907 – 15 May 1986) was a German American journalist and translator, best known for her 1966 book collecting the dreams of German citizens under Adolf Hitler, The Third Reich of Dreams, and her translations of the work of Hannah Arendt.

== Life and work ==
Charlotte Beradt was born to a Jewish family in Forst (Lausitz) in southeastern Brandenburg in 1901 or 1907. She was the second child of Victor Leo Aron (26 September 1871 – 16 April 1928), a businessman who owned a factory across the German border in Poland, and Margarethe Behrendt Aron (28 April 1876 – 1 April 1942). The family moved to Berlin when she was five years old.

When she finished school in 1919, she joined Berlin publisher S. Fischer Verlag as an administrative assistant and apprentice, where she worked closely with Oskar Loerke and met lawyer-judge and writer Martin Beradt (1881–1949) whom she dated briefly and who later became her second husband.

In 1924, she married the journalist and author Heinz Pol (born Heinz Pollak, 1901–1972), an editor and film critic for Vossische Zeitung. The two were members of the Communist Party of Germany (KPD) and the Spartacus League, where she met (and may have had an affair with) Heinrich Blücher, who later married Hannah Arendt. (She left the party after the Moscow trials.) She gained her first journalistic experience as a freelance contributor to various daily newspapers and magazines, including Dresdner Nachrichten, Weltbühne, Die Dame, andTempo. With Heinz Pol, she edited and translated Charlie Chaplin's European travelogue into German, publishing it in 1928.

=== Under the Third Reich ===
Like many Jewish leftists, Beradt and Pol were targeted by the police. The night of the Reichstag fire, the Sturmabteilung broke into the couple's apartment and seized it. Both Beradt and Pol were arrested in the wake of the Reichstag Fire. Beradt was set free, and within days obtained the release of Heinz Pol. Decree. Pol subsequently fled to Prague. Charlotte moved in with Martin Beradt in Charlottenburg. (Pol and Beradt had separated in 1928 and divorced in October 1933.) Due to Nazi laws about Jewish people working in various occupations, in particular the October 1933 Editors' Law, she could no longer work in journalism. However, she continued to covertly print and circulate KDP leaflets and literature.

=== Life in the United States ===
The Beradts married in July 1938. They left Germany for London in July 1939, where they spent a year waiting for American visas, sponsored by Martin's cousin. They arrived in New York via the Cunard Line's Scythia in August 1940, one of its last sails before it was put into service as a troop carrier transporting servicemen to the Middle East that November.

In New York, they were initially completely penniless, and Martin's worsening blindness meant that she initially earned a living for them both, working as a hairdresser out of their apartment on West End Avenue. Her customers included many German exiles (e.g., Bella Chagall, Elisabeth Bergner) who found in the makeshift salon a strong sense of community; one client, Gerda Meyerhoff, later remembered, "It was the most literary hair-dyeing experience I have ever experienced. "The conversation was so interesting, it was such a literary environment with such clever women; the most incredible women were always coming and going."

The Beradts became American citizens in August 1946. Martin Beradt died in November 1949. In the years that followed, Charlotte began writing and reporting again. Her articles, including dozens of film and theater reviews, appeared in various German and German-language newspapers and magazines, including Deutsche Zeitung, Christ und Welt, Frankfurter Rundschau, and Aufbau. She wrote about 75 film and theater reviews for Aufbau and Frankfurter Rundschau. She also produced radio programs for public broadcaster WRD, including its flagship daily show Kritisches Tagebuch. She was particularly interested in reporting on the American civil rights movement, producing WRD stories on Adam Clayton Powell, Marcus Garvey, and Father Divine.

In 1969, she published a biography of the social democratic and communist politician Paul Levi, who was a personal friend, and released a volume of his collected essays and speeches. In 1973, she produced a radio show about Rosa Luxemburg and edited a volume of Luxemburg's correspondence.

==== Work with Hannah Arendt ====
Beradt met Arendt through her husband, Heinrich Blücher, after the pair arrived in New York in May 1941.

She translated four of Arendt's English-language lectures delivered between 1953 and 1956 into German, published in 1957 under the title Fragwürdige Traditionsbestände im politischen Denken der Gegenwart ("Questionable Traditions in Contemporary Political Thought"). In addition, she translated an Arendt essay on Karl Jaspers for publication that same year. She also translated Arendt's English-language essay "Totalitarian Imperialism: Reflections on the Hungarian Revolution" into German, and it was published under the title Die Ungarische Revolution und der totalitäre Imperialismus in 1958.

She died in New York City in 1986.

== The Third Reich of Dreams ==
Charlotte Beradt's best-known work is the 1966 book The Third Reich of Dreams, a compendium of the dreams of everyday Germans under the rising authoritarianism of the Nazi regime, which Beradt collected from 1933 to 1939.

Beradt began collecting dreams about persecution and authoritarianism in early 1933. In February of that year, a friend told Beradt that he'd dreamed of meeting Joseph Goebbels at work and struggling to salute him. (He is known in The Third Reich of Dreams as "Mr. S.") This led her to begin "systematically collect[ing] the reports of dreams under dictatorship." Between 1933 and 1939, she collected some 300 dreams.

Beradt collected the dreams secretly, writing notes in coded language, e.g., referring to figures like Hitler in familial formulations like "Uncle Hans" and calling an "arrest" a case of the flu. She hid them inside bookbindings, which she then sent to friends abroad for safekeeping, including to Heinz Pol in Prague.

A first selection of the dreams she'd collected while living in Berlin appeared in an English-language article in Free World in 1943. In 1962, she met the journalist Roland Wiegenstein while visiting Karl Otten in Locarno, Switzerland, and the two began collaborating on "Träume im Terror" ("Dreams in Terror"), a radio story about the dreams that aired on WDR in 1963. After the broadcast, editor Martin Gregor-Dellin invited her to write a book on the dreams for Nymphenburger Verlag, an independent publisher that had also published the verdicts of the Nuremberg trials, the newspaper Der Ruf, and the work of Klaus Mann.

The resulting book, which collected only a fraction of the dreams, was published in German in 1966 as Das Dritte Reich des Traums. It was, Beradt later related, incredibly unpopular: "the book received an enormous amount of criticism, did not sell at all, and was later offered on the clearance sale table." When the first English translation was published by Quadrangle Books in 1968, the accompanying essay by the Holocaust survivor and psychoanalyst Bruno Bettelheim complained that Beradt had only captured the "manifest content, that is, what the dreamer spontaneously remembered"—insufficient, he said, for drawing more than "educated guesswork" about the deeper, latent meanings of the dreams.

Since then, due in no small part to the efforts of historian Reinhart Koselleck, who contributed an essay to the second German edition of the book in 1981, The Third Reich of Dreams has gained esteem as an important document of authoritarianism and an influential text for psychoanalysts, philosophers, and historians.

The book also been translated into French, Croatian, Portuguese, Catalan, Spanish, and Italian. Out of print in English for many years, the publication rights presumed lost, The Third Reich of Dreams was republished by Princeton University Press in a new English translation by Damion Searls, with a foreword by Dunya Mikhail, in 2025.

== In popular culture ==
A documentary on Beradt's life, titled The Third Reich of Dreams, is under production. Director Amanda Rubin has received funding support from the Conference on Jewish Material Claims Against Germany, the Foundation Remembrance, Responsibility and Future, and the German Federal Ministry of Finance; in 2024, Rubin was Filmmaker in Residence at the Jewish Film Institute, where she worked on the project. In researching the film, Rubin located the English-language rights to The Third Reich of Dreams, allowing for its 2025 republication.

== Bibliography ==
=== The Third Reich of Dreams ===
==== German editions ====
- Das Dritte Reich des Traums, Nymphenburger Verlagshandlung, Munich 1966.
- Das Dritte Reich des Traums. With an afterword by Reinhart Koselleck, Suhrkamp Verlag, Frankfurt am Main 1981, new edition 1994, (Suhrkamp paperback).
- Das Dritte Reich des Traums. Edited and with an afterword by Barbara Hahn, Suhrkamp Verlag, Berlin 2016, (Suhrkamp Library Volume 1496), ISBN 978-3-518-22496-0 .

==== English editions ====
- The Third Reich of Dreams. The Nightmares of a Nation 1933–1939. Afterword by Bruno Bettelheim. Translated by Adriane Gottwald. Quadrangle Books, Chicago 1968. 2nd ed., Aquarian Press, Wellingborough, Northamptonshire 1985.
- The Third Reich of Dreams: The Nightmares of a Nation. Foreword by Dunya Mikhail. Translated by Damion Searls. Princeton UP, Princeton 2025.

==== Other translations ====
- Italian edition: Il Terzo Reich dei sogni. Foreword by Reinhart Koselleck. Afterword by Bruno Bettelheim. Translated by Ingrid Harbach. Einaudi, Turin 1991.
- French edition: Rêver sous le IIIe Reich. Preface by Martine Leibovici. Afterword by Reinhart Koselleck and François Gantheret. Translated by Pierre Saint-Germain, Payot et Rivages, Paris 2002.
- Croatian edition: Snovi pod Trećim Reichom. Afterword by Reinhart Koselleck. Translated by Damjan Lalović. Disput, Zagreb 2015.
- Portuguese edition: Sonhos no Terceiro Reich. Afterword by Reinhart Koselleck Translated by Silvia Bittencourt. Três Estrelas, 2017. 2nd ed., Fósforo, 2021.
- Spanish edition: El tercer Reich de los sueños. Translated by Soledad Nívoli and Leandro Levi, Editorial LOM, Santiago di Chile 2019.
- Catalan edition: El Tercer Reich dels somnis. Translated by Anna Punsoda. Ara Llibres, Barcelona 2020.

=== Writer ===
- Paul Levi : Ein demokratischer Sozialist in der Weimarer Republik ("Paul Levi: A democratic socialist in the Weimar Republic"), Europäische Verlagsanstalt GmbH - Verlag, Frankfurt am Main 1969.

=== Editor ===
- Rosa Luxemburg im Gefängnis: Briefe und Dokumente aus den Jahren 1915–1918 ("Rosa Luxemburg in Prison: Letters and Documents from the Years 1915–1918"), Frankfurt am Main: Fischer, 1973.
- Paul Levi, Ein demokratischer Sozialist in der Weimarer Republik ("Between Spartacus and Social Democracy: Writings, Essays, Speeches, and Letters"), Frankfurt am Main Europäische Verlagsanstalt GmbH - Verlag / Vienna: Europa-Verlag, 1969.

=== Translator ===
- Hannah Arendt: Questionable Traditions in Contemporary Political Thought. Four Essays . Translated from English by Charlotte Beradt, Frankfurt a. M.: Europ. Verlagsanstalt, 1957.
- Hannah Arendt: The Hungarian Revolution and Totalitarian Imperialism . Translated from English by Charlotte Beradt, Munich: Piper, 1958.
- Charlie Chaplin, Hallo Europa! Translated from English by Charlotte and Heinrik Pol, Leipzig: Paul List Verlag, 1928.

== Notes ==
1.Beradt's birth year is given in some sources as 1901 and others as 1907, e.g., the Germshein Translators' Lexicon UeLEX, an encyclopedia of German translators, gives the date as 1901, while the 2025 English translation of the book gives the date as 1907.
