= Heinrich Blücher =

German philosopher (1899–1970)

- Born: Heinrich Friedrich Ernst Blücher; 29 January 1899; Berlin, German Empire
- Died: 31 October 1970 (aged 71); New York City, US
- Spouse: Hannah Arendt (m. 1940)

Philosophical work
- Era: 20th-century philosophy
- Region: Western philosophy
- School: Continental philosophy Western Marxism
- Main interests: Theory of totalitarianism
- Notable ideas: The anti-political principle

Heinrich Friedrich Ernst Blücher (29 January 1899 – 31 October 1970) was a German philosopher. He was the second husband of Hannah Arendt, whom he had first met in Paris in 1936. During his life in America, Blücher traveled in popular academic circles and appeared prominently in the lives of various New York intellectuals.

== Biography ==
Blücher was born in Berlin among the poor working class of the city. He was a member of the Communist Party of Germany until 1928, but left the party in protest of its Stalinist policies. He then became a member of a small anti-Stalinist group called the Communist Party Opposition. Dwight Macdonald would later describe Blücher's political identity as a "true, hopeless anarchist." He is remembered as a philosopher, yet he "was an autodidact who had gone to night school but never graduated, a bohemian who until 1933 had worked in German cabarets."

As a Communist, Blücher had to flee Germany following the rise of National Socialism. He escaped without the necessary travel documents across the Czech border, the same route taken by his wife. During his time in France he became close friends with Walter Benjamin, through whom he met Arendt. He married Hannah Arendt in France, and they emigrated to New York City in 1941.

Heinrich Blücher began teaching philosophy at Bard College in 1952, despite having no post-secondary education, continuing for seventeen years, as well as at the New School for Social Research. While there he continued to hold radical anti-establishment views, stating in a lecture that "The C.I.A. has infiltrated the National Student Organization. That means we are being bribed, we are being used, and we are no longer academicians any more." Later in the same lecture he insisted, that if "what the government says must be right, it must be spread, and no dissent shall be possible. If they call that consensus, then to hell with it." He argued that America was now "doing what the others (the totalitarians, the Russians) did all along." He died of a heart attack at the age of 71, in the apartment he shared with Arendt at 370 Riverside Drive, New York City. His wife Hannah Arendt was later buried alongside him at Bard College Cemetery.

== Marriage to Hannah Arendt ==
Arendt and Blücher met in 1936, in a café along the rue Soufflot frequented by their friend Walter Benjamin and other German émigrés. Arendt was twenty-nine, Blücher thirty-seven. Both were fugitives from the Nazis. Blücher was considered a communist militant, thus he lacked the requisite permis de séjour to work and had to move frequently from hotel to hotel. Both were still formally married, but separated from their spouses. Due to the pressures of lacking citizenship and their marital status, Blücher would not marry Arendt until 1940, despite accounts reporting that they fell in love immediately. The marriage would last until his death; however, it would change in relation and normalcy over time. By 1952, the marriage was polyamorous. In a letter to Blücher, Arendt expressed joy at this, writing, "Yes, love, our hearts have really grown toward each other and our steps go in unison. These fools who think themselves loyal if they give up their active lives and bind themselves together into an exclusive One; then they have no common life but generally no life at all. If it weren't so risky, one should one day tell the world what a marriage really is."

== Political thought ==
Blücher encouraged his wife to become involved with Marxism and political theory, though ultimately her use of Karl Marx was in no way orthodox, as shown in such works as The Origins of Totalitarianism (1951) and The Human Condition (1958). Blücher also coined the term "the anti-political principle" to describe totalitarianism's destruction of a space of resistance — a term taken up both by Arendt and Karl Jaspers.

Blücher believed, alongside Arendt and Martin Heidegger, that science held a corresponding mindset which threatened first religion, and now philosophy. He argued that this belief, which he saw best displayed in Alfred North Whitehead's Science and the Modern World, was the same belief as the pre-socratic thinker Heraclitus. Namely, he saw science and Heraclitus agreeing on the claim that "there is a rational order of things that is also a natural order of things". He also distinguished Heraclitus from metaphysics, arguing that "Heraclitus, as well as Buddha, Socrates, Jesus, and all of the others we are considering here was an entirely non-mystical philosopher and also an entirely non-magical being." He saw Heisenberg's uncertainty principle as indicative of a need for the development of an explicit and rigorous philosophy of science. He furthered this necessity by the invocation of the deification of science along Kantian lines, writing that the "fact that at the very moment when man wanted to set a principle above himself and then failed to call that principle either God or the Absolute (because both are allowed), but rather chose something concrete to make into an absolute (like human reason or what not) --- this very fact indicates one thing, and that is whenever something concrete is taken to be an absolute it all boils down to the same contention, that man is God." Although, interestingly, he placed God as the result of morality, writing that "there is not a single one, science, art, philosophy, politics, or religion, that does not have its root in the question of morality."

Blücher came to reject both religion and science as sources of morality, and instead posed what may be interpreted as a classical republican conception of freedom, writing that "Everything we do involves an ethical and moral decision. We have to regain that freedom. We have believed for too long that we could be told what to do. They tried to tell us what to do on the authority of God; they tried to tell us what to do on the authority of science, and both no longer hold. We have to make up our own minds as to what we shall do and what we will do. That is the essence of freedom. It is not a freedom that is at hand. It is a freedom that has to be established, that has to be kept, and that has to be developed, or it vanishes like thin air."

== In popular culture ==
Axel Milberg plays Heinrich Blücher in the 2012 film Hannah Arendt, which takes place during and after Arendt's research and publication of Eichmann in Jerusalem. Blücher is portrayed as a loving husband, who plays an active role in Arendt's life. He is also shown to be active in the social circles Arendt and he travel in, posed in frequent heated debate with Hans Jonas. He is described in the movie as having followed Rosa Luxemburg "to the end". In the movie he is seen deeply in love with Arendt, despite the indication of mutual infidelities that imply a marriage based in some form of polyamory. He is also shown as emotionally supportive of Arendt during the fallout from the aforementioned publication, consoling her on the loss of her friend Kurt Blumenfeld.

== Publications ==
- The Axis Grand Strategy: Blueprints for the Total War, Published 1942. (It is unclear the amount of Blücher's involvement in this project).
- Blücher, Heinrich, Rösener, Ringo, ed. (2020). Versuche über den Nationalsozialismus, Göttingen, Wallstein
