= Notes on the Melody of Things =

1898 text by Rainer Maria Rilke

Notes on the Melody of Things (original title, in German: Notizen zur Melodie der Dinge) is an 1898 text by the Austrian writer Rainer Maria Rilke.

== Writing and publication ==
Rilke wrote "Notes on the Melody of Things" at age 23. He was influenced by his relationship with psychoanalyst and writer Lou Andreas-Salomé, a colleague and close companion of Friedrich Nietzsche who introduced Rilke to the philosopher's work, as well as a visit to Florence in 1898 in which he studied Renaissance painting.

The piece was not published during Rilke's lifetime, but many of its ideas would appear in Rilke's essay "The Value of the Monologue," also published in 1898.

The piece was eventually published in the fifth volume of Rilke's collected works, between 1955 and 1966 in Frankfort and Wiesbaden. Writer Damion Searls later translated the text into English for his 2010 anthology, The Inner Sky: Poems, Notes, Dreams.

== Themes ==
"Notes on the Melody of Things" discusses theater criticism, landscape painting, human relations, memory, and solitude., and of humans' relationship to the natural world, mediated through art. In the text, Rilke characterizes the world as the background of a medieval or Renaissance-era painting, glowing behind human figures. He uses the phrase "melody of the background" to describe the atmosphere of such a landscape as a "melody" connecting all of human life and nature, and argues that one must understand this melody to understand the world.
