= The Name (play) =

1995 play written by Jon Fosse

The Name (Nynorsk: Namnet) is a 1995 play by the Norwegian writer Jon Fosse. It tells the story of a young couple, expecting a child, who move in with the woman's parents, with failures in communication as a consequence. The play premiered on 27 May 1995, directed by Kai Johnsen for Den Nationale Scene in Bergen, during the Bergen International Festival. A production by the German theatre company Schaubühne and the director Thomas Ostermeier was performed at the 2000 Salzburg Festival.

The play was awarded the Norwegian Ibsen Award. Together with Claude Régy's 1999 Nanterre production of Someone is Going to Come, Ostermeier's production of The Name became Fosse's definitive international breakthrough.
