= Avner Avraham =

Israeli artist

- אבנר אברהם
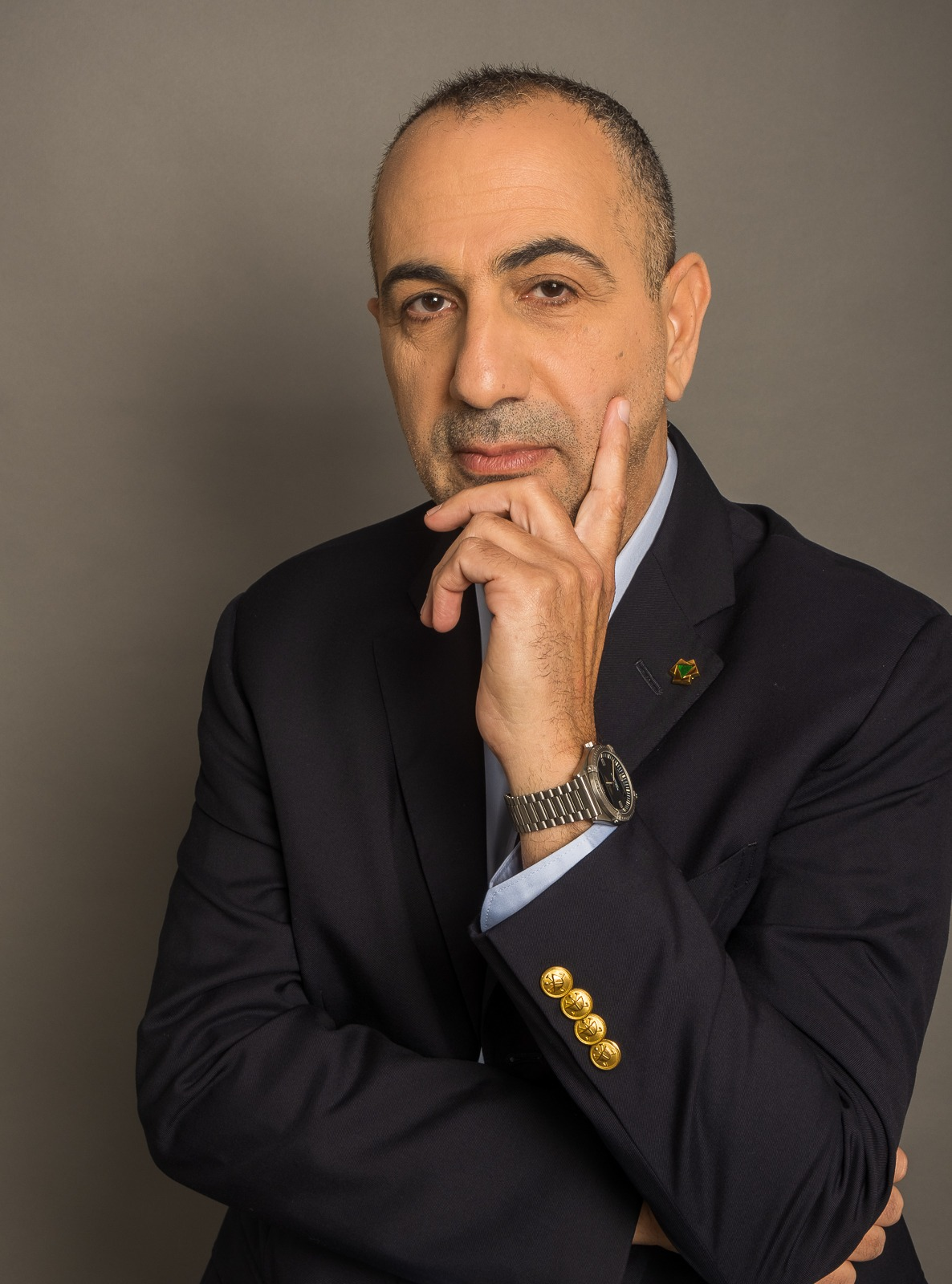
- Born: January 1, 1965
- Website: www.aavner.com

Avner Avraham (Hebrew: אבנר אברהם; born January 1, 1965) is a former Mossad official artist, journalist, deputy editor of the "Intelligence Heritage Center" magazine, curator of spy and art exhibitions, curator, and producer of spy films, founder and owner of the international lecturer agency 'Spy Legends', and 'Women Speakers Online'.

== Biography ==
Avraham was born and educated in Holon to parents from the city of Mosul in Iraq, who immigrated to Israel in 'Operation Ezra and Nehemiah'. After studying electronics and computers at the ORT Holon school, he enlisted in the IDF in 1983. After a course as a communications technician, he was assigned to the 'Nahal' Brigade. Later, as part of the National Liaison Battalion, he was attached to the Mossad's branch in Beirut. In 1987, he was discharged from permanent service. He then served in the reserve, first as a national liaison battalion officer and later as a casualty officer, and was discharged from service in 2015 with the rank of major. Avraham holds a bachelor's degree in computer science, a master's degree in business administration and entrepreneurship, as well as a certificate in museology and curatorial honors at Tel Aviv University. [Source required] In 1987 he began working at the institution. During his 28 years of service, he has held various positions in Israel and other countries. In his last years in the organization, he initiated, established, and managed the Museum of Intelligence and Special Functions and served as the museum's chief curator. In this context, he has curated dozens of exhibitions. Avraham completed his service in the organization with the same rank of Lt. Col.

== Curators and exhibition production ==
=== Capturing Adolf Eichmann ===
In 2011 the exhibition was presented at the Mossad headquarters and later at the Shin Bet headquarters. The exhibition included original objects and rare documents. In December 2011, at the request of the Prime Minister's Office, the exhibition was presented in the Israeli in Jerusalem. The exhibition was extensively reproduced in English and thus adapted for the benefit of the American audience. in addition, new chapters were added dealing with the background to capturing Eichmann, and the trial effects on society. The exhibition traveled in the United States between 2016 and 2020 and has been exhibited in major and well-known museums, including The Holocaust Museum in Argentina, The World War II Museum in New Orleans, The Jewish Museum of Cleveland, The Illinois Holocaust Museum, The Heritage Museum in New York, The Jewish Holocaust Museum in Florida, the Holocaust Documentation Center in Florida, the Holocaust Museum in Houston, the U.S National Museum of World War II, and the Holocaust Center, in Michigan.

=== Operation Jonathan ===
In 2011 the exhibition was presented at Mossad's headquarters. One of the valuable objects present in it was Yonatan Netanyahu's protective vest. In 2015, the exhibition was rebuilt and presented at the Yitzhak Rabin Center for about two years. Among the visitors to the exhibition were former Prime Minister Benjamin Netanyahu, former President Shimon Peres, Entebbe kidnappers, soldiers and commanders who took part in the operation, government officials, and others.

=== Operation Moses ===
In 2013, the exhibition was presented at Mossad's headquarters. It was later exhibited at the Nation Buildings and later at 'Beit Hatfutsot' in Tel Aviv (today 'ANU' Museum of the Jewish people).

== Art exhibitions ==
Avraham curated and produced dozens of art exhibitions in Israel. Prominent among them:

- Appearance' – artist Rachel (Rachelly) Roggel – presented at Mossad – 2012
- Avner Avraham – Solo Exhibition" at the "Green House" Gallery, Tel Aviv, 2015
- Smadar Kilczynski' – at Dorit Gur Gallery, Jaffa, 2015
- The emoji is attacking the roads" for the Green Light Association at the Green House Gallery, Tel Aviv, 2015
- Crane to the Horizon", at the "Gallery" Gallery, Tel Aviv, 2015
- Tel Aviv – there is still something in it" at Dorit Gur Gallery, Jaffa, 2015
- The Oven" at the Yosef Zaritzky Artists' House, Tel Aviv, 2016
- UP-21" Photo exhibition on the subject of children with Down syndrome at the Enav Cultural Center, Tel Aviv, 2016
- Daniel's Sky" from the photographs of Staff Sergeant Daniel Marsh at the Yitzhak Rabin Center, Tel Aviv, 2016
- Fifty Shades of Religion" – photo exhibition at Tel Aviv University, Tel Aviv, 2016
- Avnei Hachoshen" at the "Green House" Gallery, Tel Aviv, 2016
- Colors of Silence" An art exhibition inspired by the songs of Simon and Garfunkel, and a tribute show at the "Green House" gallery, Tel Aviv, 2016
- Get up and walk in the country" Exhibition and show by the singer Yehuda Elias at the "Green House" gallery, Tel Aviv, 2016.
- Collection of 5 generations of painters from Camille Pissarro's family – "Collecting Pissarro" at the Rally Museum, Caesarea, 2017
- Safed, If You Were Paris" at Gallery 12, Jaffa, 2019

== Spyware Advice ==
Avraham advises spy films, the largest of which is Operation Finale The Mossad – A Covert Story, and 'A Jewish Soul'. Avraham provides production and supply of documents and objects for films from different periods.

== Outstanding projects and activities ==
Avraham lectures in Israel and around the world on the capture and trial of Eichmann, the Mossad in Operation Entebbe, Operation Brothers, creativity from the world of espionage, and the great operations of the Mossad. Avraham is represented by the Harry Walker Lecturer Agency. Deputy editor and writer for the MLM magazine (Center for the Heritage of Intelligence, Gelilot, Israel). Since 2016, editor and broadcaster of the weekly radio program "Art is the Voice" on 'Radio-Kassem 106 FM'. And producers medals dealing with the prominent and significant operations of the State of Israel and the Mossad such as the capture of Adolf Eichmann, Operation Entebbe, Operation Brothers, Operation Diamond, Operation Ezra and Nehemiah, Operation and more The medals include symbols, codes that accompany written material.

== Personal life ==
Divorced and father of a son and an adult daughter, lives in Herzliya. Active and contributing to lone soldiers.

== Awards ==
- 2019, Kentucky Colonel (Ann), Governor of the State of Kentucky, United States
- 2019, Jay and Marilyn Weinberg, Rule of Law Award, United States
