= Someone is Going to Come =

Play by Jon Fosse

Someone is Going to Come (Norwegian: Nokon kjem til å komme) by the Norwegian writer Jon Fosse. He wrote it in 1992, but it was not published or staged until 1996.

== Plot ==
The story tells of a couple who have bought an old house in a remote seaside setting and are visiting it for the first time. They bought it in order to “be alone together.” While there, the man who owned the house previously appears unannounced and seeks a closer relationship to the woman. Her partner reacts with jealousy and latent paranoia. The old house is filled with the belongings of its former inhabitants, who seem to have died while living there. The beds are unmade, a bedpan half-full in the bedroom.

== Reception ==
The play was Fosse's breakthrough in Europe. Nokon kjem til å komme was the first drama Jon Fosse wrote in 1992, but it was not published or staged in Norway until 1996, and then in Paris in 1999. Nokon kjem til å komme is Fosse's most performed play and has been performed (as of 2024) around a thousand times. The English translation by Gregory Motton (2002) was performed in Washington, DC.
