= Nightsongs (play) =

Nightsongs (Nynorsk: Natta syng sine songar) is a 1997 play by the Norwegian writer Jon Fosse. It tells the story of a young couple who just had their first child. The man tries to become a writer but is constantly rejected by publishers while the woman is growing tired of their situation. The play premiered in 1997 at Rogaland Teater in Stavanger, directed by Kai Johnsen.

== Reception ==
Hans Rossin of Dagbladet compared the play to A Doll's House by Henrik Ibsen, and wrote: "But in terms of form, this is persistently Fosse. He continues to refine his linguistic minimalism with brief verbality on the surface and depths of emotions and charged situations below. Like earlier pieces, Nightsongs is also open in the sense that the realism in the texts can be put out as a straight depiction of a town where caricatured tough guys play the lead. Or they can be seen as abrupt and rather anti-realist allegories over human conditions in our time."

Charles Spencer of The Daily Telegraph reviewed the 2002 performance at the Royal Court Theatre in London: "The first line of Nightsongs is to prove eerily prophetic. 'I can't stand it any more. No I can't bear it.' It is a feeling likely to be shared by anyone unlucky enough to sit through this wretchedly pretentious, interminably boring drama by the Norwegian dramatist Jon Fosse. ... The aim of this infuriating piece is presumably to make the audience experience the same emotions as the characters on stage - depression, desperation, a terrible lassitude of spirit. It certainly succeeds, but what a perverse and pointless exercise."

== Adaptation ==
The play was the basis for the 2004 film Nightsongs. The film was a German production directed by Romuald Karmakar and starred Frank Giering and Anne Ratte-Polle.
