= Susanne Kippenberger =

German journalist and author (born 1957)

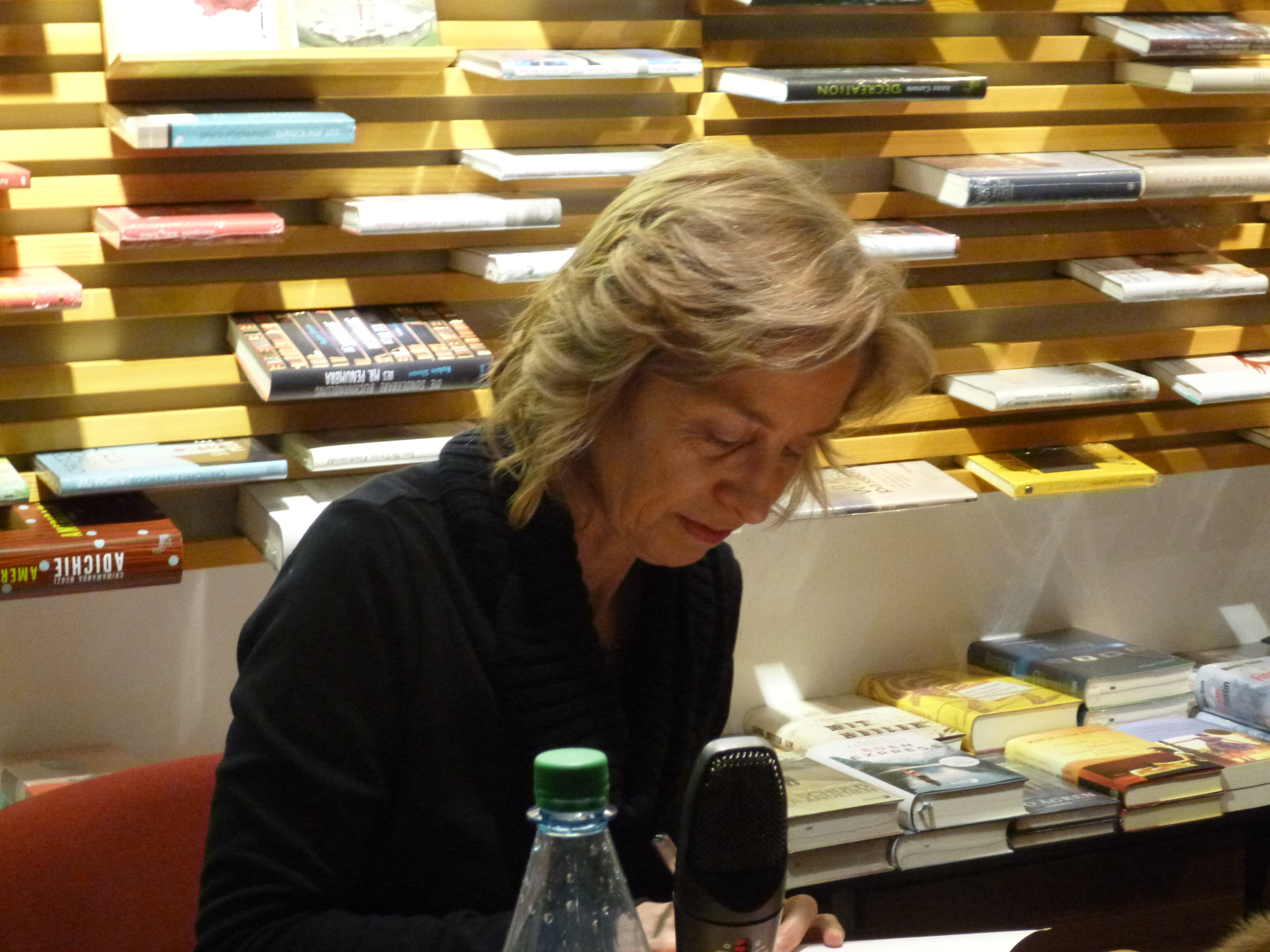
Susanne Kippenberger in 2015

Susanne Kippenberger (born 29 August 1957 in Dortmund) is a German journalist and author. She grew up in Essen and studied German, English and American studies in Tübingen. She is a former Fulbright scholar. Having worked at various German news outlets, she joined the Berliner Tagesspiegel in 1989, where she has remained ever since.

Kippenberger has written three books to date. Her first book, Kippenberger: The Artist and His Families, dealt with her elder brother, the famous German artist Martin Kippenberger. This title has since been translated into English by Damion Searls.
