= Clemens Berger =

Austrian writer

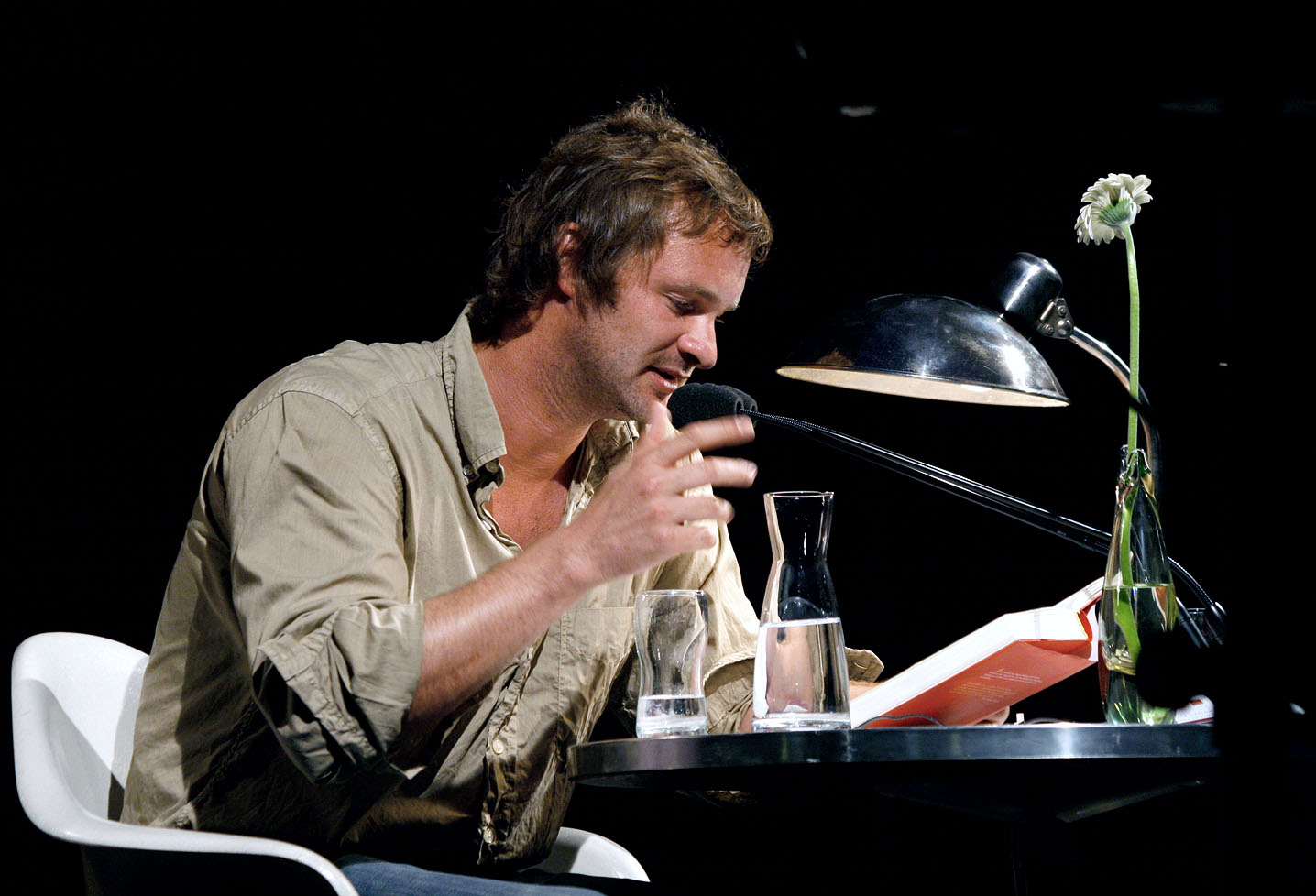
Clemens Berger (O-Töne literary festival, 2010)

Clemens Berger (born 20 May 1979, in Güssing) is an Austrian writer. Since 2017 he is a contributor and co-editor of Versopolis, The European Review of Poetry, Books and Culture, a pan-European online literary magazine.

He grew up in Oberwart and studied philosophy and publicity in Vienna, where he currently lives.

== Works ==
- Der gehängte Mönch (2003)
- Paul Beers Beweis (2005)
- Die Wettesser (2007)
- Gatsch / Und Jetzt. Zwei Stücke (2009)
- Und hieb ihm das rechte Ohr ab (2009)
- Das Streichelinstitut (2010)
- Engel der Armen (2011)
- Im Jahr des Panda (2016)
