= Dream of Autumn =

Dream of Autumn (Nynorsk: Draum om hausten) is a 1999 play by the Norwegian writer Jon Fosse. The narrative is set at a graveyard before a funeral. A husband and wife converse and are joined by the man's parents.

The play premiered on 8 September 1999 at the National Theatre in Oslo, directed by Kai Johnsen. The play received many positive reviews internationally, which marked a change from Fosse's earlier plays, which had received a mixed response outside Scandinavia.
