= Christopher Kippenberger =

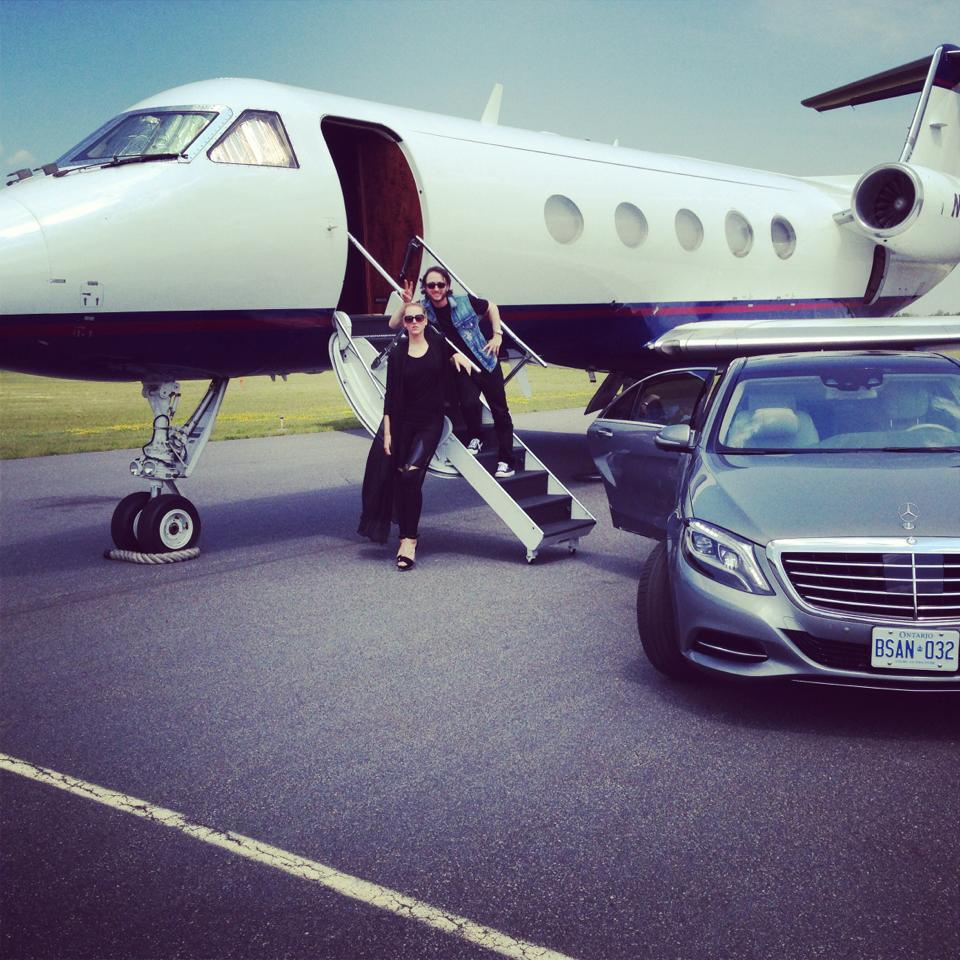
Kippenberger on location

Christopher Kippenberger is an American-German filmmaker, creative director, publisher, designer and visual artist. Kippenberger has been called "the most interesting man in car porn," and "the Terry Richardson of car videos."

== Biography ==
Kippenberger began his career in San Francisco and Los Angeles as a post production specialist. He then relocated to Europe, later collaborating with Spike Jonze to help create vice.com predecessor VBS.tv and going on to found Studio Kippenberger.

== Studio Kippenberger ==
Studio Kippenberger is the production arm of Chris Kippenberger’s practice. Headed by Kippenberger, the studio has worked with Bugatti, Porsche, Rolls-Royce, Mercedes-Benz, BMW, Vimeo, and Intel in recent years. In addition to production, Studio Kippenberger provides marketing services.

Studio Kippenberger's productions range from client-oriented shorts to the documentary portraits Isle of Man TT and Kart Kids. Isle of Man TT is a profile of the annual motorcycle race of the same name and its participants. In interviews with the event's racers and their teams, the film explores the circuit's appeal in spite of its deadly reputation. Isle of Man TT was an official selection of the 2015 London Motor Film Festival. Kippenberger's film Kart Kids is a look into the world of youth karting. Profiling a selection of adolescent racers for over ten years, Kart Kids focuses the sport's high-stakes nature. In 2018 Kippenberger published How A Rolls-Royce Fucks with Your Brain, centered on what he dubbed the "post-luxury consumer."

== Advanced Aviation Prototyping & Robotics ==
Kippenberger stated in a 2012 interview about UAV videography published in Wired, “Drones are strictly tools [for] creating a certain look we want to achieve. This is only the very early beginning of this movement and we are thrilled to be involved at such an early stage" Kippenberger participated in the Drones and Aerial Robotics Conference held at New York University in October 2013 and the TED Conference in Berlin in June 2014.

== Véhicule ==
Christopher Kippenberger’s Véhicule brand was founded in 2019 as a multi-channel platform for “avant-garde transportation.” Véhicule’s first undertaking was an annual magazine exploring the intersections between transportation, popular culture and fine art. The 2020 issue of Véhicule Magazine featured an in-depth investigation of the Miami drug smuggling and powerboating scene in the 1980s. Véhicule expanded their digital-media presence following its print issue, producing documentary filmmaking and content centered on current events and news.

Véhicule Marine is a Florida-based firm specializing in designing and developing high-powered seagoing watercraft. Véhicule Automotive is another segment of the brand, which restored of G-Wagens, modifying them with new engines, suspensions and interior fittings. Véhicule has also expanded to include apparel.
