= Kurt Blumenfeld =

German zionist

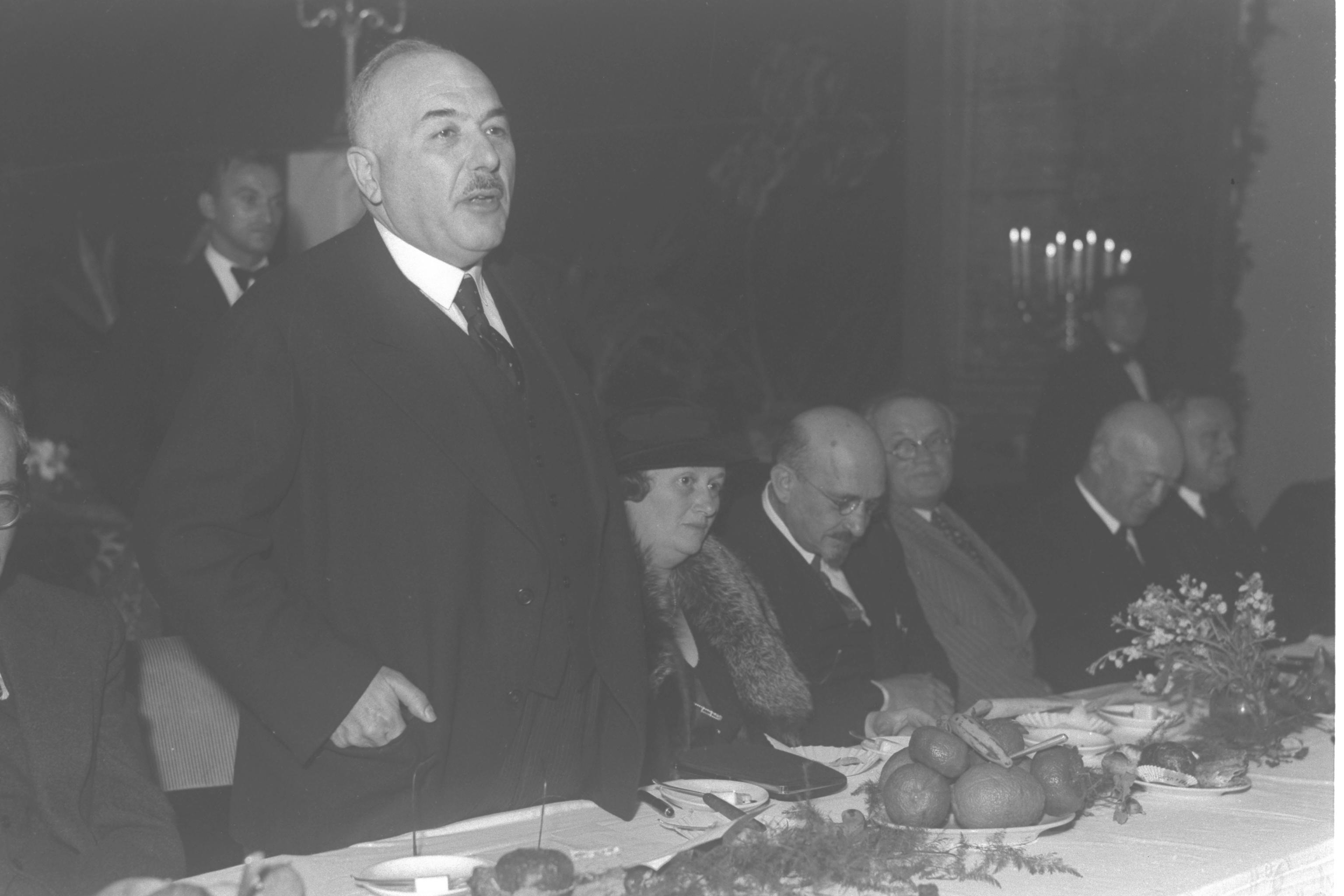

Kurt Blumenfeld (German: [ˈbluːmənfɛlt]; May 29, 1884 – May 21, 1963) was a German-born Zionist from Marggrabowa, East Prussia. He was the secretary general of the World Zionist Organization from 1911 to 1914.

He had served as secretary of the Zionist Federation of Germany from 1909 to 1911 and later served as president of that organisation from 1924 to 1933, when he fled the rising tide of antisemitism in Nazi Germany for Israel, after they had searched his Berlin home. He was a good friend of Hannah Arendt. Blumenfeld opposed the Anti-Nazi boycott saying “The boycott harms German Jews first and foremost. The boycott has no favorable results for us.”

He died in Jerusalem, Israel, in 1963 at the age of 78.

== Works ==
- Kurt Blumenfeld und Hans Tramer: Erlebte Judenfrage. Ein Viertel-Jahrhundert deutscher Zionismus. Stuttgart 1962
- Im Kampf um den Zionismus. Briefe aus fünf Jahrzehnten. Stuttgart 1976
- Hannah Arendt und Kurt Blumenfeld: ... in keinem Besitz verwurzelt. Die Korrespondenz, hrsg. von Ingeborg Nordmann und Iris Pilling, Hamburg 1995, ISBN 388022806X

== Sources ==
- Elon, Amos (2006). "The Excommunication of Hannah Arendt". World Policy Journal. 23 (4): 93–102. doi:10.1162/wopj.2007.23.4.93. JSTOR 40210059.
- "Kurt Blumenfeld Dies in Israel; Zionist Leader in Germany, 79". New York Times. 23 May 1963. p. 35.
- Laqueur. History of Zionism. p. 156.
