= James Bulgin =

British historian and public historian

James Bulgin (born 1979) is a British historian, author and public historian specialising in Holocaust history, historical memory and twentieth-century conflict. He is Head of Public History at the Imperial War Museums (IWM), where he led the development of the museum's Holocaust Galleries, which opened in 2021.

Bulgin has presented and advised on documentary programmes including How the Holocaust Began, Rise of the Nazis, D-Day: The Unheard Tapes, World War II with Tom Hanks, and Auschwitz: Evolution of Terror. He has written books and scholarly publications on Holocaust history, museum interpretation and historical memory, including The Holocaust, published by Imperial War Museums.

== Early life and education ==
Bulgin was born in London in 1979 and was educated at Salesian College, Farnborough. He studied English at Royal Holloway, University of London, graduating with a Bachelor of Arts degree, before undertaking postgraduate training in Musical Theatre at the Guildford School of Acting.

In 2013, Bulgin began an MA in Holocaust Studies at Royal Holloway before undertaking doctoral research in Holocaust and Related Studies. He was awarded a Doctor of Philosophy (PhD) in 2022 for his thesis, The Holocaust and the Apocalyptic Cultural Imagination of the Cold War.

== Career ==
=== Theatre ===
Bulgin began his career as an actor in 2001 under the stage name James Milton. Shortly after graduating from the Guildford School of Acting, he appeared in Richard Cameron's play The Glee Club at the Duchess Theatre in London's West End.

He subsequently worked as an actor, director and producer in theatre. In 2006, he was awarded a Society of London Theatre Stage One Bursary, through which he produced a number of stage productions alongside producer Paul Morrissey.

During this period, Bulgin developed an academic interest in the representation and memory of the Holocaust, leading him to undertake postgraduate study in Holocaust history at Royal Holloway, University of London.

=== Imperial War Museums ===
In 2014, Bulgin joined the Imperial War Museums (IWM) as Brand Licensing Manager. In 2016, he was appointed Head of Content for the redevelopment of the museum's Holocaust Galleries, leading the historical content and interpretation for the project.

The Holocaust Galleries opened at IWM London in October 2021 following a major redevelopment. Drawing on artefacts, survivor testimony and contemporary historical scholarship, the permanent exhibition examines the origins, course and legacy of the Holocaust.

The galleries received critical attention following their opening and were reviewed by publications including The Guardian and The Times.

In 2022, the Holocaust Galleries received the Museum and Heritage Award for Best Permanent Exhibition and a Gold Award in the Exhibits, Pavilions and Exhibitions category at the MUSE Design Awards.

Bulgin was subsequently appointed Head of Public History at IWM. In this role, he oversaw public engagement and interpretation relating to Holocaust history and twentieth-century conflict, while contributing to exhibitions, publications, lectures and documentary productions.

=== Broadcasting and public history ===
Bulgin has contributed to documentary productions as a presenter, historical adviser and on-screen expert. He appeared as an on-screen expert in the second series of Rise of the Nazis before serving as historical adviser for the programme's fourth series.

In 2023, Bulgin presented the BBC Two documentary How the Holocaust Began, which examined the origins and escalation of Nazi persecution and genocide. The programme was nominated for Best Specialist Factual Programme at the 2024 Broadcast Awards.

He subsequently appeared as an on-screen expert in D-Day: The Unheard Tapes and World War II with Tom Hanks, and served as historical adviser on What They Found, a documentary directed by Sam Mendes. What They Found was nominated for Best Specialist Factual at the 2026 British Academy Television Awards.

In 2026, Bulgin presented Auschwitz: Evolution of Terror for History Hit. The documentary received the Webby Award in the Documentary: Longform category.

In addition to his broadcasting work, Bulgin has written for publications including The Guardian, BBC History Magazine and Radio Times, and has contributed to public lectures, academic conferences and educational events on Holocaust history, historical memory and museum interpretation.

Bulgin serves on the international advisory board for the Swedish Holocaust Museum's permanent exhibition and on the international council of the Warsaw Ghetto Museum.

== Selected publications ==
- Bulgin, James. The Holocaust. Imperial War Museums, 2023.
- Haggith, Toby; Bulgin, James. Nuremberg. Imperial War Museums.
- Jaeger, Stephan; Bulgin, James. "The New Holocaust Galleries at the Imperial War Museum London: Conception, Design, Interpretation". Journal of Holocaust Research.
- Bulgin, James. "Curating the Experiential". In Maria M. Delgado, Michal Kobialka and Bryce Lease (eds.), Staging Difficult Pasts: Transnational Memory, Theatres and Museums. Routledge.

== Selected filmography ==
Year	Title	Role
2022	Rise of the Nazis (Series 2)	On-screen expert
2023	How the Holocaust Began	Presenter
2024	D-Day: The Unheard Tapes	On-screen expert
2025	World War II with Tom Hanks	On-screen expert
2025	What They Found	Historical adviser
2026	Auschwitz: Evolution of Terror	Presenter
