= Kvitsøy =

Kvitsøy may refer to:

== Places ==
- Kvitsøy Municipality, a municipality in Rogaland county, Norway
- Kvitsøy (island), an island in Kvitsøy Municipality in Rogaland county, Norway
- Kvitsøy Church, a church in Kvitsøy Municipality in Rogaland county, Norway

== Other ==
- Kvitsøy Tower, a transmission tower in Norway
- Kvitsøy Vessel Traffic Service Centre, a vessel traffic service and pilot dispatch station in Norway
