= Fedje =

Fedje may refer to:

== Places ==
- Fedje Municipality, a municipality in Vestland county, Norway
- Fedje (village), a village within Fedje Municipality in Vestland county, Norway
- Fedje (island), an island in Fedje Municipality in Vestland county, Norway
- Fedje Church, a church in Fedje Municipality in Vestland county, Norway

== People ==
- Bjørge Fedje (born 1985), a former Norwegian football goalkeeper

== Other ==
- Fedje Vessel Traffic Service Centre, a vessel traffic service and pilot station in Vestland county, Norway
- Fedje Heliport, Høgden, a heliport on the island of Fedje in Vestland county, Norway
