= Eskild Jensen Sr. =

Norwegian businessperson

Eskild Jensen (5 August 1876 – 1955) was a Norwegian businessperson.

He was born in Drammen as a son of bank treasurer Hans Jensen (1854–1934) and his wife Julie Larsen (1857–1906). In 1921 he married teacher Elizabeth Bacon Kobro (1889–1985). Their son Eskild Jensen (1925–2013) became director of the Norwegian Directorate of Public Roads.

He finished middle school in 1892 and Kristiania Commerce School in 1895. He was hired as manager in Nora Mineralvandfabrik in 1899, became office manager of Henri Nestlé's branch in Kristiania in 1901 and was the chief executive of De norske Melkefabrikker from 1915.

He was a national board member of the Federation of Norwegian Industries from 1924 to 1927, central board member of the Norwegian Employers' Confederation from 1926 to 1934 and board member of Oslo Handelsstands Forening from 1931 to 1933, the last year as vice chairman. He was also chairman of Forsikringsselskapet Dovre, board member of Oslo Port Authority from 1938, a supervisory council member of Elektrokemisk from 1927 (vice chairman from 1931) and a member of the Kristiania Stock Exchange arbitration court from 1932. His interests were mountaineering and rowing; he was an honorary member of Christiania RK. He died in 1955.
