= Olav Søfteland =

Norwegian civil servant (born 1937)

Olav Søfteland (born 8 November 1937) is a Norwegian civil servant.

Hailing from Søfteland in Os Municipality, he is a siv.ing. from the Norwegian Institute of Technology by education. In 1960 he was hired in the Norwegian Directorate of Public Roads, and was eventually promoted to director in 1992. Scheduled to retire as a pensioner in late 2007, he was forced to resign some months early due to the December 2006 Hanekleiv Tunnel scandal.

Political offices
| Preceded by Eskild Jensen | Director of the Norwegian Directorate of Public Roads; 1992–2007 | Succeeded by Terje Moe Gustavsen |
