= Terje Moe Gustavsen =

Norwegian politician (1954–2019)

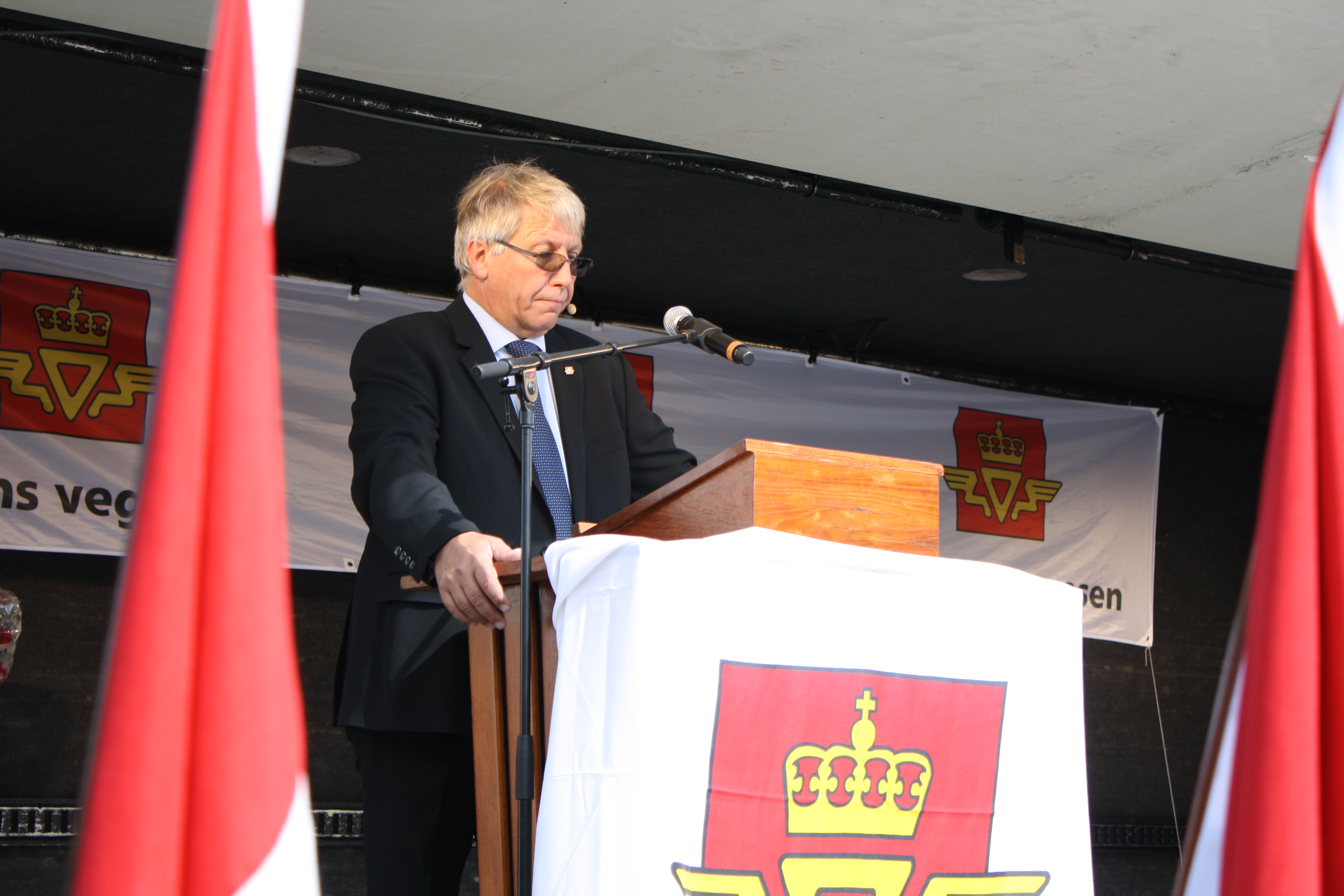
- Gustafson holding a speech in Trondheim

Director of the Norwegian Directorate of Public Roads
- In office 12 November 2007 – 4 May 2019
- Preceded by: Olav Søfteland
- Succeeded by: Ingrid Dahl Hovland

Minister of Transport and Communications
- In office 17 March 2000 – 19 October 2001
- Prime Minister: Jens Stoltenberg
- Preceded by: Dag Jostein Fjærvoll
- Succeeded by: Torild Skogsholm

Personal details
- Born: 20 October 1954 Larvik, Norway
- Died: 4 May 2019 (aged 64)
- Party: Labour Party

Terje Moe Gustavsen (20 October 1954 – 4 May 2019) was a Norwegian politician for the Labour Party and a civil servant.

== Biography ==
He was state secretary to the Prime Minister in 1997, and Minister of Transport and Communications 2000–2001 in the first cabinet Stoltenberg. Among others he became known for sacking the board of directors in the Norwegian State Railways in 2000.

In 2007 he was appointed director of the Norwegian Public Roads Administration. He died of a lung infection on 4 May 2019 at the age of 64.

Political offices
Preceded by Dag Jostein Fjærvoll	Norwegian Minister of Transport and Communications; 2000–2001	Succeeded by Torild Skogsholm
Civic offices
Preceded by Olav Søfteland	Director of the Norwegian Directorate of Public Roads; 2007–2019	Succeeded by Bjørne Grimsrud (acting)
