= Hanekleiv Tunnel =

Road tunnel in Vestfold, Norway

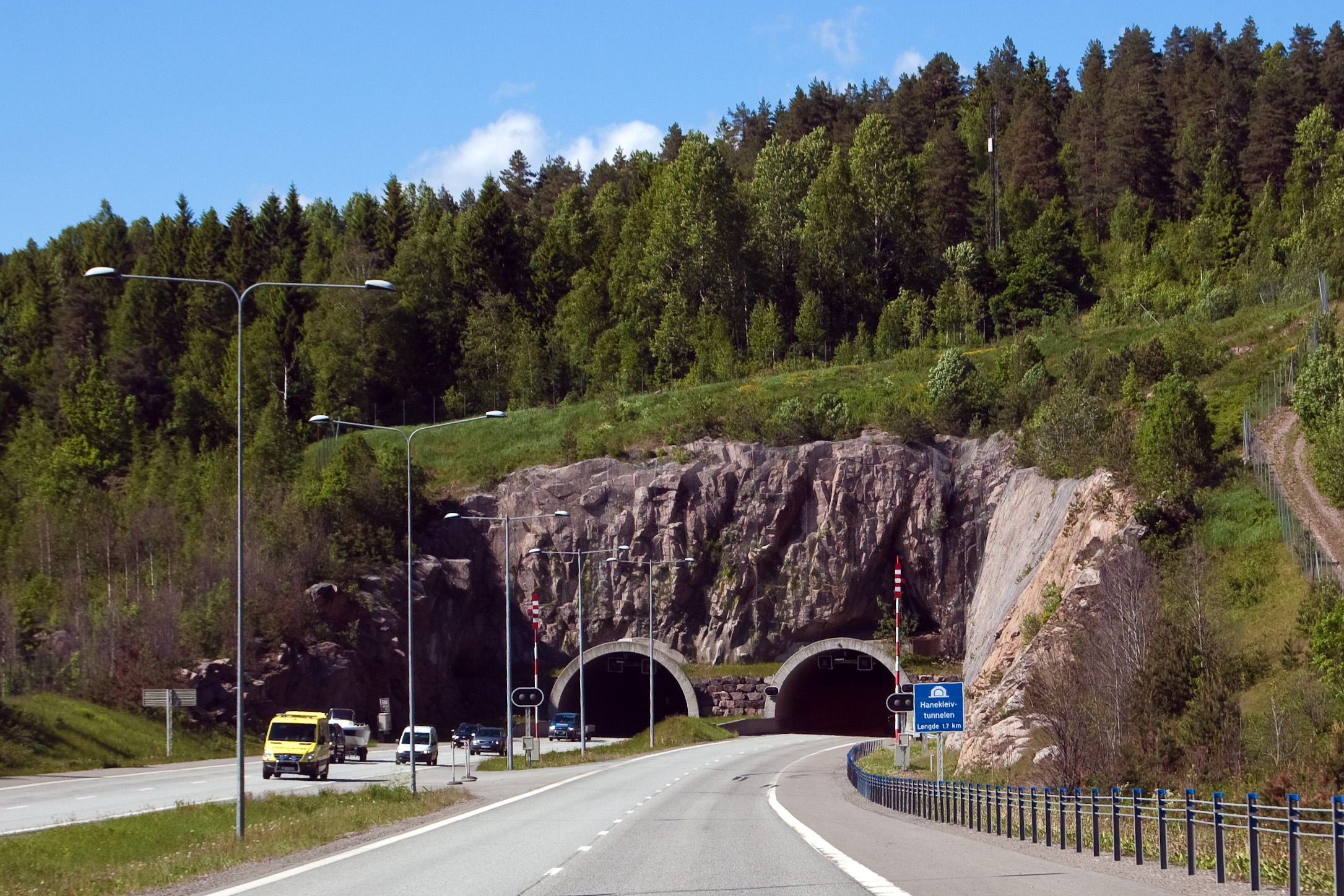
- View of the tunnel entrance
- Interactive map of Hanekleiv Tunnel

Overview
- Location: Vestfold, Norway
- Coordinates: 59°34′N 10°11′E
- Status: In use
- Route: E18

Operation
- Opened: 30 Oct 2001
- Operator: Statens vegvesen
- Traffic: Automotive
- Vehicles per day: 17,000

Technical
- Length: 1,765 metres (5,791 ft)
- No. of lanes: 4

The Hanekleiv Tunnel (Norwegian: Hanekleivtunnelen) is a road tunnel in Holmestrand Municipality in Vestfold county, Norway. The 1,765-metre (5,791 ft) long tunnel is one of seven along the European route E18 highway in Holmestrand Municipality. The tunnel became the centre of controversy on 25 December 2006 when part of the roof collapsed, and investigations revealed that several tunnels on the E18 highway through Vestfold were insufficiently secured. The tunnel was fully reopened on 30 August 2007.

== Technical details ==
The tunnel is 1,765 metres (5,791 ft) long and has two tubes, one for each direction of travel and each accommodating two lanes of highway. The tunnels were opened for traffic on 30 October 2001. The rock which the tunnel is built through is frequently unstable. To compensate for this, the tunnel roof and walls were reinforced at places with bolts and concrete injections, however the tunnel was not equipped with concrete walls throughout the length of the tunnel. The E18 tunnels in Vestfold had about 17,000 vehicles pass through them each day in 2007.

== History ==
=== 2006 incident ===
Late on Christmas Day 2006, about 200 cubic metres (7,100 cu ft) of rock fell from the ceiling of the southbound tunnel, onto the highway below. No cars were in the tunnel at the time, and there were no injuries. Debris continued to fall in the tunnel for up to three hours after the initial collapse. The debris covered a 25-metre (82 ft) long stretch of road, and at places the pile was almost as high as the tunnel ceiling.

The Southern Buskerud Police District was tasked with investigating the collapse. Neighbors close to the tunnel reported having noticed slight tremors and rumbles. Worries about the tunnel's safety had surfaced already during construction in 1997, when construction on the tunnel was halted so that additional security measures could be implemented.

=== 2007 incident ===
During repair work on 28 May 2007, two workers who were repairing and securing the tunnel sustained light injuries in a second incident. An unknown amount of concrete from the original securing of the tunnel fell over on the workers. Statens Vegvesen rejects that this was a new collapse of the tunnel, declaring the episode to be a work accident.

=== Investigation and repair ===
The investigation uncovered serious shortcomings in the safety of tunnels throughout Vestfold, not only the Hanekleiv Tunnel. Several other tunnels near the Hanekleiv tunnel were deemed to be safety risks, and had to be closed for further investigations and securing. The Progress Party demanded that the director of the Norwegian Directorate of Public Roads, Olav Søfteland, resign as a result.

The cost of adequate reinforcement of the Vestfold E18 tunnels was estimated to be 200 million kr, or about 33.2 million US dollars.

The closure of the E18 highway for tunnel repairs during the summer of 2007 lead to major traffic jams. Proposals to mitigate the road troubles included providing more trains and cutting the train fares by 50% on the Vestfoldbanen railway to encourage people to avoid the highway.
