= Kvitsøy Lighthouse =

Coastal lighthouse in Norway

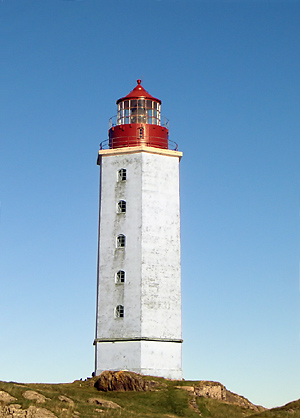
- View of the lighthouse
- Location: Kvitsøy, Kvitsøy Municipality, Norway
- Coordinates: 59°03′43.3″N 05°24′00.7″E

Tower
- Constructed: 1700
- Construction: stone tower
- Automated: 1969
- Height: 27 m (89 ft)
- Shape: octagonal tower with balcony and lantern
- Markings: white tower, red lantern
- Operator: Kvitsøy Municipality
- Heritage: cultural property

Light
- First lit: 1829
- Focal height: 45 m (148 ft)
- Lens: 2nd order Fresnel lens
- Intensity: 909,000 Candela
- Range: 18.5 nmi (34.3 km; 21.3 mi)
- Characteristic: Fl(4) W 40s

Kvitsøy Lighthouse (Norwegian: Kvitsøy fyr) is a coastal lighthouse and heritage building in Kvitsøy Municipality in Rogaland county, Norway. It is located on the west side of the village of Ydstebøhamn on the island of Kvitsøy. The lighthouse marks the entrance to the huge Boknafjorden, the main shipping route to the city of Stavanger, and inland Rogaland county. The first lighthouse at the site was established in 1700, and the present lighthouse was built in 1829. The lighthouse was automated in 1969, and has been a protected historic building since 1998.

== The 1829 tower ==
The 1829 lighthouse was 18 metres (59 ft) in height. The tower was extended by 7 metres (23 ft) in 1859 and it gained another 2 metres (6 ft 7 in) in height when a first order lens was installed in 1910. The present 27-metre (89 ft) tall lighthouse is an octagonal stone tower. There is a 2nd order Fresnel lens at the top of the tower. The building is painted white, with the lantern on the top painted red. Today, the light sits at an elevation of 45.2 metres (148 ft) above sea level. The light emits four white flashes every 40 seconds.

The lighthouse was automated and depopulated in 1969, and has been preserved as a protected historic building. Kvitsøy Lighthouse is the oldest stone tower lighthouse still in operation in Norway.

== The 1700 light ==
The first construction from 1700 was a pivotal "bucket light" fuelled by coal, which could be lifted about six metres above the ground. The lamp was lit from 20 August to 20 March during the night. The bucket contained 170 litres (37 imp gal; 45 US gal) of coal, and the annual consumption was about 70 metric tons (69 long tons). The operation of the light was funded by a toll system for ships passing Kvitsøy. A replica model of the bucket light from 1700 was installed in 2005 near the current lighthouse.

== See also ==
- Lighthouses in Norway
- List of lighthouses in Norway
