= Eskild Jensen =

Norwegian civil servant and politician

Eskild Jensen (28 April 1925 – 1 April 2013) was a Norwegian civil servant and politician for the Labour Party.

He was born in Vestre Aker as a son of executive Eskild Jensen Sr. (1876–1955) and teacher Elizabeth Kobro (1889–1985). In 1957 he married civil servant Inger Aarskog. He enrolled at Oslo Commerce School, but as the occupation of Norway by Nazi Germany commenced in the same year, Jensen soon prioritized to work in the Norwegian resistance movement. He distributed an illegal newspaper compiled from BBC radio reports; listening to these was also illegal. He was caught by Gestapo in 1942, tortured, and imprisoned in the concentration camps Grini and from May 1943 to 1945 Sachsenhausen.

After the war Jensen graduated in economics from the University of Oslo. In 1961 he was hired in the Ministry of Finance. He worked for the Norwegian Agency for Development Cooperation from 1962 to 1967 and 1969 to 1974. In 1974 he was appointed deputy under-secretary of state in the Ministry of Transport and Communications before serving as State Secretary in the Office of the Prime Minister from 1976 to 1980, as part of the Nordli's Cabinet. From 1980 to 1992 he served as director of the Norwegian Directorate of Public Roads.

Government offices
Preceded by Karl Olsen	Director of the Norwegian Directorate of Public Roads; 1980–1992	Succeeded by Olav Søfteland
