= Kvitsøy Vessel Traffic Service Centre =

Maritime traffic control centre in Norway

Coordinates: 59.0608°N 5.3997°E

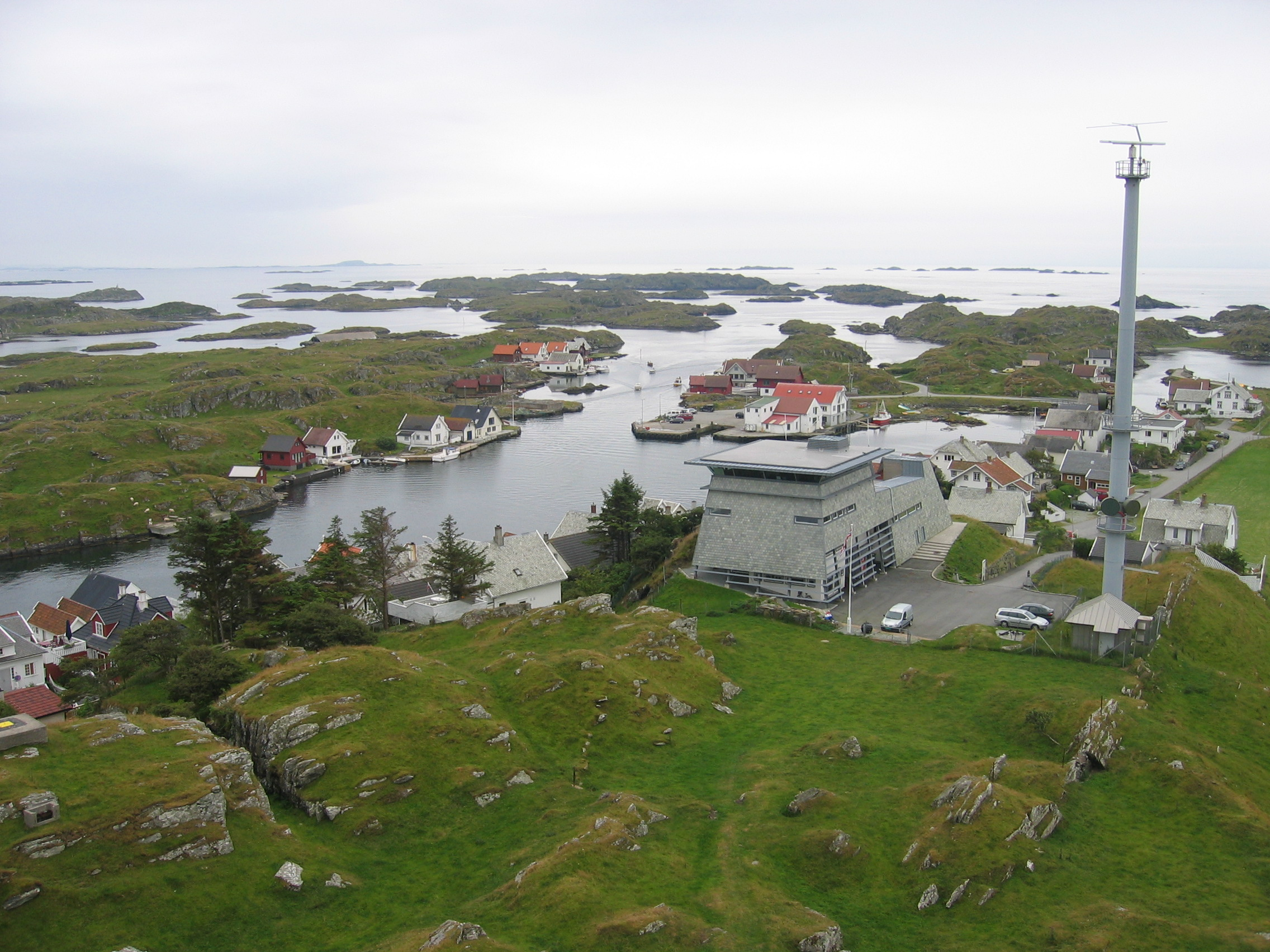
Kvitsøy VTS is located in the village of Ydstebøhavn on the island of Kvitsøy.

Kvitsøy Vessel Traffic Service Centre (Norwegian: Kvitsøy trafikksentral), commonly abbreviated Kvitsøy VTS, is a vessel traffic service and pilot dispatch station situated on the islands of Kvitsøy Municipality in Norway. Its main responsibility is handling traffic headed to the gas terminal at Kårstø, as well as the entire coast between Bømlafjorden and Jærens rev. This includes Boknafjorden.

The VTS opened on 3 January 2003, as the fourth in the country. It is the busiest, responsible for surveillance of about 300,000 sailings per year. Initially the station conducted remove piloting, but this was later discontinued. A major systems and radar upgrade took place in 2014. The facility is operated by the Norwegian Coastal Administration.

== History ==
Proposals for a VTS serving Boknafjorden and Rogaland were launched in the wake of the 1992 opening of Fedje Vessel Traffic Service Centre. Kvitsøy was mentioned early on as a potential site, although sites in Stavanger/Sandnes were also considered. Funding for preliminary work was granted by the government in 1997. Horten Vessel Traffic Service Centre, which serves the Oslofjord, was prioritized ahead of Kvitsøy and opened in 1999. The Coastal Administration announced in 2002 that they would centralize pilot dispatching and that Kvitsøy VTS would take over all such activities in Western Norway and Central Norway, including the dispatching taking place at Fedje VTS.

Rogaland has heavily trafficked sea lanes, with about 300,000 annual sailings and about ten annual accidents. The decisive reason for establishing a VTS in the area was the establishment of a gas terminal at Kårstø. It receives about six hundred annual gas tankers. The environmental impact of an accident was considered so high that increased precautions were needed. VTSes cover their operating expenses entirely through charging a safety fee on all commercial ships docking in the jurisdiction. Half the operating costs of Kvitsøy were placed on gas tankers to Kårstø, initially 74 øre per gross tonnage. All other ships were charged 19 øre per gross tonne. There were local reactions to this, as Rogaland ports would have a charge which for instance Bergen Port would not receive, as Fedje VTS was entirely financed through fees levied on tankers.

Construction of the facility cost 80 million Norwegian krone, including six radar stations. Kvitsøy VTS opened on 3 January 2003. At the time of opening the facility supported Automatic Identification System, but the system was not mandatory until 2008. Until then the VTS had several areas which fell into radar shadow. Annual operating costs were initially 12 million kroner per year.

Initially the VTS also housed a remove pilot station, allowing for the remote guidance of vessels from Kvitsøy. This was carried out by at least one of the traffic controllers being a certified pilot. The goal of the project was better use of resources. The trial was carried out for access to Norsk Hydro Karmøy, to Ryfylke and Dusavik in Stavanger Municipality. A 2005 report concluded that the remote piloting service was not able to cut costs or improve safety and was subsequently abolished.

The center received a full technical upgrade in 2014. The six magnetron radars were replaced with new solid-state radars, costing 50 million kroner. These allow for higher resolution combined with longer range. A 30-million upgrade was also carried out on the technical equipment at the station, allowing for a better overview and real-time updates on ship positions. Kvitsøy was the first of the Norwegian VTSes which received the new systems.

== Operations ==
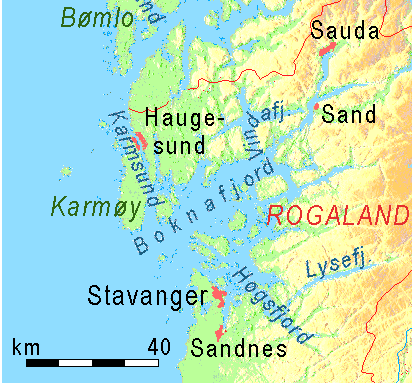
Approximate map of the area covered by Kvitsøy VTS

Kvitsøy VTS is one of five vessel traffic services in operation in Norway. Its jurisdiction covers the North Sea from Bømlafjorden in the north to Jærens Rev in the south. Kvitsøy is situated in the center of the mouth of Boknafjorden, throughout which the VTS has jurisdiction. A particular responsibility is tied to access to the gas terminal at Kårstø.

The center has three main duties. Firstly, it provides information services to vessels, such as the traffic situation, meteorological information and regulations. Secondly, it provides navigational assistant services to ships either on request or when deemed necessary by the staff. This often happens in severe weather conditions or in cases with technical difficulties with the ship. Thirdly, the VTS provides traffic organization to ensure a safe and orderly operation of the traffic. The center can draw on data from the Automatic Identification System, six local radars, meteorology, SafeSeaNet and video cameras. Server systems are redundant and include a backup at Horten VTS. The facility has an emergency generator which can produce power for at least four days.

As of 2013 Kvitsøy VTS cleared 130,160 sailings within the controlled waters. The center averts 25 to 30 possible accidents or near accidents per year. The VTS is financed through fees charged on the heavy shipping traffic which creates the need for the center. Kvitsøy VTS is part of the Norwegian Coastal Administration. In case of emergencies, search and rescue operations fall under the Joint Rescue Coordination Centre of Southern Norway.

The station is at any time staffed with two traffic controllers and a pilot dispatcher, the facility employees 25 people on the island, making it the second-largest employer after the municipality. Employees do shift work with ten days at work and then three weeks off. In addition, it carried out the responsibility for pilot dispatching in Central and Western Norway. Within the VTS area there are two pilot stations, situated at Tananger and Karmøy.
