= Ydstebøhamn =

Village in Kvitsøy Municipality, Norway

Ydstebøhamn Ystabøhamn
- Village
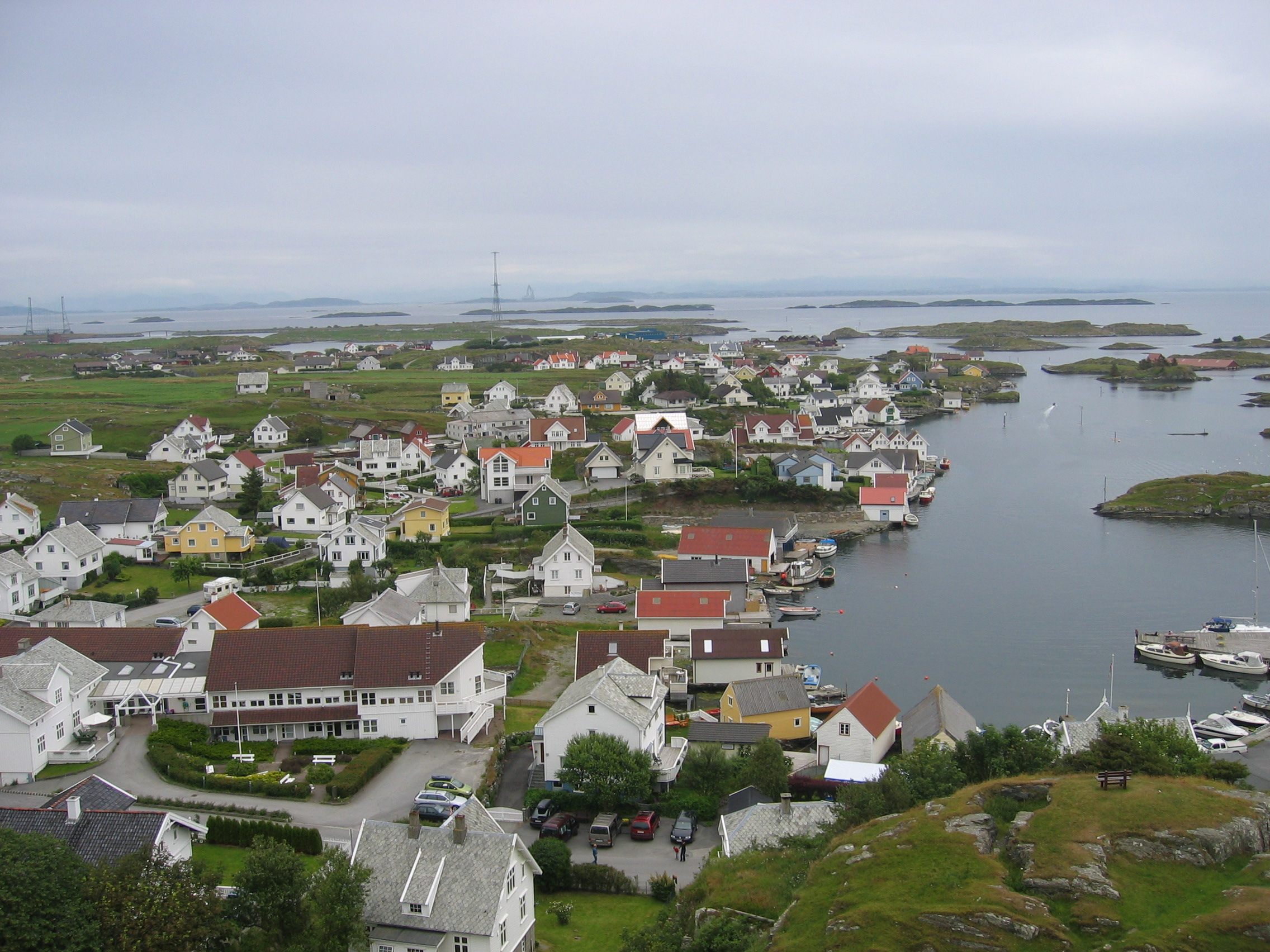
- View of the village
- Interactive map of Ydstebøhamn
- Coordinates: 59.06226°N 5.40244°E
- Country: Norway
- Region: Western Norway
- County: Rogaland
- District: Ryfylke
- Municipality: Kvitsøy Municipality

Area
  - Total: 0.41 km^{2} (0.16 sq mi)
- Elevation: 5 m (16 ft)

Population (2025)
  - Total: 424
  - Density: 1,034/km^{2} (2,680/sq mi)
- Time zone: UTC+01:00 (CET)
  - Summer (DST): UTC+02:00 (CEST)
- Post Code: 4180 Kvitsøy

Ydstebøhamn is the administrative centre of Kvitsøy Municipality in Rogaland county, Norway. The village is located on the southern shore of the island of Kvitsøy. The village has a ferry quay which receives regular ferries from the town of Skudeneshavn on the island of Karmøy across the Boknafjorden to the north, and to the village of Mekjarvik in Randaberg Municipality across the Kvitsøyfjorden on the mainland to the south. The planned Rogfast undersea tunnel will connect Kvitsøy island to the mainland to the north and south as part of the government's goal of providing a ferry-free European route E39 highway along the west coast of Norway.

The 0.41-square-kilometre (100-acre) village has a population (2025) of 424, giving the village a population density of 1,034 inhabitants per square kilometre (2,680/sq mi). This means that over 73% of the municipal population lives in the village.

The village is an important fishing port, especially focusing on shellfish. The Kvitsøy Lighthouse lies atop a small hill on the northwestern edge of the village.
