= Torild Skogsholm =

Norwegian politician

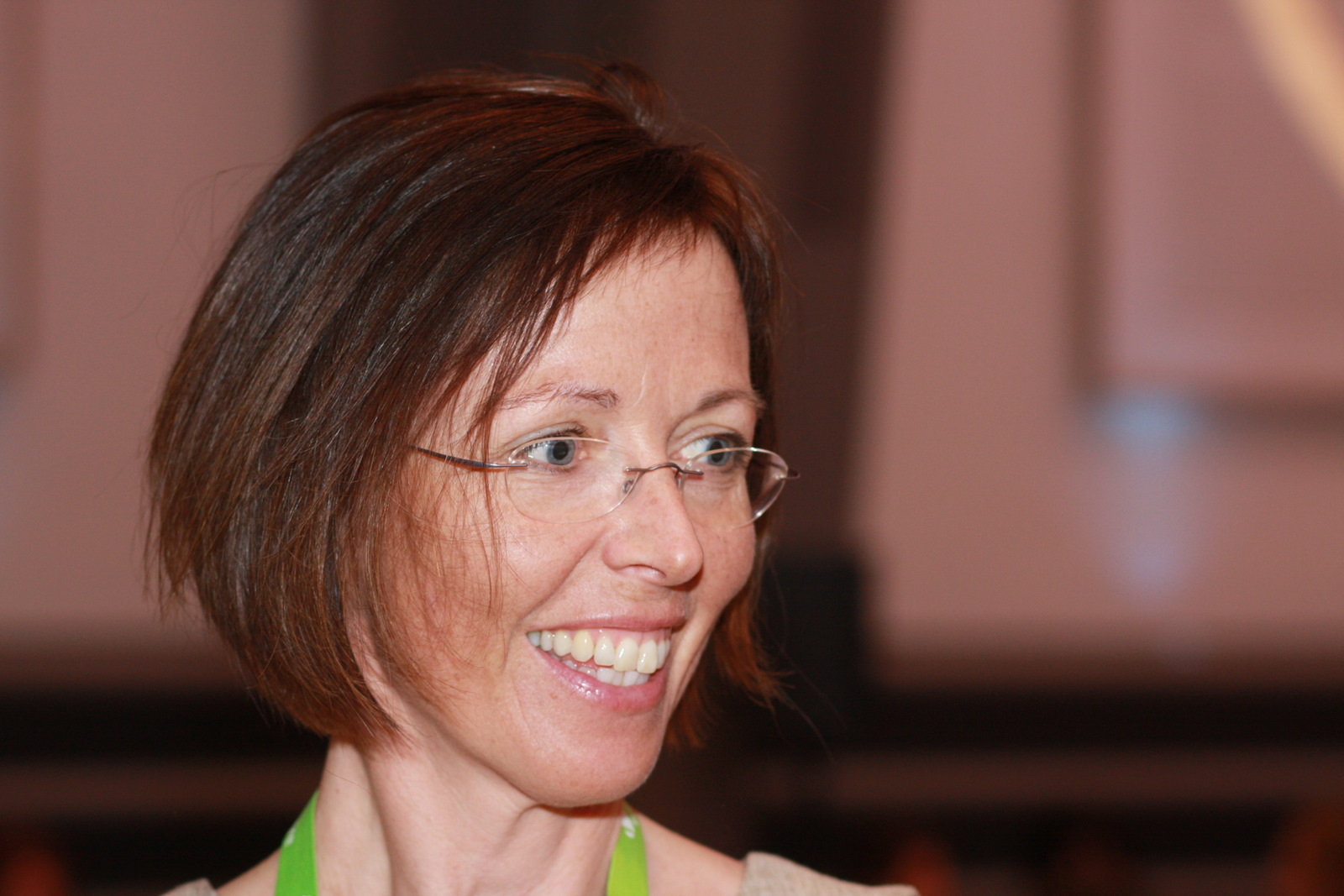
- Skogsholm in Stavanger (2009)

Minister of Transport and Communications
- In office 19 October 2001 – 17 October 2005
- Prime Minister: Kjell Magne Bondevik
- Preceded by: Terje Moe Gustavsen
- Succeeded by: Liv Signe Navarsete

Personal details
- Born: 18 October 1959 (age 66) Bodø, Norway
- Party: Liberal Party
- Profession: Politician

Torhild Skogsholm (born 18 October 1959 in Bodø) is a Norwegian politician (Liberal Party). She was Minister of Transport and Communications from 2001 to 2005. She is now the director of the Oslo tram company Oslo Sporvognsdrift.

Skogsholm graduated in economics (Cand.oecon.) at the University of Oslo, 1988.

Political offices
Preceded by Terje Moe Gustavsen	Norwegian Minister of Transport and Communications; 2001–2005	Succeeded by Liv Signe Navarsete
