= Fedje Heliport, Høgden =

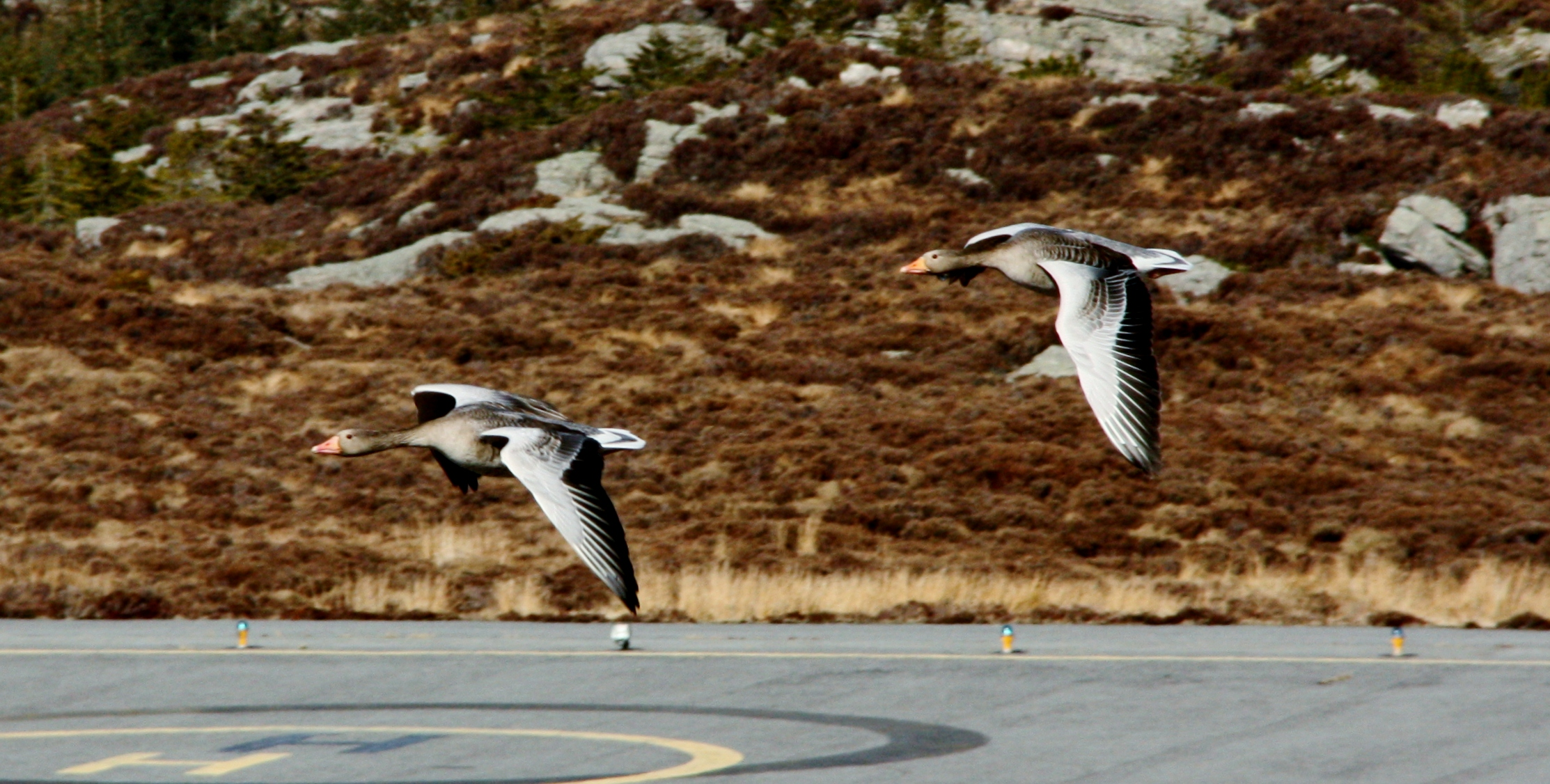
- IATA: none; ICAO: ENFJ

Summary
- Airport type: Private
- Owner: Fedje Municipality
- Serves: Fedje Municipality, Norway
- Coordinates: 60.7653392°N 4.7329448°E

Map
- Location within Norway

Helipads
Number	Length		Surface
Number	m	ft	Surface
			Asphalt

Fedje Heliport, Høgden (Norwegian: Fedje helikopterplass, Høgden; ICAO: ENFJ) is a municipal heliport situated on the island of Fedje in Fedje Municipality, in Vestland county, Norway. It is predominantly used to fly maritime pilots out of the pilot station at Fedje Vessel Traffic Service Centre. It is also used by air ambulances and as an emergency landing site for offshore helicopters. The heliport was built in 1994.

== History ==
Fedje Vessel Traffic Service Centre was established on 1 September 1992. As both a vessel traffic service and a pilot station, it controls and serves shipping traffic into two major oil terminals, Mongstad and Sture.

The Norwegian Coastal Administration had sporadically used helicopters to fly pilots out to major ships and installations. The oil terminal operators Statoil and Norsk Hydro pressed for this to become a permanent feature out of Fedje. A deal was therefore struck where helicopters would be used on a regular basis out of Fedje. Helicopters were used in harsh weather where it would be difficult or dangerous for the pilot boats to run out to the ships. To aid operations, Fedje Municipality built a heliport on the island and the Coastal Administration subcontracted flights to Helikopter Service.

Starting in January 1996, the helicopter service was made permanent and offered to any ship heading to Mongstad or Sture which exceeded a gross tonnage of 20,000. Costs for the helicopter were originally not included in the pilot's fee and were paid directly from the shipping company to Helikopter Service. A three-year contract for helicopter services for the pilots was issued in 1997. Three companies bid and Helikopter Service won. The helicopters would often fly low over the settlement, around the clock, causing complaints from local residents. From 2002 the contract was won by Lufttransport. This time the contract was extended and also included the responsibility for flying pilots out of Kvitsøy Vessel Traffic Service Centre.

== Operations ==
The primary use of the heliport is in conjunction with the pilot station at Fedje Vessel Traffic Service Centre. Transport of pilots to ships is offered to ships which exceed 30,000 gross tons with dangerous or polluting cargo and headed for the terminals at Mongstad or Sture. These flights are provided by Lufttransport using an AgustaWestland AW109 based at Bergen Airport, Flesland.

The heliport can also be used as an emergency landing site for offshore helicopters operating out of Flesland. It is also used by the Norwegian Air Ambulance when needed.
