= Kvitsøy Church =

Church in Rogaland, Norway

- Kvitsøy kirke
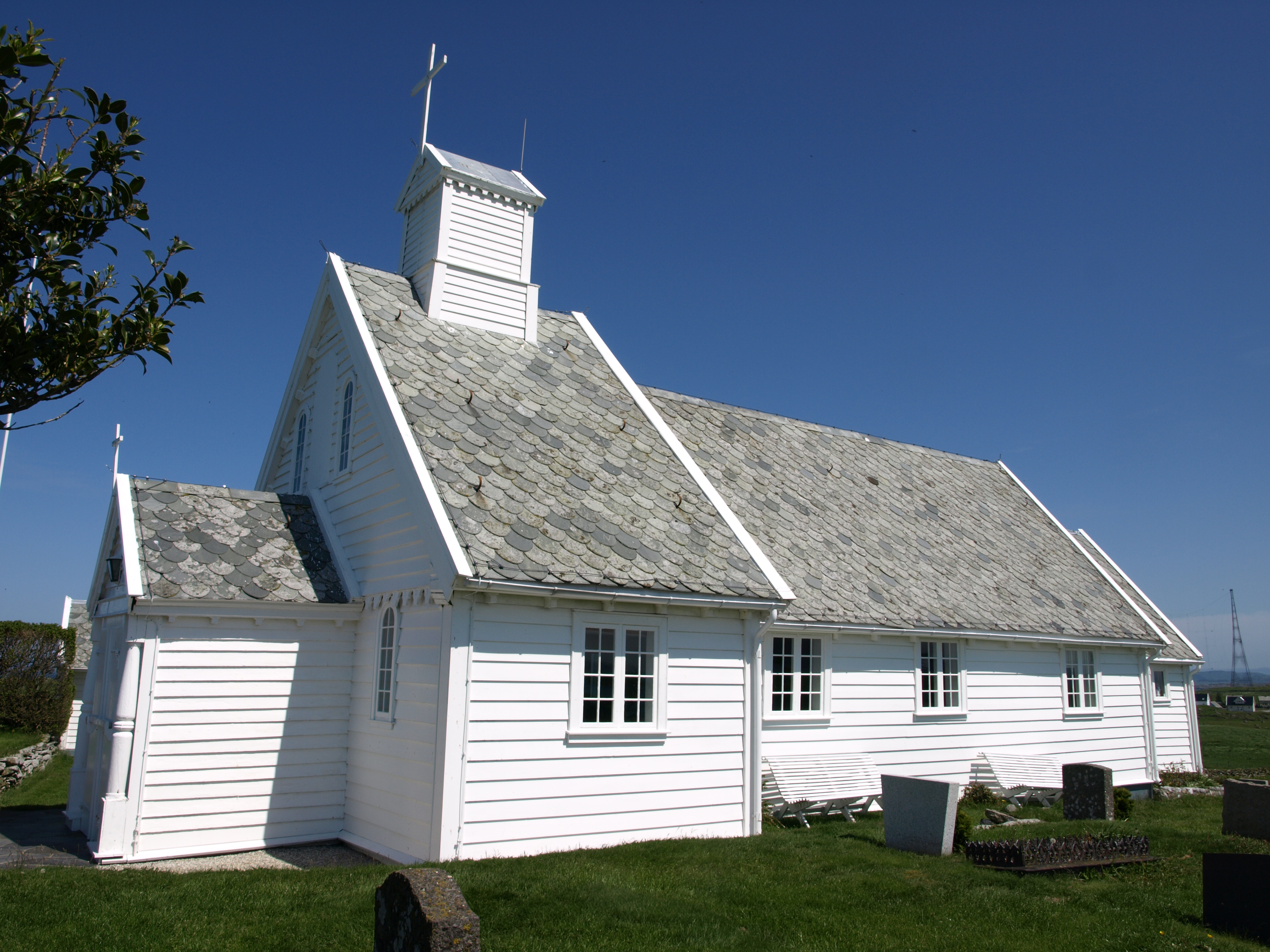
- View of the church
- Kvitsøy Church
- 59.06404°N 5.41637°E
- Location: Kvitsøy Municipality, Rogaland
- Country: Norway
- Denomination: Church of Norway
- Churchmanship: Evangelical Lutheran

History
- Status: Parish church
- Founded: 13th century
- Consecrated: c. 1620

Architecture
- Functional status: Active
- Architectural type: Long church
- Completed: c. 1620

Specifications
- Capacity: 150
- Materials: Wood

Administration
- Diocese: Stavanger bispedømme
- Deanery: Tungenes prosti
- Parish: Kvitsøy
- Norwegian Cultural Heritage Site
- Type: Church
- Status: Automatically protected
- ID: 84872

Kvitsøy Church (Norwegian: Kvitsøy kirke) is a parish church of the Church of Norway in Kvitsøy Municipality in Rogaland county, Norway. It is located just north of the village of Ydstebøhamn on the island of Kvitsøy. It is the church for the Kvitsøy parish which is part of the Tungenes prosti (deanery) in the Diocese of Stavanger. The small, white, wooden church was built in a long church design around the year 1620 using designs by an unknown architect. The church seats about 150 people.

== History ==
The earliest existing historical records of the church date back to the year 1293, but it was not new that year. Around 1620, the old medieval church was torn down and a new church was built on the same site. It is possible that some of the materials from the old church were reused in the new building. The altarpiece was new in 1620, but the baptismal font is dated back to around the year 1300, so it was used in the old church as well. The church has been remodeled and expanded since the original structure was built. In the 1950s, the original rosemåling decorations on the walls were discovered and restored.

== See also ==
- List of churches in Rogaland
