= Rogfast =

Subsea road tunnel in Rogaland, Norway

Rogfast Rogaland Fixed Link
- Interactive map of Rogfast; Rogaland Fixed Link

Overview
- Location: Rogaland, Norway
- Coordinates: 59°04′26″N 5°27′19″E
- Status: Under construction
- Route: E39
- Start: Randaberg Municipality
- End: Bokn Municipality

Operation
- Work began: 4 January 2018, halted October 2019, restart autumn 2021 (by Nov 2020 plan)
- Opens: 2033
- Operator: Norwegian Public Roads Administration
- Toll: yes

Technical
- Length: 27 kilometres (17 mi)
- Min elevation: −392 metres (−1,286 ft)

Rogaland Fixed Link (Rogaland fastforbindelse) or simply Rogfast is a project to construct a sub-sea road tunnel in Rogaland County, Norway, running between Randaberg Municipality (near the city of Stavanger) and Bokn Municipality, with a spur connecting to the islands of Kvitsøy Municipality. Once operational, the Boknafjord tunnel will become both the longest underwater road tunnel in the world, with a length of 27 kilometres (17 mi) and the deepest tunnel overall, with a maximum depth of 392 metres (1,286 ft) below sea level.

This will be a part of the main European route E39 highway along the west coast of Norway and it will link the cities of Kristiansand – Stavanger – Haugesund – Bergen. It is currently slated for a 2033 opening.

== Original plan: 2017 ==
The tunnel is planned as a 27-kilometre-long (17 mi) roadway which will run below the Boknafjord and Kvitsøyfjord. A 4.1-kilometre (2 9/16 mi) spur connection tunnel, called the Kvitsøy Tunnel, going to the island of Kvitsøy is included in the project.

The project was approved by the Storting (Norwegian Parliament) in May 2017, and it was planned to be finished in 2025–26. At that time, the project was projected to cost NOK16.8 billion (about €1.73 billion), with financing set at NOK11 billion from a loan to be paid by tolls, and 6 billion directly from the government.

Construction began in January 2018, with a ceremony for the initial rock blasting for one future entrance to the tunnel.

== Project halt and updated plans: 2019–2020 ==
In October 2019, due to cost overruns predicted in budgetary updates, the project was halted, with all plans for issuing of contracts (the project was being contracted out in stages) cancelled. In December 2019, the government requested a full review and revised budget update.

The first public awareness of higher costs had occurred in July 2019, when the Norwegian Public Roads Administration announced that it had received only two bids on the contract for the spur connection tunnel to Kvitsøy Municipality, the lowest of which was NOK1 billion (€102 million) higher than the amount approved by the Storting in 2017. In September 2019, the Kvitsøy bidding process was closed without granting a contract. An update in November 2019 suggested that the earliest possible completion of the project would be in 2029.

By April 2020, the Norwegian Public Roads Administration's revised update estimated that the cost of the total project (including the Kvitsøy spur) had increased to NOK25 billion (€2.3 billion), an increase of NOK6.4 billion, but stated it believed there were savings of up to NOK4 billion to be found before it would submit a revised funding request to the government.

In October 2020, the Norwegian Public Roads Administration brought its revised plan to the government for consideration. Included was the intention to divide the entire project into four contracts, with the comprehensive bidding process for the first three contracts to start in 2021, for work to commence in late 2021 and early 2022. These three contracts will cover: the Kvitsøy tunnel segment; the long tunnel segment building north from Randaberg Municipality; and the long tunnel segment building south from Bokn Municipality. The fourth contract, completing the interchange tunnels connecting the Kvitsøy tunnel to the other two, will go to bidding when the Kvitsøy tunnel is completed. The interconnection, allowing the Rogfast to open, is now forecast to be completed in 2031.

In late November 2020, the Norwegian Public Roads Administration received new approval from the government for a revised budget of NOK24.8 billion (€2.31 billion) (contrary to the April 2020 "hope" of reducing it to NOK21 billion), an increase of roughly NOK8 billion from the budget approved in 2017. The government agreed to increase its direct contribution to NOK9.9 billion, with the remaining NOK14.9 billion to be financed by borrowing that would be repaid by tolls charged to vehicles using the Rogfast; this constituted matching NOK3.9 billion increases on both the government contribution and the toll-based loan.

As of March 2022 the estimated opening date has further been delayed to 2033, with more recent delays due to gaining successful contractor bids.

On December 12, 2022, the first main contract was signed with Skanska for the construction of the northern part of the 26.7-kilometer tunnel, valued at nearly 5 billion NOK (€490 million). The second main contract, signed on January 9, 2023, with Implenia Norge, focuses on the southern part of the tunnel, amounting to 4 billion NOK (€400 million). The final main contract, signed June 11, 2024, also with Implenia/Stangeland for the middle part of the tunnel is valued at 6.2 billion NOK (€610 million).

As of November 2023, in the Kvitsøy tunnel, contractor Hæhre/Risa completed the blasting phase, conducting around 800 blasts over 3.5 kilometers, and initiated groundwork for water and sewage systems, targeting completion of their contract by spring/summer 2024. In Mekjarvik, Implenia/Stangeland has excavated 1.3 kilometers of the tunnel, with the aim to reach daylight by early 2024. Construction has also commenced at the other end.

== Name ==
The name Rogfast is an abbreviation for the Norwegian name Rogaland fastforbindelse which is translated to English as the "Rogaland fixed link". Boknafjord tunnel refers to the Boknafjord and Kvitsøy tunnel refers to the island and the municipality of the same name.

== See also ==
- List of longest tunnels
