= Ingrid Dahl Hovland =

Norwegian civil servant (born 1959)

- Hovland in 2024

Director of the Norwegian Directorate of Public Roads
- Incumbent
- Assumed office 11 oktober 2019
- Preceded by: Terje Moe Gustavsen

Personal details
- Born: 24 February 1959 (age 67) Årdal, Norway

Ingrid Dahl Hovland (born 1959) is a Norwegian civil servant, and director of the Norwegian Roads Directorate.

She was born in Årdal Municipality. In her early career she was, among others, construction site leader at the Nordby Tunnel.

Hovland was hired as the inaugural chief executive officer of Nye Veier in 2015. In 2019 she moved on to become director of the Norwegian Roads Directorate.

New post	Chief executive officer of Nye Veier; 2015–2019	Succeeded by Anette Aanesland
Preceded by Terje Moe Gustavsen	Director of the Norwegian Roads Directorate; 2019–	Incumbent
