= Kvitsøy Tower =

Former medium wave transmitter in Norway

Coordinates: 59°03′58″N 5°26′20″E

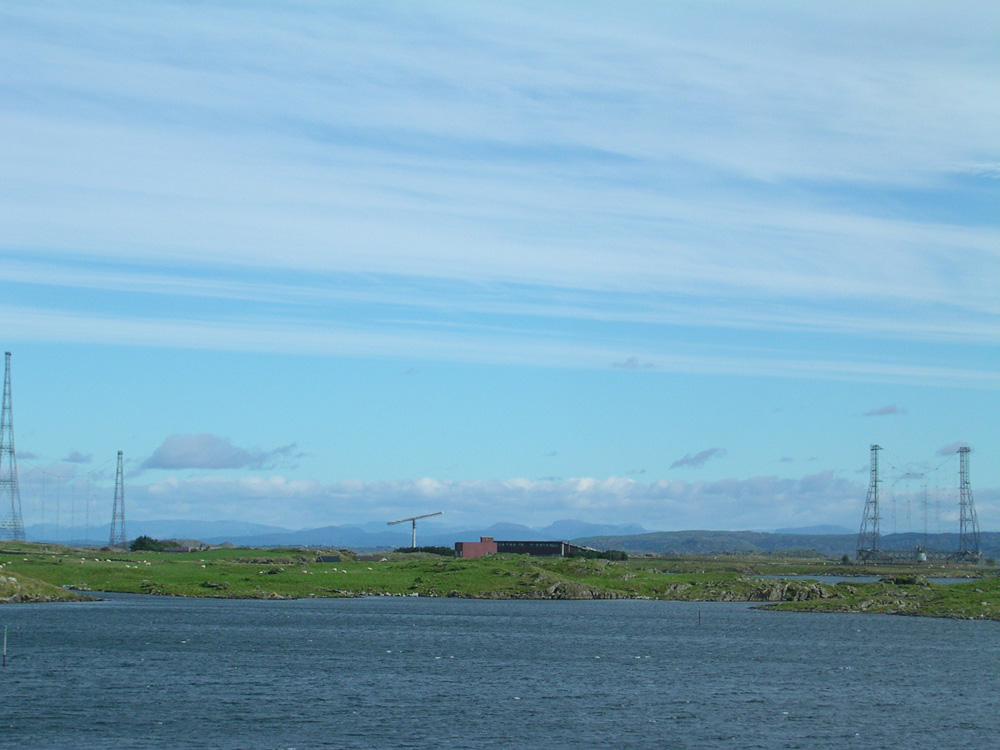
Radio masts at Kvitsøy, Norway

Kvitsøy Tower is the name for the aerial tower of the 1200-kilowatt transmitter of the broadcasting company of Norway for the frequency 1314 kHz, which was built in 1981/82. Kvitsøy-Tower was a 117.5 metres high, free standing centre-fed half-wave antenna constructed of a grounded steel framework. Horizontal crossbars were located at its top and at a height of 67.5 metres above ground to support the cables for a medium wave aerial, which were strung parallel to the tower. The vertical cables hanging from the lower crossbar were fixed to the ground with anchors. It was located in Kvitsøy Municipality.

The Norwegian public broadcaster NRK switched off the Kvitsøy transmitter at 22:00 UTC on Friday June 30, 2006. For years, the station had been heard fairly reliably at night by DX'ers along the Atlantic Coast of North America making it one of the easiest European stations to hear. The mast was demolished on 31 May 2012.

== See also ==
- List of towers
