= Bjørge Fedje =

Norwegian footballer and coach

Personal information
- Date of birth: 1985 (age 40–41)
- Position: Goalkeeper

Senior career*
Years	Team	Apps	(Gls)
- Sogndal Fotball
2005–2006	Årdal FK		
2006–2007	Manglerud Star		
2007	Eikefjord IL		
2007	MS Oslo		

Managerial career
- 2007: MS Oslo (Goalkeeping coach)
- 2008–: FK Mandalskameratene (Goalkeeping coach)
- * Club domestic league appearances and goals

Bjørge Fedje (born 1985) is a former Norwegian football goalkeeper, now a goalkeeping coach for Arendal Fotball.

He previously played for local club Sogndal Fotball, where he appeared in three Norwegian Premier games in 2004. He then joined Årdal FK, but left the club in 2006. In 2006, he was on trial at Cambridge United. He joined second-tier team Manglerud Star, and then went to Eikefjord IL in 2007 but returned to MS Oslo later that year as a player and goalkeeping coach. In 2008, he joined FK Mandalskameratene as their new goalkeeping coach.
