= De norske Melkefabrikker =

Norwegian condensed milk company

De Norske Melkefabrikker
- Company type: Aksjeselskap
- Industry: Food
- Founded: 1915
- Fate: Renamed A/S Nestlé (1964)
- Headquarters: Norway
- Products: Condensed milk
- Parent: Nestlé

De Norske Melkefabrikker (Norwegian for "The Norwegian Milk Factories") was a Norwegian subsidiary of Nestlé, started in 1915, which gathered the Norwegian milk factories at Hamar, Kapp, Sandesund near Sarpsborg, and Botne near Holmestrand into a single Norwegian joint-stock company controlled by Nestlé.

The factories produced mainly condensed milk under the Viking Melk brand, a well-known trademark that Nestlé had first acquired by buying the Viking Melk factory at Kapp in 1898. The company changed its name to A/S Nestlé in 1964.
