= Fedje Vessel Traffic Service Centre =

Norwegian vessel traffic service

Coordinates: 60.7801°N 4.6981°E

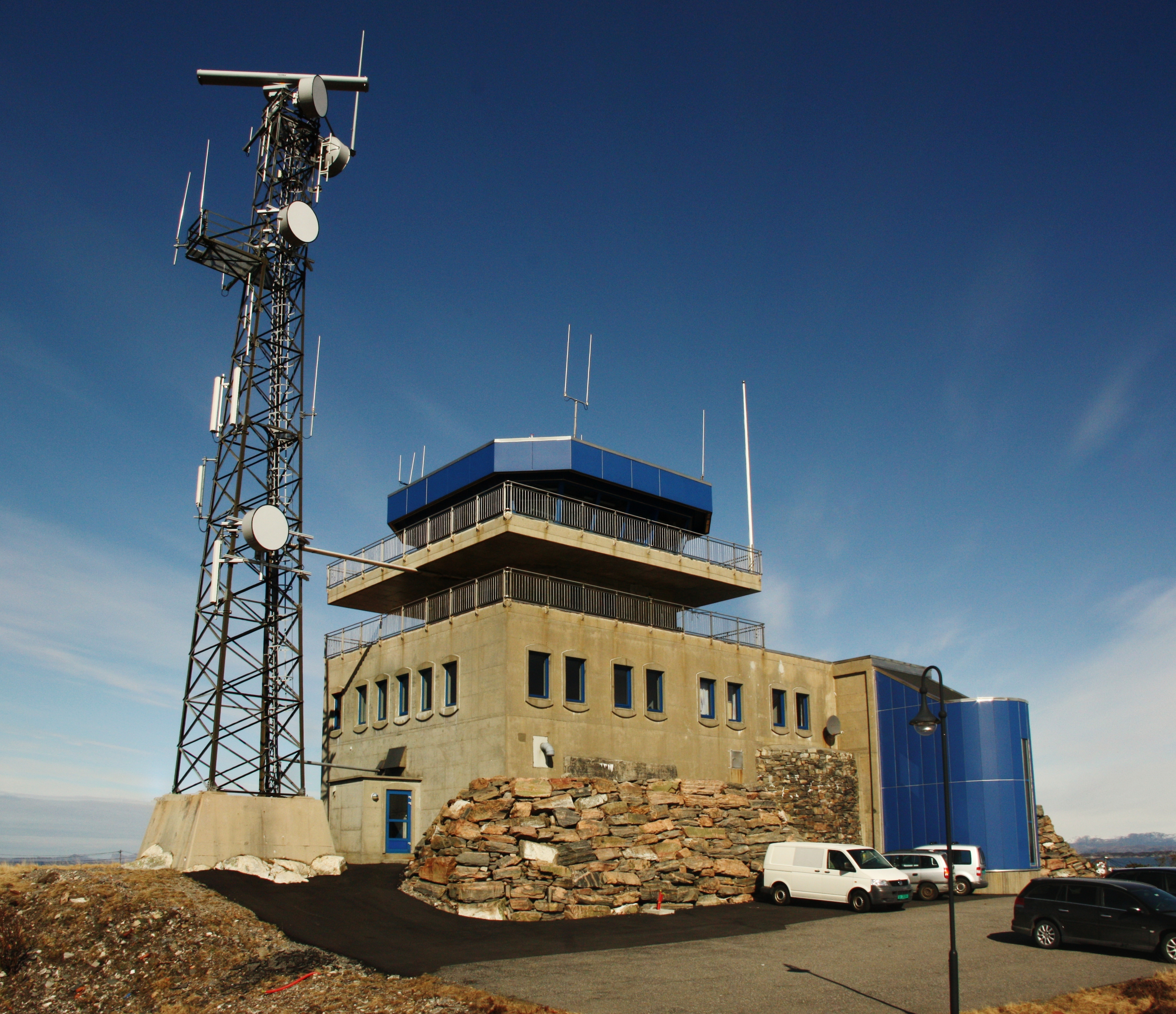
Fedje VTS

Fedje Vessel Traffic Service Centre (Norwegian: Fedje trafikksentral), commonly abbreviated Fedje VTS, is a vessel traffic service and pilot station situated on the island of Fedje in Fedje Municipality, Norway. Its main responsibility is handling traffic headed to the offshore bases and refineries at Sture and Mongstad.

Piloting has been provided out of Fedje since time immemorial. This gradually became more organized, and from 1953 a hut was erected on the site of the current station. It was rebuilt in 1977, and then demolished and rebuilt again in 1992, this time opening as Norway's second VTS. Since 1994 the nearby Fedje Heliport, Høgden has been used to fly pilots to ships.

== History ==
Pilots have been employed along the coast of Norway since prehistory. In early times pilots had a competitive regime, where several candidates would race to reach a potential ship to collect the fee. Because of the hard competition, pilots would often fare out in too harsh conditions, frequently meeting an early death. However, the occupation was amongst the best paid in rural areas. Fedje is located along the main sea lane from the north to Bergen and therefore has been an important base for pilots. From 1720 piloting exams were introduced. During the 19th century there were often several pilots working out of Fedje. The pilots owned their own boats and hired an assistant, often their own sons, to operate the boat for them.

From 1899 the competitive pilot system was abolished and a new piloting law was introduced, establishing the Naval Pilot Authority. By 1910 there was only one pilot left at Fedje. This dramatically changed during the First World War, when series of British convoys traveled up and down the coast. Soon there were four pilots stationed at Fedje, and when needed experienced fishermen were also used. After the end of the war in 1918 things settled down and from 1920 there was only a single pilot working out of Fedje. This was increased to two in 1927. During the 1930s each of them had an average thirty missions per year. Pilots were required to have a house with a good view of the open sea towards the direction of the sea lane. For this reason placing houses at Hesthaugen was popular amongst the pilots. There was a new boom in pilot demand during the Second World War, with an average 69 missions per year.

During the war the Luftwaffe installed a radar mast at Hesthaugen, on the current site of the center. It was predominantly used to guide German aircraft to Herdla Airport. Two assistants were hired in the late 1940s; these were to walk on Hesthaugen spotting for vessels. This was supplemented through the use of radio, which allowed ships to communicate the need for pilot via telegram. In 1953, a hut for the pilots was built at the site of wartime radar station. Three years later a proper pilot's vessel was procured. Traffic increased during the 1970s, especially due to the establishment of Mongstad Refinery. Two other contributing factors were vessels traveling to Årdal, Høyanger and Bremanger. A larger station was therefore erected in 1977, on the same location. By 1983 the station had six pilots, eight shippers and two vessels.

The need for a vessel traffic service arose with the construction of the bases and refineries at Mongstad and Sture. This created a situation with 2,500 annual shiploads of oil combined with 20,000 annual ships in other traffic. The national authorities approved the center in 1990, allowing construction to start in June 1991. This included construction of three radars, one on the island of Fedje, one at Vikingneset on the island of Byrknesøyna in Gulen Municipality, and one on Marøy. Fedje VTS cost 31 million Norwegian krone and was funded entirely by the operators of the bases, Statoil and Norsk Hydro.

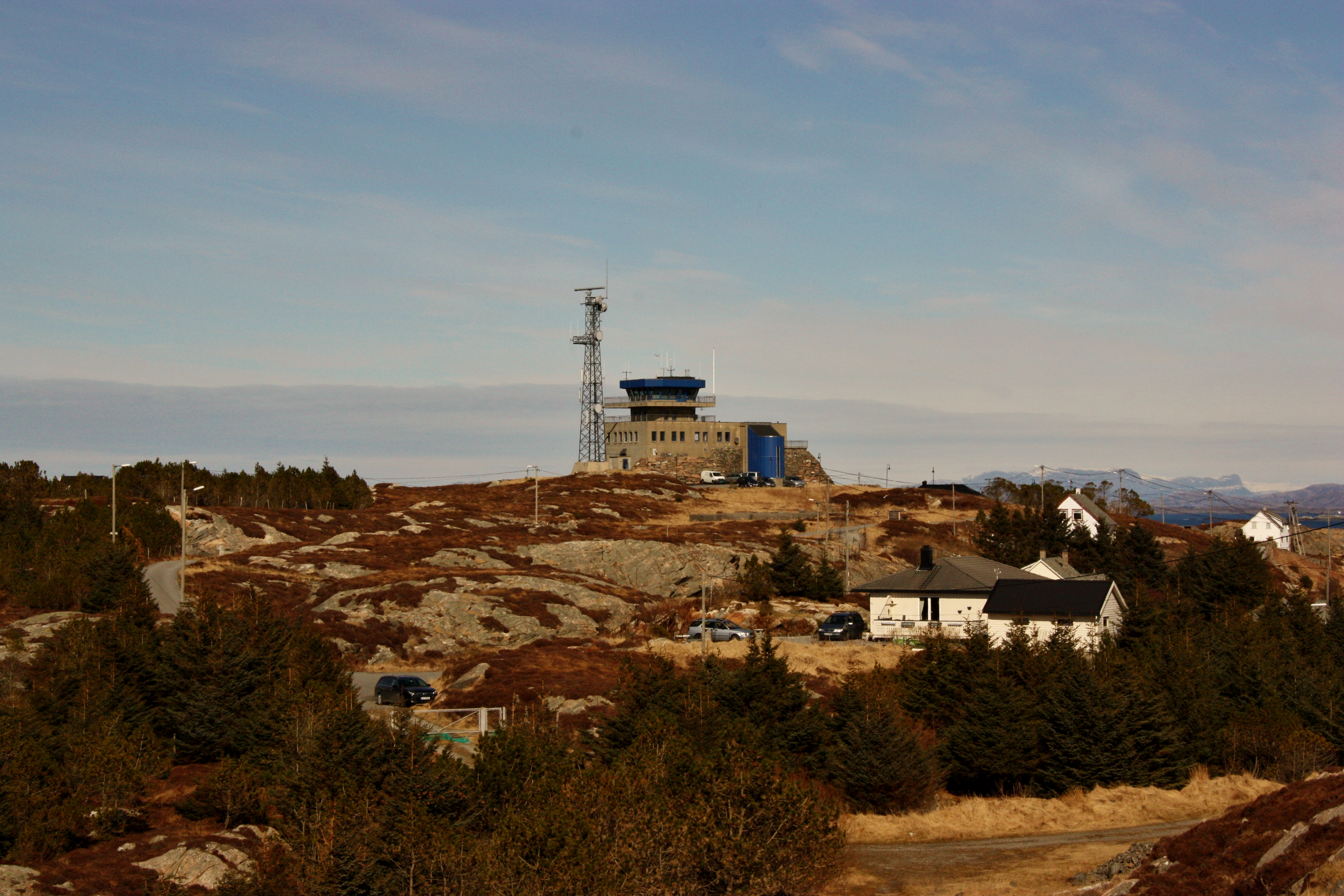
The VTS is located in the Hesthaugen area of Fedje

The facility opened on 1 September 1992, as the second VTS in Norway. The establishment created twelve new jobs. Starting in September 1994 a trial service for using helicopters to fly the pilots to larger ships was introduced. To facilitate this, Fedje Municipality established a heliport on the island. The same year the VTS was given the responsibility for administering the seas around three oil platforms—Statfjord, Gullfaks and Troll.

Originally Fedje was responsible for its own pilot dispatching. In 2002 the Coastal Administration carried out a centralization of the dispatching and relocated it to the newly established Kvitsøy Vessel Traffic Service Centre. However, Fedje VTS retained an around-the-clock two-man staff. A major accident took place within the jurisdiction of the center on 12 January 2007, when the Cypriot cargo vessel MV Server went aground on the south side of Fedje. Fedje received 40 million kroner in 2009 to upgrade its computer and radar equipment. Unlike other investments and operating costs, these were paid for directly by the state instead of through shipping fees.

Trials started in 2013 with the VTS also supervising the access to Bergen from the south. In particular Vatlestraumen and Hjelteskjæret were critical points where multiple sea lanes meet. Due to surplus working capacity amongst the two people on duty, this could be carried out without additional cost. The boathouse underwent a major upgrade in 2014, receiving a dormitory section and a new workshop. The same year a new computer system was installed along with upgrades to the radars. This allows for additional accuracy and better integrates multi-source real-time data. Should the Stad Ship Tunnel be completed, traffic organization through the tunnel will be handled by Fedje VTS.

== Operations ==
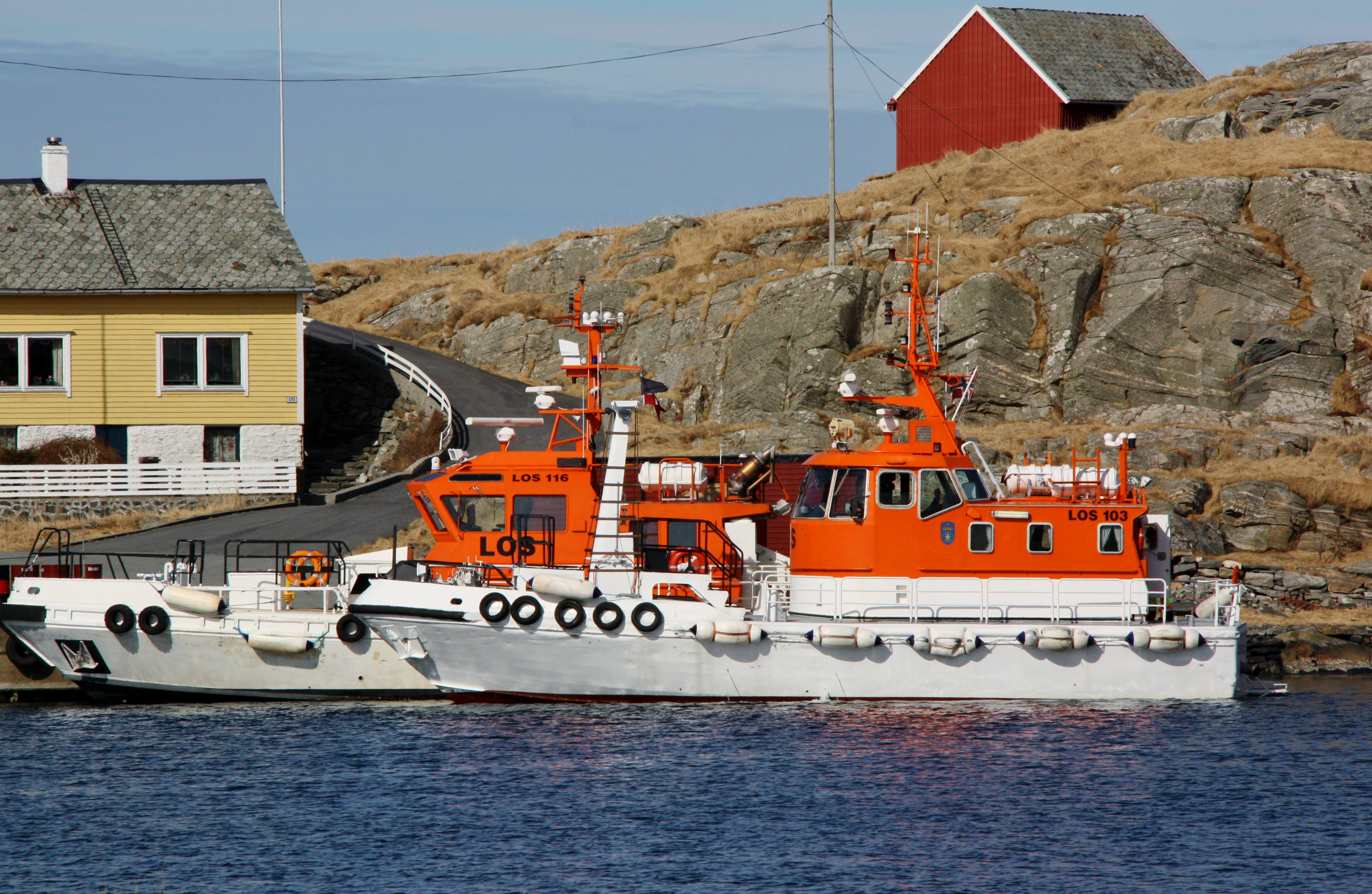
The two pilot boats stations at Fedje

Fedje VTS is one of five vessel traffic services in operation in Norway. Its jurisdiction covers the North Sea from Sognesjøen in the north to Hjeltefjorden at Sture in the south. It is predominantly concerned with the sea lanes leading to Mongstad and Sture. As of 2009, there were about 50,000 annual boats in the controlled waters. The VTS is financed through fees charged on the heavy shipping traffic which creates the need for the center. Fedje VTS is part of the Norwegian Coastal Administration. In case of emergencies, search and rescue operations fall under the Joint Rescue Coordination Centre of Southern Norway.

The center has three main duties. Firstly, it provides information services to vessels, such as the traffic situation, meteorological information and regulations. Secondly, it provides navigational assistant services to ships either on request or when deemed necessary by the staff. This often happens in severe weather conditions or in case of technical difficulties with a ship. Thirdly, the VTS provides traffic organization to ensure a safe and orderly operation of the traffic. The center can draw on data from the Automatic Identification System, local radar, meteorology, SafeSeaNet and video cameras.

The pilot station is integrated into the VTS. It covers the busiest area in Norway, with about 9,000 annual missions, or twenty percent of the national figures. There are eleven pilots working out of the station. These work 12 hours a day, with every other week off. The station has two pilot boats and eleven skippers for these. The skippers work 12 hour shifts one week at a time. Both pilots and skippers are often from off-island and therefore the boathouse has been equipped with living accommodation. The dormitory is also often used by pilots from other parts of the country which are in transit after ending of previous mission.

== Bibliography ==
- Brekke, Nils Georg; Skaar, Ronny B. (1995). Kulturhistorisk vegvisar Fedje (in Norwegian). Fedje: Fedje Municipality. ISBN 82-7326-034-8.
- Ministry of Fisheries (1996). St.meld. no. 43 1995–96: Lostjenesten og losgebyrene – en bred beskrivelse (in Norwegian).
- Ministry of Justice and the Police. The Norwegian Search and Rescue Service. Archived from the original on 8 October 2006.
- Norwegian Official Report (1999). Det nye Kystverket (in Norwegian).
- Skogseth, Arvid (1997). Fedje og folket (in Norwegian). Fedje: Fedje Municipality. ISBN 82-994432-0-2.
- Tangen, Oskar (1984). Bygdebok for Fedje (in Norwegian). Fedje: Fedje Bygdeboknemnd. ISBN 82-7101-107-3.
