= Kvitsøy Municipality =

Municipality in Rogaland, Norway

Kvitsøy Municipality Kvitsøy kommune
- Municipality
- Kvitingsø herred (historic name)
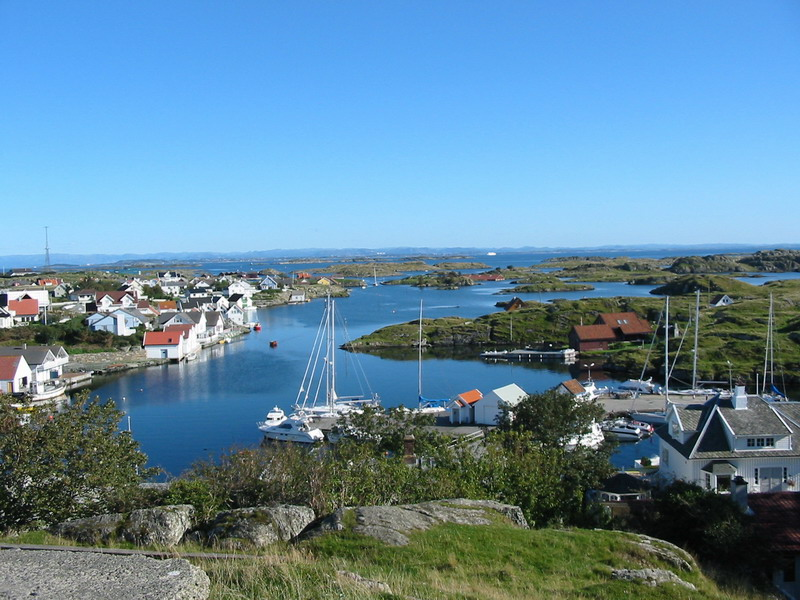
- View of Ydstebøhamn

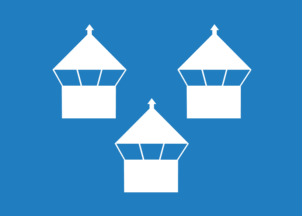
- Flag Coat of arms

- Rogaland within Norway

- Kvitsøy within Rogaland
- Coordinates: 59°03′44″N 05°24′42″E
- Country: Norway
- County: Rogaland
- District: Ryfylke
- Established: 1 Jan 1923
  - Preceded by: Mosterøy Municipality
- Administrative centre: Ydstebøhamn

Government
  - Mayor (2023): Kjell André Nordbø (LL)

Area
  - Total: 6.28 km^{2} (2.42 sq mi)
  - Land: 6.27 km^{2} (2.42 sq mi)
  - Water: 0.01 km^{2} (0.0039 sq mi) 0.2%
  - Rank: #357 in Norway
- Highest elevation: 27.97 m (91.8 ft)

Population (2026)
  - Total: 579
  - Rank: #350 in Norway
  - Density: 92.2/km^{2} (239/sq mi)
  - Change (10 years): ▲ +10.5%
- Demonym: Kvitsøybu

Official language
  - Norwegian form: Neutral
- Time zone: UTC+01:00 (CET)
  - Summer (DST): UTC+02:00 (CEST)
- ISO 3166 code: NO-1144
- Website: Official website

Kvitsøy is an island municipality in Rogaland county, Norway. At only 6.28-square-kilometre (1,550-acre), it is the smallest municipality in Norway by area and one of the smallest by population. Kvitsøy Municipality is located in the traditional district of Ryfylke. The administrative centre of the municipality is the village of Ydstebøhamn on the island of Kvitsøy. The municipality is an archipelago located at the entrance to the large Boknafjorden. It sits about 2 nautical miles (3.7 km; 2.3 mi) northwest of the mainland Stavanger peninsula.

The Rogfast tunnel system is currently being built during the 2020s to connect Kvitsøy Municipality to the mainland road network via the European route E39 highway.

The 6.28-square-kilometre (2.42 sq mi) municipality is the 357th largest by area out of the 357 municipalities in Norway, making it the smallest in the nation. Kvitsøy Municipality is the 350th most populous municipality in Norway with a population of 579. The municipality's population density is 92.2 inhabitants per square kilometre (239/sq mi) and its population has increased by 10.5% over the previous 10-year period.

== General information ==
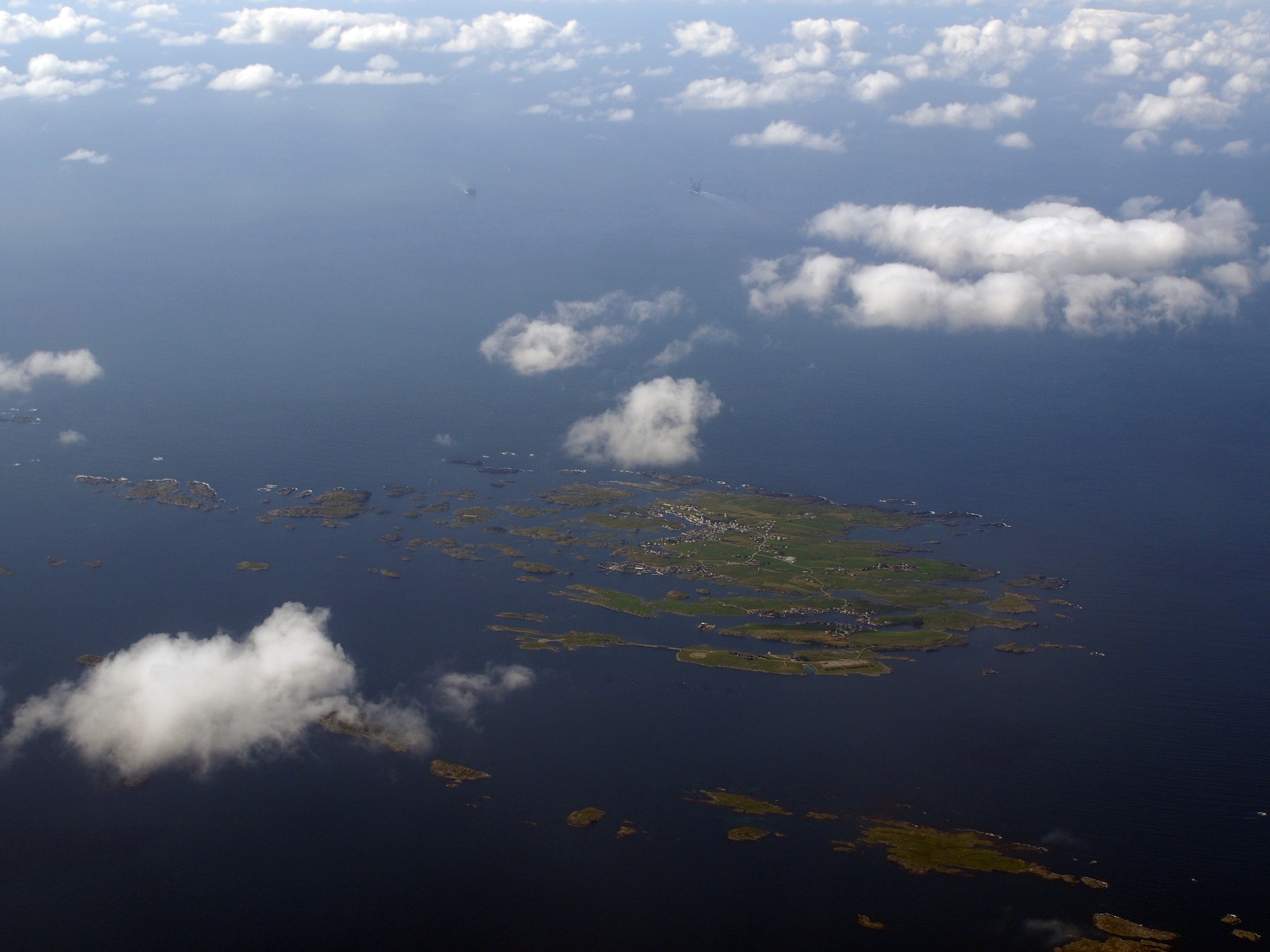
Aerial view of the municipality

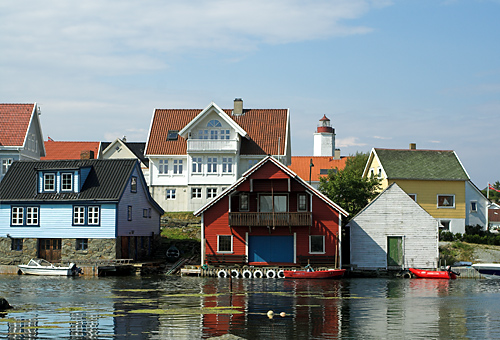
Houses along the bay near Ydstebøhavn

The islands of Kvitsøy were established as a municipality on 1 January 1923 when they were separated from the large Mosterøy Municipality. Initially, the municipality had 581 residents. The municipal boundaries have not changed since that time.

=== Name ===
The municipality (originally the parish) is named after the Kvitsøy islands (Old Norse: Hvítingsøyjar) since the islands make up the whole parish/municipality. The first element is derived from the word hvítr which means "white". The last element derives from the word eyjar which means "islands". Thus the name means "the white islands", probably because there is white quartz in the rocks on the islands. Originally, the spelling of the municipality was "Kvitingsø", but later it was shortened to "Kvitsøy".

=== Coat of arms ===
The coat of arms was granted on 25 May 1989. The official blazon is "Azure, three lighthouses argent, two over one" (Norwegian: I blått tre sølv fyrlykter, 2-1). This means the arms have a blue field (background) and the charge is a set of three lighthouse tops. The charge has a tincture of argent which means it is commonly colored white, but if it is made out of metal, then silver is used. The choice of lighthouses and the color blue are symbolic of the importance of the sea for this island municipality. The arms were designed by Even Jarl Skognlund. The municipal flag has the same design as the coat of arms.

=== Churches ===
The Church of Norway has one parish (sokn) within Kvitsøy Municipality. It is part of the Tungenes prosti (deanery) in the Diocese of Stavanger.

Churches in Kvitsøy Municipality
Parish (sokn)	Church name	Location of the church	Year built
Kvitsøy	Kvitsøy Church	Kvitsøy	1620

== History ==
Kvitsøy is first mentioned in the Snorre Saga, where Snorre records a truce being made between King Olaf II of Norway later to be known as St. Olav (Norwegian: Hellige Olav) and Erling Skjalgsson, under the stone cross. Later it seems that the islands were owned by the Church until the reformation in 1536 (when the nation switched from Roman Catholicism to Lutheranism), when it became Crown property. In 1591, the population had become large enough to fund the construction of the Kvitsøy Church, which is still standing and the first new church in the county after the reformation. From the mid-18th century, Kvitsøy was the location of one of the first navigation beacons in western Norway, and this was later converted to a lighthouse service when the Kvitsøy Lighthouse was built. Kvitsøy Vessel Traffic Service Centre opened on 3 January 2003.

=== Transmitter ===
Kvitsøy used to be the site of high power short wave and medium wave broadcasting transmitters of the national broadcasting company, NRK. The aerial tower of the medium-wave transmitter is the Kvitsøy Tower. The transmitter for the medium-wave channel 1314 kHz was switched off at 22:00 UTC (Midnight local time) on Friday June 30, 2006, shortwave broadcasts continued until 2011. In May and June 2012, the entire site was dismantled.

== Government ==
Kvitsøy Municipality is responsible for primary education (through 10th grade), outpatient health services, senior citizen services, welfare and other social services, zoning, economic development, and municipal roads and utilities. The municipality is governed by a municipal council of directly elected representatives. The mayor is indirectly elected by a vote of the municipal council. The municipality is under the jurisdiction of the Sør-Rogaland District Court and the Gulating Court of Appeal.

=== Municipal council ===
The municipal council (Kommunestyre) of Kvitsøy Municipality is made up of 17 representatives that are elected to four-year terms. The tables below show the current and historical composition of the council by political party.

Kvitsøy kommunestyre 2023–2027
Party name (in Norwegian)	Number of representatives
Progress Party (Fremskrittspartiet)	1
Conservative Party (Høyre)	4
Christian Democratic Party and Cross-Party List (KrF og Tverrpolitisk liste)	5
Local list (Bygdelisten)	5
Total number of members:	17

Kvitsøy kommunestyre 2019–2023
Party name (in Norwegian)	Number of representatives
Progress Party (Fremskrittspartiet)	3
Joint list of the Labour Party, Centre Party, and the Kvitsøy List (Felleslista: Arbeiderpartiet, Senterpartiet, og Kvitsøylisten)	7
Joint list of the Christian Democratic Party and non-socialists (Felleslista Kristelig folkeparti og Frie borgerlige)	5
Total number of members:	15

Kvitsøy kommunestyre 2015–2019
Party name (in Norwegian)	Number of representatives
Progress Party (Fremskrittspartiet)	2
Joint list of the Labour Party and bipartisan group (Felleslista: Arbeiderpartiet og tverrpolitisk gruppe)	3
Joint list of the Christian Democratic Party and non-socialists (Felleslista Kristelig folkeparti og Frie borgerlige)	6
Kvitsøy List (Kvitsøy Listen)	4
Total number of members:	15

Kvitsøy kommunestyre 2011–2015
Party name (in Norwegian)	Number of representatives
Progress Party (Fremskrittspartiet)	3
Joint list of the Labour Party and bipartisan group (Felleslista: Arbeiderpartiet og tverrpolitisk gruppe)	7
Joint list of the Christian Democratic Party and non-socialists (Felleslista Kristelig folkeparti og Frie borgerlige)	5
Total number of members:	15

Kvitsøy kommunestyre 2007–2011
Party name (in Norwegian)	Number of representatives
Joint list of the Labour Party and bipartisan group (Felleslista: Arbeiderpartiet og tverrpolitisk gruppe)	6
Joint list of the Christian Democratic Party and non-socialists (Felleslista Kristelig folkeparti og Frie borgerlige)	9
Total number of members:	15

Kvitsøy kommunestyre 2003–2007
Party name (in Norwegian)	Number of representatives
Joint list of the Labour Party and bipartisan group (Felleslista: Arbeiderpartiet og tverrpolitisk gruppe)	7
Joint list of the Christian Democratic Party and non-socialists (Felleslista Kristelig folkeparti og Frie borgerlige)	8
Total number of members:	15

Kvitsøy kommunestyre 1999–2003
Party name (in Norwegian)	Number of representatives
Joint list of the Christian Democratic Party, Labour Party, and non-socialists (Felleslista Kristelig folkeparti, Arbeiderpartiet, og Frie borgerlige)	9
Local list (Bygdeliste)	6
Total number of members:	15

Kvitsøy kommunestyre 1995–1999
Party name (in Norwegian)	Number of representatives
Labour Party (Arbeiderpartiet)	3
Christian Democratic Party (Kristelig Folkeparti)	4
Common list (Samlingliste)	8
Total number of members:	15

Kvitsøy kommunestyre 1991–1995
Party name (in Norwegian)	Number of representatives
Labour Party (Arbeiderpartiet)	3
Conservative Party (Høyre)	3
Christian Democratic Party (Kristelig Folkeparti)	3
Kvitsøy local list (Kvitsøy bygdeliste)	6
Total number of members:	15

Kvitsøy kommunestyre 1987–1991
Party name (in Norwegian)	Number of representatives
Labour Party (Arbeiderpartiet)	3
Conservative Party (Høyre)	3
Christian Democratic Party (Kristelig Folkeparti)	5
Kvitsøy local list (Kvitsøy bygdeliste)	4
Total number of members:	15

Kvitsøy kommunestyre 1983–1987
Party name (in Norwegian)	Number of representatives
Labour Party (Arbeiderpartiet)	3
Christian Democratic Party (Kristelig Folkeparti)	3
Joint List(s) of Non-Socialist Parties (Borgerlige Felleslister)	4
Non-party list (Upolitisk liste)	2
Cross-party local list (Tverrpolitisk bygdeliste)	3
Total number of members:	15

Kvitsøy kommunestyre 1979–1983
Party name (in Norwegian)	Number of representatives
Labour Party (Arbeiderpartiet)	3
Christian Democratic Party (Kristelig Folkeparti)	4
Joint List(s) of Non-Socialist Parties (Borgerlige Felleslister)	5
Non-party list (Upolitisk liste)	1
Total number of members:	13

Kvitsøy kommunestyre 1975–1979
Party name (in Norwegian)	Number of representatives
Labour Party (Arbeiderpartiet)	3
Joint List(s) of Non-Socialist Parties (Borgerlige Felleslister)	10
Total number of members:	13

Kvitsøy kommunestyre 1971–1975
Party name (in Norwegian)	Number of representatives
Labour Party (Arbeiderpartiet)	3
Joint List(s) of Non-Socialist Parties (Borgerlige Felleslister)	10
Total number of members:	13

Kvitsøy kommunestyre 1967–1971
Party name (in Norwegian)	Number of representatives
Labour Party (Arbeiderpartiet)	2
Joint List(s) of Non-Socialist Parties (Borgerlige Felleslister)	11
Total number of members:	13

Kvitsøy kommunestyre 1963–1967
Party name (in Norwegian)	Number of representatives
Local List(s) (Lokale lister)	13
Total number of members:	13

Kvitsøy herredsstyre 1959–1963
Party name (in Norwegian)	Number of representatives
Labour Party (Arbeiderpartiet)	3
Local List(s) (Lokale lister)	10
Total number of members:	13

Kvitsøy herredsstyre 1955–1959
Party name (in Norwegian)	Number of representatives
Local List(s) (Lokale lister)	13
Total number of members:	13

Kvitsøy herredsstyre 1951–1955
Party name (in Norwegian)	Number of representatives
Labour Party (Arbeiderpartiet)	4
Local List(s) (Lokale lister)	8
Total number of members:	12

Kvitsøy herredsstyre 1947–1951
Party name (in Norwegian)	Number of representatives
Local List(s) (Lokale lister)	12
Total number of members:	12

Kvitsøy herredsstyre 1945–1947
Party name (in Norwegian)	Number of representatives
Labour Party (Arbeiderpartiet)	4
Joint List(s) of Non-Socialist Parties (Borgerlige Felleslister)	8
Total number of members:	12

Kvitsøy herredsstyre 1937–1941*
Party name (in Norwegian)	Number of representatives
Local List(s) (Lokale lister)	12
Total number of members:	12
Note: Due to the German occupation of Norway during World War II, no elections were held for new municipal councils until after the war ended in 1945.

=== Mayors ===
The mayor (Bokmål: ordfører) of Kvitsøy Municipality is the political leader of the municipality and the chairperson of the municipal council. The following people have held this position:

- 1923–1925: Tore T. Meling
- 1926–1928: Anton Kandal
- 1929–1934: Hans Jørgensen
- 1935–1937: Oskar Nordbø
- 1937–1941: Hans Jørgensen
- 1941–1942: John Johnsen
- 1942–1945: Thoralf Randaberg
- 1946–1951: Oskar Nordbø
- 1951–1963: Henrik Håland
- 1963–1965: Rasmus Hviding
- 1965–1967: Håkon Holgersen
- 1967–1969: Peder M. Haaland (LL)
- 1971–1979: Henry Ramstad (Ap)
- 1979–1983: Berner Høie (KrF)
- 1983–1995: Turid Kvamme (Ap)
- 1995–1999: Peder Meling (LL)
- 1999–2001: Leif Ydstebøe (LL)
- 2001–2011: Ole Olsen, Jr. (KrF)
- 2011–2019: Mirjam Ydstebø (KrF)
- 2019–2023: Stian Gill Bjørsvik (KrF)
- 2023–present: Kjell André Nordbø (LL)

== Geography ==
The municipality is an archipelago located at the entrance to the large Boknafjorden. It sits about 2 nautical miles (3.7 km; 2.3 mi) northwest of the mainland Stavanger peninsula and south of the islands of Karmøy and Vestre Bokn. The largest island is Kvitsøy, and it is connected with a few of the other islands in the archipelago, but most of the islands are uninhabited. The highest point in the municipality is the 27.97-metre (91.8 ft) tall hill on the small island of Eime, about 5 kilometres (3.1 mi) northeast of the main island of Kvitsøy.

Karmøy Municipality is located to the northwest, Bokn Municipality is located to the north, Stavanger Municipality is located to the east, Randaberg Municipality is located to the south, and the islands of Sola Municipality is located to the southwest. The North Sea lies to the west.

== Nature ==
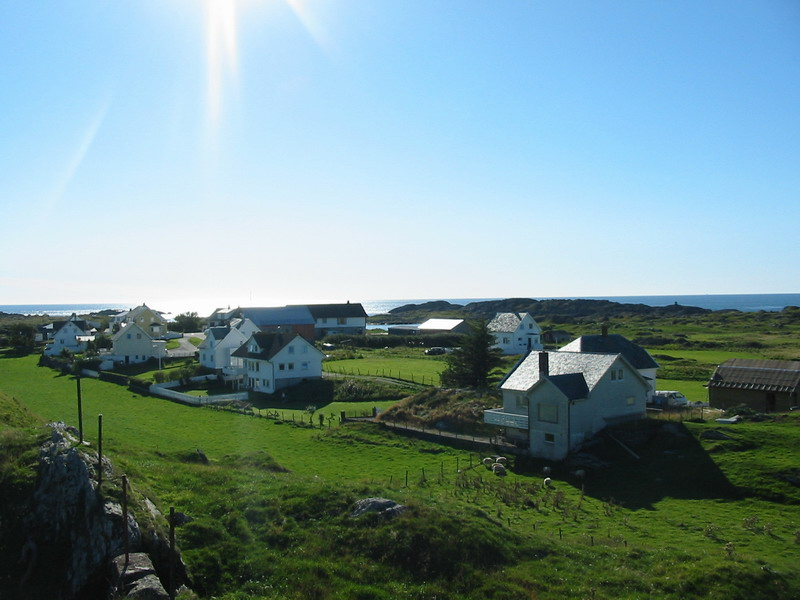
View of Kvitsøy

=== Climate ===
The islands are completely engulfed by the Gulf Stream and hence have a typically wet West Nordic coastal climate. The sea between the islands and the mainland is never frozen. Due to the maritime influence, summers are often chilly with temperatures between 15 °C (59 °F) and 20 °C (68 °F) being the norm. Winter highs usually are in the mid-single digits in all of the Greater Stavanger region.

=== Fauna and flora ===
There are no larger mammals in Kvitsøy except for seals (kobbe) and small dolphins (nise). The islands have a rich marine bird life. Many different plants are found on the islands. Some are natural to Norwegian flora, while others have been transported by ships emptying their hulls of ballast before entering the port of the nearby city of Stavanger.
