= Kvitsøy (island) =

Island in Rogaland, Norway

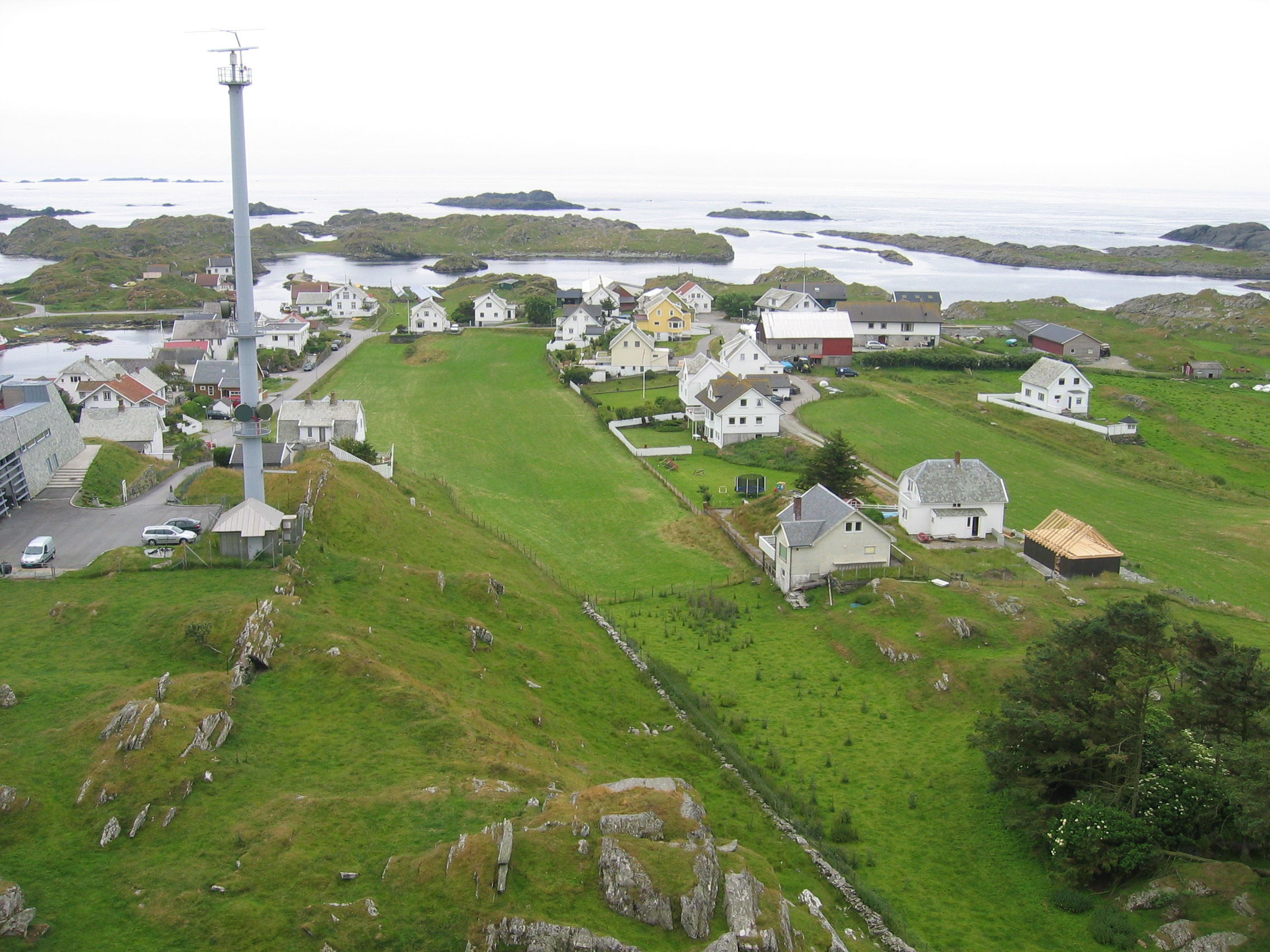
- View over the island
- Interactive map of the island

Geography
- Location: Rogaland, Norway
- Coordinates: 59.06627°N 5.41014°E
- Area: 2.3 km^{2} (0.89 sq mi)
- Length: 1.8 km (1.12 mi)
- Width: 1.8 km (1.12 mi)

Administration
- Norway
- County: Rogaland
- Municipality: Kvitsøy Municipality

Kvitsøy is the main island in Kvitsøy Municipality in Rogaland county, Norway. The 2.3-square-kilometre (0.89 sq mi) island is one of 167 islands and skerries that make up Kvitsøy Municipality. The island is home to most of the municipal residents, as well as the majority of the municipality's land area. The main population centre on the island is the village of Ydstebøhamn on the southern coast. The Kvitsøy Church and Kvitsøy Lighthouse are both located on the island.

The island is only accessible by boat. The village of Ydstebøhamn has a ferry quay which receives regular ferries from the town of Skudeneshavn on the island of Karmøy across the Boknafjorden to the north, and to the village of Mekjarvik in Randaberg Municipality across the Kvitsøyfjorden on the mainland to the south. The planned Rogfast undersea tunnel will connect Kvitsøy island to the mainland to the north and south as part of the government's goal of providing a ferry-free European route E39 highway along the west coast of Norway.

== See also ==
- List of islands of Norway
