= Boknafjord =

Fjord in Rogaland county, Norway

Boknafjorden
- Boknafjord
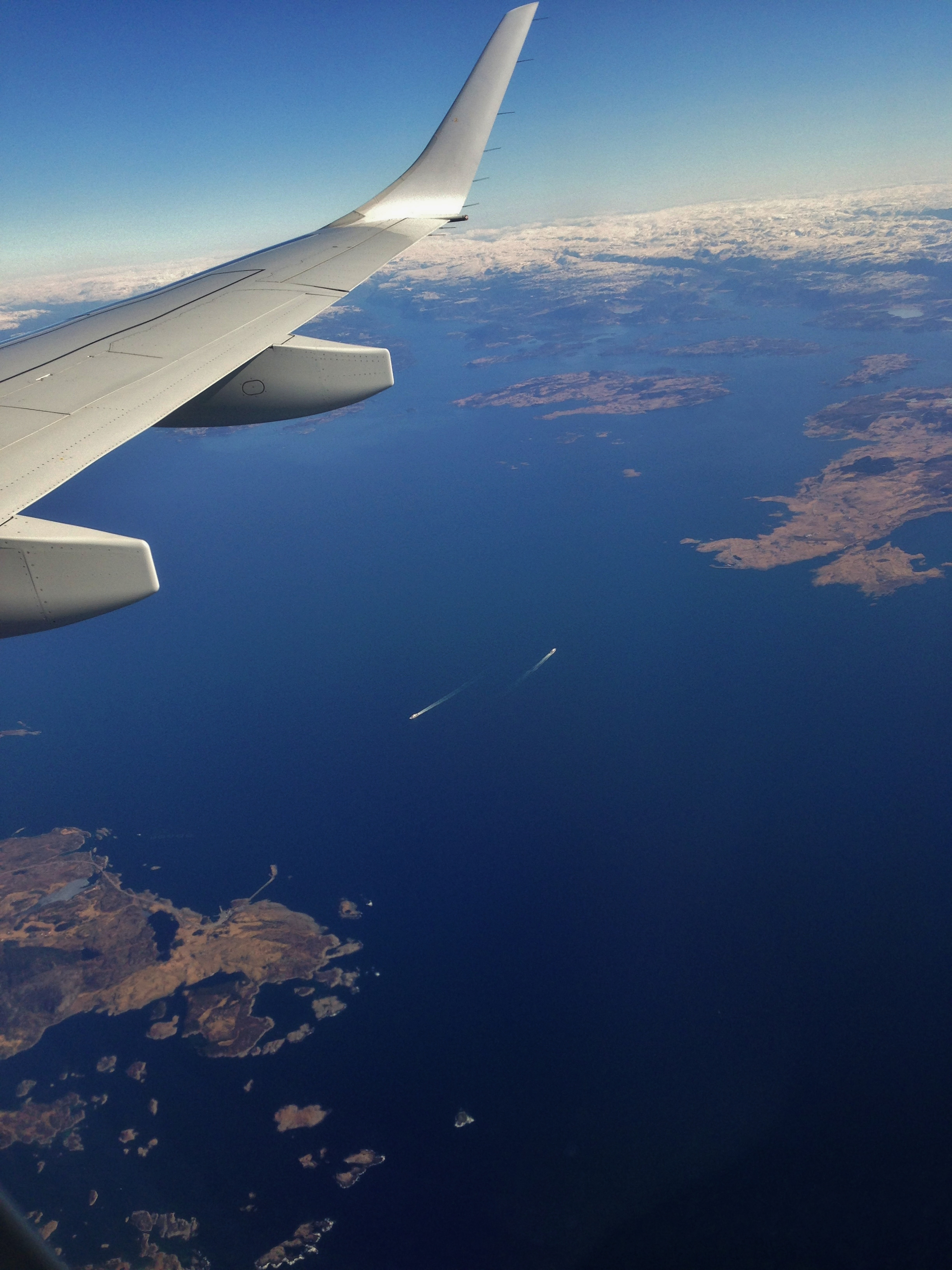
- Aerial view of the fjord
- Interactive map of the fjord
- Location: Rogaland county, Norway
- Coordinates: 59.1193°N 5.4061°E
- Type: Fjord
- Primary outflows: North Sea
- Basin countries: Norway
- Max. length: 96 kilometres (60 mi)
- Settlements: Stavanger

Boknafjord or Boknafjorden (English: Bokna Fjord) is a fjord located in Rogaland county, Norway. The huge fjord lies between the cities of Stavanger and Haugesund and dominates the central part of the county. The main part of the fjord is shared between the municipalities of Kvitsøy, Stavanger, Tysvær, Bokn, and Karmøy. There are dozens of smaller fjords that branch off the main part of the fjord, reaching most municipalities in the county. At its longest, the Boknafjord reaches about 96 kilometres (60 mi) into the mainland at the innermost point of the Hylsfjorden. Other notable branches include the Saudafjorden, Sandsfjorden, Vindafjorden, Hervikfjorden, Førresfjorden, Erfjorden, Jøsenfjorden, Årdalsfjorden, Idsefjorden, Høgsfjorden, Lysefjorden, and Gandsfjorden.

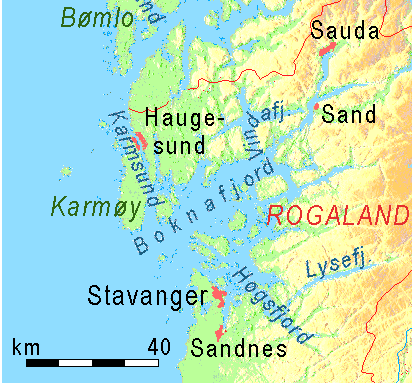
Map of the area

The vast fjord is quite wide, and it has many islands located within its shores, some of which are quite large. Some of the notable islands include Vestre Bokn, Kvitsøy, Rennesøy, Ombo, Finnøy, Mosterøy, and the Sjernarøyane archipelago.

== Tunnel ==
The Rogfast sub-sea tunnel is a huge tunnel project that is constructing a road tunnel under the Boknafjord and the Kvitsøyfjord connecting the cities of Stavanger and Haugesund and ultimately becoming part of a ferry-free highway system along the western coast of Norway. It will also connect the islands of Kvitsøy Municipality to the mainland by road. The 24-kilometre (15 mi) long and 350-metre (1,150 ft) deep tunnel is projected to be completed in 2029. Construction began in 2018. Upon completion, it will be the longest and deepest underwater road tunnel in the world. The cost was expected to be €500–600 million, but later raised to €1,700 million.
