= Norwegian Public Roads Administration =

Norwegian government agency

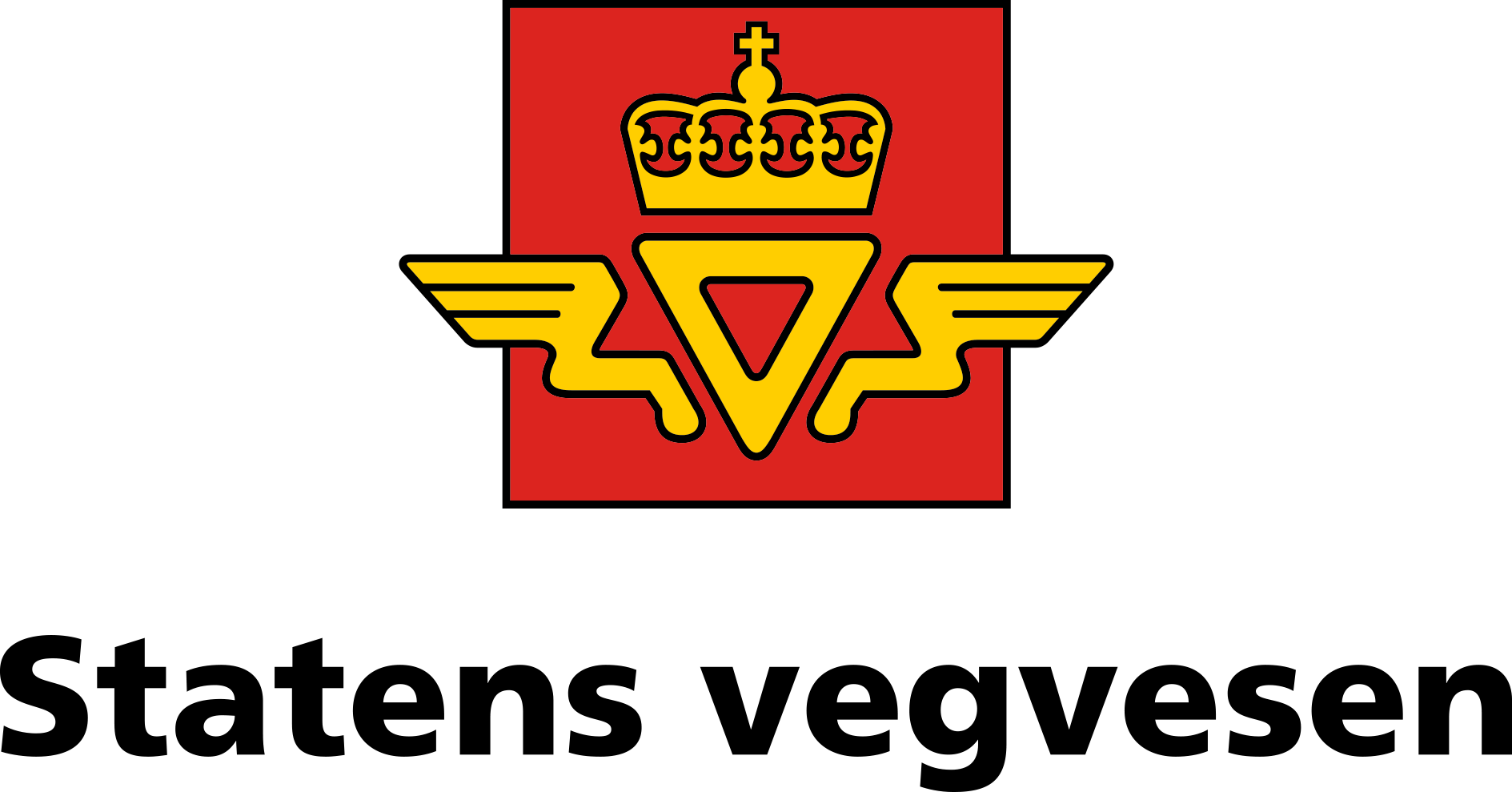

Agency overview
- Formed: 1864
- Jurisdiction: Norway
- Headquarters: Oslo
- Agency executive: Ingrid Dahl Hovland, Director
- Parent agency: Directorate of Public Roads (Ministry of Transport and Communications)
- Website: www.vegvesen.no
- Agency ID: 971 032 081

The Norwegian Public Roads Administration (Norwegian: Statens vegvesen) is a Norwegian government agency responsible for national and county public roads in Norway. This includes planning, construction and operation of the national and county road networks, driver training and licensing, vehicle inspection, and subsidies to car ferries.

The agency is led by the Directorate of Public Roads (Vegdirektoratet), and is subordinate to the Ministry of Transport and Communications. The Norwegian Public Roads Administration is divided into five regions and thirty districts, which are subordinate to the directorate. The directorate is based in Oslo.

The Norwegian Public Roads Administration is one of the largest government agencies of Norway in terms of budget. In matters concerning national roads, the agency is subordinate to the ministry and in matters concerning county roads subordinate to the county administration.

== Core activities ==
The Norwegian Public Roads Administration strives to ensure that the road transport system in Norway is safe, sustainable, efficient and available to all. The NPRA manages national roads on behalf of the national government, (10,700 kilometres or 6,600 miles) and on behalf of the county administrations (about 44,600 kilometres or 27,700 miles). This involves planning, developing, operating and maintaining the roads. The agency is also responsible for the Norwegian Scenic Routes.

Tunnels and bridges: Topographic conditions in Norway are a major challenge for infrastructure development. In Norway there are more than 1,040 tunnels on the national and county roads. At any time, 30-40 tunnels are under construction. Some of these are replacing older tunnels. The tunnels are on average one kilometre long. The national and county roads have about 19,760 bridges, ferry quays and other load-bearing structures (e.g. retaining walls). Many of the bridges are relatively short, but Norway has 861 bridges that are longer than 100 metres. 22 bridges are longer than 1000 metres.

Licences and vehicles: The Norwegian Public Roads Administration has 70 Driver and Vehicle Licensing Offices around the country. Many of the services provided here can also be carried out online. As a government agency, the Norwegian Public Roads Administration is responsible for the inspection of vehicles, supervisory tasks and conducting driving tests. In several areas, the agency has the authority to develop and approve regulations and make decisions pertaining to road users and vehicles. There are 3.3 million registered vehicles in Norway, of which 145,559 are electrically powered (31 December 2017). More than 1.1 million vehicle registrations (first registration, registration transfers, used car imports, conversion) were made in 2017. The Norwegian Public Roads Administration issues annually about 500,000 new driving licences (first-time issues and renewals)

Traffic safety: The last three years (2015, 2016 and 2017) Norway has been voted Europe's safest country for road users by the European Transport Safety Council. A central goal for the NPRA is to work towards a vision of "zero people killed or severely injured in traffic". The NPRA works systematically to increase road safety. In 1970, 560 people died in traffic. In 2017, 106 were killed on Norwegian roads. In 2001, the Storting (Norwegian Parliament) launched Vision Zero. The investments that follow our strategic programme for 2018 to 2024 will to lead to an annual reduction of 25 fewer killed or severely injured. Campaigns, inspections and safer vehicles will help pull the figures further down.

Research and development: The Norwegian Public Roads Administration initiates and conducts applied research. The research is conducted in close collaboration with relevant research institutes or universities. As a construction client organisation, the Norwegian Public Roads Administration is also able to carry out full-scale testing of research results.

== History ==
Originally, the Ministry of Justice had the responsibility for public roads. In 1846, Prime Minister Frederik Stang created the position of Roads Assistant in the Ministry of the Interior. The Roads Assistant headed a department for roads engineering. Captain (Engineer) H. K. Finne became the first Roads Assistant. The Directorate of Public Roads was established in 1864, and C. W. Berg became the first Director of Public Roads. From 1885 to 1944, the Directorate was subordinate to the Ministry of Labour, and has since been subordinate to the Ministry of Transport and Communications.

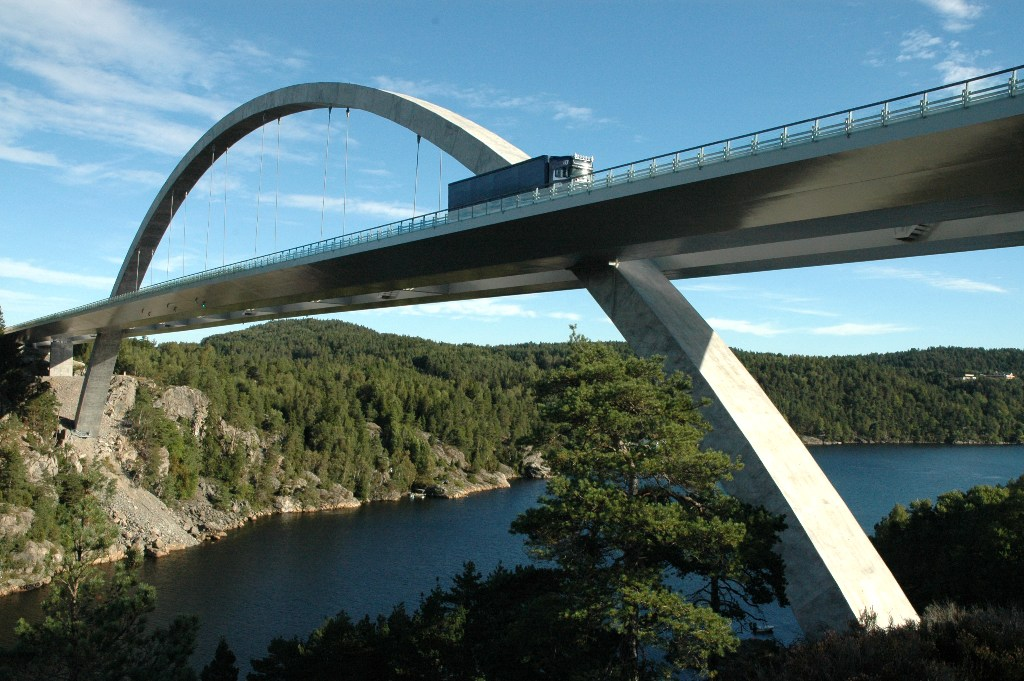
The Svinesund Bridge

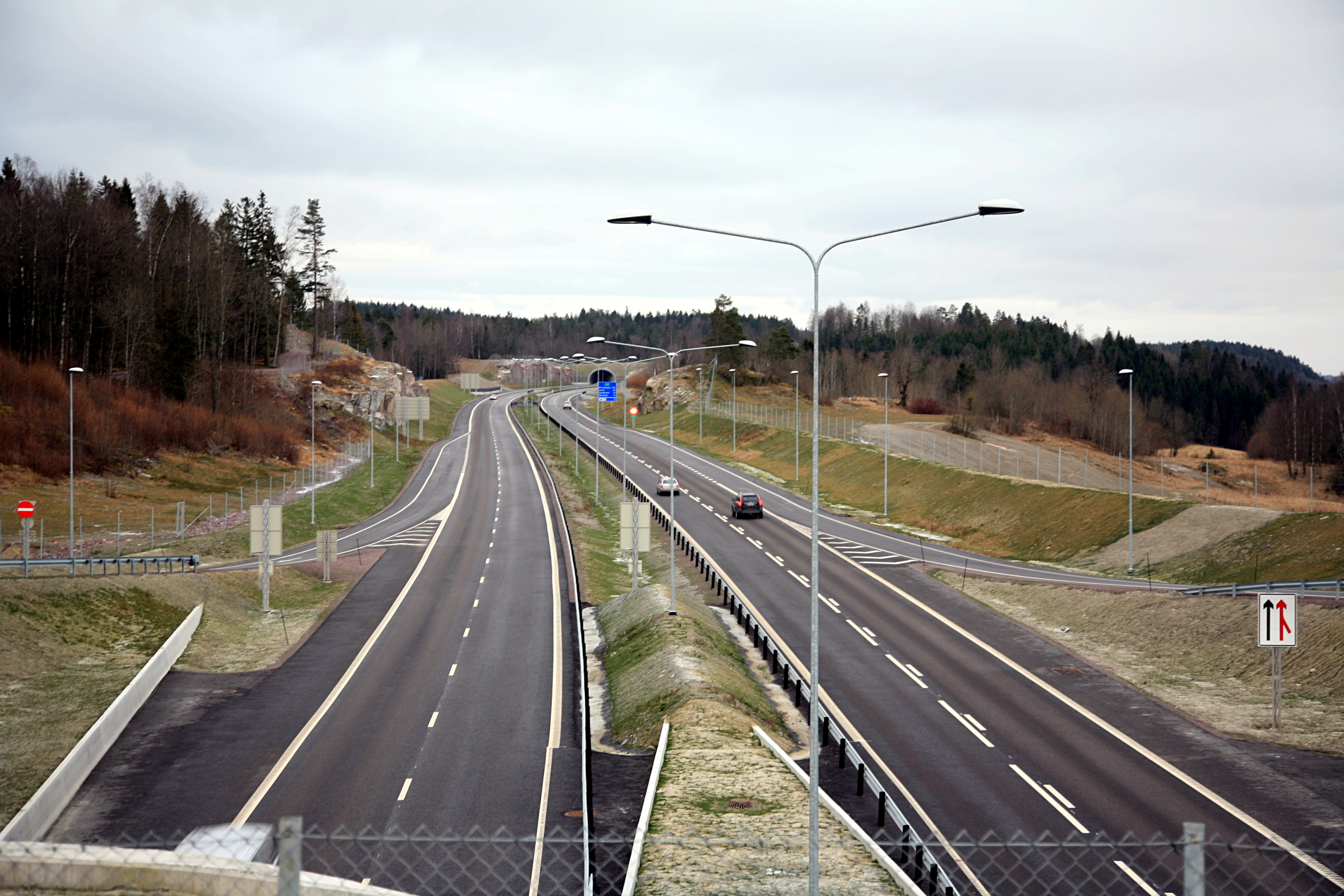
E18

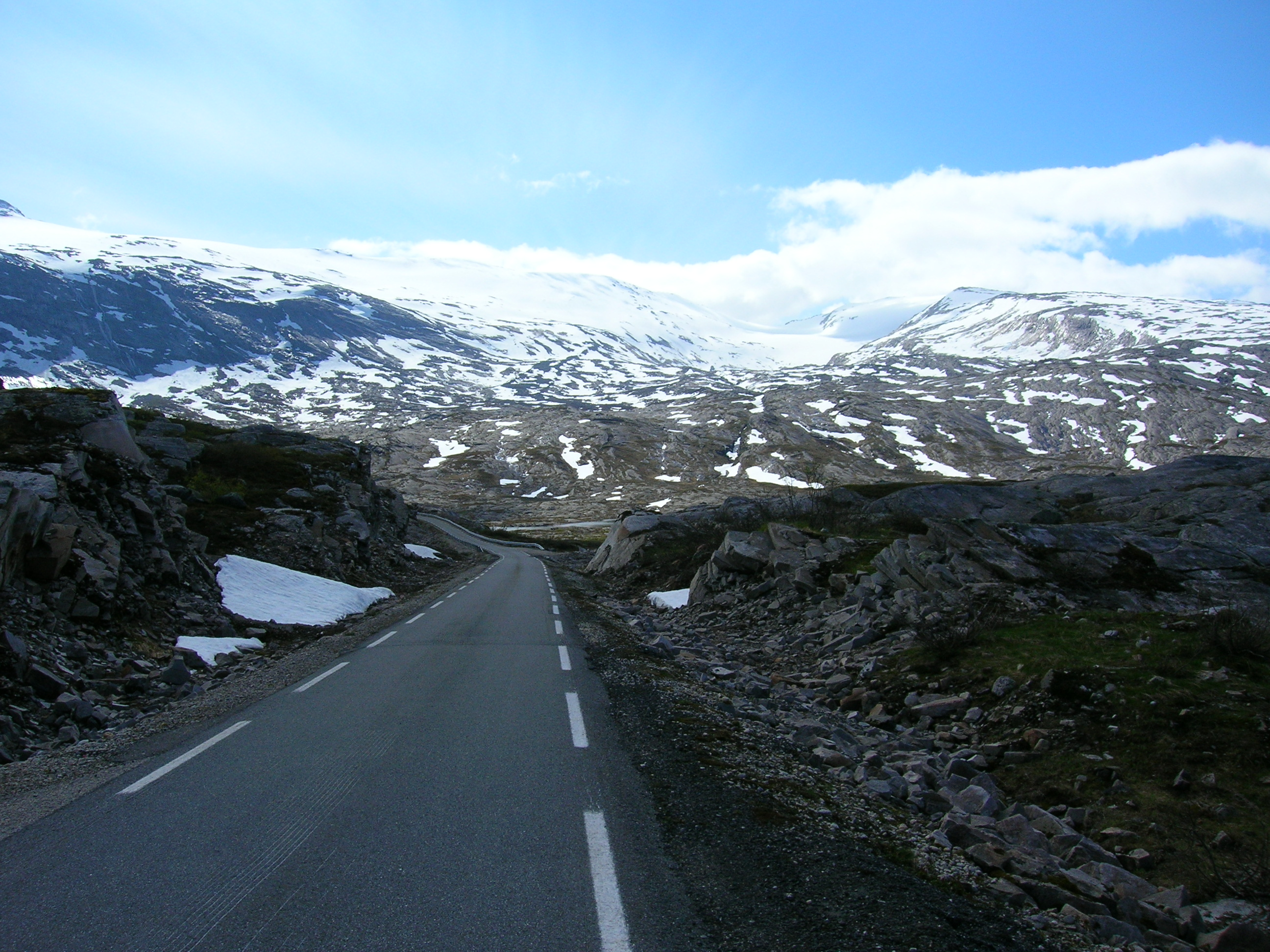
County road 355 in Nordland

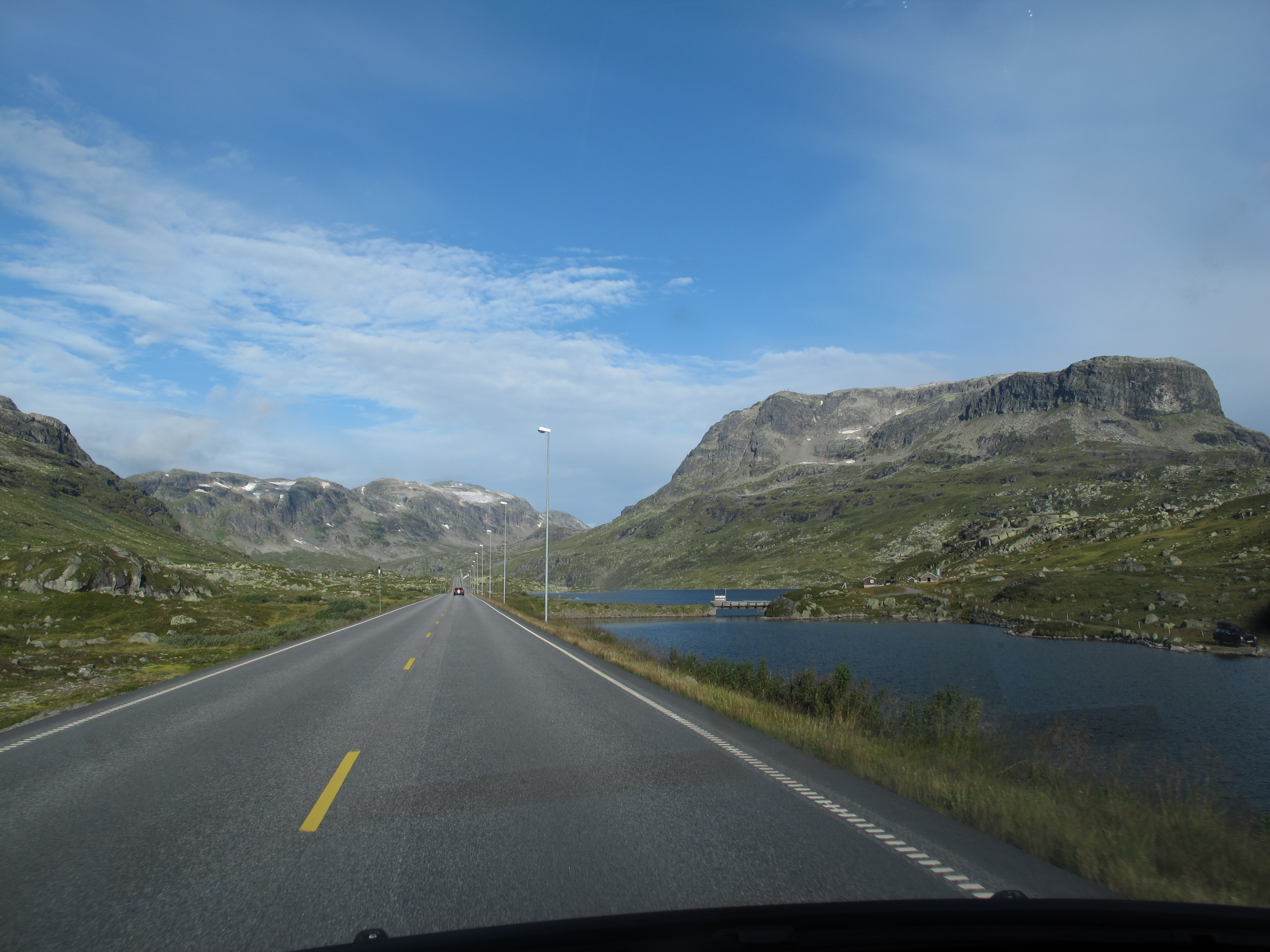
E134 (Hordaland)

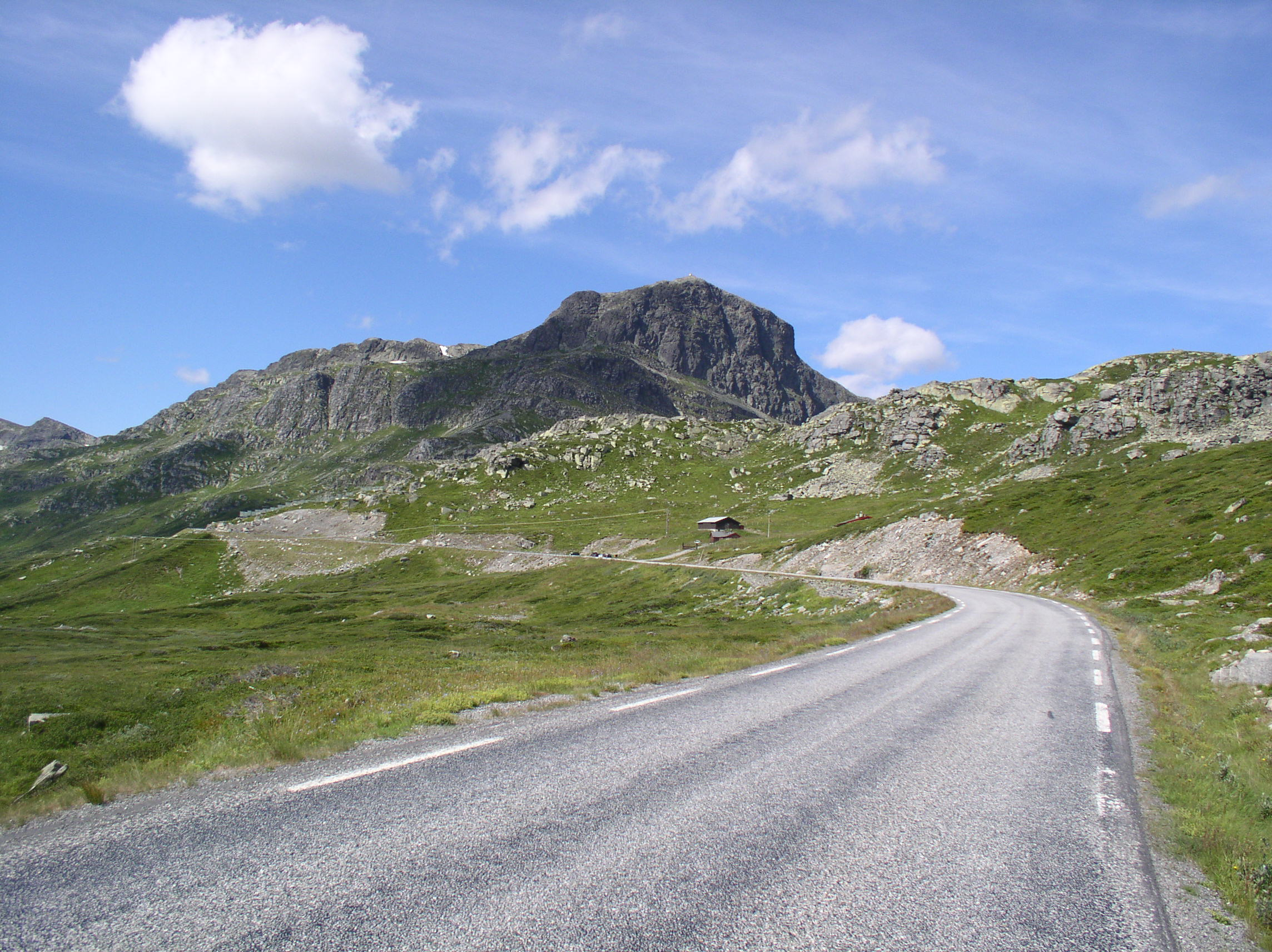
County road 51 in Valdres

== See also ==
- European route E39
