= Ålen Municipality =

Former municipality in Trøndelag, Norway

Ålen Municipality Ålen herred
- Former municipality
- Aalen herred (historic name)
- Sør-Trøndelag within Norway

- Ålen within Sør-Trøndelag
- Coordinates: 62.8419°N 11.3013°E
- Country: Norway
- County: Sør-Trøndelag
- District: Gauldalen
- Established: 1855
  - Preceded by: Holtaalen Municipality
- Disestablished: 1 Jan 1972
  - Succeeded by: Holtålen Municipality
- Administrative centre: Renbygda

Government
  - Mayor (1964–1971): Olav Myran (Ap)

Area (upon dissolution)
  - Total: 718.1 km^{2} (277.3 sq mi)
  - Rank: #149 in Norway
- Highest elevation: 1,320 m (4,330 ft)

Population (1971)
  - Total: 1,987
  - Rank: #373 in Norway
  - Density: 2.8/km^{2} (7.3/sq mi)
  - Change (10 years): ▼ −10.1%
- Demonym: Ålbygg

Official language
  - Norwegian form: Neutral
- Time zone: UTC+01:00 (CET)
  - Summer (DST): UTC+02:00 (CEST)
- ISO 3166 code: NO-1644

Ålen is a former municipality in the old Sør-Trøndelag county, Norway. The 718-square-kilometre (277 sq mi) former municipality existed from 1855 until 1972. It encompassed the southeastern half of what is now Holtålen Municipality in Trøndelag county. The administrative centre was the village of Renbygda (also known as Ålen) where Ålen Church is located.

Prior to its dissolution in 1972, the 718.1-square-kilometre (277.3 sq mi) municipality was the 149th largest by area out of the 449 municipalities in Norway. Ålen Municipality was the 373rd most populous municipality in Norway with a population of about 1,987. The municipality's population density was 2.8 inhabitants per square kilometre (7.3/sq mi) and its population had decreased by 10.1% over the previous 10-year period.

== General information ==
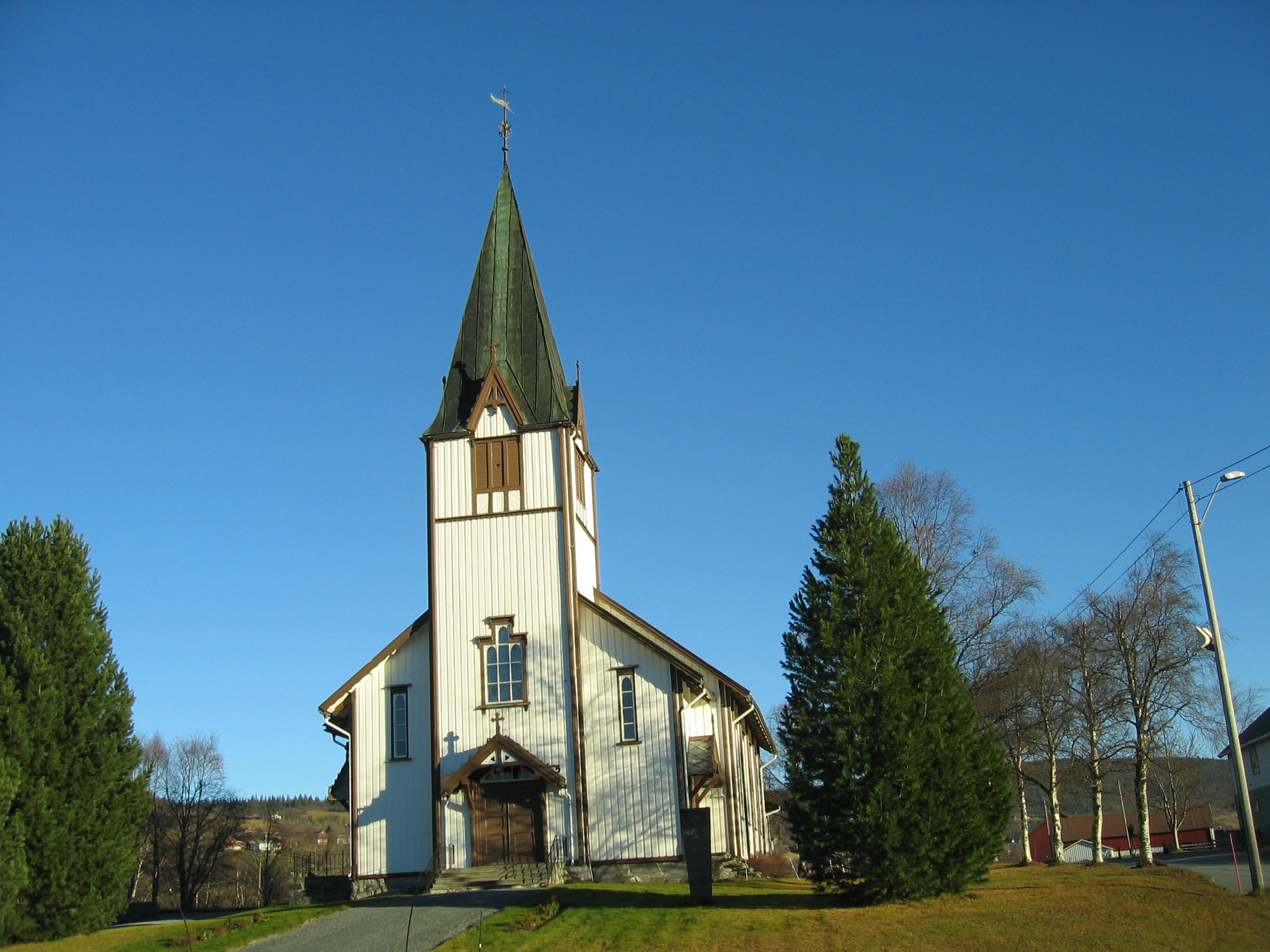
Ålen Church

The parish of Aalen (later spelled Ålen) was established as a municipality in 1855 when Holtaalen Municipality was divided into two and the southeastern part became the new Aalen Municipality (population: 1,487). In 1875, an uninhabited part of Aalen was moved to the neighboring Røros Municipality. Starting in the 1960s, there were many municipal mergers across Norway due to the work of the Schei Committee. On 1 January 1972, Ålen Municipality (population: 1,944) was merged with the neighboring Haltdalen Municipality (population: 778) and together they formed the new Holtålen Municipality (bringing back the name Holtålen, the historic name for the old Haltdalen Municipality).

=== Name ===
The municipality (originally the parish) is named Ålen, after an old name for the area. The name is the definite singular form of the Old Norse word áll which means "eel". This name likely refers to the winding valley in which the main village centre is located. On 21 December 1917, a royal resolution enacted the 1917 Norwegian language reforms. Prior to this change, the name was spelled Aalen with the digraph "Aa", and after this reform, the name was spelled Ålen, using the letter Å instead.

=== Churches ===
The Church of Norway had one parish (sokn) within Ålen Municipality. At the time of the municipal dissolution, it was part of the Haltdalen prestegjeld and the Gauldal prosti (deanery) in the Diocese of Nidaros.

Churches in Ålen Municipality
Parish (sokn)	Church name	Location of the church	Year built
Ålen	Ålen Church	Ålen	1881
Ålen	Hessdalen Chapel	Hessdalen	1940

== Geography ==
The highest point in the municipality was the 1,320-metre (4,330 ft) tall mountain Forollhogna. The mountain lies at a border point between Tolga-Os Municipality, Ålen Municipality, Haltdalen Municipality, and Singsås Municipality.

== Government ==
While it existed, Ålen Municipality was responsible for primary education (through 10th grade), outpatient health services, senior citizen services, welfare and other social services, zoning, economic development, and municipal roads and utilities. The municipality was governed by a municipal council of directly elected representatives. The mayor was indirectly elected by a vote of the municipal council. The municipality was under the jurisdiction of the Frostating Court of Appeal.

=== Municipal council ===
The municipal council (Kommunestyre) of Ålen Municipality was made up of 17 representatives that were elected to four year terms. The tables below show the historical composition of the council by political party.

Ålen kommunestyre 1967–1971
Party name (in Norwegian)	Number of representatives
Labour Party (Arbeiderpartiet)	14
Christian Democratic Party (Kristelig Folkeparti)	1
Local List(s) (Lokale lister)	2
Total number of members:	17

Ålen kommunestyre 1963–1967
Party name (in Norwegian)	Number of representatives
Labour Party (Arbeiderpartiet)	15
Christian Democratic Party (Kristelig Folkeparti)	2
Total number of members:	17

Ålen herredsstyre 1959–1963
Party name (in Norwegian)	Number of representatives
Labour Party (Arbeiderpartiet)	14
Christian Democratic Party (Kristelig Folkeparti)	1
Local List(s) (Lokale lister)	2
Total number of members:	17

Ålen herredsstyre 1955–1959
Party name (in Norwegian)	Number of representatives
Labour Party (Arbeiderpartiet)	14
Christian Democratic Party (Kristelig Folkeparti)	1
Local List(s) (Lokale lister)	2
Total number of members:	17

Ålen herredsstyre 1951–1955
Party name (in Norwegian)	Number of representatives
Labour Party (Arbeiderpartiet)	13
Christian Democratic Party (Kristelig Folkeparti)	1
Local List(s) (Lokale lister)	2
Total number of members:	16

Ålen herredsstyre 1947–1951
Party name (in Norwegian)	Number of representatives
Labour Party (Arbeiderpartiet)	14
Christian Democratic Party (Kristelig Folkeparti)	2
Total number of members:	16

Ålen herredsstyre 1945–1947
Party name (in Norwegian)	Number of representatives
Labour Party (Arbeiderpartiet)	12
Communist Party (Kommunistiske Parti)	2
Local List(s) (Lokale lister)	2
Total number of members:	16

Ålen herredsstyre 1937–1941*
Party name (in Norwegian)	Number of representatives
Labour Party (Arbeiderpartiet)	13
Joint List(s) of Non-Socialist Parties (Borgerlige Felleslister)	3
Total number of members:	16
Note: Due to the German occupation of Norway during World War II, no elections were held for new municipal councils until after the war ended in 1945.

=== Mayors ===
The mayor (Norwegian: ordfører) of Ålen Municipality was the political leader of the municipality and the chairperson of the municipal council. Here is a list of people who held this position:

- 1855–1863: Carl Aas
- 1864–1897: Jon Jørgensen Reitan (V)
- 1898–1901: Eilif Hofstad (V)
- 1902–1904: Anders Jonsen Reitan (V)
- 1905–1907: Peder P. Lien (V)
- 1908–1916: Svend Larsen Skaardal (Ap)
- 1917–1931: Lars Henriksen Kirkbak (Ap)
- 1932–1945: Ole Kristoffersen Sundt (Ap/NS)
- 1945–1945: Halfdan Bendz (LL)
- 1946–1963: Lars Rønning (Ap)
- 1964–1971: Olav Myran (Ap)

== See also ==
- List of former municipalities of Norway
