= Haltdalen Municipality =

Former municipality in Trøndelag, Norway

Haltdalen Municipality Haltdalen herred
- Former municipality
- Holtålen herred (historic name); Holtaalen herred (historic name)
- Sør-Trøndelag within Norway

- Haltdalen within Sør-Trøndelag
- Coordinates: 62.9266°N 11.1406°E
- Country: Norway
- County: Sør-Trøndelag
- District: Gauldalen
- Established: 1 Jan 1838
  - Created as: Formannskapsdistrikt
- Disestablished: 1 Jan 1972
  - Succeeded by: Holtålen Municipality
- Administrative centre: Haltdalen

Government
  - Mayor (1968–1971): Arne Kvernmo (Ap)

Area (upon dissolution)
  - Total: 508.8 km^{2} (196.4 sq mi)
  - Rank: #204 in Norway
- Highest elevation: 1,320 m (4,330 ft)

Population (1971)
  - Total: 795
  - Rank: #438 in Norway
  - Density: 1.6/km^{2} (4.1/sq mi)
  - Change (10 years): ▼ −18%
- Demonym(s): Haltdaling; Haltdøl

Official language
  - Norwegian form: Neutral
- Time zone: UTC+01:00 (CET)
  - Summer (DST): UTC+02:00 (CEST)
- ISO 3166 code: NO-1645

Haltdalen (historically: Holtaalen or Holtålen) is a former municipality in the old Sør-Trøndelag county, Norway. The 509-square-kilometre (197 sq mi) municipality existed from 1838 until 1972 when it was merged with Ålen Municipality to become the present-day Holtålen Municipality in Trøndelag county. The administrative centre of the municipality was the village of Haltdalen where the Haltdalen Church is located.

Prior to its dissolution in 1972, the 509-square-kilometre (197 sq mi) municipality was the 204th largest by area out of the 449 municipalities in Norway. Haltdalen Municipality was the 438th most populous municipality in Norway with a population of about 795. The municipality's population density was 1.6 inhabitants per square kilometre (4.1/sq mi) and its population had decreased by 18% over the previous 10-year period.

== General information ==
The parish of Holtaalen (later re-named Haltdalen) was established as a municipality on 1 January 1838 (see formannskapsdistrikt law). In 1841, the western part of the municipality (population: 1,272) was separated to become the new Singsaas Municipality. This left Holtaalen with 1,885 residents. Then in 1855, the southeastern part of Holtaalen Municipality (population: 1,487) was separated to become the new Aalen Municipality. This left Holtaalen Municipality with 809 residents. In 1917, the spelling of the name was changed to Holtålen Municipality. In 1937, the name was changed from Holtålen Municipality to Haltdalen Municipality. Starting in the 1960s, there were many municipal mergers across Norway due to the work of the Schei Committee. On 1 January 1972, Ålen Municipality (population: 1,944) was merged with the neighboring Haltdalen Municipality (population: 778) and together they formed the new Holtålen Municipality (bringing back the name Holtålen, the historic name for Haltdalen Municipality).

=== Name ===
The municipality (originally the parish) was first named Holtaalen. The first element of the name comes from the local river Holta, a side branch of the larger Gaula River. The last element is áll which means "narrow river channel" (like an eel). On 21 December 1917, a royal resolution enacted the 1917 Norwegian language reforms. Prior to this change, the name was spelled Holtaalen with the digraph "aa", and after this reform, the name was spelled Holtålen, using the letter å instead.

On 15 October 1937, a royal resolution changed the name of the municipality to Haltdalen, effective 1 January 1938. The first element of the new name came from the same river name as before. The last element comes from dalr which means "valley" or "dale". The municipality kept this name until 1972 when the municipality was merged with the neighboring Ålen Municipality to form the new Holtålen Municipality, resurrecting the old name of the municipality that was used before 1937.

=== Churches ===
The Church of Norway had one parish (sokn) within Haltdalen Municipality. At the time of the municipal dissolution, it was part of the Haltdalen prestegjeld and the Gauldal prosti (deanery) in the Diocese of Nidaros.

Churches in Haltdalen Municipality
Parish (sokn)	Church name	Location of the church	Year built
Haltdalen	Haltdalen Church	Haltdalen	1881
Haltdalen	Aunegrenda Chapel	Aunegrenda	1952

== Geography ==
The highest point in the municipality was the 1,320-metre (4,330 ft) tall mountain Forollhogna. The mountain lies at a border point between Tolga-Os Municipality, Ålen Municipality, Haltdalen Municipality, and Singsås Municipality.

== Government ==
While it existed, Haltdalen Municipality was responsible for primary education (through 10th grade), outpatient health services, senior citizen services, welfare and other social services, zoning, economic development, and municipal roads and utilities. The municipality was governed by a municipal council of directly elected representatives. The mayor was indirectly elected by a vote of the municipal council. The municipality was under the jurisdiction of the Frostating Court of Appeal.

=== Municipal council ===
The municipal council (Herredsstyre) of Haltdalen Municipality was made up of representatives that were elected to four year terms. The tables below show the historical composition of the council by political party.

Haltdalen kommunestyre 1967–1971
Party name (in Norwegian)	Number of representatives
Labour Party (Arbeiderpartiet)	7
Christian Democratic Party (Kristelig Folkeparti)	1
Joint List(s) of Non-Socialist Parties (Borgerlige Felleslister)	5
Total number of members:	13

Haltdalen kommunestyre 1963–1967
Party name (in Norwegian)	Number of representatives
Labour Party (Arbeiderpartiet)	7
Christian Democratic Party (Kristelig Folkeparti)	2
Joint List(s) of Non-Socialist Parties (Borgerlige Felleslister)	4
Total number of members:	13

Haltdalen herredsstyre 1959–1963
Party name (in Norwegian)	Number of representatives
Labour Party (Arbeiderpartiet)	7
Communist Party (Kommunistiske Parti)	1
Christian Democratic Party (Kristelig Folkeparti)	2
Joint List(s) of Non-Socialist Parties (Borgerlige Felleslister)	3
Total number of members:	13

Haltdalen herredsstyre 1955–1959
Party name (in Norwegian)	Number of representatives
Labour Party (Arbeiderpartiet)	8
Communist Party (Kommunistiske Parti)	1
Christian Democratic Party (Kristelig Folkeparti)	2
Joint List(s) of Non-Socialist Parties (Borgerlige Felleslister)	2
Total number of members:	13

Haltdalen herredsstyre 1951–1955
Party name (in Norwegian)	Number of representatives
Labour Party (Arbeiderpartiet)	7
Communist Party (Kommunistiske Parti)	1
Christian Democratic Party (Kristelig Folkeparti)	2
Joint List(s) of Non-Socialist Parties (Borgerlige Felleslister)	2
Total number of members:	12

Haltdalen herredsstyre 1947–1951
Party name (in Norwegian)	Number of representatives
Labour Party (Arbeiderpartiet)	5
Communist Party (Kommunistiske Parti)	2
Christian Democratic Party (Kristelig Folkeparti)	3
Local List(s) (Lokale lister)	2
Total number of members:	12

Haltdalen herredsstyre 1945–1947
Party name (in Norwegian)	Number of representatives
Labour Party (Arbeiderpartiet)	5
Communist Party (Kommunistiske Parti)	2
Christian Democratic Party (Kristelig Folkeparti)	3
Local List(s) (Lokale lister)	2
Total number of members:	12

Haltdalen herredsstyre 1937–1941*
Party name (in Norwegian)	Number of representatives
Labour Party (Arbeiderpartiet)	6
Joint List(s) of Non-Socialist Parties (Borgerlige Felleslister)	5
Local List(s) (Lokale lister)	1
Total number of members:	12
Note: Due to the German occupation of Norway during World War II, no elections were held for new municipal councils until after the war ended in 1945.

=== Mayors ===
The mayor (Norwegian: ordfører) of Haltdalen Municipality was the political leader of the municipality and the chairperson of the municipal council. Here is a list of people who held this position:

- 1838–1840: Halvor Larsen Saxvold
- 1841–1843: Simen Grøt
- 1844–1845: Halstein Åsen
- 1846–1850: Carl Aas
- 1851–1853: Ingebrigt G. Morken
- 1854–1854: Carl Aas
- 1855–1856: Michael Tyrholm Holtermann
- 1856–1857: John Hansen Tamlag
- 1858–1859: Ole Svendsen Nysetvold
- 1860–1861: John Hansen Tamlag
- 1862–1863: Hans Henrik Bøcher Sartz
- 1864–1865: Ole Johnsen Nordaune
- 1866–1904: Ole Svendsen Nysetvold (V)
- 1905–1910: John Kvernmo (H)
- 1911–1922: Arnt Eriksen Gildseth (H)
- 1923–1925: Hans Haugen (V)
- 1926–1928: Hans Bollingmo (LL)
- 1929–1941: Anders K. Sundt (Ap)
- 1941–1941: Nils Krogstad (Ap)
- 1941–1942: Johan Heksem (NS)
- 1942–1945: Per B. Solli (NS)
- 1945–1951: Anders K. Sundt (Ap)
- 1952–1967: Arne Wolden (Ap)
- 1968–1971: Arne Kvernmo (Ap)

== See also ==
- List of former municipalities of Norway
