= Haltdalen =

Village in Holtålen Municipality, Norway

- Village
- Interactive map of Haltdalen
- Location within Trøndelag Location within Norway
- Coordinates: 62.9266°N 11.1406°E
- Country: Norway
- Region: Central Norway
- County: Trøndelag
- District: Gauldalen
- Municipality: Holtålen Municipality
- Elevation: 269 m (883 ft)
- Time zone: UTC+01:00 (CET)
  - Summer (DST): UTC+02:00 (CEST)
- Post Code: 7383 Haltdalen

Haltdalen is a village in Holtålen Municipality in Trøndelag county, Norway. The village is located along the river Gaula, about 15 kilometres (9.3 mi) northwest of the village of Renbygda and about 7 kilometres (4.3 mi) southwest of the village of Aunegrenda. The village of Haltdalen has approximately 600 inhabitants (2004). It is situated along the Rørosbanen railway line connecting the town of Røros and the village of Støren.

Haltdalen-Røros-Brekken is home to the Haltdalen Training Center, which is used as a training camp for cold-weather warfare by Norwegian and American forces.

== History ==
From 1838 until 1972, the village was the administrative centre of the old Haltdalen Municipality. Haltdalen is known for the old Haltdalen Stave Church that was built in the 12th century. The original can be seen at the Sverresborg Museum in Trondheim Municipality. In 2004, a copy of the old stave church was constructed on the grounds of the Haltdalen Church. Also, a replica of the Haltdalen stave church was built in Heimaey in Vestmannaeyjar, Iceland as a gift from Norway to Iceland.
