= Johan Digre =

Norwegian architect and builder

Johan Peter Digre
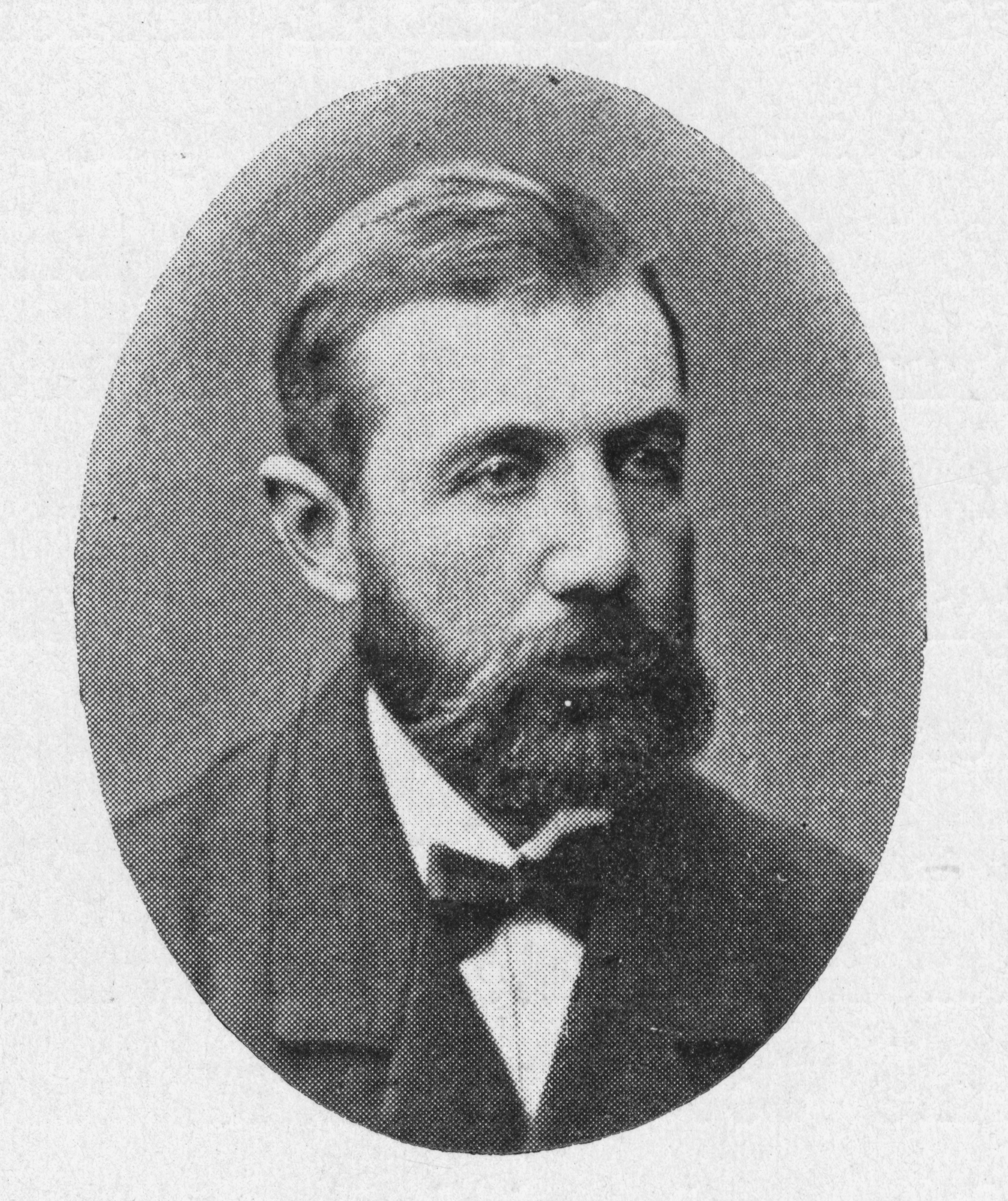
- Born: September , 1844; Trondheim, Norway
- Died: 4 March 1886 (aged 41); Trondheim, Norway
- Occupation: Architect
- Parent: Jacob Digre

Johan Peter Digre (1844–1886) was a Norwegian architect and builder. He was the son of Jacob Digre who ran a large construction company in Trondheim.

Together with his brother Ludwig, he led his father's carpentry and lumber company in Trondheim. Johan Digre was the architect for the prefabricated houses from the company, in addition to having a private architectural office. Digre was also employed as a teacher at the architecture school in Trondheim in 1867 and he was a teacher at Trondhjem's Technical College from 1878 to 1879.

Digre and the construction company designed and/or built several churches in Norway including Singsås Church, Haltdalen Church, Sykkylven Church, Heggstad Church, Rødøy Church, Edøy Church, and Mosvik Church.
