= Haltdalen Stave Church =

Historic church in Trondheim, Norway

Coordinates: 63°25′4″N 10°21′18″E

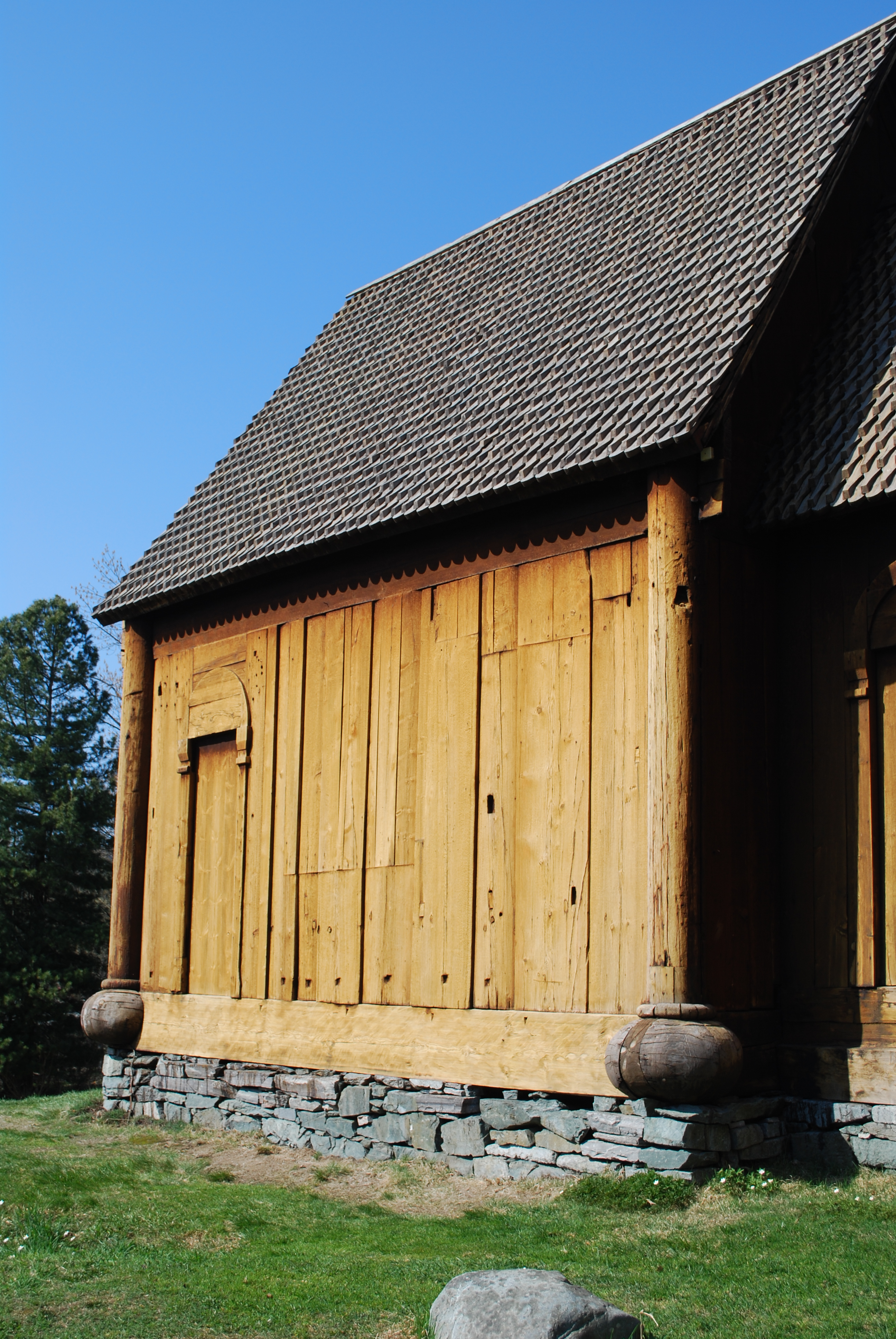
Haltdalen Stave Church at Sverresborg Trøndelag Folkemuseum

Haltdalen Stave Church (Norwegian: Haltdalen stavkyrkje) is a stave church that was originally built in the 1170s in the village of Haltdalen in what is now Holtålen Municipality in Trøndelag county, Norway. The church is now on display at the Sverresborg Trøndelag Folkemuseum in the city of Trondheim. This is a single-nave stave church of the east Scandinavian-style, and it is the only one that is preserved.

== Original church ==
The church originated in Haltdalen, where it served as the parish church. It was probably built in the 1170s. The church was moved to Trondheim during the 1880s. The church was relocated to the Sverresborg Trøndelag Folkemuseum in 1937. The church has been disassembled several times, which has led to repeated repairs. Significant portions of the existing building are original parts that have been preserved for over 800 years. Smaller sections of the building have been rebuilt using newer materials.

The majority of the building comes from the old Haltdalen Church in Haltdalen. That church had been expanded over its history and when the old church was moved to Trondheim, the "new" additions were not kept and the building was restored to its medieval look. This meant that the entire western wall of the building and the western portal needed to be replaced because they were taken down during one of the church additions. Rather than rebuilding from new on that part of the church, the western wall and the portal from the old Ålen stave church were used. That church had been torn down around the same time as this building and they were both similar in age and design.

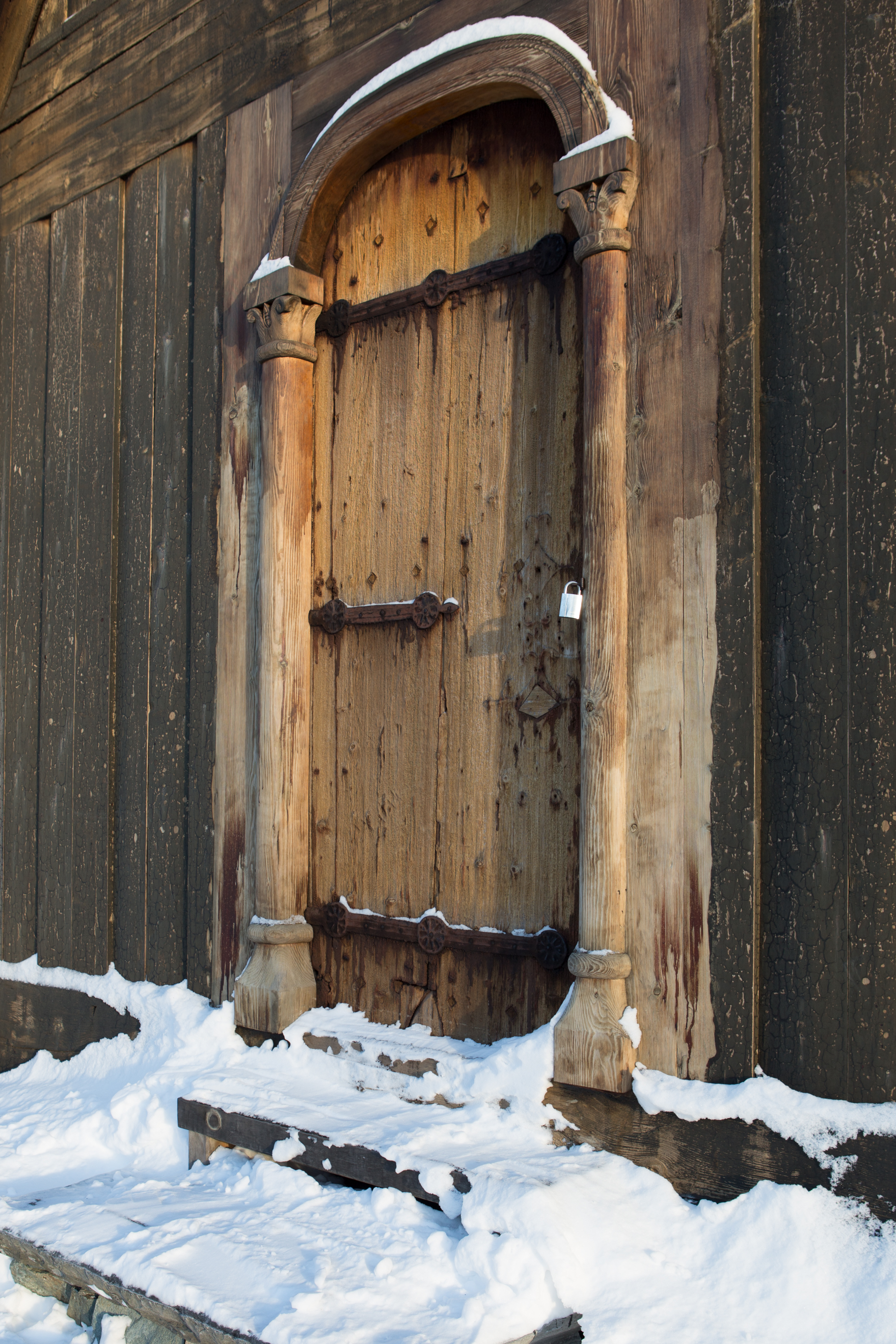
Main entrance

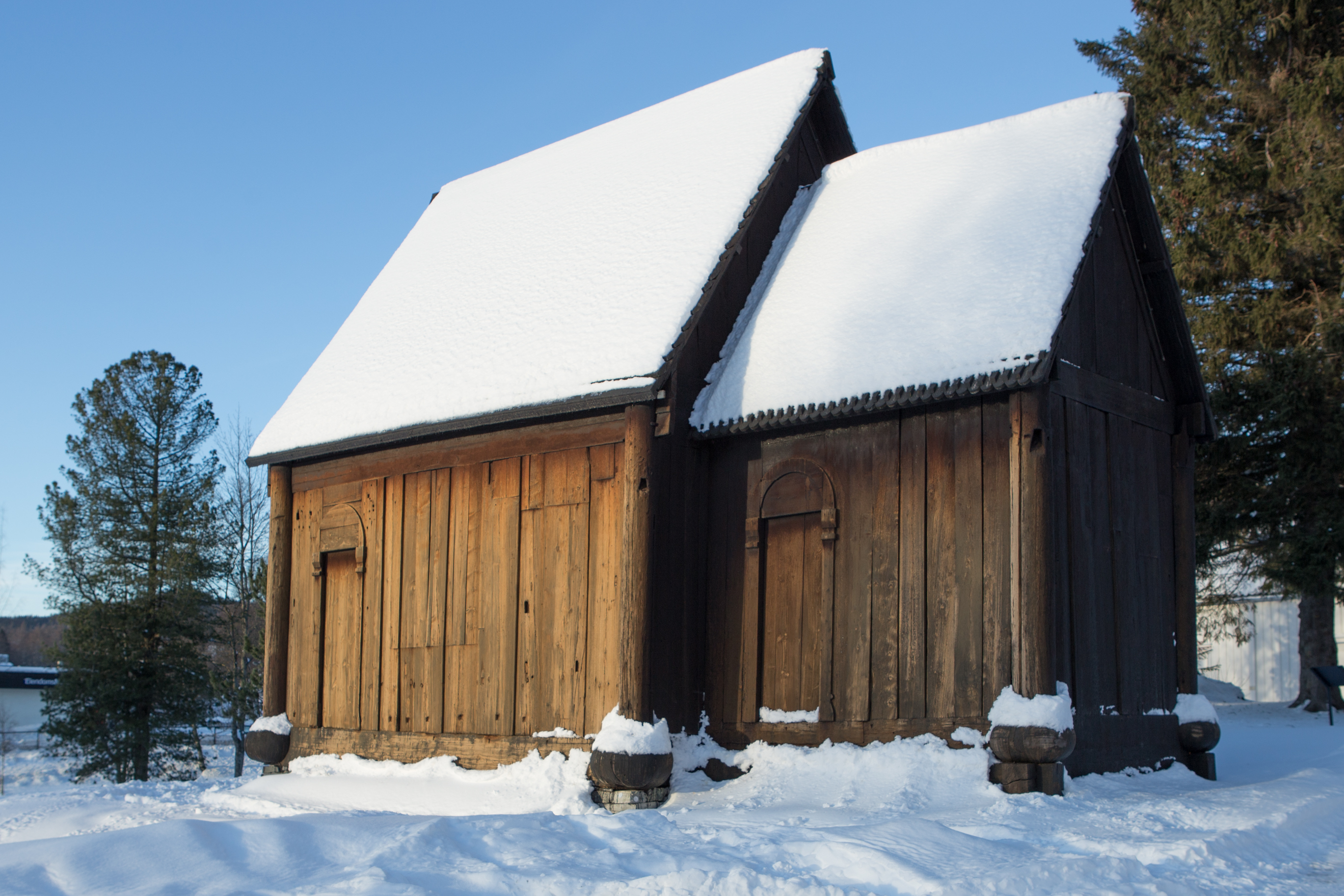
Winter photo

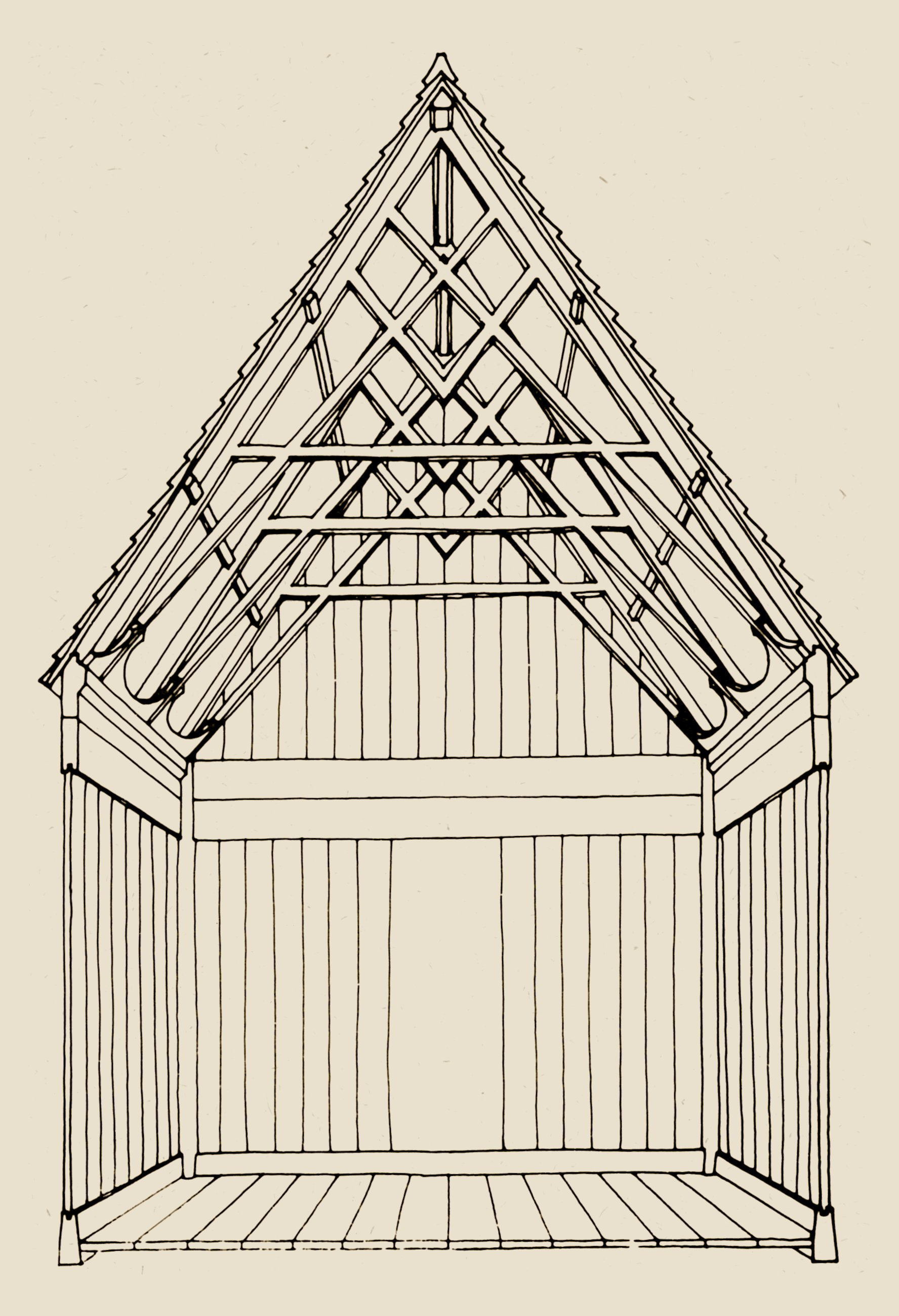
Drawing by Håkon Christie

== Replica in Iceland ==
In commemoration of the one thousandth anniversary of the conversion of Iceland to Christianity, developing a suggestion by the Icelandic government, the Norwegian state presented Iceland with a replica of the Haltdalen church, which was erected by the harbour of Vestmannaeyjabær in the Vestmannaeyjar, in an area formed by the lava of the 1973 eruption of Eldfell. The replica was undertaken by the Norwegian Institute for Cultural Heritage Research as a three-year research and reconstruction project from 1998 to 2000 under the leadership of Elisabeth Seip. The church was constructed in Lom Municipality from materials deliberately drawn widely from around Norway, including timber from Røros, shingles from Odalen, tar from Skjåk, wrought iron from Vågå, and a doorstep from Holtålen. A gallery was added around the outside of the building, inspired by other stave churches, to provide the building with extra strength against the stormy weather of the Vestmannaeyjar. The church was built and consecrated in summer 2000. The project was supported by a Norwegian government grant of 5.5m Norwegian kroner; Icelandic government funding for the redevelopment of the Skansinn area of Vestmannaeyjarbær as a heritage area; and some private sponsorship was also involved, most importantly that the Icelandic company Eimskip shipped the church to Iceland for free.

The replica also includes an altar decorated with a replica of the St Olav frontal, one of the finest surviving medieval Norwegian works of art, undertaken under the leadership of Terje Nordsted.

Replica of the Haltdalen Stave Church in the Vestmannaeyjar

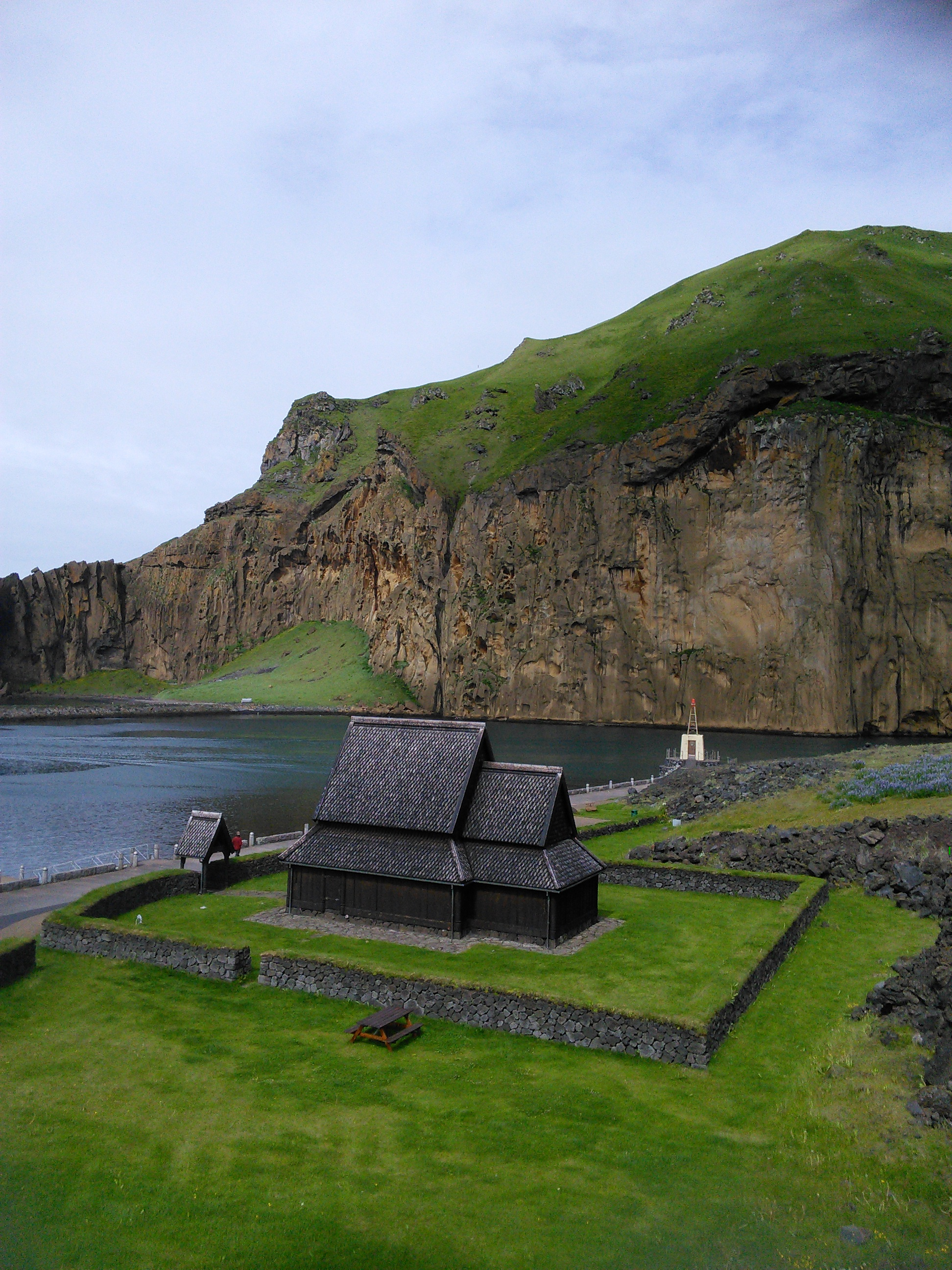
Replica of Haltdalen Stave Church in situ.

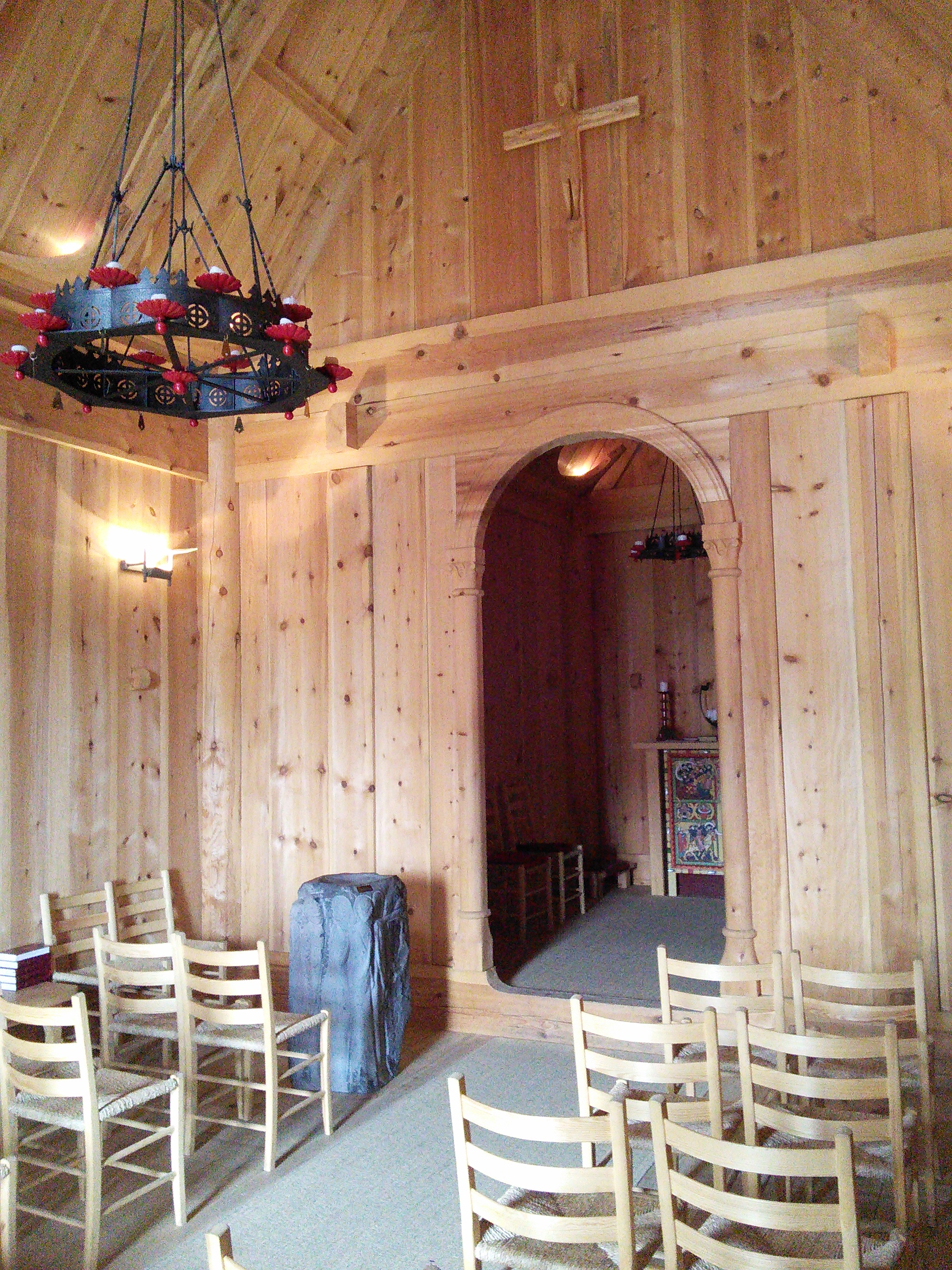
Nave of the church, showing entrance to the choir.

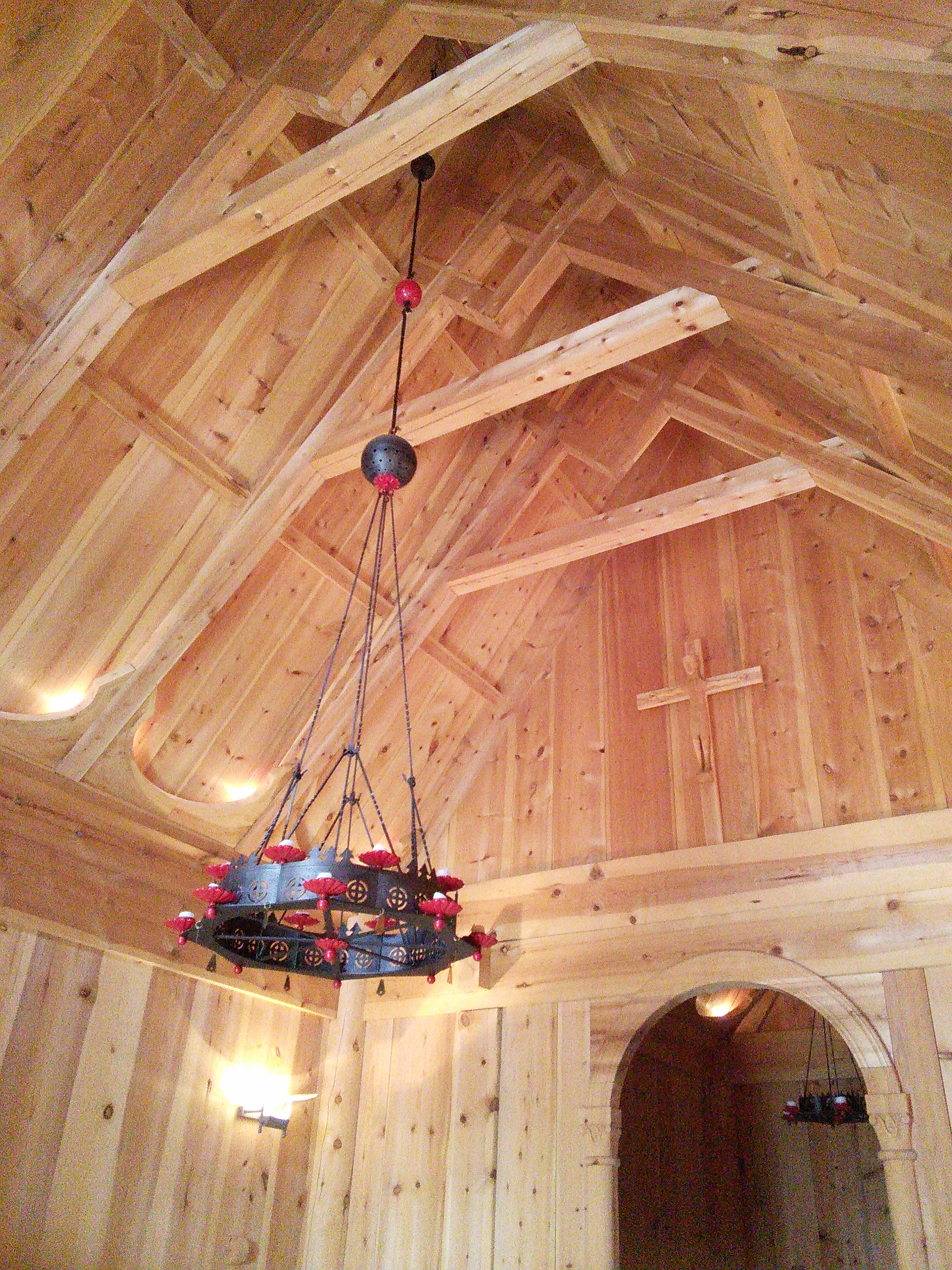
Roof of the nave.

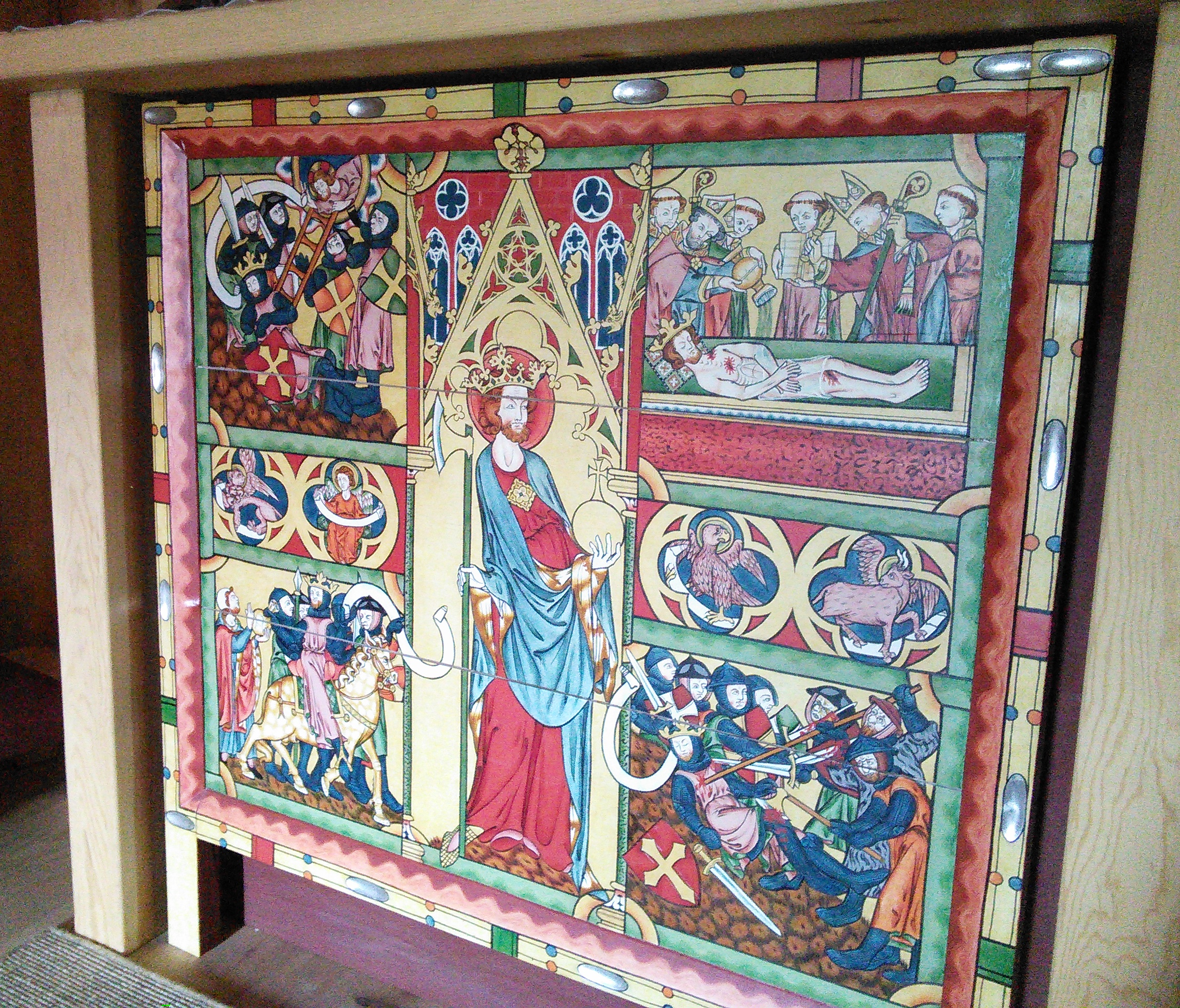
Replica of the St Olav frontal.

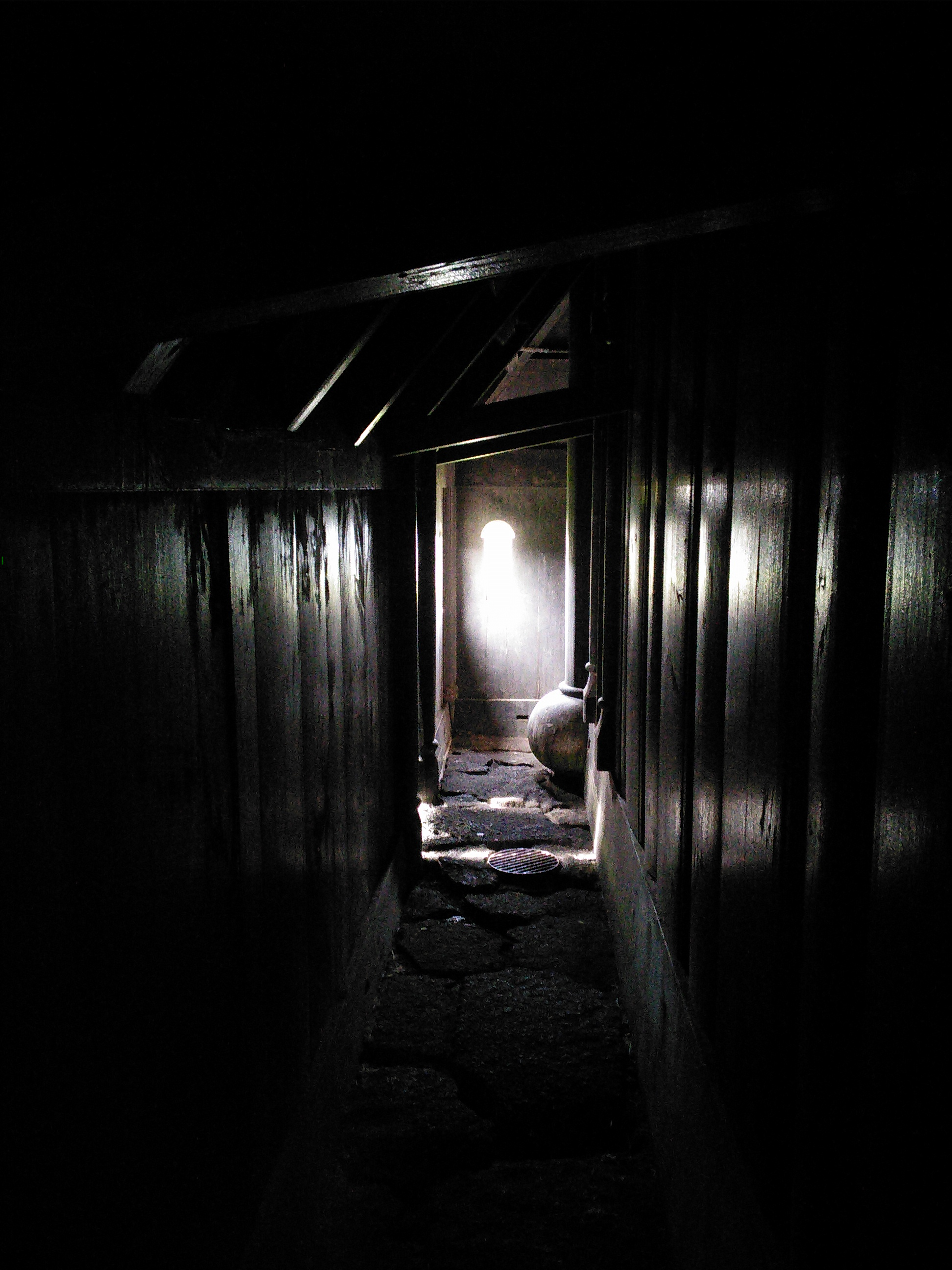
Outer gallery, not in the original church.
