= Holtålen Municipality =

Municipality in Trøndelag, Norway

Holtålen Municipality Holtålen kommune
- Municipality
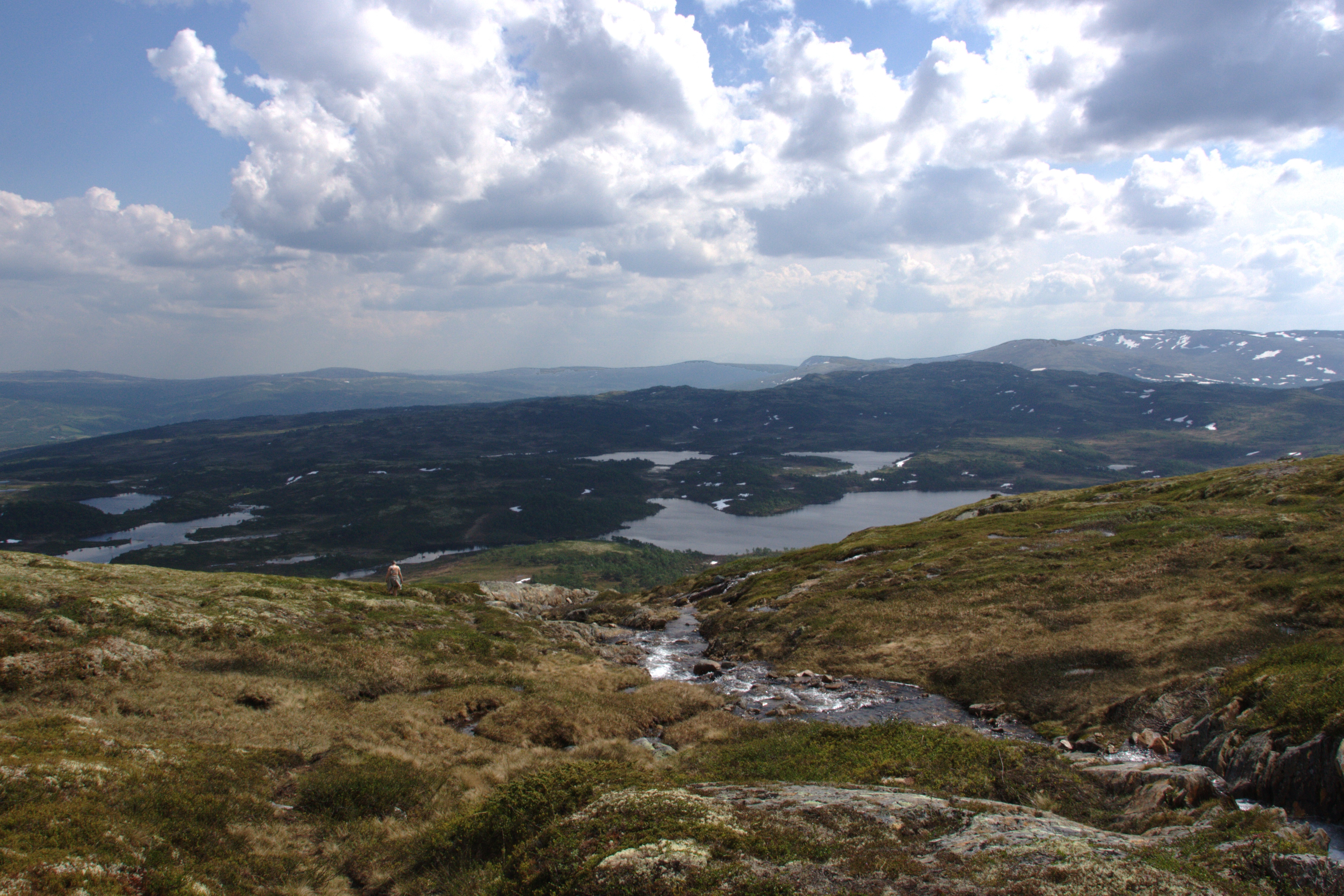
- View of the Båttjønndalen valley in Holtålen

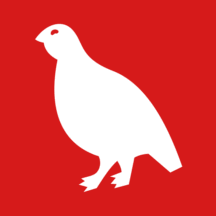
- Flag Coat of arms

- Trøndelag within Norway

- Holtålen within Trøndelag
- Coordinates: 62°52′07″N 11°16′38″E
- Country: Norway
- County: Trøndelag
- District: Gauldal
- Established: 1 Jan 1972
  - Preceded by: Haltdalen Municipality and Ålen Municipality
- Administrative centre: Renbygda/Ålen

Government
  - Mayor (2023): Jan Arild Sivertsgård (Ap)

Area
  - Total: 1,209.58 km^{2} (467.02 sq mi)
  - Land: 1,170.55 km^{2} (451.95 sq mi)
  - Water: 39.03 km^{2} (15.07 sq mi) 3.2%
  - Rank: #89 in Norway
- Highest elevation: 1,320 m (4,330 ft)

Population (2024)
  - Total: 2,035
  - Rank: #280 in Norway
  - Density: 1.7/km^{2} (4.4/sq mi)
  - Change (10 years): ▲ +0.5%
- Demonym: Holtåling

Official language
  - Norwegian form: Neutral
- Time zone: UTC+01:00 (CET)
  - Summer (DST): UTC+02:00 (CEST)
- ISO 3166 code: NO-5026
- Website: Official website

Holtålen is a municipality in Trøndelag county, Norway. It is part of the Gauldalen region. The administrative centre of the municipality is located in the Ålen area of the village of Renbygda. Other villages in the municipality include Hessdalen, Aunegrenda, and Haltdalen.

The 1,210-square-kilometre (470 sq mi) municipality is the 89th largest by area out of the 357 municipalities in Norway. Holtålen Municipality is the 280th most populous municipality in Norway with a population of 2,035. The municipality's population density is 1.7 inhabitants per square kilometre (4.4/sq mi) and its population has increased by 0.5% over the previous 10-year period.

== General information ==
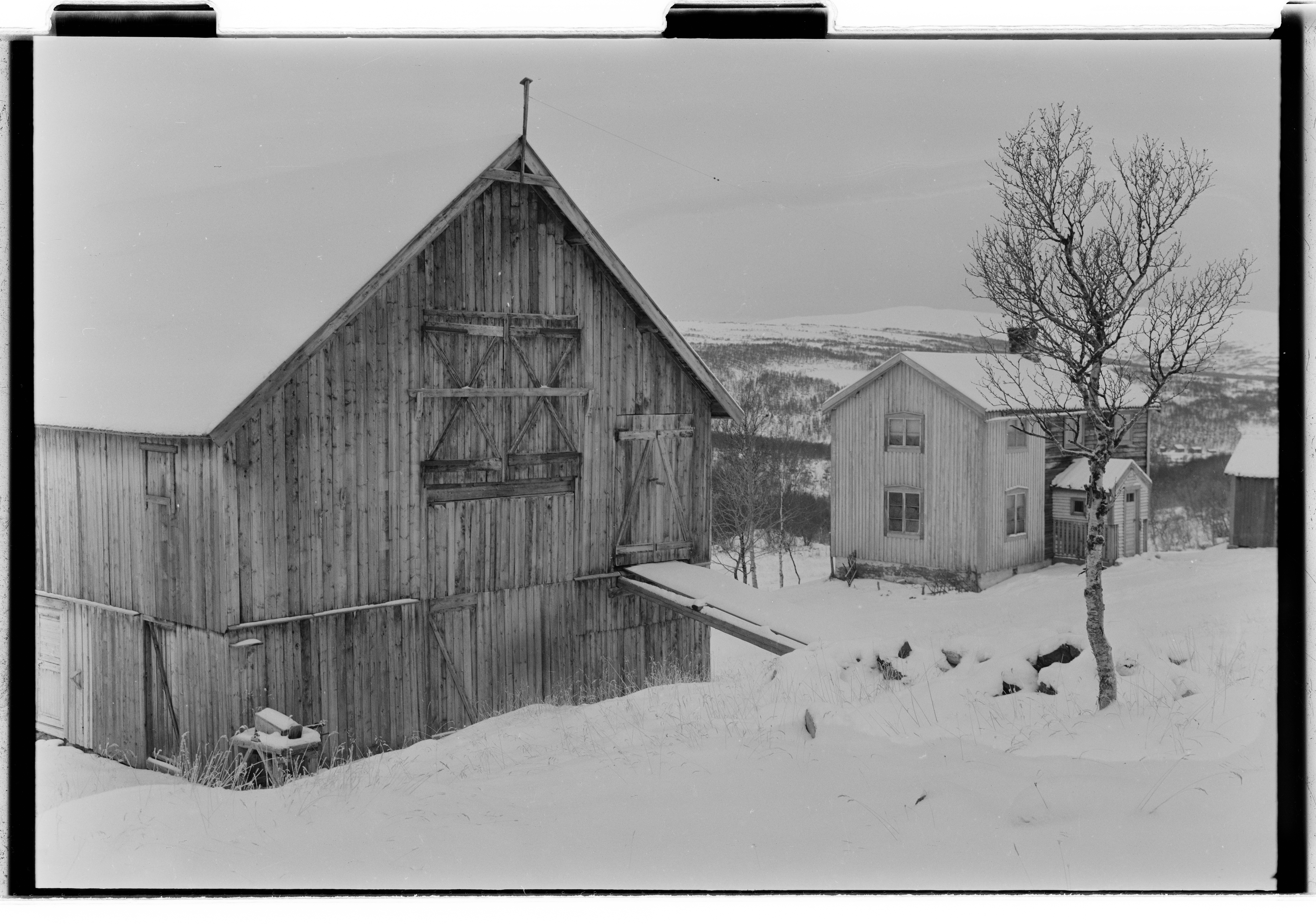
Farm in the Hessdalen valley (c. 1950s)

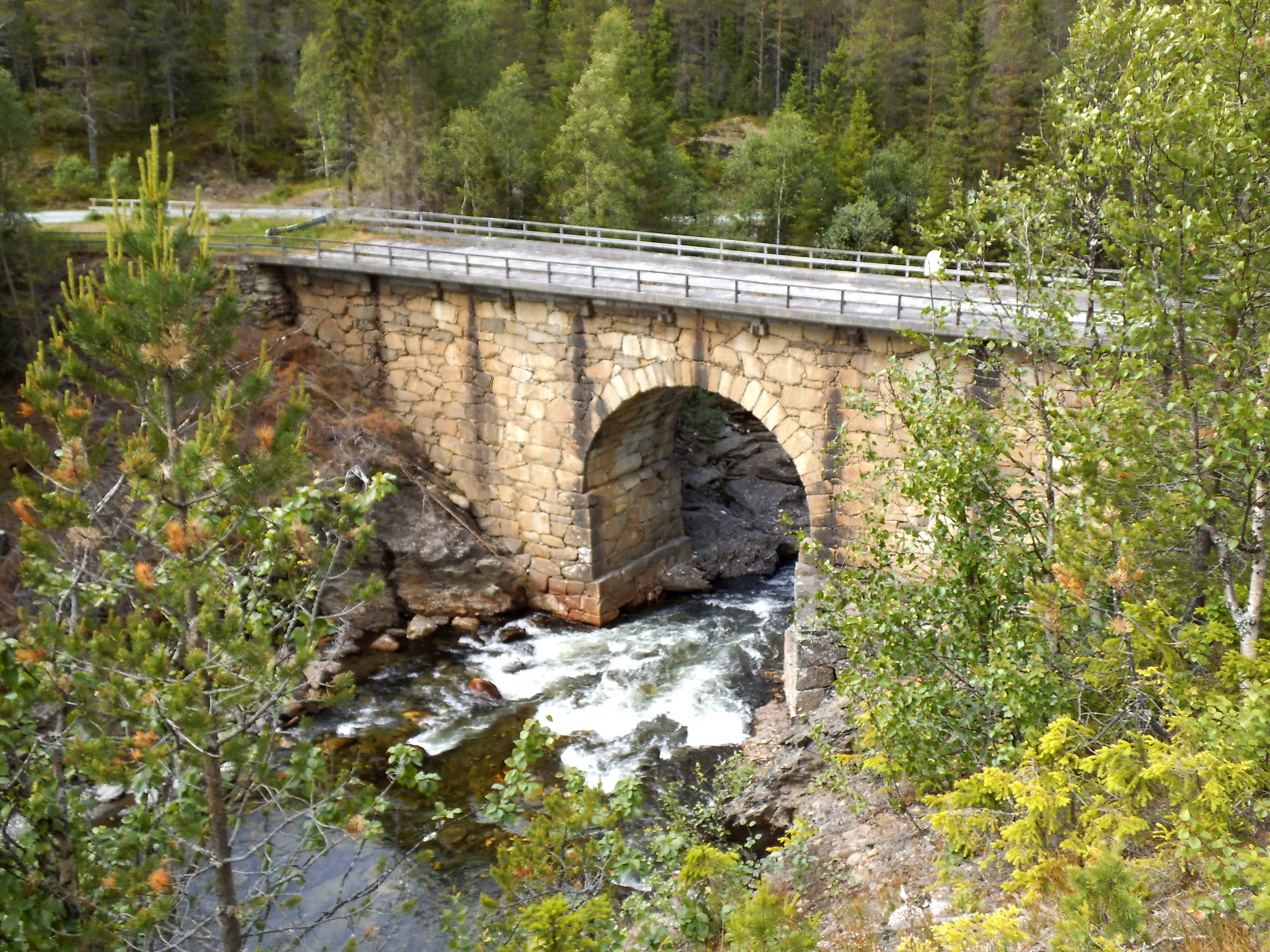
The old, stone Eidet bridge that was built in 1853. It crosses the river Gaula near Hyttfossen.

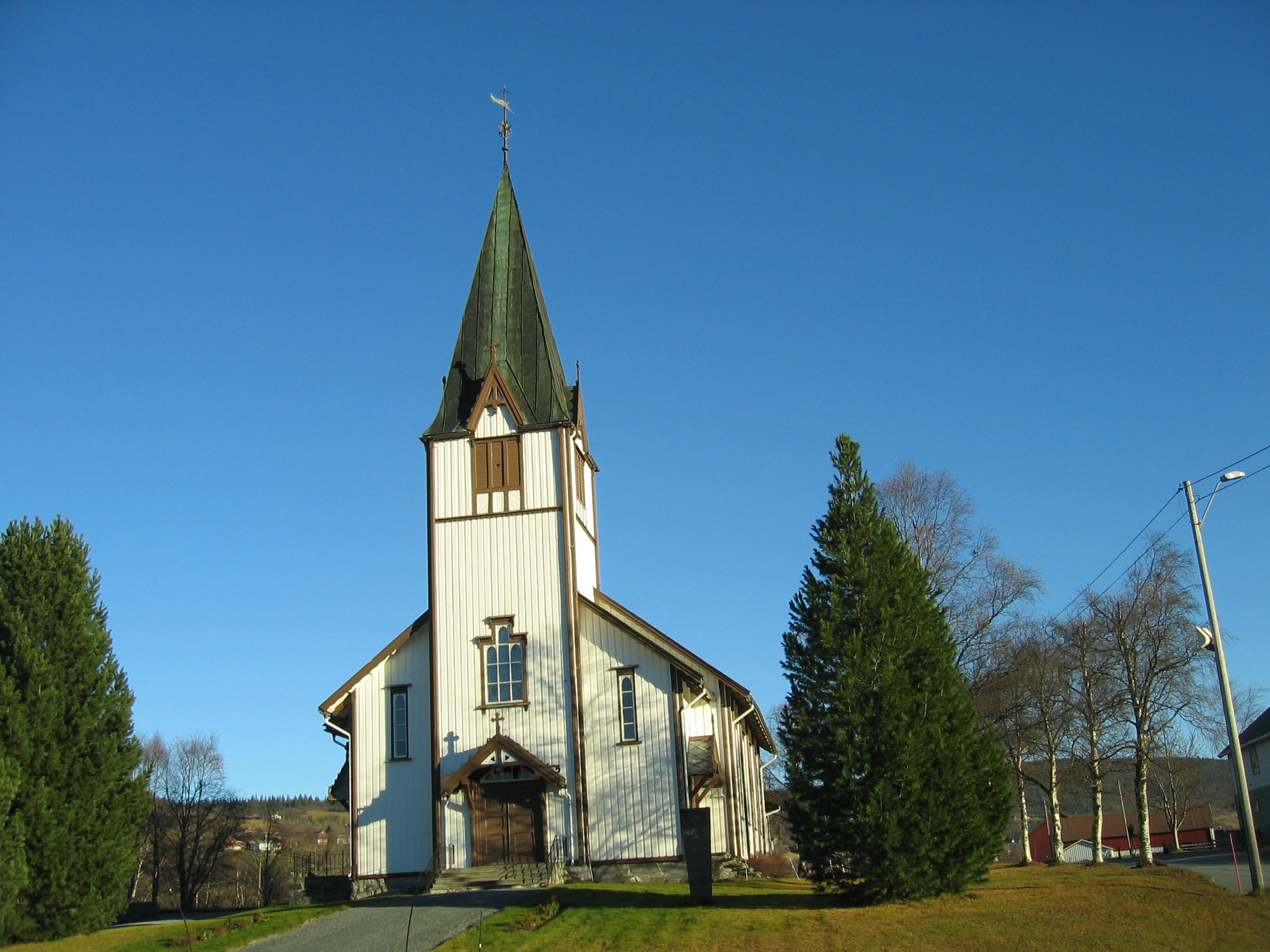
Ålen Church

Starting in the 1960s, there were many municipal mergers across Norway due to the work of the Schei Committee. As a result of this, the municipality of Holtålen was established on 1 January 1972 when the old Haltdalen Municipality (population: 778) was merged with the neighboring Ålen Municipality (population: 1,944) and together they formed the new Holtålen Municipality (bringing back the name Holtålen, the former name for the old Haltdalen Municipality). On 21 April 1989, a small unpopulated part of the neighboring Røros Municipality was transferred to Holtålen Municipality.

On 1 January 2018, the municipality switched from the old Sør-Trøndelag county to the new Trøndelag county.

=== Name ===
The municipality (originally the parish) is named after the local valley (Old Norse: Holtdalr and later Holtáll). The first element is Holt is the old name for the local river Holda. The last element is dalr which means "valley" or "dale". Later, around the year 1400, the suffix changed to áll which means "ditch" or "gully" (ålen is the modern definite form of this word).

=== Coat of arms ===
The coat of arms was granted on 4 March 1988. The official blazon is "Gules, a grouse argent" (Norwegian: I rødt en stående sølv rype). This means the arms have a red field (background) and the charge is a willow ptarmigan (Lagopus lagopus) (a type of grouse). The ptarmigan has a tincture of argent which means it is commonly colored white, but if it is made out of metal, then silver is used. This common local bird was chosen to reflect the importance of hunting in the municipality. The arms were designed by Kari Vårhus Sagen.

=== Churches ===
The Church of Norway has three parishes (sokn) within Holtålen Municipality. It is part of the Gauldal prosti (deanery) in the Diocese of Nidaros.

Churches in Holtålen Municipality
Parish (sokn)	Church name	Year built	Location of the church
Haltdalen	Haltdalen Church	1881	Haltdalen
Haltdalen	Haltdalen Stave Church	1170	Sverresborg**
Haltdalen	Aunegrenda Chapel	1952	Aunegrenda
Hessdalen	Hessdalen Church	1940	Hessdalen
Ålen	Ålen Church	1881	Renbygda
**This church was moved to a museum in Trondheim Municipality, but was originally in Haltdalen.

== Geography ==
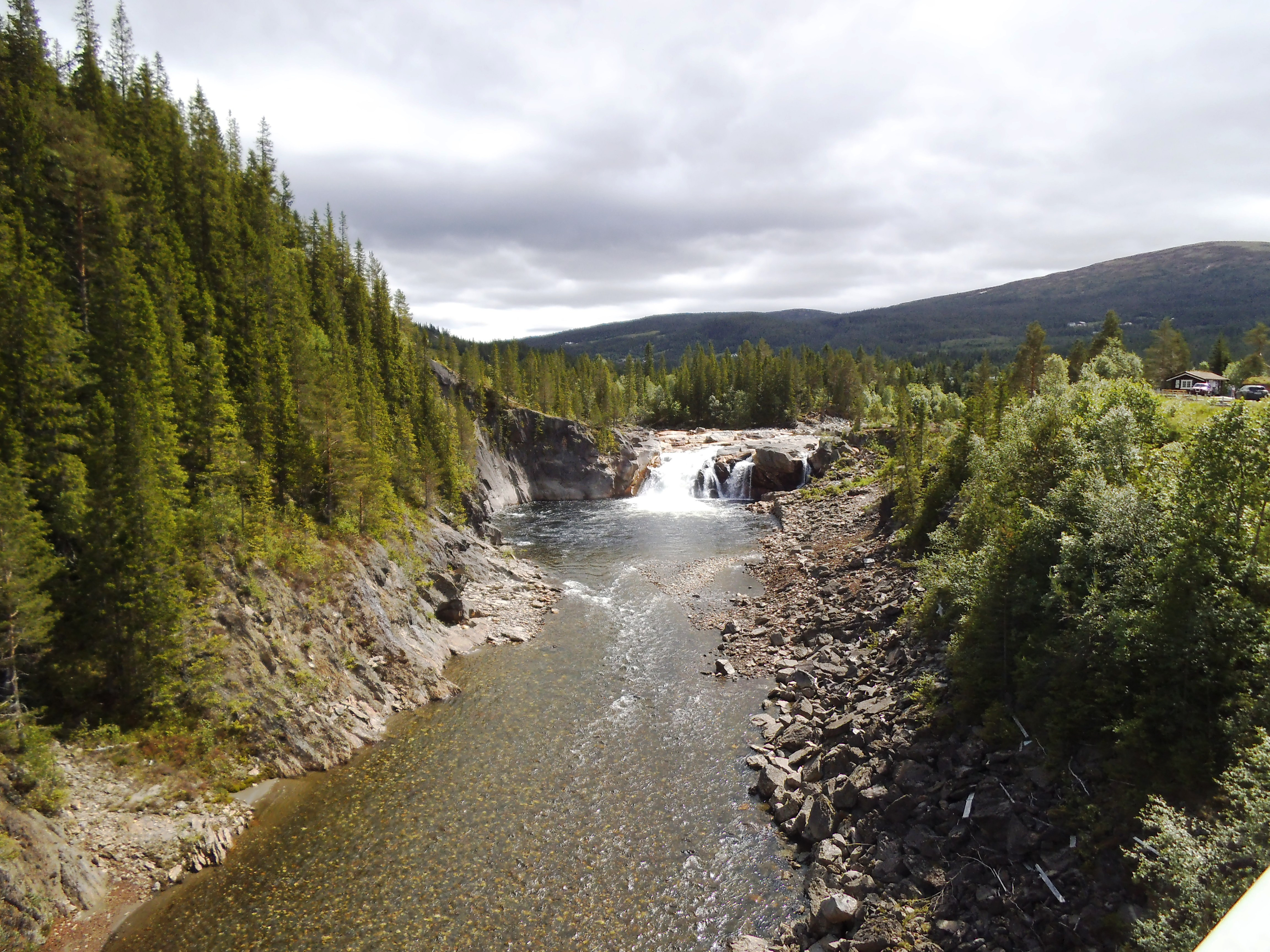
View of the Eafossen waterfall

The Gauldalen valley with the river Gaula originates from the mountainous area near the mining town of Røros, about 35 kilometres (22 mi) south of Renbygda, which is listed as a World Heritage Site. At the village of Renbygda the deep Gauldalen valley disappears into the mountains, not far from the lake Riasten.

The western part of Holtålen is where the Forollhogna National Park is located. The lake Øyungen lies just outside the park. The highest point in the municipality is the 1,320-metre (4,330 ft) tall mountain Forollhogna that is located within the national park. The mountain is a tripoint border with Midtre Gauldal Municipality and Os Municipality.

The Kjøli and Killingdal copper mines are located in the southeastern part of Holtålen. The last mine in production was Killingdal until it closed down in 1986.

Hessdalen is a mountain valley joining the Gauldal valley close to the village of Renbygda. Around 1983, Hessdalen became famous for UFO observations and the Hessdalen lights. Because of this the Hessdalen AMS station was founded in the valley.

The Rørosbanen railway line runs through the municipality, stopping at the Ålen Station and Haltdalen Station.

== Government ==
Holtålen Municipality is responsible for primary education (through 10th grade), outpatient health services, senior citizen services, welfare and other social services, zoning, economic development, and municipal roads and utilities. The municipality is governed by a municipal council of directly elected representatives. The mayor is indirectly elected by a vote of the municipal council. The municipality is under the jurisdiction of the Trøndelag District Court and the Frostating Court of Appeal.

=== Municipal council ===
The municipal council (Kommunestyre) of Holtålen Municipality is made up of 11 representatives that are elected to four-year terms. The tables below show the current and historical composition of the council by political party.

Holtålen kommunestyre 2023–2027
Party name (in Norwegian)	Number of representatives
Labour Party (Arbeiderpartiet)	5
Centre Party (Senterpartiet)	2
Future Holtålen (Framtida Holtålen)	4
Total number of members:	11

Holtålen kommunestyre 2019–2024
Party name (in Norwegian)	Number of representatives
Labour Party (Arbeiderpartiet)	7
Pensioners' Party (Pensjonistpartiet)	1
Centre Party (Senterpartiet)	4
Future Holtålen (Framtida Holtålen)	3
Total number of members:	15

Holtålen kommunestyre 2015–2019
Party name (in Norwegian)	Number of representatives
Labour Party (Arbeiderpartiet)	7
Conservative Party (Høyre)	1
Socialist Left Party (Sosialistisk Venstreparti)	1
Joint list of the Centre Party (Senterpartiet) and the Liberal Party (Venstre)	6
Total number of members:	15

Holtålen kommunestyre 2011–2015
Party name (in Norwegian)	Number of representatives
Labour Party (Arbeiderpartiet)	8
Conservative Party (Høyre)	4
Socialist Left Party (Sosialistisk Venstreparti)	1
Joint list of the Centre Party (Senterpartiet), Christian Democratic Party (Kristelig Folkeparti), and Liberal Party (Venstre)	8
Total number of members:	21

Holtålen kommunestyre 2007–2011
Party name (in Norwegian)	Number of representatives
Labour Party (Arbeiderpartiet)	11
Socialist Left Party (Sosialistisk Venstreparti)	2
Joint list of the Conservative Party (Høyre), Christian Democratic Party (Kristelig Folkeparti), Centre Party (Senterpartiet), and Liberal Party (Venstre)	8
Total number of members:	21

Holtålen kommunestyre 2003–2007
Party name (in Norwegian)	Number of representatives
Labour Party (Arbeiderpartiet)	12
Joint list of the Conservative Party (Høyre), Christian Democratic Party (Kristelig Folkeparti), Centre Party (Senterpartiet), and Liberal Party (Venstre)	9
Total number of members:	21

Holtålen kommunestyre 1999–2003
Party name (in Norwegian)	Number of representatives
Labour Party (Arbeiderpartiet)	11
Socialist Left Party (Sosialistisk Venstreparti)	3
Holtålen List (Holtålenlista)	7
Total number of members:	21

Holtålen kommunestyre 1995–1999
Party name (in Norwegian)	Number of representatives
Labour Party (Arbeiderpartiet)	12
Conservative Party (Høyre)	1
Centre Party (Senterpartiet)	4
Socialist Left Party (Sosialistisk Venstreparti)	2
Holtålen local list (Holtålen Bygdeliste)	2
Total number of members:	21

Holtålen kommunestyre 1991–1995
Party name (in Norwegian)	Number of representatives
Labour Party (Arbeiderpartiet)	11
Socialist Left Party (Sosialistisk Venstreparti)	4
Joint list of the Conservative Party (Høyre), Christian Democratic Party (Kristelig Folkeparti), and Centre Party (Senterpartiet)	4
Local list for Holtålen (Bygdaliste for Holtålen)	2
Total number of members:	21

Holtålen kommunestyre 1987–1991
Party name (in Norwegian)	Number of representatives
Labour Party (Arbeiderpartiet)	13
Socialist Left Party (Sosialistisk Venstreparti)	3
Joint list of the Conservative Party (Høyre), Christian Democratic Party (Kristelig Folkeparti), and Centre Party (Senterpartiet)	5
Total number of members:	21

Holtålen kommunestyre 1983–1987
Party name (in Norwegian)	Number of representatives
Labour Party (Arbeiderpartiet)	14
Conservative Party (Høyre)	1
Socialist Left Party (Sosialistisk Venstreparti)	3
Joint list of the Centre Party (Senterpartiet) and the Christian Democratic Party (Kristelig Folkeparti)	3
Total number of members:	21

Holtålen kommunestyre 1979–1983
Party name (in Norwegian)	Number of representatives
Labour Party (Arbeiderpartiet)	13
Conservative Party (Høyre)	1
Socialist Left Party (Sosialistisk Venstreparti)	2
Joint list of the Centre Party (Senterpartiet), Christian Democratic Party (Kristelig Folkeparti), and Liberal Party (Venstre)	5
Total number of members:	21

Holtålen kommunestyre 1975–1979
Party name (in Norwegian)	Number of representatives
Labour Party (Arbeiderpartiet)	13
Socialist Left Party (Sosialistisk Venstreparti)	2
Joint list of the Centre Party (Senterpartiet) and the Christian Democratic Party (Kristelig Folkeparti)	6
Total number of members:	21

Holtålen kommunestyre 1972–1975
Party name (in Norwegian)	Number of representatives
Labour Party (Arbeiderpartiet)	15
Christian Democratic Party (Kristelig Folkeparti)	2
Joint List(s) of Non-Socialist Parties (Borgerlige Felleslister)	3
Local List(s) (Lokale lister)	1
Total number of members:	21

=== Mayors ===
The mayor (Norwegian: ordfører) of Holtålen is the political leader of the municipality and the chairperson of the municipal council. Here is a list of people who have held this position:

- 1972–1975: Arne Wolden (Ap)
- 1976–1979: Olav Myran (Ap)
- 1980–1991: Håvard Moen (Ap)
- 1991–2011: Ivar Volden (Ap)
- 2011–2015: Heidi Greni (Sp)
- 2015–2019: Jan Håvard Refsethås (Sp)
- 2019–2023: Arve Hitterdal (LL)
- 2023–present: Jan Arild Sivertsgård (Ap)

== Notable people ==
- Mons Lie (1757 in Ålen – 1827), a police chief, writer, and songwriter
- Hans Bull Brodtkorb Mohr (1886 in Haltdalen – 1973), an educator and international cooperation activist
- Anders Bjørgaard (1891 in Holtålen – 1967), an illustrator of the comic series Jens von Bustenskjold
- Kåre Prytz (1926 in Ålen – 1994), a journalist and novelist
