= Hessdalen =

Village in Holtålen Municipality, Norway

- Village
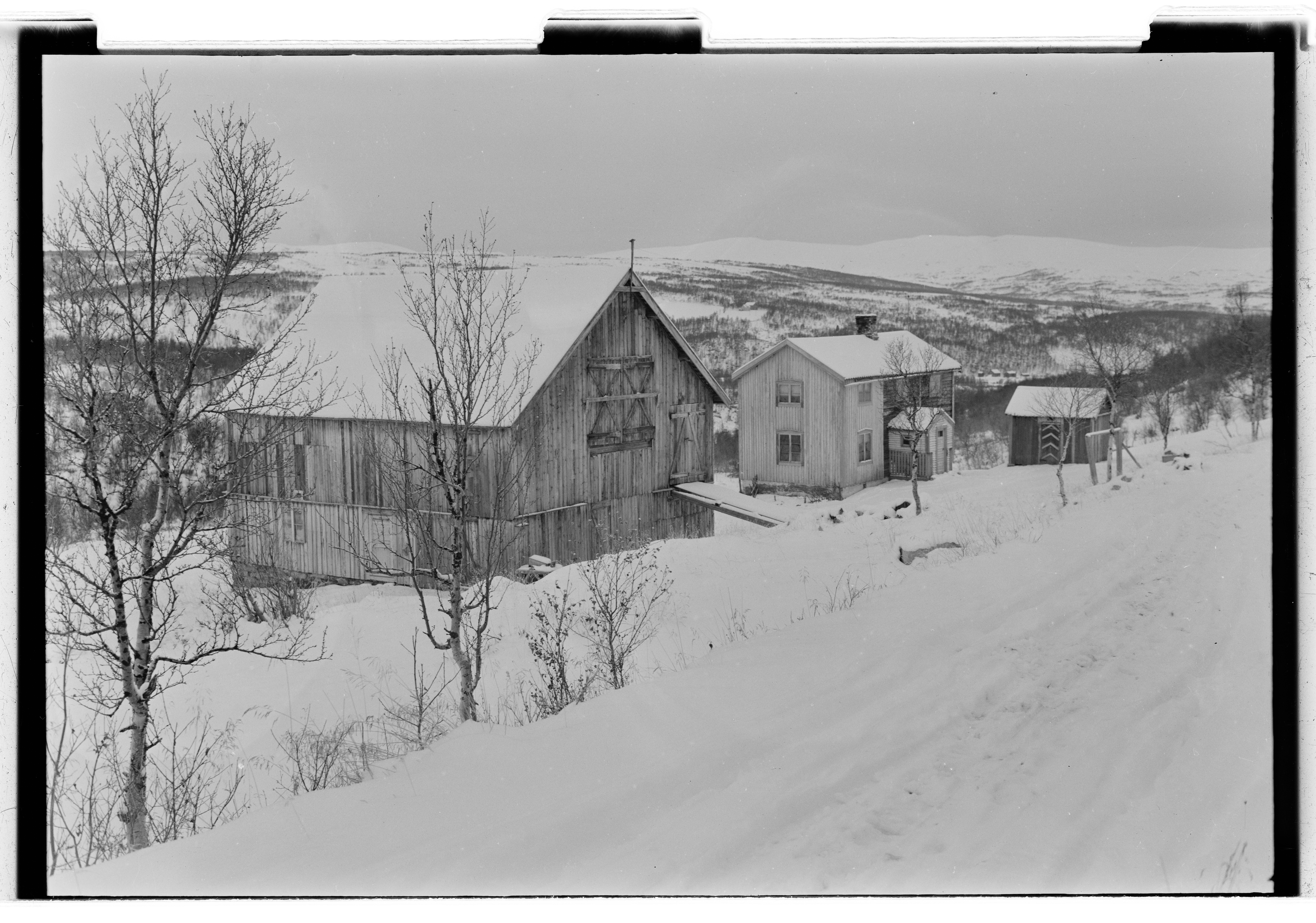
- View of the village
- Interactive map of Hessdalen
- Location within Trøndelag Location within Norway
- Coordinates: 62.7933°N 11.1883°E
- Country: Norway
- Region: Central Norway
- County: Trøndelag
- District: Gauldalen
- Municipality: Holtålen Municipality
- Elevation: 617 m (2,024 ft)
- Time zone: UTC+01:00 (CET)
  - Summer (DST): UTC+02:00 (CEST)
- Post Code: 7380 Ålen

Hessdalen is a village in Holtålen Municipality in Trøndelag county, Norway. Hessdalen also refers to the 15-kilometre (9.3 mi) long valley that surrounds the village. Hessdalen is located in the central part of the valley, approximately 120 kilometres (75 mi) south of the city of Trondheim, approximately 35 kilometres (22 mi) north of the mining town of Røros, and about 12 kilometres (7.5 mi) southwest of the village of Renbygda. About 150 people live in the village and surrounding valley.

Hessdalen Church is located in the village of Hessdalen and the lake Øyungen lies about 7 kilometres (4.3 mi) southwest of the village. The Hessdalen area is known for the occurrence of unexplained aerial luminous phenomena called the Hessdalen lights. The phenomenon is monitored by the Hessdalen AMS.

== Name ==
The first element is the name of the local river Hesja and the last element is the definite form of dal, which means "dale" or "valley".
