= Hessdalen AMS =

Observation station in the Hessdalen area, Norway

Coordinates: 62°49′17″N 11°12′7″E

The Hessdalen Automatic Measurement Station (or Hessdalen AMS) is an automatically working observation station in the Hessdalen area in Holtålen Municipality in Trøndelag county, Norway. It is used for registering Hessdalen lights. It has been in service since 7 August 1998, and it is equipped with a magnetometer, two black and white TV cameras, and one colour TV camera.

As the equipment of the station is located in a blue container, it is also known as Blue Box.

The AMS regularly registers light phenomena. Since it only measures a restricted numbers of parameters, it is not able to explain all the recordings.

== See also ==
- Østfold University College
- Ghost lights
