= Haltdalen Church =

Church in Trøndelag, Norway

- Haltdalen kirke
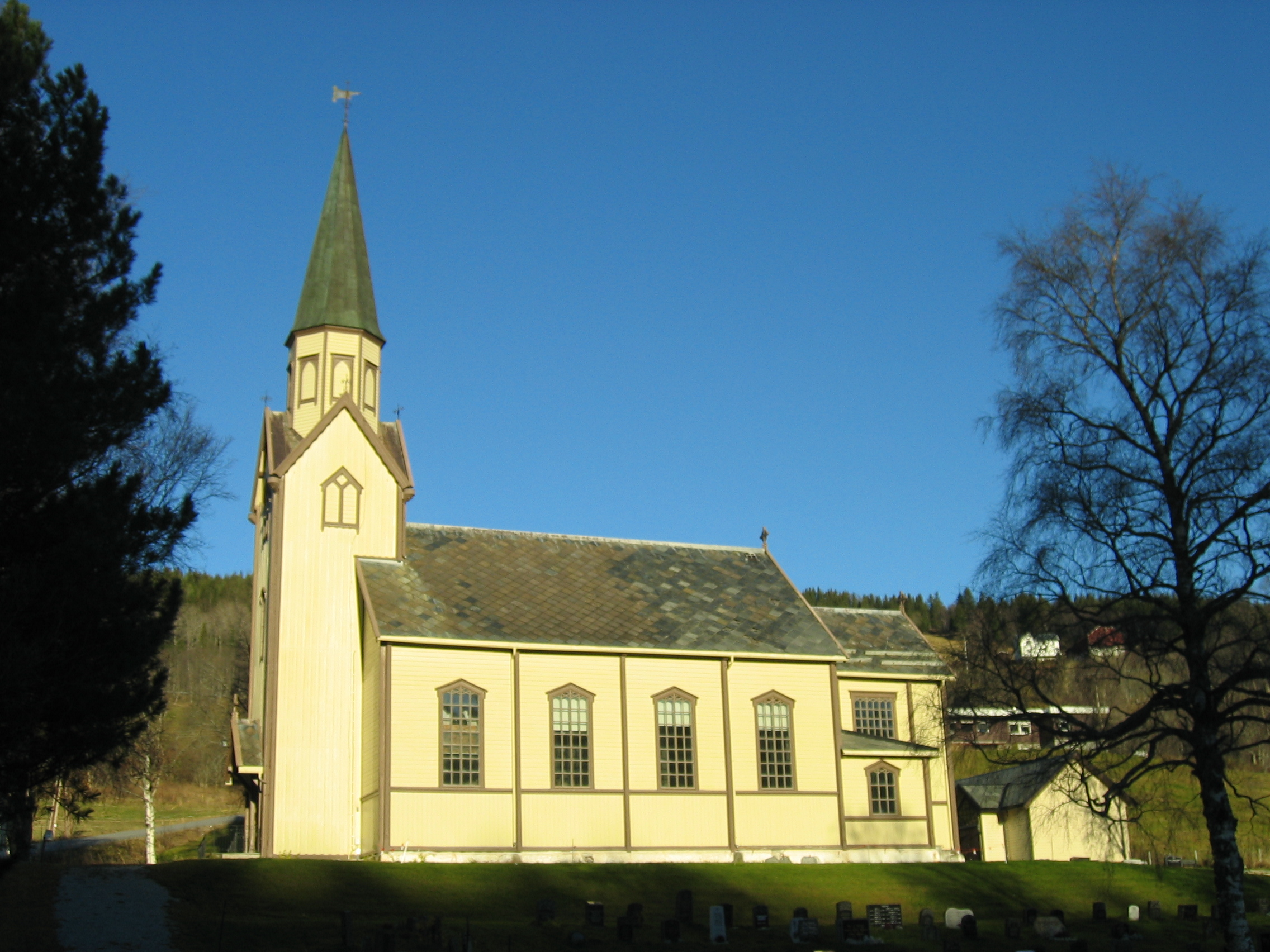
- View of the church
- Haltdalen Church
- 62.92629470°N 11.145491749°E
- Location: Holtålen Municipality, Trøndelag
- Country: Norway
- Denomination: Church of Norway
- Churchmanship: Evangelical Lutheran

History
- Status: Parish church
- Founded: 12th century
- Consecrated: 1881

Architecture
- Functional status: Active
- Architect(s): Jacob Digre and Gustav Olsen
- Architectural type: Long church
- Style: Neo-Gothic
- Completed: 1881 (145 years ago)

Specifications
- Capacity: 300
- Materials: Wood

Administration
- Diocese: Nidaros bispedømme
- Deanery: Gauldal prosti
- Parish: Haltdalen
- Norwegian Cultural Heritage Site
- Type: Church
- Status: Automatically protected
- ID: 84470

Haltdalen Church (Norwegian: Haltdalen kirke) is a parish church of the Church of Norway in Holtålen Municipality in Trøndelag county, Norway. It is located in the village of Haltdalen. It is the main church for the Haltdalen parish which is part of the Gauldal prosti (deanery) in the Diocese of Nidaros. The light yellow, wooden church was built in a neo-Gothic, long church style in 1881 using plans drawn up by the architects Jacob Digre and Gustav Olsen. The church seats about 300 people.

== History ==
The earliest existing historical records of the church date back to the year 1533, but the church was not new that year. The first church in Haltdalen was a stave church and it was located about 100 metres (330 ft) south of the present location of the church. The 37-square-metre (400 sq ft) church had a rectangular nave and a narrower, rectangular chancel. The whole building was encircled by a corridor. Style features and dendrochronological analyses show that the church was likely built in the 12th century, possibly around the year 1170.

In 1703, the parish priest complained that the church in Haltdalen was "ancient and completely worthless" and also too small for the rapidly growing congregation. Soon after (possibly in 1704), the church was enlarged considerably. A new timber-framed nave was built and the old nave was converted into a choir and the old choir was converted into a sacristy.

In 1814, this church served as an election church (Norwegian: valgkirke). Together with more than 300 other parish churches across Norway, it was a polling station for elections to the 1814 Norwegian Constituent Assembly which wrote the Constitution of Norway. This was Norway's first national elections. Each church parish was a constituency that elected people called "electors" who later met together in each county to elect the representatives for the assembly that was to meet at Eidsvoll Manor later that year.

In 1881, a new long church was constructed on a site about 100 metres (330 ft) north of the centuries-old church. After the new church was completed, the old church was closed and sold to the Society for the Preservation of Ancient Norwegian Monuments. From 1882-1883, the old church was disassembled and moved to the grounds of the Norwegian University of Science and Technology where they were rebuilt as a museum. The church was reconstructed in its original medieval form, so the "new" nave from 1704 was not included. This meant that the western wall of the "old" part of the church was missing. To fix this gap in materials, a new western gable wall was built with new materials and a medieval portal and door were taken from the old Ålen Stave Church (which had recently been closed and replaced). There were also parts of the newly rebuilt choir that come from the old church in Ålen. Together this newly reconstructed museum church was known as the Haltdalen Stave Church since the majority of the building was the old Haltdalen Church. In 1937, the whole church was again disassembled and moved to a new open-air museum in Sverresborg, just outside the city of Trondheim.

In 2004, a brand new copy of the pre-1703 church was built on the south side of the Haltdalen cemetery, a short distance north of its historic location. The new church was consecrate on 29 August 2004. This church is used as a museum and it looks very similar to the medieval look of the original church. It is owned by a local foundation and it has about 45 seats. It is used occasionally for services such as one on Olsok each year.

== See also ==
- List of churches in Nidaros
