= Riasten =

Lake in Holtålen, Norway

- Interactive map of the lake
- Location: Holtålen Municipality, Trøndelag
- Coordinates: 62.8452°N 11.7657°E
- Basin countries: Norway
- Max. length: 5 kilometres (3.1 mi)
- Max. width: 1.5 kilometres (0.93 mi)
- Surface area: 5.14 km^{2} (1.98 sq mi)
- Shore length^{1}: 16 kilometres (9.9 mi)
- Surface elevation: 805 metres (2,641 ft)
- References: NVE
- ^{1} Shore length is not a well-defined measure.

Riasten is a lake in Holtålen Municipality in Trøndelag county, Norway. The 5.14-square-kilometre (1.98 sq mi) lake lies near the municipal border with the neighboring Tydal Municipality and Røros Municipality, about 25 kilometres (16 mi) east of the village of Renbygda. The lake lies about 15 kilometres (9.3 mi) west of the border with Sweden.

== See also ==
- List of lakes in Norway
