= Jacob Digre =

Norwegian architect and builder

- Born: 1811; Klæbu, Norway
- Died: 1891 (aged 79–80); Trondheim, Norway
- Occupation: Architect
- Children: Johan Digre

Jacob Digre (1811–1891) was a Norwegian architect and builder. Digre's firm was one of the largest construction companies in Northern Norway. He built and designed several monumental buildings in Trondheim including Hjorten, Frimurerlogen, Britannia Hotel, and Mathesongården as well as a number of churches in central and northern Norway.

Digre was the son of Lars Larsen Digre and Brynhild Paulsøn Stavlund. He was married on 1 December 1843 to Anne Kristine Dahl at the Nidaros Cathedral in Trondheim. They had five children including Johan Digre, their first born child.

Digre started as a carpenter at the shipyard in Trondheim. In 1838, he established his own building company. In 1862, he bought Einar Gram's plant in Ila. Later, the plant was expanded with its own sawmill, carpentry factory, and architectural drawing office. After a fire in 1876, the plant was rebuilt and modernized. His son Johan Digre was an architect for the company, but after his death Karl Norum became the company's architect. After Jacob Digre's death in 1891, the sons Ludvig Bernhard Digre and Johannes Digre continued running the company. In 1904, the company was transformed into a limited company. In 1927 the company was closed down.

Digre designed several wooden churches in Norway including Ålen Church, Haltdalen Church, Edøy Church, and Mosvik Church.
