= Øyungen =

Lake in Holtålen, Norway

- Interactive map of the lake
- Location: Holtålen Municipality, Trøndelag
- Coordinates: 62.7468°N 11.0530°E
- Primary inflows: Gardåa
- Primary outflows: Storhesja
- Basin countries: Norway
- Max. length: 3.5 kilometres (2.2 mi)
- Max. width: 3.5 kilometres (2.2 mi)
- Surface area: 6.13 km^{2} (2.37 sq mi)
- Shore length^{1}: 21 kilometres (13 mi)
- Surface elevation: 786 metres (2,579 ft)
- References: NVE
- ^{1} Shore length is not a well-defined measure.

Øyungen is a lake in Holtålen Municipality in Trøndelag county, Norway. The 6.13-square-kilometre (2.37 sq mi) lake lies about 7 kilometres (4.3 mi) southwest of the village of Hessdalen. The Forollhogna National Park surrounds the lake on three sides.

== Name ==
The first part of the name is øy which means "island". The last element -ungen (Old Norse: -ungr) is a common suffix in names of lakes in Norway, for instance Kaldungen (meaning "the lake with cold water"), Svartungen (meaning "the black lake", Leirungen (meaning "the lake with clay"), and Sandungen (meaning "the lake with sand"). The lake Øyungen contains several small islets.

== See also ==
- List of lakes in Norway
