= Mosvik Church =

Church in Trøndelag, Norway

- Mosvik kirke
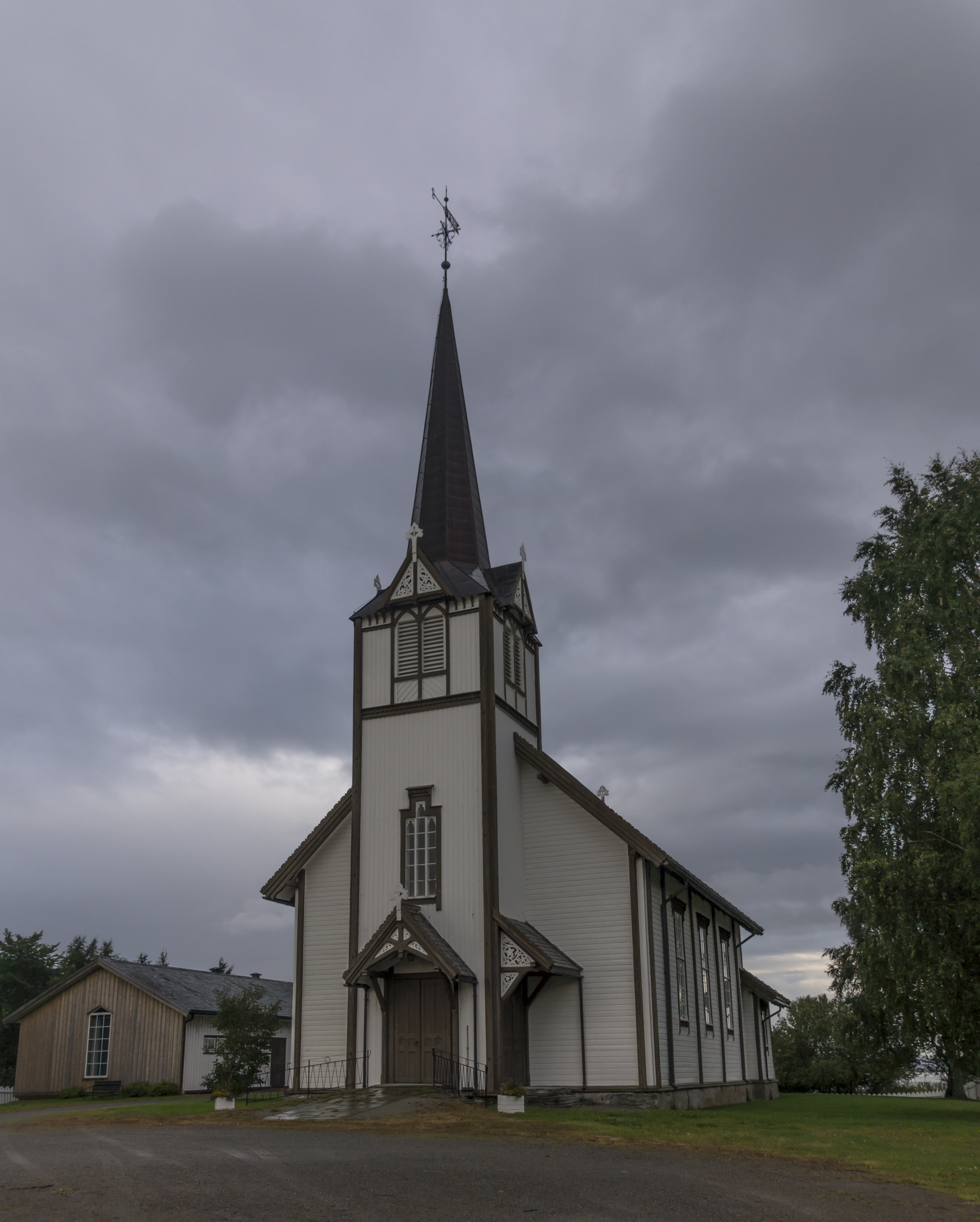
- Mosvik Church
- 63.81820967°N 10.99285394°E
- Location: Inderøy Municipality, Trøndelag
- Country: Norway
- Denomination: Church of Norway
- Churchmanship: Evangelical Lutheran

History
- Status: Parish church
- Founded: 13th century
- Consecrated: 20 Aug 1844

Architecture
- Functional status: Active
- Architect: Jacob Digre
- Architectural type: Long church
- Style: Gothic
- Completed: 1844 (182 years ago)

Specifications
- Capacity: 360
- Materials: Wood

Administration
- Diocese: Nidaros bispedømme
- Deanery: Stiklestad prosti
- Parish: Mosvik
- Norwegian Cultural Heritage Site
- Type: Church
- Status: Not protected
- ID: 85074

Mosvik Church (Norwegian: Mosvik kirke) is a parish church of the Church of Norway in Inderøy Municipality in Trøndelag county, Norway. It is located in the village of Mosvik. It is one of the churches for the Mosvik parish which is part of the Stiklestad prosti (deanery) in the Diocese of Nidaros. The white, wooden church was built in a Gothic long church style in 1884 using plans drawn up by the architect Jacob Digre. The church seats about 360 people.

== History ==
The earliest existing historical records of the church date back to the year 1533, but the church was likely built around the year 1250. The first church was a stave church and it was located about 85 metres (279 ft) southwest of the present site of the church. The old church was quite tall with a high roof line. In 1652, the choir and eastern portion of the nave were torn down and rebuilt. By the 1880s, the old church was described as very old and dark In 1884, a new church was built 85 metres (279 ft) northeast of the old church by the lead builder, Hans Kunig. The new church was consecrated on 20 August 1844. After the new church was completed, the old church was torn down.

== See also ==
- List of churches in Nidaros
