= Ålen Church =

Church in Trøndelag, Norway

- Ålen kirke
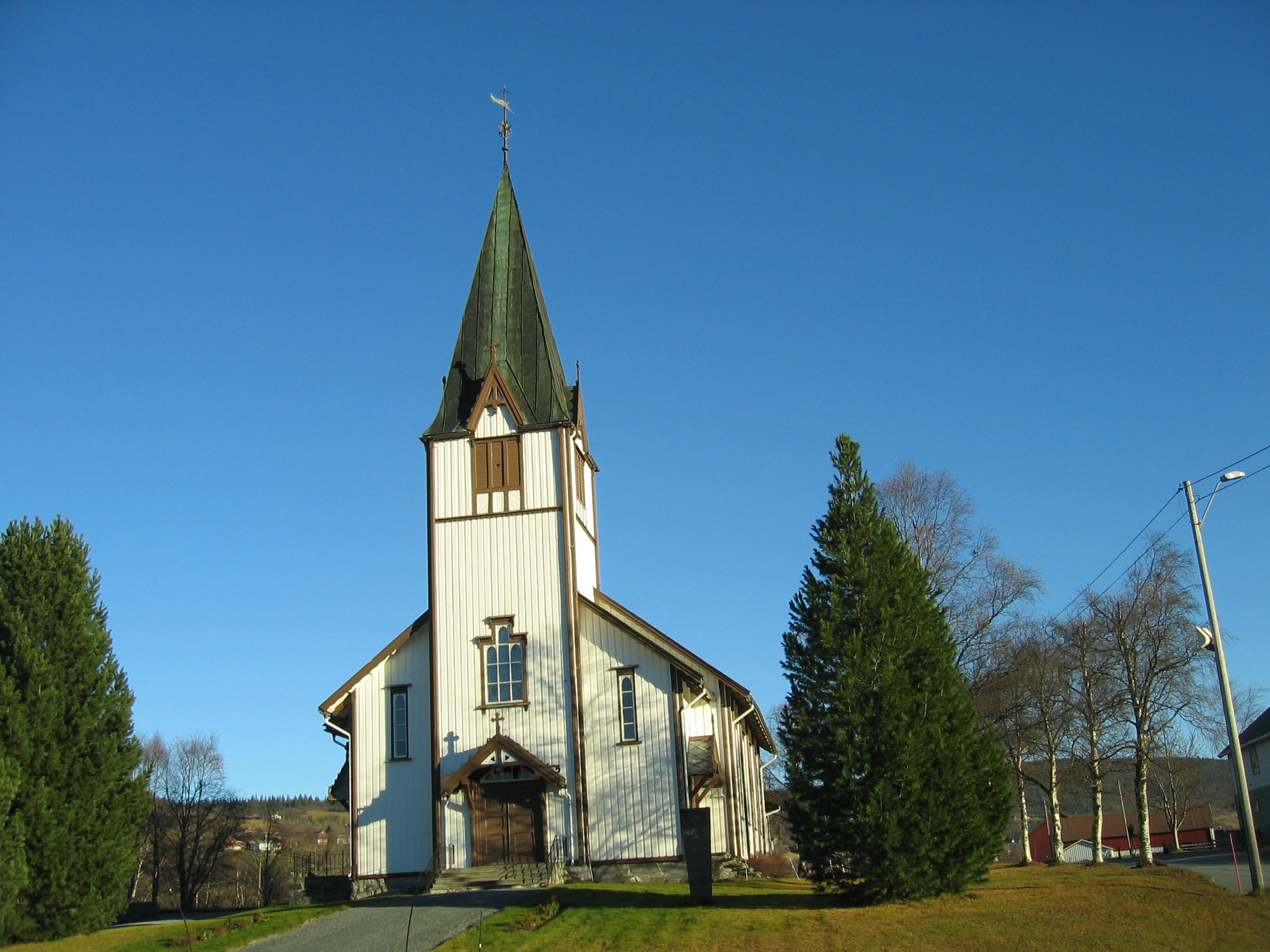
- View of the church
- Ålen Church
- 62.843812785°N 11.285026967°E
- Location: Holtålen Municipality, Trøndelag
- Country: Norway
- Denomination: Church of Norway
- Churchmanship: Evangelical Lutheran

History
- Status: Parish church
- Founded: 12th century
- Consecrated: 15 Sept 1881

Architecture
- Functional status: Active
- Architect: Jacob Digre
- Architectural type: Long church
- Style: Neo-Gothic
- Completed: 1881 (145 years ago)

Specifications
- Capacity: 322
- Materials: Wood

Administration
- Diocese: Nidaros bispedømme
- Deanery: Gauldal prosti
- Parish: Ålen
- Norwegian Cultural Heritage Site
- Type: Church
- Status: Listed
- ID: 85957

Ålen Church (Norwegian: Ålen kirke) is a parish church of the Church of Norway in Holtålen Municipality in Trøndelag county, Norway. It is located in the village of Renbygda. It is the church for the Ålen parish which is part of the Gauldal prosti (deanery) in the Diocese of Nidaros. The white, wooden church was built in a neo-Gothic long church style in 1881 using plans drawn up by the architect Jacob Digre. The church seats about 322 people.

== History ==
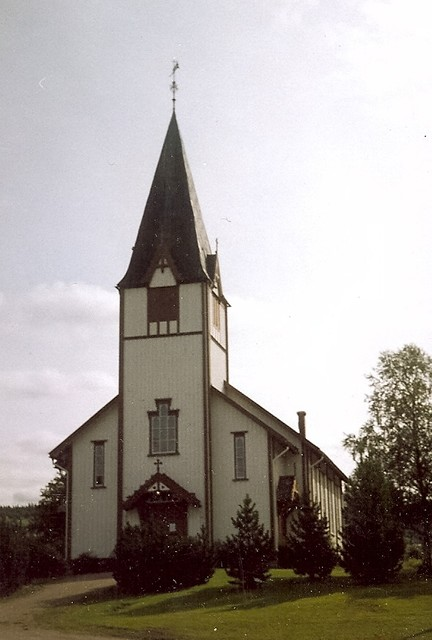
View of the front of the church

The earliest existing historical records of the church date back to the year 1381, but the church was not new that year. The first church in Ålen was a stave church that was located about 80 metres (260 ft) northwest of the present day church site (roughly the middle of the cemetery). The church was likely first built in the 12th century. The stave church had a rectangular nave with a narrower, rectangular chancel. The total floor plan was approximately 62 square metres (670 sq ft) which was close to double what the old Haltdalen Stave Church had.

From 1674 to 1676, the church was significantly expanded by adding a new timber-framed nave to the old stave church. The old nave from the older church was converted into the new chancel. The old chancel was remodeled as a new sacristy. Additionally, the church had a cross-arm (transept) added to the north side of the new nave.

In 1881, a new church was constructed about 80 metres (260 ft) to the southeast of the old stave church. The church was designed by Johan Digre. It was consecrated on 15 September 1881. After the new church was completed, the old church was mostly torn down. The only part that was saved was the small entry porch which originally had been built around 1675. Some of the interior decor elements from the old church were saved and sent to museum in Trondheim. The pulpit from 1705 and an altarpiece from the 17th century were later sent to the newly built Hessdalen Church in 1940.

== See also ==
- List of churches in Nidaros
