= Aunegrenda Chapel =

Church in Trøndelag, Norway

- Aunegrenda kapell
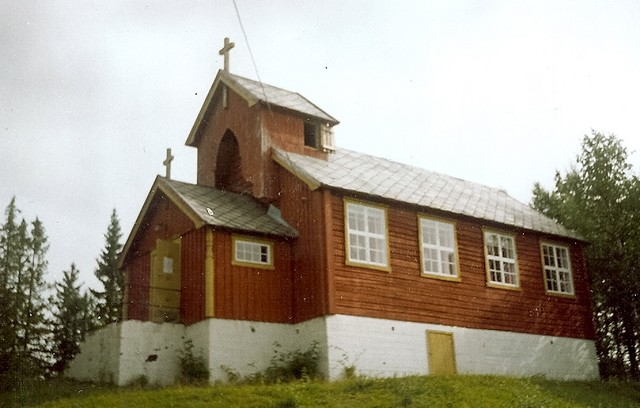
- View of the church
- Aunegrenda Chapel
- 62.952741125°N 11.255831122°E
- Location: Holtålen Municipality, Trøndelag
- Country: Norway
- Denomination: Church of Norway
- Churchmanship: Evangelical Lutheran

History
- Status: Chapel
- Founded: 1952
- Consecrated: 1952

Architecture
- Functional status: Active
- Architect(s): Morgenstierne & Eide
- Architectural type: Long church
- Completed: 1952 (74 years ago)

Specifications
- Capacity: 120
- Materials: Wood

Administration
- Diocese: Nidaros bispedømme
- Deanery: Gauldal prosti
- Parish: Haltdalen
- Norwegian Cultural Heritage Site
- Type: Church
- Status: Not protected
- ID: 83811

Aunegrenda Chapel (Norwegian: Aunegrenda kapell) is a chapel in the Holtålen Municipality of Trøndelag county, Norway, in the village of Aunegrenda. It an annex chapel for Haltdalen parish, part of the Gauldal prosti (deanery) in the Diocese of Nidaros. The brown wooden building was built in a long church design in 1952 using plans drawn by the architectural firm Morgenstierne & Eide. It seats about 120 people.

== See also ==
- List of churches in Nidaros
