= Hessdalen Church =

Church in Trøndelag, Norway

- Hessdalen kirke
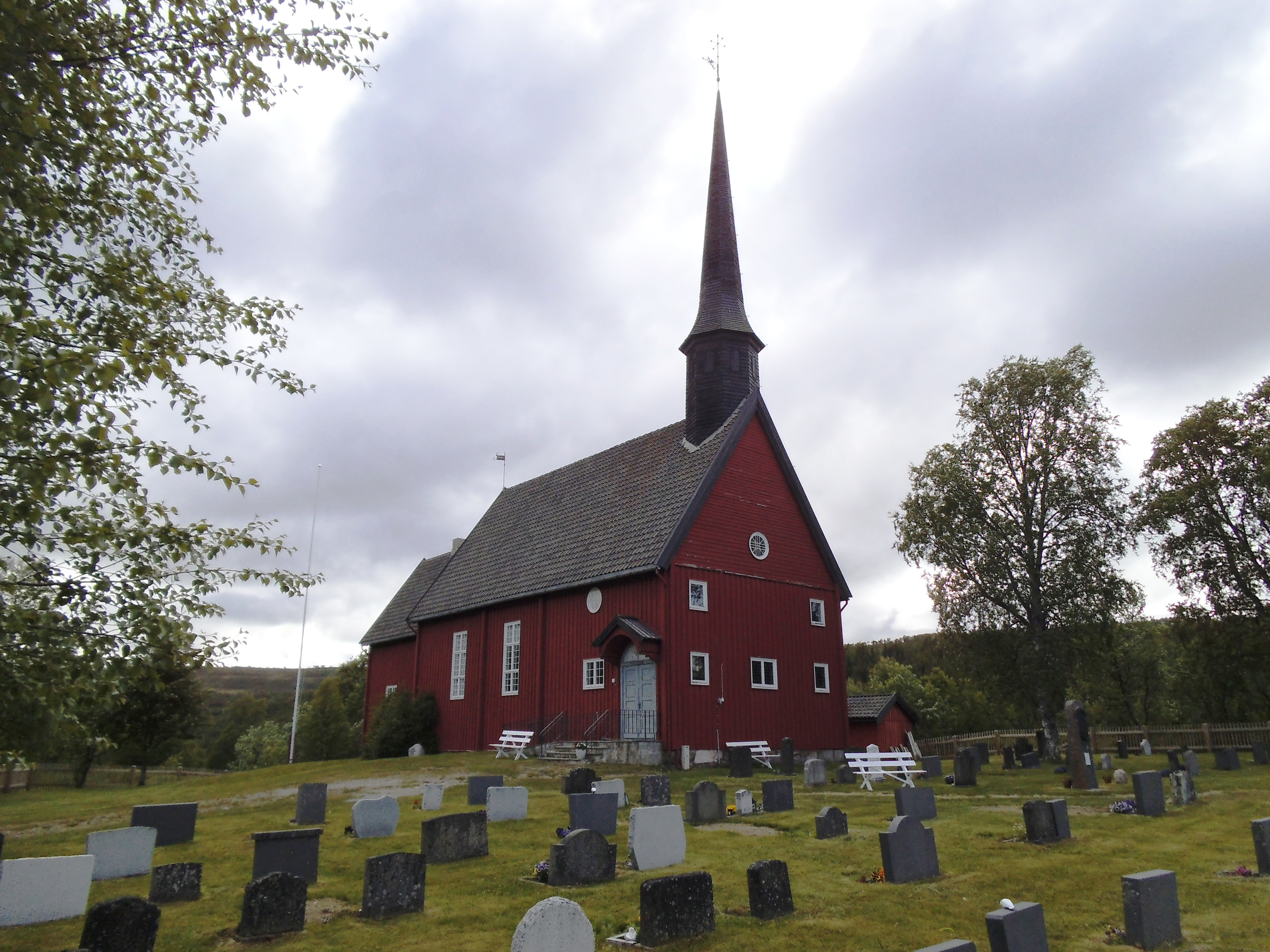
- View of the church
- Hessdalen Church
- 62.79066172493°N 11.181191951°E
- Location: Holtålen Municipality, Trøndelag
- Country: Norway
- Denomination: Church of Norway
- Churchmanship: Evangelical Lutheran

History
- Status: Parish church
- Founded: 1940
- Consecrated: 3 July 1949

Architecture
- Functional status: Active
- Architect: John Egil Tverdahl
- Architectural type: Long church
- Completed: 1940 (86 years ago)

Specifications
- Capacity: 186
- Materials: Wood

Administration
- Diocese: Nidaros bispedømme
- Deanery: Gauldal prosti
- Parish: Hessdalen
- Norwegian Cultural Heritage Site
- Type: Church
- Status: Not protected
- ID: 84569

Hessdalen Church (Norwegian: Hessdalen kirke) is a parish church of the Church of Norway in Holtålen Municipality in Trøndelag county, Norway. It is located in the village of Hessdalen. It is the church for the Hessdalen parish which is part of the Gauldal prosti (deanery) in the Diocese of Nidaros. The red, wooden church was built in a long church style in 1940 using plans drawn up by the architect John Egil Tverdahl. The church seats about 186 people.

== History ==
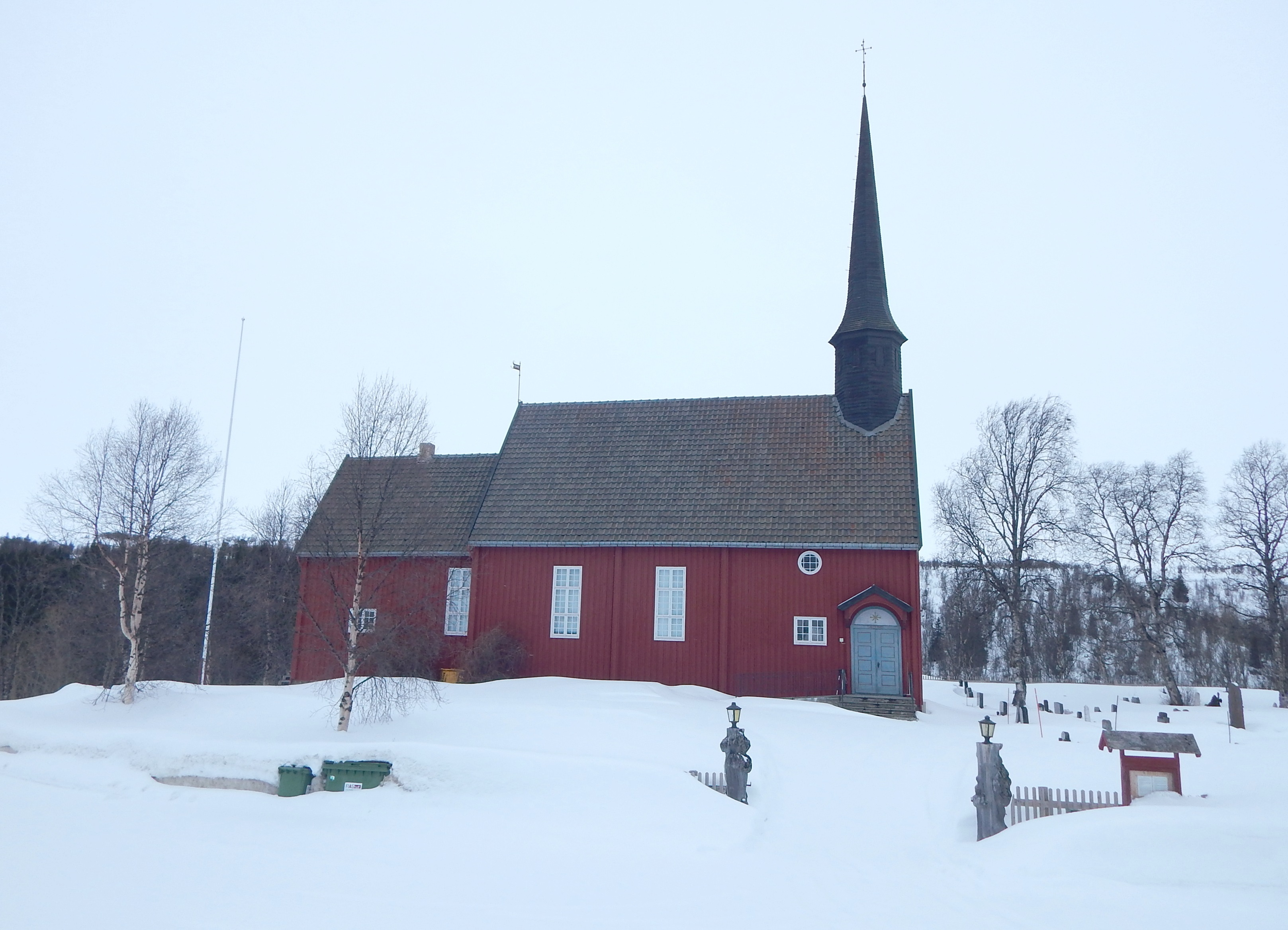
Side view of the church

Hessdalen is a fairly remote mountain valley with only one road connecting the valley to the rest of the municipality. The Hessdalen valley got its own cemetery in 1905, and the parish priest was required to meet twice a year at the new cemetery to perform funerals. Soon after, the people of the valley began requesting a chapel to go along with the new cemetery. During the 1930s, planning began for a new chapel. Around 1940 the chapel was constructed, but it was not fully finished until 1942, likely due to the effects of World War II. The architect of the new building was John Egil Tverdahl and Arne S. Gynnild was the lead builder. It was not until 3 July 1949 that the new chapel was formally consecrated. Even after the consecration, there was still some remaining work that needed to be finished to complete the new building. The chapel builders had limited financial resources, but they obtained the pulpit from the old Ålen Church, which had been stored on the Støvne farm after the church had been torn down. The owner had bought it at auction when the church was torn down. The altarpiece is from the 17th century and it too was from the old stave church in Ålen.

== See also ==
- List of churches in Nidaros
