= Aunegrenda =

Village in Holtålen Municipality, Norway

- Village
- Interactive map of Aunegrenda
- Location within Trøndelag Location within Norway
- Coordinates: 62.9521°N 11.2575°E
- Country: Norway
- Region: Central Norway
- County: Trøndelag
- District: Gauldalen
- Municipality: Holtålen Municipality
- Elevation: 470 m (1,540 ft)
- Time zone: UTC+01:00 (CET)
  - Summer (DST): UTC+02:00 (CEST)
- Post Code: 7383 Haltdalen

Aunegrenda is a village in Holtålen Municipality in Trøndelag county, Norway. The village is located along the river Holda, about 7 kilometres (4.3 mi) northeast of the village of Haltdalen. The village is in the Holdadalen valley, a small side-valley off of the main Gauldalen valley which runs through the whole region.

Aunegrenda Chapel is located in the village. Most of its 50 residents work in agriculture or commute elsewhere.
