= Renbygda =

Village in Holtålen Municipality, Norway

Renbygda Ålen
- Village
- Interactive map of Renbygda; Ålen
- Location within Trøndelag Location within Norway
- Coordinates: 62.8436°N 11.3200°E
- Country: Norway
- Region: Central Norway
- County: Trøndelag
- District: Gauldalen
- Municipality: Holtålen Municipality

Area
  - Total: 0.84 km^{2} (0.32 sq mi)
- Elevation: 471 m (1,545 ft)

Population (2024)
  - Total: 625
  - Density: 744/km^{2} (1,930/sq mi)
- Time zone: UTC+01:00 (CET)
  - Summer (DST): UTC+02:00 (CEST)
- Post Code: 7380 Ålen

Renbygda or Ålen is the administrative centre of Holtålen Municipality in Trøndelag county, Norway. The village is located along the Gaula River and the Rørosbanen railway line, about 30 kilometres (19 mi) north of the town of Røros and about 100 kilometres (62 mi) southeast of the city of Trondheim. The lake Riasten lies about 25 kilometres (16 mi) to the east. The western part of the village area, near the Ålen Church, is also known simply as Ålen.

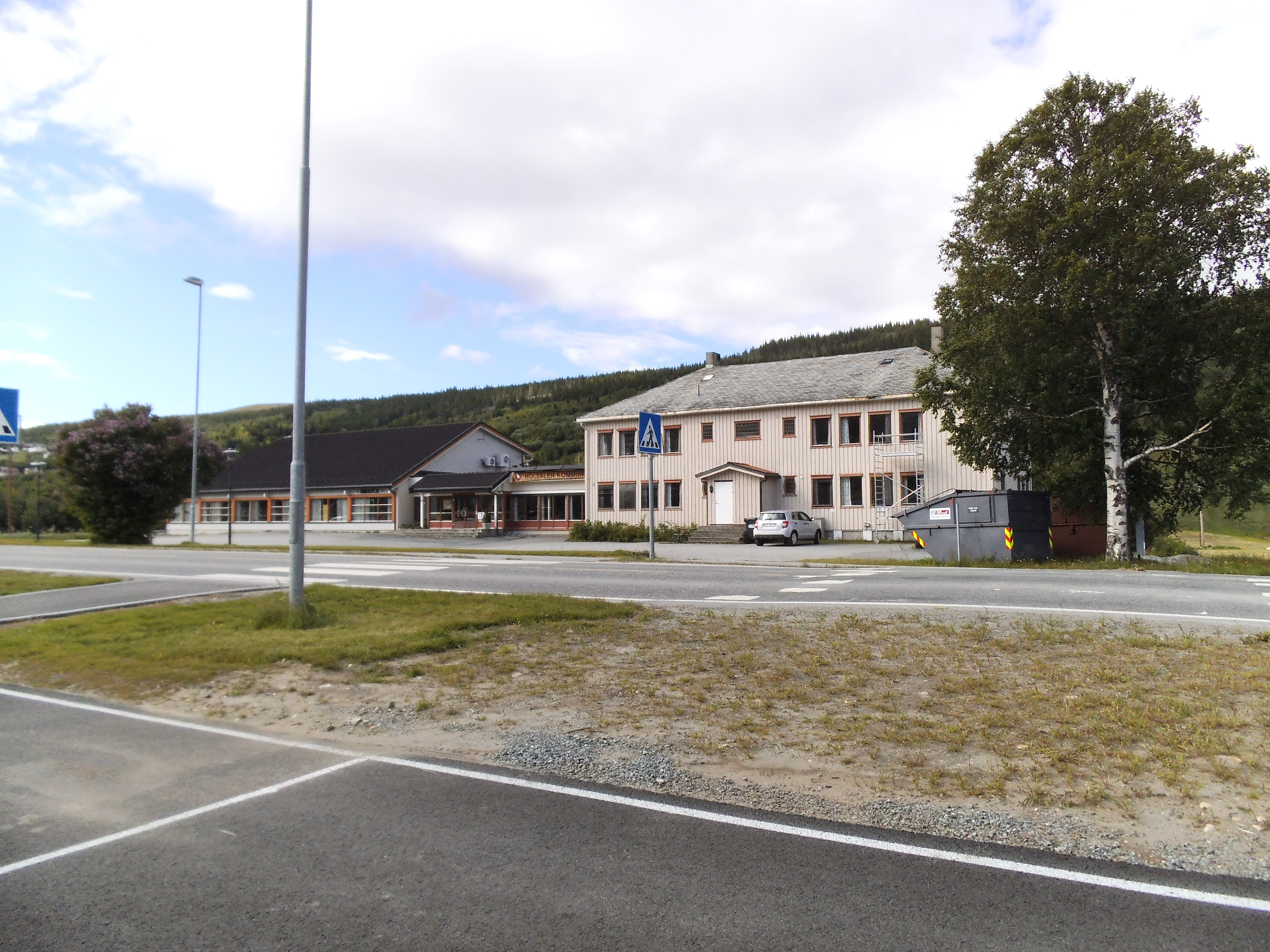
The municipal hall for Holtålen

The 0.84-square-kilometre (210-acre) village has a population (2024) of 625 and a population density of 744 inhabitants per square kilometre (1,930/sq mi).

== Flood ==
On 15 August 2011, the village area experienced a big flood. This was the largest flood since 1940. The village centre as well as the nearby village of Aunegrenda were both affected. The flood arrived during the night and consequently some people woke up trapped in their homes. A rescue helicopter was used to aid people to safety. No one was able to anticipate the flood, which was a result of constant, nightly downpour. It was estimated that between 50 and 80 millimetres (2.0 and 3.1 in) of rain fell that night. There was a lot of damage on homes, cars, roads, and public buildings, plus the majority of stores in the village centre were exposed with massive amounts of water often reaching about 1 metre (3 ft 3 in) or higher on the walls. The river flowed over all the bridges, and made it impossible to cross with any vehicle. Additionally, the only suspension bridge in the area was twisted, deemed impassable, and later rebuilt. Moreover, Holtålen Municipality had invested a large sum of money in a new football field (which was only two days from opening) which was ruined by the river. In the wake of the flood, the area received money from the Norwegian government in aid to help rebuild the village area.
