= Sverresborg =

Ruin. of medieval fortification in Norway

Coordinates: 63°25′11″N 10°21′26″E

- Trondheim, Norway
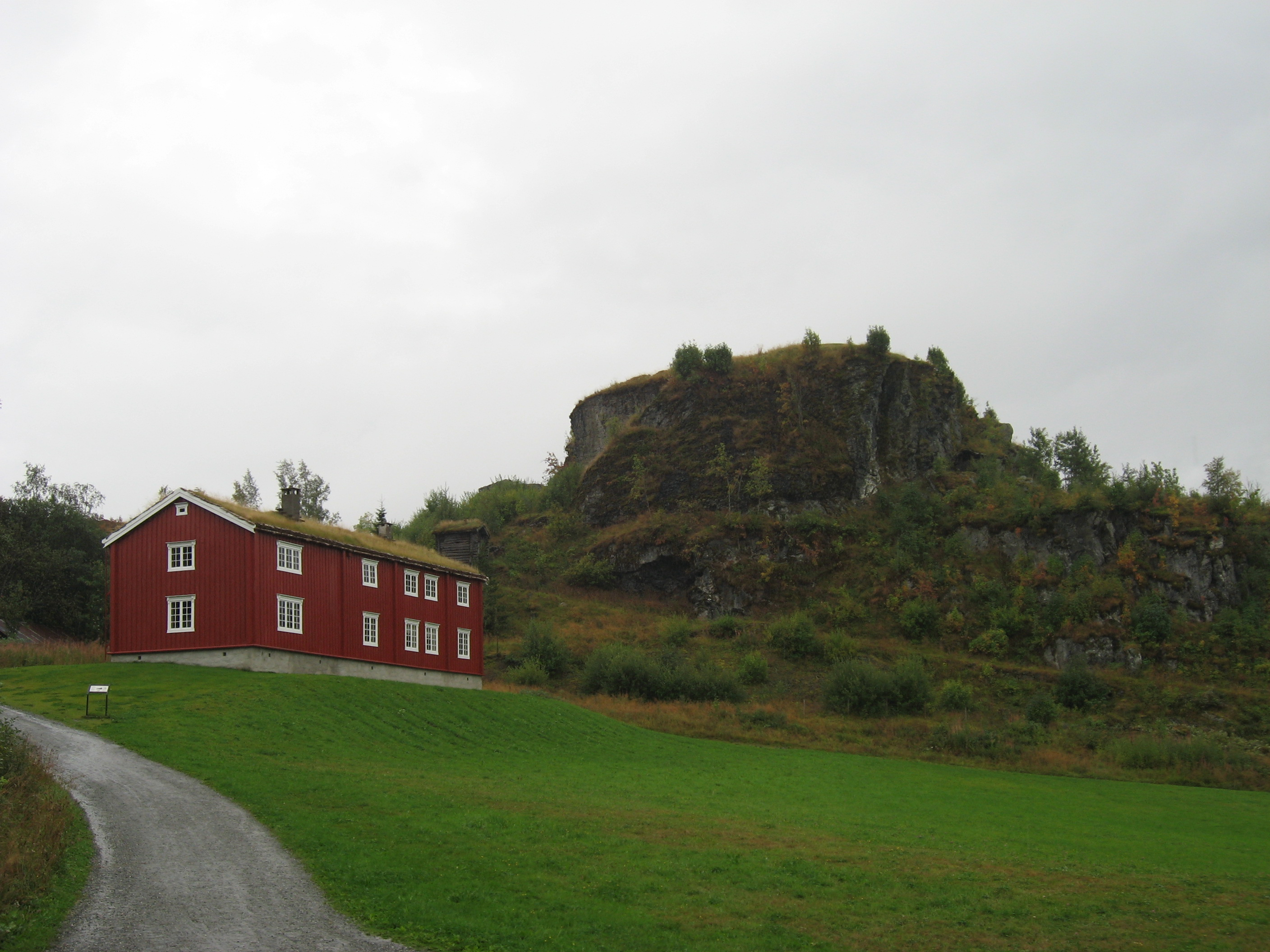
- View of the former castle hill today

Site information
- Type: Castle
- Controlled by: Norway; Birkebein Party; Kings of Norway

Site history
- Built: 1182-1183
- In use: 1183-1263
- Materials: Stone

Sverresborg (Norwegian:Sverresborg i Trondheim) or Sverre Sigurdsson's castle (Kong Sverres borg) was a fort and residence built in the medieval city of Nidaros (later Trondheim) by King Sverre Sigurdsson. The fortification was built in support of Sverre Sigurdsson's struggle against his rival King Magnus Erlingsson to claim the throne of Norway. The site now forms part of the Sverresborg Trøndelag Folk Museum, an open-air museum for the region of Trøndelag.

== Location ==
Defense of the city of Trondheim and the location of Sverresborg was based on three key topographical features:

1. The city is located on a peninsula bordered on the east and south by the river Nidelva and on the north by the Trondheimsfjord
2. The neck connecting the peninsula to the mainland was quite narrow and could be easily fortified
3. A glacially-carved-rock hill just to the south dominates the city and provides an easily fortified site (location of Sverresborg)

== Heklungs War ==
In 1177, Sverre Sigurdsson, who would later rule as king of Norway from 1184-1202, led the rebel Birkebeiner (Birkebeinerne) forces to Trøndelag where Sverre was hailed as king at Øretinget, the Thing (assembly) for Trøndelag. This was an important symbolic event as new Norwegian kings traditionally had been elected there. After this, the Birkebeins moved south and wintered in Østerdalen. The next spring, the Birkebeins returned to Trøndelag, attacking the city of Nidaros (now Trondheim). Defeated, they fled south until they met and beat the army of reigning King Magnus Erlingsson in Ringerike. Encouraged, the Birkebeins again moved north to Trøndelag and remained in Nidaros during the winter of 1178.

During the spring of 1179, Magnus arrived with his army. The two armies met on June 19 in the Battle of Kalvskinnet (Slaget på Kalvskinnet) with the result being a clear victory for Sverre, securing his grip on Trøndelag.

Magnus Erlingsson again attacked Trøndelag in the spring of 1180. Sverre held Trøndelag from Nidaros, which was then protected by a wooden palisades extending from the river to the fjord across the neck of the peninsula connecting the town to the mainland. In the Battle of Ilevollene (Slaget på Ilevollene), just outside Nidaros, the Heklungs were again defeated.

The two forces met again in 1181 in the Battle of Nordnes (Slaget i Bergen 1181) which resulted in a minor victory for Sverre. But Magnus exploited Sverre’s absence from Trøndelag when in November he raided and burned the Birkebeiner fleet located there. Sverre was forced to return or risk losing his one secure foothold. During the summer of 1182, Magnus made an attempt to take Nidaros by siege, but was repulsed with grave losses when the Birkebeins launched a surprise night attack.

== Castle construction ==
In the winter of 1182/1183 Sverre initiated construction of Sverresborg (one of the earliest Norwegian fortresses) to provide him a more secure and more easily defended base from which reside and operate from. The location selected was easily fortified, hard to approach, and could be defended by a small force. The stone for the fortification was available only 0.6km away in the quarry which had been used for construction the cathedral at Nidaros. Since the Archbishop of Nidaros, who had aligned with King Magnus, was in exile in England from 1180 to 1183, the stonemasons were also available. Work proceeded quickly, and Sverre, along with a detachment of his men, moved out to the castle during Lent in 1183.

The sea Battle of Fimreite in 1184 proved to be the final struggle between the Birkebeins and the Heklunger; King Magnus drowned. King Sverre, after a six years of struggle, became the uncontested king of Norway. But the peace was not to last for long.

== Bagler war ==
In 1188 the town of Nidaros, which had been vacated by King Sverre’s men, was attacked. His opposition stormed into the city and a bloodbath followed. The wooden fortress was torn down and the castle burnt and left in ruins. It is not known precisely when it was restored, but the Sverris saga indicates the castle had been restored by 1197 when it records a battle at the castle. During this conflict, a dead man was thrown into the only well which supplied Sverresborg castle with drinking water. This is thought to have been done by the Baglers to poison the drinking water of the Birkebeiners and make the castle uninhabitable.

King Sverre died in Bergen on 8 March 1202. Sverresborg is last mentioned in the time of King Sverre’s paternal grandson, King Haakon Haakonson in 1263, when he allowed the walls of Sverresborg to be broken down.

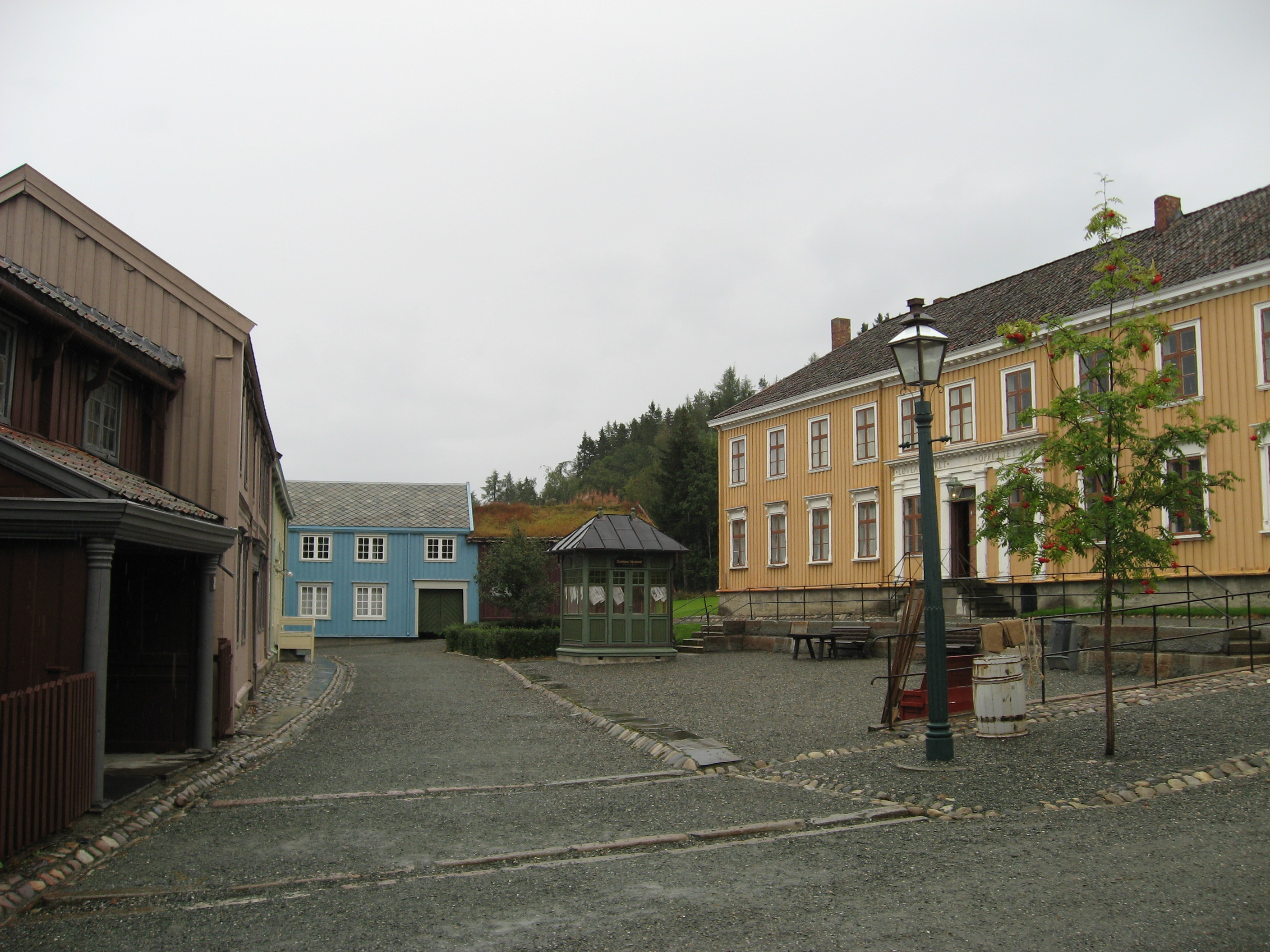
The main 'town square' in Sverresborg Trøndelag Folk Museum today

== Sverresborg Trøndelag Folk Museum ==
Sverresborg Trøndelag Folk Museum is one of the largest cultural history museums in Norway. There are more than 60 buildings on the site now, covering a broad ethnological range.

In 1938, excavations were undertaken on the site and a skeleton was discovered in the filled in well, thought to date from 1197 battle recorded in the Sverris Saga. It took until 2016 for most of the skeleton to be retrieved. In 2024 the skeleton was identified as a man who had been injured and died shortly before being placed in the well. He was in his late 30s or 40s, around 180cm tall and of sturdy build. He suffered from a lung condition and spinal issues, possibly tuberculosis. DNA sequencing from a tooth placed his origin as from Agder in southern Norway, and identified him as blonde with blue eyes.

== See also ==
- Civil war era in Norway

== Other sources ==
- Gjerset, Knut (1915) History of the Norwegian People (The MacMillan Company)
- Kavli, Guthorm (1987) Norges festninger (Universitetsforlaget) ISBN 82-00-18430-7
- Koht, Halvdan (1995) Sverresoga (Oslo: Det Norske Samlaget) ISBN 82-521-4474-8
- Krag, Claus (2005) Sverre – Norges største middelalderkonge (Oslo: H. Aschehoug & Co) ISBN 82-03-23201-9
