= List of municipality numbers of Norway =

This is a list of municipality numbers used in Norway.

The numbers originate from 1946, when four-digit codes were assigned to each municipality. This also applied to municipalities which had ceased to exist at the time. Urban municipalities got municipality numbers in which the third digit was a zero. They were later applied in the ISO 3166-2:NO standard.

== 01 Østfold ==
Number	Municipality	Period assigned
0101	Halden	1837–present
0102	Sarpsborg	1839–1991
0103	Fredrikstad	1837–1993
0104	Moss	1837–present
0105	Sarpsborg	1992–present
0106	Fredrikstad	1994–present
0111	Hvaler	1837–present
0112	Torsnes	1910–1963
0113	Borge	1837–1993
0114	Varteig	1861–1991
0115	Skjeberg	1837–1991
0116	Berg	1837–1966
0117	Idd	1837–1966
0118	Aremark	1837–present
0119	Øymark; Marker	1903–1963; 1964–present
0120	Rødenes	1837–1963
0121	Rømskog	1902–present
0122	Trøgstad	1837–present
0123	Spydeberg	1837–present
0124	Askim	1837–present
0125	Eidsberg	1837–present
0126	Mysen	1920–1960
0127	Skiptvet	1837–present
0128	Rakkestad	1837–present
0129	Degernes	1917–1963
0130	Tune	1837–1991
0131	Rolvsøy	1911–1993
0132	Glemmen	1837–1963
0133	Kråkerøy	1908–1963
0134	Onsøy	1837–1993
0135	Råde	1837–present
0136	Rygge	1837–present
0137	Våler	1837–present
0138	Hobøl	1837–present
0194	Jeløy	1837–1943

== 02 Akershus ==
Number	Municipality	Period assigned
0201	Son/Hølen; Son	1837–1847; 1847–1963
0202	Hvitsten	
0203	Drøbak	1837–1961
0204	Hølen	1847–1942
0211	Vestby	1837–present
0212	Kråkstad	1837–1963
0213	Ski	1931–present
0214	Ås	1837–present
0215	Frogn	1837–present
0216	Nesodden	1837–present
0217	Oppegård	1915–present
0218	Aker	1837–1947
0219	Bærum	1837–present
0220	Asker	1837–present
0221	Høland; Søndre Høland; Aurskog-Høland	1837–1924; 1924–1965; 1966-present
0222	Nordre Høland	1924–1965
0223	Setskog	1905–1965
0224	Aurskog	1837–1965
0225	Blaker	1919–1961
0226	Sørum	1837–present
0227	Fet	1837–present
0228	Rælingen	1929–present
0229	Enebakk	1837–present
0230	Lørenskog	1908–present
0231	Skedsmo	1837–present
0232	Lillestrøm	1908–1961
0233	Nittedal	1837–present
0234	Gjerdrum	1837–present
0235	Ullensaker	1837–present
0236	Nes	1837–present
0237	Eidsvoll	1837–present
0238	Nannestad	1837–present
0239	Hurdal	1837–present
0240	Feiring	1870–1963

== 03 Oslo ==
Number	Municipality	Period assigned
0301	Oslo	1837–present

== 04 Hedmark ==
Number	Municipality	Period assigned
0401	Hamar	1841-1992
0402	Kongsvinger	1855-1963; 1965–present
0403	Hamar	1992–present
0411	Nes	1837-1963
0412	Ringsaker	1837–present
0413	Furnes	1891-1963
0414	Vang	1837-1991
0415	Løten	1837–present
0416	Romedal	1837-1963
0417	Stange	1837–present
0418	Nord-Odal	1837–present
0419	Sør-Odal	1837–present
0420	Eidskog	1864–present
0421	Vinger; Kongsvinger	1837-1963; 1964
0422	Brandval	1867-1963
0423	Grue	1837–present
0424	Hof	1837-1962
0425	Åsnes og Våler; Åsnes	1849-1854; 1854–present
0426	Våler	1854–present
0427	Elverum	1837–present
0428	Trysil	1837–present
0429	Åmot	1837–present
0430	Stor-Elvdal	1837–present
0431	Sollia	1890-1964
0432	Rendal; Ytre Rendal; Rendalen	1837-1880; 1880-1964; 1965-present
0433	Øvre Rendal	1880-1964
0434	Engerdal	1911–present
0435	Os; Tolga-Os	1926-1965; 1966-1975
0436	Tolga	1837-1965; 1976–present
0437	Tynset	1837–present
0438	Alvdal	1864–present
0439	Folldal	1914–present
0440	Kvikne	1837-1965
0441	Os	1976–present

== 05 Oppland ==
Number	Municipality	Period assigned
0501	Lillehammer	1837–present
0502	Gjøvik	1861–present
0511	Dovre	1863–present
0512	Lesja	1837–present
0513	Skjåk	1866–present
0514	Lom	1837–present
0515	Vågå	1837–present
0516	Heidal; Nord-Fron	1908-1963; 1977–present
0517	Sel	1908–present
0518	Fron; Nord-Fron; Fron	1837-1851; 1851-1965; 1966-1977
0519	Sør-Fron	1851-1965; 1977–present
0520	Ringebu	1837–present
0521	Øyer	1837–present
0522	Gausdal; Østre Gausdal; Gausdal	1837-1879; 1879-1961; 1962-present
0523	Vestre Gausdal	1879-1961
0524	Fåberg	1837-1963
0525	Biri	1837-1963
0526	Snertingdal	1910-1963
0527	Vardal	1837-1963
0528	Østre Toten	1837–present
0529	Vestre Toten	1837–present
0530	Eina	1908-1963
0531	Kolbu	1908-1963
0532	Jevnaker	1837–present
0533	Lunner	1898–present
0534	Gran	1837–present
0535	Brandbu	1897-1961
0536	Land; Søndre Land	1837-1847; 1847–present
0537	Fluberg	1914-1961
0538	Nordre Land	1847–present
0539	Torpa	1914-1961
0540	Sør-Aurdal	1837–present
0541	Etnedal	1894–present
0542	Nord-Aurdal	1837–present
0543	Slidre; Vestre Slidre	1837-1849; 1849–present
0544	Øystre Slidre	1849–present
0545	Vang	1837–present
0580	Sollia	1864-1889

== 06 Buskerud ==
Number	Municipality	Period assigned
0601	Hønefoss; Ringerike	1852-1963; 1964-1976
0602	Drammen	1837–present
0603	Holmsbu	
0604	Kongsberg	1837–present
0605	Ringerike	1977–present
0611	Tyristrand	1916-1963
0612	Hole	1837-1963; 1977–present
0613	Norderhov	1837-1963
0614	Ådal	1857-1963
0615	Flå	1905–present
0616	Nes	1837–present
0617	Gol og Hemsedal; Gol	1837-1896; 1897–present
0618	Hemsedal	1897–present
0619	Ål	1837–present
0620	Hol	1877–present
0621	Sigdal	1837–present
0622	Krødsherad	1901–present
0623	Modum	1837–present
0624	Eiker; Øvre Eiker	1852-1885; 1885–present
0625	Nedre Eiker	1885–present
0626	Lier	1837–present
0627	Røyken	1837–present
0628	Hurum	1837–present
0629	Sandsvær; Ytre Sandsvær	1837-1907; 1908-1963
0630	Øvre Sandsvær	1908-1963
0631	Flesberg	1837–present
0632	Rollag	1837–present
0633	Nore; Nore og Uvdal	1858-1961; 1962–present
0634	Uvdal	1901-1961
0680	Strømm	1837
0681	Strømsgodset	1837-1843

== 07 Vestfold ==
Number	Municipality	Period assigned
0701	Svelvik; Borre; Horten	1845-1963; 1988-2002; 2002-present
0702	Holmestrand	1837–present
0703	Horten	1858-1987
0704	Åsgårdstrand; Tønsberg	1837-1964; 1988–present
0705	Tønsberg	1837-1987
0706	Sandefjord	1837–present
0707	Larvik	1837-1987
0708	Stavern	1943-1987
0709	Larvik	1988–present
0711	Svelvik; Strømm; Svelvik	1837-1845; 1845-1963; 1964-present
0712	Skoger	1837-1963
0713	Sande	1837–present
0714	Hof	1837–present
0715	Botne	1837-1963
0716	Våle; Re	1837-2001; 2002–present
0717	Borre	1837-1987
0718	Ramnes	1837-2001
0719	Andebu	1837–present
0720	Stokke	1837–present
0721	Sem	1837-1987
0722	Nøtterøy	1837–present
0723	Tjøme	1837–present
0724	Sandar	1837-1967
0725	Tjølling	1837-1987
0726	Brunlanes	1837-1987
0727	Hedrum	1837-1987
0728	Lardal	1837–present
0798	Stavern	1837-1943

== 08 Telemark ==
Number	Municipality	Period assigned
0801	Kragerø	1837-1959
0802	Langesund	1837-1963
0803	Stathelle	1851-1963
0804	Brevik	1837-1963
0805	Porsgrunn	1837–present
0806	Skien	1837–present
0807	Notodden	1913–present
0811	Siljan	1837–present
0812	Gjerpen	1837-1963
0813	Eidanger	1837-1963
0814	Bamble	1837–present
0815	Skåtøy; Kragerø	1882-1959; 1960–present
0816	Sannidal	1837-1959
0817	Drangedal	1837–present
0818	Solum	1837-1963
0819	Holla; Nome	1837-1963; 1964–present
0820	Lunde	1867-1963
0821	Bø	1837–present
0822	Sauherad	1837–present
0823	Heddal	1837-1963
0824	Gransherad	1860-1963
0825	Hovin	1886-1963
0826	Tinn	1837–present
0827	Hjartdal	1837–present
0828	Seljord	1837–present
0829	Kviteseid	1837–present
0830	Nissedal	1837–present
0831	Fyresdal	1837–present
0832	Mo	1837-1963
0833	Lårdal; Tokke	1837-1963; 1964–present
0834	Vinje	1837–present
0835	Rauland	1860-1963

== 09 Aust-Agder ==
Number	Municipality	Period assigned
0901	Risør	1837–present
0902	Tvedestrand	1837-1959
0903	Arendal	1837-1991
0904	Grimstad	1837–present
0905	Lillesand	1837-1961
0906	Arendal	1992–present
0911	Gjerstad	1837–present
0912	Vegårshei	1837–present
0913	Søndeled	1837-1963
0914	Holt; Tvedestrand	1837-1959; 1960–present
0915	Dypvåg	1837-1959
0916	Flosta	1902-1961
0917	Stokken	1919-1961
0918	Austre Moland; Moland	1837-1961; 1962-1991
0919	Froland	1850–present
0920	Øyestad	1837-1991
0921	Tromøy	1878-1991
0922	Hisøy	1881-1991
0923	Fjære	1846-1970
0924	Landvik	1837-1970
0925	Eide	1837-1961
0926	Vestre Moland; Lillesand	1837-1961; 1962–present
0927	Høvåg	1865-1961
0928	Birkenes	1837–present
0929	Åmli	1837–present
0930	Gjøvdal	1908-1959
0931	Tovdal	1908-1966
0932	Mykland	1876-1966
0933	Herefoss	1837-1966
0934	Evje og Vegusdal; Vegusdal	1837-1876; 1877-1966
0935	Hornnes og Iveland; Iveland	1837-1885; 1886–present
0936	Hornnes	1886-1959
0937	Evje; Evje og Hornnes	1877-1959; 1960–present
0938	Bygland	1837–present
0939	Hylestad	1915-1961
0940	Valle	1837–present
0941	Bykle	1902–present
0980	Åseral	1837-1879
0990	Barbu	1878-1901

== 10 Vest-Agder ==
Number	Municipality	Period assigned
1001	Kristiansand	1837–present
1002	Mandal	1837–present
1003	Farsund	1837–present
1004	Flekkefjord	1837–present
1011	Randesund	1893-1964
1012	Oddernes	1837-1964
1013	Tveit	1837-1964
1014	Vennesla	1865–present
1015	Hægeland	1896-1963
1016	Øvrebø; Øvrebø og Hægeland; Øvrebø	1837-1865; 1865-1896; 1896-1963
1017	Greipstad; Songdalen	1913-1963; 1964–present
1018	Søgne	1837–present
1019	Halse og Harkmark	1864-1963
1020	Holum	1837-1963
1021	Øyslebø; Øyslebø; Marnardal	1837-1898; 1899-1963; 1964–present
1022	Laudal	1899-1963
1023	Finsland	1837-1963
1024	Bjelland og Grindum; Bjelland	1837-1901; 1902-1963
1025	Grindheim	1902-1963
1026	Åseral	1880–present
1027	Undal; Nord-Undal; Konsmo; Audnedal	1837-1845; 1845-1910; 1911-1963; 1964–present
1028	Vigmostad	1911-1963
1029	Sør-Audnedal; Lindesnes	1845-1963; 1964–present
1030	Spangereid	1899-1962
1031	Austad	1909-1962
1032	Lyngdal	1837–present
1033	Kvås	1909-1962
1034	Hægebostad	1837–present
1035	Eiken	1916-1962
1036	Fjotland	1837-1841; 1858-1962
1037	Kvinesdal	1837–present
1038	Feda	1900-1962
1039	Herad	1837-1964
1040	Spind	1893-1964
1041	Lista	1837-1964
1042	Nes og Hitterø; Hidra	1837-1893; 1893-1964
1043	Nes	1893-1964
1044	Gyland	1893-1964
1045	Bakke	1837-1964
1046	Sirdal; Tonstad; Sirdal	1849-1904; 1905-1959; 1960–present
1047	Øvre Sirdal	1905-1959

== 11 Rogaland ==
Number	Municipality	Period assigned
1101	Egersund; Eigersund	1837-1964; 1965–present
1102	Sandnes	1861–present
1103	Stavanger	1837–present
1104	Skudeneshavn	1858-1964
1105	Kopervik	1866-1964
1106	Haugesund	1855–present
1107	Sogndal	1855-1944
1111	Sokndal	1837–present
1112	Lund	1837–present
1113	Heskestad	1837-1964
1114	Bjerkreim	1837–present
1115	Helleland	1837-1964
1116	Eigersund	1837-1964
1117	Ogna	1839-1963
1118	Varhaug	1894-1963
1119	Hå; Nærbø; Hå	1837-1894; 1894-1963; 1964–present
1120	Klepp	1837–present
1121	Time	1837–present
1122	Gjesdal	1837–present
1123	Høyland	1837-1964
1124	Håland; Sola	1837-1930; 1930–present
1125	Madla	1930-1964
1126	Hetland	1837-1964
1127	Randaberg	1922–present
1128	Høgsfjord; Høle	1865-1870; 1871-1964
1129	Forsand	1871–present
1130	Strand	1837–present
1131	Årdal	1859-1964
1132	Fister	1884-1964
1133	Hjelmeland	1837–present
1134	Suldal	1837–present
1135	Sauda	1842–present
1136	Sand	1859-1964
1137	Erfjord	1914-1964
1138	Jelsa	1837-1964
1139	Nærstrand; Hinderaa; Nedstrand	1837-1867; 1868-1881; 1881-1964
1140	Sjernarøy	1868-1964
1141	Finnøy	1837–present
1142	Rennesøy	1837–present
1143	Mosterøy	1884-1964
1144	Kvitsøy	1923–present
1145	Bokn	1849–present
1146	Tysvær	1849–present
1147	Avaldsnes	1837-1964
1148	Stangaland	1909-1964
1149	Åkra; Karmøy	1892-1964; 1965–present
1150	Skudenes	1837-1964
1151	Utsira	1924–present
1152	Torvastad	1837-1964
1153	Skåre	1881-1957
1154	Skjold; Vindafjord	1837-1964; 1965-2005
1155	Vats	1891-1964
1156	Imsland	1923-1964
1157	Vikedal	1837-1964
1158	Sandeid	1923-1964
1160	Vindafjord	2006-present

== 12 Hordaland ==
Number	Municipality	Period assigned
1201	Bergen	1972–present
1211	Etne	1837–present
1212	Skånevik	1837-1964
1213	Fjelberg	1837-1964
1214	Ølen	1916-2001
1215	Vikebygd	1902-1963
1216	Sveio	1837–present
1217	Valestrand	1868-1963
1218	Finnås; Moster	1837-1916; 1916-1962
1219	Bømlo	1916–present
1220	Bremnes	1916-1962
1221	Stord	1837–present
1222	Fitjar	1863–present
1223	Tysnes	1837–present
1224	Kvinnherad	1837–present
1225	Varaldsøy	1902-1964
1226	Strandebarm	1837-1964
1227	Jondal	1862–present
1228	Odda	1862–present
1229	Røldal	1837-1963
1230	Ullensvang (Kinsarvik 1837-1870)	1837–present
1231	Kinsarvik	1913-1963
1232	Eidfjord	1891-1963; 1965–present
1233	Ulvik (Granvin 1837-1859)	1837–present
1234	Granvin	1891–present
1235	Voss	1837–present
1236	Vossestrand	1868-1963
1237	Evanger	1885-1963
1238	Kvam	1837–present
1239	Hålandsdal	1903-1963
1240	Strandvik	1903-1963
1241	Fusa	1856–present
1242	Samnanger	1907–present
1243	Os	1837–present
1244	Austevoll	1886–present
1245	Sund	1837–present
1246	Fjell	1837–present
1247	Askøy	1837–present
1248	Laksevåg	1918-1971
1249	Fana	1837-1971
1250	Arna (Haus 1837-1963)	1837-1971
1251	Bruvik; Vaksdal	1870-1963; 1964–present
1252	Modalen	1837–present
1253	Hosanger; Osterøy	1838-1963; 1964–present
1254	Hamre	1838-1963
1255	Åsane	1904-1971
1256	Meland	1923–present
1257	Alversund	1885-1963
1258	Herdla	1871-1963
1259	Hjelme; Øygarden	1910-1963; 1964–present
1260	Hordabø (Bø 1924-1925); Radøy	1924-1963; 1964–present
1261	Manger	1837-1963
1262	Sæbø	1924-1963
1263	Lindås	1837–present
1264	Austrheim	1910–present
1265	Fedje	1947–present
1266	Masfjorden	1879–present
1280	Årstad	1837-1914
1281	Bergen landdistrikt	1837-1876
1282	Eid	1837-1855

== 13 Bergen ==
Number	Municipality	Period assigned
1301	Bergen	1837-1971

== 14 Sogn og Fjordane ==
Number	Municipality	Period assigned
1401	Florø; Flora	1861-1963; 1964–present
1411	Gulen (Evenvik 1837-1890)	1837–present
1412	Solund (Utvær 1858–1890, Sulen 1890-1923)	1858–present
1413	Hyllestad	1862–present
1414	Brekke	1850-1861; 1905-1963
1415	Lavik; Lavik og Brekke; Lavik	1850-1860; 1861-1904; 1905-1963
1416	Kyrkjebø (Klævold 1858-1890); Høyanger	1858-1963; 1964–present
1417	Vik	1837–present
1418	Balestrand	1850–present
1419	Leikanger	1837–present
1420	Sogndal	1837–present
1421	Aurland	1837–present
1422	Lærdal	1837–present
1423	Borgund	1864-1963
1424	Årdal	1863–present
1425	Hafslo	1837-1962
1426	Luster	1837–present
1427	Jostedal	1837-1962
1428	Askvoll	1837–present
1429	Fjaler	1837–present
1430	Gaular	1837–present
1431	Jølster	1837–present
1432	Førde	1837–present
1433	Naustdal	1896–present
1434	Vevring	1837-1963
1435	Eikefjord	1923-1963
1436	Bru	1923-1963
1437	Kinn	1837-1963
1438	Bremanger	1866–present
1439	Sør-Vågsøy; Vågsøy	1910-1963; 1964–present
1440	Nord-Vågsøy	1910-1963
1441	Selje	1837–present
1442	Davik	1837-1964
1443	Eid	1837–present
1444	Hornindal	1867-1963; 1977–present
1445	Gloppen	1837–present
1446	Breim	1886-1963
1447	Innvik	1837-1964
1448	Stryn	1843-1976
1449	Stryn	1977-present

== 15 Møre og Romsdal ==
Number	Municipality	Period assigned
1501	Ålesund	1837-1976
1502	Molde	1977–present
1503	Kristiansund	1977–present
1504	Ålesund	1977–present
1511	Vanylven	1977–present
1512	Syvde	1918-1963
1513	Rovde	1905-1963
1514	Sande	1867–present
1515	Herøy	1837–present
1516	Ulstein	1837–present
1517	Hareid	1917–present
1518	Dalsfjord	1924-1963
1519	Volda	1837–present
1520	Ørsta	1883–present
1521	Vartdal	1895-1963
1522	Hjørundfjord	1837-1963
1523	Sunnylven; Ørskog	1837-1964; 1977–present
1524	Norddal	1837–present
1525	Stranda	1837–present
1526	Stordal	1892-1964; 1977–present
1527	Ørskog	1837-1976
1528	Sykkylven	1883–present
1529	Skodje	1849-1964; 1977–present
1530	Vatne	1902-1964
1531	Borgund; Sula	1837-1967; 1977–present
1532	Giske	1908–present
1533	Vigra	1890-1963
1534	Haram	1837–present
1535	Vestnes	1837–present
1536	Tresfjord (Sylte 1837-1922)	1899-1963
1537	Eid og Voll; Voll	1837-1873; 1874-1963
1538	Eid	1874-1963
1539	Grytten; Rauma	1837-1963; 1964–present
1540	Hen	1902-1963
1541	Veøy	1837-1963
1542	Eresfjord og Vistdal	1890-1963
1543	Nesset	1837–present
1544	Bolsøy	1837-1963
1545	Aukra; Sør-Aukra; Midsund	1837-1923; 1924-1964; 1965–present
1546	Sandøy	1867–present
1547	Aukra (Sør-Aukra 1924-1964)	1924–present
1548	Fræna	1837–present
1549	Bud	1837-1963
1550	Hustad	1918-1963
1551	Eide	1897–present
1552	Kornstad	1897-1963
1553	Kvernes	1837-1963
1554	Bremsnes; Averøy	1897-1963; 1964–present
1555	Grip	1837-1963
1556	Frei	1837-2007
1557	Gjemnes	1893–present
1558	Øre	1837-1964
1559	Straumsnes	1866-1963
1560	Tingvoll	1837–present
1561	Øksendal	1854-1959
1562	Ålvundeid	1899-1959
1563	Sunndal	1837–present
1564	Stangvik	1837-1964
1565	Åsskard	1895-1964
1566	Surnadal	1837–present
1567	Rindal	1858–2019
1568	Stemshaug	1914-1964
1569	Aure	1837-2005
1570	Valsøyfjord	1894-1964
1571	Halsa	1837–present
1572	Tustna	1874-2005
1573	Edøy; Smøla	1837-1959; 1960–present
1574	Brattvær	1915-1959
1575	Hopen	1915-1959
1576	Aure	2006-present

== 16 Sør-Trøndelag ==
Number	Municipality	Period assigned
1601	Trondheim	1837–2017
1611	Vinje	1924-1963
1612	Hemne	1837–2017
1613	Snillfjord	1924–2017
1614	Heim	1911-1963
1615	Sandstad	1914-1963
1616	Fillan	1886-1963
1617	Hitra	1837–2017
1618	Kvenvær	1913-1963
1619	Frøya; Sør-Frøya	1877-1905; 1906-1963
1620	Nord-Frøya; Frøya	1906-1963; 1964–2017
1621	Ørland	1837–2017
1622	Agdenes (Værnes 1896-1897)	1896–2017
1623	Lensvik	1905-1963
1624	Rissa	1860–2017
1625	Stadsbygd	1837-1963
1626	Stjørna	1899-1963
1627	Bjugn	1853–2017
1628	Nes	1899-1963
1629	Jøssund	1896-1963
1630	Åfjord	1837–2017
1631	Stoksund	1892-1963
1632	Bjørnør; Roan	1837-1892; 1892–2017
1633	Osen	1892–2017
1634	Oppdal	1837–2017
1635	Rennebu	1839–2017
1636	Meldal	1837–2017
1637	Orkland	1920-1962
1638	Orkdal	1837–2017
1639	Orkanger	1920-1962
1640	Røros bergstad Røros	1837–1963; 1963-2017
1641	Røros landsogn	1926-1963
1642	Brekken	1926-1963
1643	Glåmos	1926-1963
1644	Ålen; Holtålen	1855-1971; 1972–2017
1645	Haltdalen (Holtaalen 1837-1937)	1837-1971
1646	Singsås	1841-1963
1647	Budal	1879-1963
1648	Støren; Midtre Gauldal	1837-1963; 1964–2017
1649	Soknedal	1841-1963
1650	Horg	1841-1963
1651	Hølonda	1865-1963
1652	Flå	1880-1963
1653	Melhus	1837–2017
1654	Leinstrand	1837-1963
1655	Byneset	1837-1963
1656	Buvik	1855-1964
1657	Skaun	1837–2017
1658	Børsa	1837-1964
1659	Geitastrand	1905-1962
1660	Strinda	1837-1963
1661	Tiller	1899-1963
1662	Klæbu	1837–2017
1663	Malvik	1891–2017
1664	Selbu	1837–2017
1665	Tydal	1901-2017

== 17 Nord-Trøndelag ==
Number	Municipality	Period assigned
1701	Levanger	1856-1961
1702	Steinkjer	1858–2017
1703	Namsos	1846–2017
1711	Øvre Stjørdalen; Meråker	1850-1873; 1874–2017
1712	Hegra	1874-1961
1713	Lånke	1902-1961
1714	Stjørdalen; Nedre Stjørdalen; Stjørdal	1837-1850; 1850-1901; 1902–2017
1715	Skatval	1902-1961
1716	Åsen	1837-1961
1717	Frosta	1837–2017
1718	Leksvik	1837–2017
1719	Skogn; Levanger	1837-1961; 1962–2017
1720	Levanger; Frol	1837-1856; 1856-1961
1721	Verdal	1837–2017
1722	Ytterøy	1837-1963
1723	Mosvik og Verran; Mosvik	1867-1900; 1901–2012
1724	Verran	1901–2017
1725	Namdalseid	1904–2017
1726	Malm	1913-1963
1727	Beitstad	1837-1963
1728	Sandvollan	1907-1961
1729	Inderøy	1837–2012
1730	Røra	1907-1961
1731	Sparbu	1837-1963
1732	Ogndal (Skei 1885-1900)	1885-1963
1733	Egge	1869-1963
1734	Stod	1837-1963
1735	Kvam	1909-1963
1736	Snåsa	1837–2017
1737	Lierne; Sørli	1874-1915; 1915-1963
1738	Nordli; Lierne	1915-1963; 1964–2017
1739	Røyrvik	1923–2017
1740	Namsskogan	1923–2017
1741	Harran	1923-1963
1742	Grong	1837–2017
1743	Høylandet	1901–2017
1744	Overhalla	1837–2017
1745	Vemundvik	1837-1963
1746	Klinga	1891-1963
1747	Otterøy	1913-1963
1748	Fosnes	1837–2017
1749	Flatanger	1871–2017
1750	Vikna	1869–2017
1751	Nærøy	1837–2017
1752	Kolvereid	1837-1963
1753	Foldereid	1886-1963
1754	Gravvik	1909-1963
1755	Leka	1860-2017
1756	Inderøy	2012-2017

== 18 Nordland ==
Number	Municipality	Period assigned
1801	Brønnøysund	1923-1963
1802	Mosjøen	1875-1961
1803	Mo	1923-1963
1804	Bodø	1837–present
1805	Narvik	1902–present
1806	Svolvær	1918-1963
1811	Bindal	1837–present
1812	Sømna	1901-1963; 1977–present
1813	Velfjord; Brønnøy	1875-1963; 1964–present
1814	Brønnøy	1837-1963
1815	Vega	1837–present
1816	Vevelstad	1916–present
1817	Tjøtta	1862-1964
1818	Herøy	1864–present
1819	Nordvik	1917-1961
1820	Alstahaug	1837–present
1821	Sandnessjøen (Stamnes 1899-1948)	1899-1964
1822	Leirfjord	1915–present
1823	Drevja	1927-1961
1824	Vefsn	1837–present
1825	Grane	1927–present
1826	Hattfjelldal	1927–present
1827	Dønnes; Dønna	1888-1961; 1962–present
1828	Nesna	1837–present
1829	Elsfjord	1929-1961
1830	Korgen	1837-1963
1831	Sør-Rana	1929-1963
1832	Hemnes	1837–present
1833	Mo; Nord-Rana; Rana	1837-1922; 1923-1963; 1964–present
1834	Lurøy	1837–present
1835	Træna	1872–present
1836	Rødøy	1837–present
1837	Meløy	1884–present
1838	Gildeskål	1837–present
1839	Beiarn	1853–present
1840	Saltdal	1837–present
1841	Fauske	1905–present
1842	Skjerstad	1837-2004
1843	Bodin	1837-1967
1844	Kjerringøy	1906-1963
1845	Folden; Sørfold	1837-1886; 1887–present
1846	Nordfold-Kjerringøy; Nordfold	1887-1905; 1906-1963
1847	Leiranger	1900-1963
1848	Steigen	1837–present
1849	Hamarøy	1837–present
1850	Tysfjord	1869–present
1851	Lødingen	1837–present
1852	Tjeldsund	1909–present
1853	Ofoten; Evenes	1837-1883; 1884–present
1854	Ballangen	1925–present
1855	Ankenes	1884-1973
1856	Røst	1909–present
1857	Værøy	1837–present
1858	Moskenes	1916-1975
1859	Flakstad	1837-1963; 1976–present
1860	Buksnes; Vestvågøy	1837-1962; 1963–present
1861	Hol	1919-1962
1862	Borge	1837-1962
1863	Valberg	1927-1962
1864	Gimsøy	1856-1963
1865	Vågan	1837–present
1866	Hadsel	1837–present
1867	Bø	1837–present
1868	Øksnes	1837–present
1869	Langenes	1919-1962
1870	Sortland	1837–present
1871	Bjørnskinn; Andøy	1924-1963; 1964–present
1872	Dverberg	1837-1963
1873	Andenes	1924-1963
1874	Moskenes	1976-present

== 19 Troms ==
Number	Municipality	Period assigned
1901	Harstad	1904-2012
1902	Tromsø	1837–present
1903	Harstad	2013–present
1911	Kvæfjord	1837–present
1912	Sandtorg	1926-1963
1913	Skånland	1926–present
1914	Trondenes	1837-1963
1915	Bjarkøy (Sand 1837-1886)	1837-2012
1916	Andørja	1926-1963
1917	Ibestad	1837–present
1918	Astafjord	1926-1963
1919	Gratangen	1926–present
1920	Lavangen	1907-1963; 1977–present
1921	Salangen	1871-1976
1922	Bardu	1854–present
1923	Øverbygd; Salangen	1925-1963; 1977–present
1924	Målselv	1848–present
1925	Sørreisa	1886–present
1926	Dyrøy	1886–present
1927	Tranøy	1837–present
1928	Torsken	1902–present
1929	Berg	1837–present
1930	Hillesøy	1855/1871-1963
1931	Lenvik	1837–present
1932	Malangen	1871-1963
1933	Balsfjord	1860–present
1934	Tromsøysund (Tromsøe landdistrikt 1837-1860)	1837-1963
1935	Helgøy	1886-1963
1936	Karlsøy	1837–present
1937	Ullsfjord	1902-1963
1938	Lyngen	1837–present
1939	Storfjord	1929–present
1940	Kåfjord	1929–present
1941	Skjervøy	1837–present
1942	Nordreisa	1886–present
1943	Kvænangen	1863-present

== 20 Finnmark ==
Number	Municipality	Period assigned
2001	Hammerfest	1837-1991
2002	Vardø	1837–present
2003	Vadsø	1837–present
2004	Hammerfest	1992–present
2011	Kautokeino	1851–present
2012	Alten-Talvig; Alta	1837-1863; 1863–present
2013	Talvik	1863-1963
2014	Loppa	1837–present
2015	Hasvik	1853–present
2016	Sørøysund	1852-1991
2017	Kvalsund	1869–present
2018	Måsøy	1839–present
2019	Nordkapp	1861–present
2020	Porsanger (Kistrand 1837-1963)	1837–present
2021	Karasjok	1869–present
2022	Lebesby	1837–present
2023	Gamvik	1914–present
2024	Berlevåg	1914–present
2025	Tana	1864–present
2026	Polmak	1903-1963
2027	Nesseby	1839-1858; 1864–present
2028	Båtsfjord (Vardø landsogn 1839-1954)	1839–present
2029	Nord-Varanger	1894-1963
2030	Sør-Varanger	1858-present

== 50 Trøndelag ==
On 1 January 2018, the counties of Nord-Trøndelag and Sør-Trøndelag were merged into a new county called Trøndelag. This new arrangement meant that all municipalities would get new municipality numbers.

Number	Municipality	Period assigned
5001	Trondheim	2018–present
5004	Steinkjer	2018–present
5005	Namsos	2018–present
5011	Hemne	2018–present
5012	Snillfjord	2018–present
5013	Hitra	2018–present
5014	Frøya	2018–present
5015	Ørland	2018–present
5016	Agdenes	2018–present
5017	Bjugn	2018–present
5018	Åfjord	2018–present
5019	Roan	2018–present
5020	Osen	2018–present
5021	Oppdal	2018–present
5022	Rennebu	2018–present
5023	Meldal	2018–present
5024	Orkdal	2018–present
5025	Røros	2018–present
5026	Holtålen	2018–present
5027	Midtre Gauldal	2018–present
5028	Melhus	2018–present
5029	Skaun	2018–present
5030	Klæbu	2018–present
5031	Malvik	2018–present
5032	Selbu	2018–present
5033	Tydal	2018–present
5034	Meråker	2018–present
5035	Stjørdal	2018–present
5036	Frosta	2018–present
5037	Levanger	2018–present
5038	Verdal	2018–present
5039	Verran	2018–present
5040	Namdalseid	2018–present
5041	Snåsa	2018–present
5042	Lierne	2018–present
5043	Røyrvik	2018–present
5044	Namsskogan	2018–present
5045	Grong	2018–present
5046	Høylandet	2018–present
5047	Overhalla	2018–present
5048	Fosnes	2018–present
5049	Flatanger	2018–present
5050	Vikna	2018–present
5051	Nærøy	2018–present
5052	Leka	2018–present
5053	Inderøy	2018–present
5054	Indre Fosen	2018–present
5061	Rindal	2019–present

== See also ==
- Municipalities of Norway, a list of present municipalities in Norway sorted by number.
