= List of former municipalities of Norway =

This is a list of former municipalities of Norway — municipalities that have ceased to exist at some point in time (some have later been re-established).

When the local council system was introduced in Norway in 1837-38, the country had 392 municipalities. By 1958, the number had grown to a total of 744 rural municipalities, 64 city municipalities as well as a small number of small seaports with ladested status. A committee led by Nikolai Schei, formed in 1946 to examine the situation, proposed hundreds of mergers to reduce the number of municipalities and improve the quality of local administration. Most of the mergers were carried out, albeit to significant popular protest. By 1966, most of the mergers had been carried out and there were only 470 municipalities remaining. This number continued to slowly decrease throughout the remainder of the 20th century.

By January 2002, there were 434 municipalities in Norway, and Erna Solberg, Minister of Local Government and Regional Development at the time, expressed a wish to reduce the current tally by 100. The Ministry spent approximately 140 million kr on a project to look into the possibilities in this field, and referendums were held in several municipalities in conjunction with the municipal elections of 2003. A small number of municipalities agreed to the plan; for instance Frei Municipality merged with Kristiansund Municipality on 1 January 2008. Others rejected the possibility following the referendums, such as Hobøl Municipality merging with Spydeberg Municipality or Hol Municipality merging with Ål Municipality. The project was abandoned by Solberg's successor Åslaug Haga in early 2006. In 2016 and 2017, when Erna Solberg was the Prime Minister of Norway, she and her government pushed for further municipal consolidations which mostly took place in 2020, reducing the number of municipalities to 356. On 1 January 2024 Ålesund was split and the municipality of Haram was re-established, bringing the total number of municipalities in Norway to 357.

Some municipalities ceased to exist only for a limited amount of time, such as Flakstad Municipality and Hole Municipality (which were former municipalities between 1964 and 1976). In cases like these, the mergers of municipalities were reversed and the former municipalities once again became self-governing. On the other hand, a small number of newly created municipalities were abolished in the same way, for instance Tolga-Os Municipality, which came into being as a result of a 1966 merger which was reversed in 1976.

== List by county (pre-2020 division) ==
=== Akershus ===
Former	Fate	Result	Year
Aker	Incorporated into Oslo	Oslo	1948
Aurskog	Merged with Nordre Høland, Setskog and Søndre Høland	Aurskog-Høland	1966
Blaker	Incorporated into Sørum	Sørum	1962
Drøbak	Incorporated into Frogn	Frogn	1962
Feiring	Incorporated into Eidsvoll	Eidsvoll	1964
Fet	Merged with Skedsmo and Sørum	Lillestrøm	2020
Høland	Split in two	Nordre Høland; Søndre Høland	1924
Hølen	Incorporated into Vestby	Vestby	1946
Kråkstad	Incorporated into Ski	Ski	1964
Lillestrøm	Incorporated into Skedsmo	Skedsmo	1962
Nordre Høland	Merged with Aurskog, Setskog and Søndre Høland	Aurskog-Høland	1966
Oppegård	Merged with Ski	Nordre Follo	2020
Setskog	Merged with Aurskog, Nordre Høland and Søndre Høland	Aurskog-Høland	1966
Skedsmo	Merged with Fet and Sørum	Lillestrøm	2020
Ski	Merged with Oppegård	Nordre Follo	2020
Son	Incorporated into Vestby	Vestby	1964
Son/Hølen	Split in two	Son; Hølen	1847
Søndre Høland	Merged with Aurskog, Nordre Høland and Setskog	Aurskog-Høland	1966
Sørum	Merged with Fet and Skedsmo	Lillestrøm	2020

=== Aust-Agder ===
Former	Fate	Result	Year
Austre Moland	Merged with Flosta and Stokken	Moland	1962
Barbu	Incorporated into Arendal	Arendal	1902
Dypvåg	Incorporated into Tvedestrand	Tvedestrand	1960
Eide	Incorporated into Landvik	Landvik	1962
Evje	Merged with Hornnes	Evje og Hornnes	1960
Evje og Vegusdal	Split in two	Evje; Vegusdal	1877
Fjære	Incorporated into Grimstad	Grimstad	1971
Flosta	Merged with Austre Moland and Stokken	Moland	1962
Gjøvdal	Incorporated into Åmli	Åmli	1960
Herefoss	Incorporated into Birkenes	Birkenes	1967
Hisøy	Incorporated into Arendal	Arendal	1992
Holt	Incorporated into Tvedestrand	Tvedestrand	1960
Hornnes	Merged with Evje	Evje og Hornnes	1960
Hornnes og Iveland	Split in two	Hornnes; Iveland	1886
Hylestad	Incorporated into Valle	Valle	1962
Høvåg	Incorporated into Lillesand	Lillesand	1962
Landvik	Incorporated into Grimstad	Grimstad	1971
Moland	Incorporated into Arendal	Arendal	1992
Mykland	Incorporated into Froland	Froland	1967
Stokken	Merged with Austre Moland and Flosta	Moland	1962
Søndeled	Incorporated into Risør	Risør	1964
Tovdal	Incorporated into Åmli	Åmli	1967
Tromøy	Incorporated into Arendal	Arendal	1992
Vegusdal	Incorporated into Birkenes	Birkenes	1967
Vestre Moland	Incorporated into Lillesand	Lillesand	1962
Øyestad	Incorporated into Arendal	Arendal	1992

=== Buskerud ===
Former	Fate	Result	Year
Eiker	Split in two	Nedre Eiker; Øvre Eiker	1885
Gol og Hemsedal	Split in two	Gol; Hemsedal	1897
Hurum	Merged with Asker and Røyken	Asker	2020
Hønefoss	Merged with Hole, Norderhov, Tyristrand and Ådal	Ringerike	1964
Nedre Eiker	Incorporated into Drammen	Drammen	2020
Norderhov	Merged with Hole, Hønefoss, Tyristrand and Ådal	Ringerike	1964
Nore	Merged with Uvdal	Nore og Uvdal	1962
Røyken	Merged with Asker and Hurum	Asker	2020
Sandsvær	Split in two	Ytre Sandsvær; Øvre Sandsvær	1908
Strømm	Incorporated into Svelvik	Svelvik	1964
Strømsgodset	Incorporated into Skoger	Skoger	1843
Tyristrand	Merged with Hole, Hønefoss, Norderhov and Ådal	Ringerike	1964
Uvdal	Merged with Nore	Nore og Uvdal	1962
Ytre Sandsvær	Incorporated into Kongsberg	Kongsberg	1964
Øvre Sandsvær	Incorporated into Kongsberg	Kongsberg	1964
Ådal	Merged with Hole, Hønefoss, Norderhov and Tyristrand	Ringerike	1964

=== Finnmark ===
Former	Fate	Result	Year
Alta-Talvik	Split in two	Alta; Talvik	1863
Kvalsund	Incorporated into Hammerfest	Hammerfest	2020
Nord-Varanger	Incorporated into Vadsø	Vadsø	1964
Polmak	Incorporated into Tana	Tana	1964
Sørøysund	Incorporated into Hammerfest	Hammerfest	1992
Talvik	Incorporated into Alta	Alta	1964

=== Hedmark ===
Former	Fate	Result	Year
Brandval	Merged with Kongsvinger and Vinger	Kongsvinger	1964
Furnes	Merged with Ringsaker and Nes	Ringsaker	1964
Hof	Incorporated into Åsnes	Åsnes	1963
Kvikne	Divided among several municipalities	Rennebu; Tynset	1966
Nes	Merged with Ringsaker and Furnes	Ringsaker	1964
Rendal	Split in two	Ytre Rendal; Øvre Rendal	1880
Romedal	Incorporated into Stange	Stange	1964
Sollia	Incorporated into Stor-Elvdal (and moved from Oppland county to Hedmark county	Stor-Elvdal	1965
Tolga-Os	Split in two	Os; Tolga	1976
Vang	Merged with Hamar	Hamar	1992
Vinger	Merged with Kongsvinger (town) and Brandval	Kongsvinger	1964
Ytre Rendal	Merged with Øvre Rendal	Rendalen	1965
Øvre Rendal	Merged with Ytre Rendal	Rendalen	1965
Åsnes og Våler	Split in two	Våler; Åsnes	1854

=== Hordaland ===
Former	Fate	Result	Year
Alversund	Incorporated into Lindås	Lindås	1964
Arna	Incorporated into Bergen	Bergen	1972
Bergen landdistrikt	Incorporated into Bergen	Bergen	1877
Bremnes	Incorporated into Bømlo	Bømlo	1964
Bruvik	Divided among several municipalities	Vaksdal; Osterøy	1964
Eid	Incorporated into Fjelberg	Fjelberg	1855
Evanger	Divided among several municipalities	Voss; Vaksdal	1964
Fana	Incorporated into Bergen	Bergen	1972
Finnås	Split in three	Bremnes; Bømlo; Moster	1916
Fjelberg	Incorporated into Kvinnherad	Kvinnherad	1965
Fjell	Merged with Øygarden and Sund	Øygarden	2020
Fusa	Merged with Os	Bjørnafjorden	2020
Granvin	Incorporated into Voss	Voss	2020
Hamre	Divided among several municipalities	Osterøy; Meland	1964
Haus	Divided among several municipalities One part was incorporated into Osterøy, the other changed its name to Arna	Osterøy; Arna	1964
Herdla	Divided among several municipalities	Askøy; Øygarden; Meland; Fjell	1964
Hjelme	Merged with Herdla	Øygarden	1964
Hordabø	Merged with Manger, Sæbø and parts of Austrheim, Herdla, and Lindås	Radøy	1964
Hosanger	Divided among several municipalities	Osterøy; Lindås	1964
Hålandsdal	Incorporated into Fusa	Fusa	1964
Jondal	Merged with Odda and Ullensvang	Ullensvang	2020
Kinsarvik	Incorporated into Ullensvang	Ullensvang	1964
Laksevåg	Incorporated into Bergen	Bergen	1972
Lindås	Merged with Meland and Radøy	Alver	2020
Manger	Merged with Hordabø, Sæbø and parts of Austrheim, Herdla and Lindås	Radøy	1964
Meland	Merged with Lindås and Radøy	Alver	2020
Moster	Incorporated into Bømlo	Bømlo	1964
Odda	Merged with Jondal and Ullensvang	Ullensvang	2020
Os	Merged with Fusa	Bjørnafjorden	2020
Radøy	Merged with Lindås and Meland	Alver	2020
Røldal	Incorporated into Odda	Odda	1964
Skånevik	Divided among several municipalities	Etne; Kvinnherad	1965
Strandebarm	Incorporated into Kvam	Kvam	1965
Strandvik	Incorporated into Fusa	Fusa	1964
Sund	Merged with Fjell and Øygarden	Øygarden	2020
Sæbø	Merged with Hordabø, Manger and parts of Austrheim, Herdla, and Lindås	Radøy	1964
Valestrand	Incorporated into Sveio	Sveio	1964
Varaldsøy	Divided among several municipalities	Kvam; Kvinnherad	1965
Vikebygd	Divided among several municipalities	Sveio; Ølen	1964
Vossestrand	Incorporated into Voss	Voss	1964
Ølen	Incorporated into Vindafjord	Vindafjord	2006
Årstad	Incorporated into Bergen	Bergen	1915
Åsane	Incorporated into Bergen	Bergen	1972

=== Møre og Romsdal ===
Former	Fate	Result	Year
Bolsøy	Incorporated into Molde	Molde	1964
Borgund	Incorporated into Ålesund	Ålesund	1968
Brattvær	Merged with Edøy and Hopen	Smøla	1960
Bremsnes	Divided among several municipalities	Averøy; Frei; Kristiansund	1964
Bud	Incorporated into Fræna	Fræna	1964
Dalsfjord	Incorporated into Volda	Volda	1964
Edøy	Merged with Brattvær and Hopen	Smøla	1960
Eid	Merged with Grytten, Hen, Voll and part of Veøy	Rauma	1964
Eid og Voll	Split in two	Eid; Voll	1874
Eide	Merged with Fræna	Hustadvika	2020
Eresfjord og Vistdal	Incorporated into Nesset	Nesset	1964
Frei	Incorporated into Kristiansund	Kristiansund	2008
Fræna	Merged with Eide	Hustadvika	2020
Grip	Incorporated into Kristiansund	Kristiansund	1964
Grytten	Merged with Eid, Hen, Voll and part of Veøy	Rauma	1964
Halsa	Merged with Hemne and part of Snillfjord	Heim	2020
Haram	Merged with Sandøy, Skodje, Ørskog, and Ålesund	Ålesund	2020*
Hen	Merged with Eid, Grytten, Voll and part of Veøy	Rauma	1964
Hjørundfjord	Incorporated into Ørsta	Ørsta	1964
Hopen	Merged with Brattvær and Edøy	Smøla	1960
Hustad	Incorporated into Fræna	Fræna	1964
Kornstad	Divided among several municipalities	Averøy; Eide	1964
Kvernes	Merged with most of Bremsnes and Kornstad	Averøy	1964
Midsund	Merged with Molde and Nesset	Molde	2020
Nesset	Merged with Molde and Midsund	Molde	2020
Norddal	Merged with Stordal	Fjord	2020
Rovde	Divided among several municipalities	Sande; Vanylven	1964
Sandøy	Merged with Haram, Skodje, Ørskog, and Ålesund	Ålesund	2020
Skodje	Merged with Sandøy, Haram, Ørskog, and Ålesund	Ålesund	2020
Stangvik	Divided among several municipalities	Surnadal; Sunndal; Tingvoll	1965
Stemshaug	Incorporated into Aure	Aure	1965
Stordal	Merged with Norddal	Fjord	2020
Straumsnes	Incorporated into Tingvoll	Tingvoll	1964
Sunnylven	Incorporated into Stranda	Stranda	1965
Syvde	Incorporated into Vanylven	Vanylven	1964
Sør-Aukra	Merged with a part of Vatne	Midsund	1965
Tresfjord	Incorporated into Vestnes	Vestnes	1964
Tustna	Incorporated into Aure	Aure	2006
Valsøyfjord	Divided among several municipalities	Halsa; Aure	1965
Vartdal	Incorporated into Ørsta	Ørsta	1964
Vatne	Divided among several municipalities	Haram; Midsund	1965
Veøy	Divided among several municipalities	Molde; Rauma	1964
Vigra	Incorporated into Giske	Giske	1964
Voll	Merged with Eid, Grytten, Hen and part of Veøy	Rauma	1964
Øksendal	Incorporated into Sunndal	Sunndal	1960
Øre	Incorporated into Gjemnes	Gjemnes	1965
Ørskog	Merged with Haram, Sandøy, Skodje, and Ålesund	Ålesund	2020
Ålvundeid	Incorporated into Sunndal	Sunndal	1960
Åsskard	Incorporated into Surnadal	Surnadal	1965

=== Nordland ===
Former	Fate	Result	Year
Andenes	Merged with Bjørnskinn and Dverberg	Andøy	1964
Ankenes	Merged with Narvik	Narvik	1974
Ballangen	Incorporated into Narvik	Narvik	2020
Bjørnskinn	Merged with Andenes and Dverberg	Andøy	1964
Bodin	Merged with Bodø	Bodø	1968
Borge	Merged with Buksnes, Hol and Valberg	Vestvågøy	1963
Brønnøysund	Incorporated into Brønnøy	Brønnøy	1964
Buksnes	Merged with Borge, Hol and Valberg	Vestvågøy	1963
Drevja	Incorporated into Vefsn	Vefsn	1962
Dverberg	Merged with Andenes and Bjørnskinn	Andøy	1964
Dønnes	Merged with Nordvik	Dønna	1962
Elsfjord	Incorporated into Vefsn	Vefsn	1962
Folden	Split in two	Nordfold-Kjerringøy; Sørfold	1887
Gimsøy	Incorporated into Vågan	Vågan	1964
Hol	Merged with Borge, Buksnes, and Valberg	Vestvågøy	1963
Kjerringøy	Incorporated into Bodin	Bodin	1964
Korgen	Incorporated into Hemnes	Hemnes	1964
Langenes	Incorporated into Øksnes	Øksnes	1964
Leiranger	Incorporated into Steigen	Steigen	1964
Mo	Merged with Nord-Rana and parts of Nesna and Sør-Rana	Rana	1964
Mosjøen	Incorporated into Vefsn	Vefsn	1962
Nord-Rana	Merged with Mo and parts of Nesna and Sør-Rana	Rana	1964
Nordfold	Incorporated into Steigen	Steigen	1964
Nordfold-Kjerringøy	Split in two	Kjerringøy; Nordfold	1906
Nordvik	Merged with Dønnes	Dønna	1962
Ofoten	Split in two	Ankenes; Evindnæs	1884
Sandnessjøen	Incorporated into Alstahaug	Alstahaug	1965
Skjerstad	Incorporated into Bodø	Bodø	2005
Svolvær	Incorporated into Vågan	Vågan	1964
Sør-Rana	Divided among several municipalities	Hemnes; Rana	1964
Tjøtta	Incorporated into Alstahaug	Alstahaug	1965
Tysfjord	Divided between two municipalities	Hamarøy; Narvik	2020
Valberg	Merged with Borge, Buksnes, and Hol	Vestvågøy	1963
Velfjord	Incorporated into Brønnøy	Brønnøy	1964

=== Oppland ===
Former	Fate	Result	Year
Biri	Incorporated into Gjøvik	Gjøvik	1964
Brandbu	Incorporated into Gran	Gran	1962
Eina	Incorporated into Vestre Toten	Vestre Toten	1964
Fluberg	Incorporated into Søndre Land	Søndre Land	1962
Fron	Split in two	Nord-Fron; Sør-Fron	1977
Fåberg	Merged with Lillehammer	Lillehammer	1964
Heidal	Incorporated into Sel	Sel	1965
Kolbu	Incorporated into Østre Toten	Østre Toten	1964
Land	Split in two	Nordre Land; Søndre Land	1847
Slidre	Split in two	Vestre Slidre; Øystre Slidre	1849
Snertingdal	Incorporated into Gjøvik	Gjøvik	1964
Sollia	Incorporated into Stor-Elvdal	Stor-Elvdal	1965
Torpa	Incorporated into Nordre Land	Nordre Land	1962
Vardal	Incorporated into Gjøvik	Gjøvik	1964
Vestre Gausdal	Merged with Østre Gausdal	Gausdal	1962
Østre Gausdal	Merged with Vestre Gausdal	Gausdal	1962

=== Rogaland ===
Former	Fate	Result	Year
Avaldsnes	Divided among several municipalities	Karmøy; Tysvær	1965
Egersund	Incorporated into Eigersund	Eigersund	1965
Erfjord	Incorporated into Suldal	Suldal	1965
Finnøy	Incorporated into Stavanger	Stavanger	2020
Fister	Divided among several municipalities	Finnøy; Hjelmeland	1965
Forsand	Divided between two municipalities	Sandnes; Strand	2020
Helleland	Incorporated into Eigersund	Eigersund	1965
Heskestad	Divided among several municipalities	Eigersund; Lund	1965
Hetland	Divided among several municipalities	Sandnes; Stavanger	1965
Hjelmeland og Fister	Split in two	Fister; Hjelmeland	1884
Høle	Incorporated into Sandnes	Sandnes	1965
Høyland	Incorporated into Sandnes	Sandnes	1965
Håland	Split in two	Madla; Sola	1930
Imsland	Merged with Sandeid, Vikedal, Vats, and part of Skjold	Vindafjord	1965
Jelsa	Incorporated into Suldal	Suldal	1965
Kopervik	Merged with Avaldsnes, Skudenes, Skudeneshavn, Stangaland, Torvastad, and Åkra	Karmøy	1965
Madla	Incorporated into Stavanger	Stavanger	1965
Mosterøy	Incorporated into Rennesøy	Rennesøy	1965
Nedstrand	Incorporated into Tysvær	Tysvær	1965
Nærbø	Merged with Ogna and Varhaug	Hå	1964
Ogna	Merged with Nærbø and Varhaug	Hå	1964
Rennesøy	Incorporated into Stavanger	Stavanger	2020
Sand	Incorporated into Suldal	Suldal	1965
Sandeid	Merged with Imsland, Vikedal, Vats, and part of Skjold	Vindafjord	1965
Sjernarøy	Incorporated into Finnøy	Finnøy	1965
Skjold	Divided among several municipalities	Tysvær; Vindafjord	1965
Skudenes	Merged with Avaldsnes, Kopervik, Skudeneshavn, Stangaland, Torvastad and Åkra	Karmøy	1965
Skudeneshavn	Merged with Avaldsnes, Kopervik, Skudenes, Stangaland, Torvastad and Åkra	Karmøy	1965
Skåre	Incorporated into Haugesund	Haugesund	1958
Sogndal	Incorporated into Sokndal	Sokndal	1944
Stangaland	Merged with Avaldsnes, Kopervik, Skudenes, Skudeneshavn, Torvastad and Åkra	Karmøy	1965
Torvastad	Merged with Avaldsnes, Kopervik, Skudenes, Skudeneshavn, Stangaland, and Åkra	Karmøy	1965
Vats	Merged with Imsland, Sandeid, Vikedal, and part of Skjold	Vindafjord	1965
Varhaug	Merged with Nærbø and Ogna	Hå	1964
Vikedal	Merged with Imsland, Sandeid, Vats, and part of Skjold	Vindafjord	1965
Ølen	Incorporated into Vindafjord	Vindafjord	2006
Åkra	Merged with Avaldsnes, Kopervik, Skudenes, Skudeneshavn, Stangaland, and Torvastad	Karmøy	1965
Årdal	Divided among several municipalities	Hjelmeland; Strand	1965

=== Sogn og Fjordane ===
Former	Fate	Result	Year
Balestrand	Divided between two municipalities	Høyanger; Sogndal	2020
Borgund	Incorporated into Lærdal	Lærdal	1964
Breim	Incorporated into Gloppen	Gloppen	1964
Brekke	Incorporated into Gulen	Gulen	1964
Bru	Merged with Eikefjord, Florø and Kinn	Flora	1964
Davik	Divided among several municipalities	Bremanger; Eid; Vågsøy	1964
Eid	Merged with Selje	Stad	2020
Eikefjord	Merged with Bru, Florø and Kinn	Flora	1964
Flora	Merged with Vågsøy	Kinn	2020
Florø	Merged with Bru, Eikefjord and Kinn	Flora	1964
Førde	Merged with Jølster, Gaular, and Naustdal	Sunnfjord	2020
Gaular	Merged with Førde, Jølster, and Naustdal	Sunnfjord	2020
Hafslo	Incorporated into Luster	Luster	1963
Hornindal	Incorporated into Volda	Volda	2020
Innvik	Incorporated into Stryn	Stryn	1965
Jostedal	Incorporated into Luster	Luster	1963
Jølster	Merged with Førde, Gaular, and Naustdal	Sunnfjord	2020
Kinn	Merged with Bru, Eikefjord and Florø	Flora	1964
Kyrkjebø	Merged with Lavik	Høyanger	1964
Lavik	Merged with Kyrkjebø	Høyanger	1964
Lavik og Brekke	Split in two	Lavik; Brekke	1905
Leikanger	Incorporated into Sogndal	Sogndal	2020
Naustdal	Merged with Førde, Jølster, and Gaular	Sunnfjord	2020
Nord-Vågsøy	Merged with Sør-Vågsøy	Vågsøy	1964
Selje	Merged with Eid	Stad	2020
Sør-Vågsøy	Merged with Nord-Vågsøy	Vågsøy	1964
Vevring	Divided among several municipalities	Askvoll; Naustdal	1964
Vågsøy	Merged with Flora	Kinn	2020

=== Telemark ===
Former	Fate	Result	Year
Brevik	Incorporated into Porsgrunn	Porsgrunn	1964
Bø	Merged with Sauherad	Midt-Telemark	2020
Eidanger	Incorporated into Porsgrunn	Porsgrunn	1964
Gjerpen	Incorporated into Skien	Skien	1964
Gransherad	Incorporated into Notodden	Notodden	1964
Heddal	Incorporated into Notodden	Notodden	1964
Holla	Merged with Lunde	Nome	1964
Hovin	Divided among several municipalities	Tinn; Notodden	1964
Langesund	Incorporated into Bamble	Bamble	1964
Lunde	Merged with Holla	Nome	1964
Lårdal	Merged with Mo	Tokke	1964
Mo	Merged with Lårdal	Tokke	1964
Rauland	Incorporated into Vinje	Vinje	1964
Sannidal	Incorporated into Kragerø	Kragerø	1960
Sauherad	Merged with Bø	Midt-Telemark	2020
Skåtøy	Incorporated into Kragerø	Kragerø	1960
Solum	Incorporated into Skien	Skien	1964
Stathelle	Incorporated into Bamble	Bamble	1964

=== Troms ===
Former	Fate	Result	Year
Andørja	Incorporated into Ibestad	Ibestad	1964
Astafjord	Incorporated into Skånland	Skånland	1964
Berg	Merged with Lenvik, Tranøy, and Torsken	Senja	2020
Bjarkøy	Incorporated into Harstad	Harstad	2013
Helgøy	Incorporated into Karlsøy	Karlsøy	1964
Hillesøy	Divided among several municipalities	Lenvik; Tromsø	1964
Lenvik	Merged with Berg, Tranøy, and Torsken	Senja	2020
Malangen	Incorporated into Balsfjord	Balsfjord	1964
Sandtorg	Merged with Harstad and Trondenes	Harstad	1964
Skånland	Incorporated into Tjeldsund	Tjeldsund	2020
Tranøy	Merged with Berg, Lenvik, and Torsken	Senja	2020
Torsken	Merged with Berg, Lenvik, and Tranøy	Senja	2020
Tromsøysund	Merged with Tromsø, Ullsfjord, and part of Hillesøy	Tromsø	1964
Trondenes	Merged with Harstad and Sandtorg	Harstad	1964
Ullsfjord	Merged with Tromsø, Tromsøysund, and part of Hillesøy	Tromsø	1964
Øverbygd	Incorporated into Målselv	Målselv	1964

=== Trøndelag ===
Former	Fate	Result	Year
Agdenes	Merged with Orkdal, Meldal, and part of Snillfjord	Orkland	2020
Beitstad	Incorporated into Steinkjer	Steinkjer	1964
Bjugn	Incorporated into Ørland	Ørland	2020
Bjørnør	Split in three	Osen; Roan; Stoksund	1892
Brekken	Merged with Glåmos, Røros landsogn, and Røros	Røros	1964
Budal	Merged with Singsås, Soknedal, and Støren	Midtre Gauldal	1964
Buvik	Incorporated into Skaun	Skaun	1965
Byneset	Incorporated into Trondheim	Trondheim	1964
Børsa	Incorporated into Skaun	Skaun	1965
Egge	Incorporated into Steinkjer	Steinkjer	1964
Fillan	Incorporated into Hitra	Hitra	1964
Flå	Incorporated into Melhus	Melhus	1964
Foldereid	Divided among several municipalities	Høylandet; Nærøy	1964
Fosnes	Merged with Namsos and Namdalseid	Namsos	2020
Frol	Incorporated into Levanger	Levanger	1962
Geitastrand	Incorporated into Orkdal	Orkdal	1963
Glåmos	Merged with Brekken, Røros landsogn, and Røros	Røros	1964
Gravvik	Incorporated into Nærøy	Nærøy	1964
Haltdalen	Merged with Ålen	Holtålen	1972
Harran	Incorporated into Grong	Grong	1964
Hegra	Incorporated into Stjørdal	Stjørdal	1962
Heim	Divided among several municipalities	Hemne; Snillfjord	1964
Hemne	Merged with Halsa and part of Snillfjord	Heim	2020
Horg	Incorporated into Melhus	Melhus	1964
Hølonda	Incorporated into Melhus	Melhus	1964
Jøssund	Incorporated into Bjugn	Bjugn	1964
Klinga	Incorporated into Namsos	Namsos	1964
Klæbu	Incorporate into Trondheim	Trondheim	2020
Kolvereid	Incorporated into Nærøy	Nærøy	1964
Kvam	Incorporated into Steinkjer	Steinkjer	1964
Kvenvær	Incorporated into Hitra	Hitra	1964
Leinstrand	Incorporated into Trondheim	Trondheim	1964
Leksvik	Merged with Rissa	Indre Fosen	2018
Lensvik	Incorporated into Agdenes	Agdenes	1964
Lånke	Incorporated into Stjørdal	Stjørdal	1962
Malm	Incorporated into Verran	Verran	1964
Meldal	Merged with Agdenes, Orkdal, and part of Snillfjord	Orkland	2020
Mosvik og Verran	Split in two	Mosvik; Verran	1901
Mosvik	Incorporated into Inderøy	Inderøy	2012
Namdalseid	Merged with Namsos and Fosnes	Namsos	2020
Nedre Stjørdalen	Split in three	Lånke; Skatval; Stjørdal	1902
Nes	Incorporated into Bjugn	Bjugn	1964
Nord-Frøya	Merged with Sør-Frøya	Frøya	1964
Nordli	Merged with Sørli	Lierne	1964
Nærøy	Merged with Vikna	Nærøysund	2020
Ogndal	Incorporated into Steinkjer	Steinkjer	1964
Orkanger	Incorporated into Orkdal	Orkdal	1963
Orkdal	Merged with Agdenes, Meldal, and part of Snillfjord	Orkland	2020
Orkland	Incorporated into Orkdal	Orkdal	1963
Otterøy	Divided among several municipalities	Namdalseid; Namsos	1964
Rissa	Merged with Leksvik	Indre Fosen	2018
Roan	Incorporate into Åfjord	Åfjord	2020
Røra	Incorporated into Inderøy	Inderøy	1962
Røros landsogn	Merged with Brekken, Glåmos, and Røros	Røros	1964
Sandstad	Incorporated into Hitra	Hitra	1964
Sandvollan	Incorporated into Inderøy	Inderøy	1962
Singsås	Merged with Budal, Soknedal and Støren	Midtre Gauldal	1964
Skatval	Incorporated into Stjørdal	Stjørdal	1962
Skogn	Incorporated into Levanger	Levanger	1962
Snillfjord	Divided among several municipalities	Orkland; Hitra; Heim	2020
Soknedal	Merged with Budal, Singsås and Støren	Midtre Gauldal	1964
Sparbu	Incorporated into Steinkjer	Steinkjer	1964
Stadsbygd	Divided among several municipalities	Rissa; Agdenes	1964
Stjørdalen	Split in two	Nedre Stjørdalen; Øvre Stjørdalen	1850
Stjørna	Divided among several municipalities	Bjugn; Rissa	1964
Stoksund	Incorporated into Åfjord	Åfjord	1964
Stod	Incorporated into Steinkjer	Steinkjer	1964
Strinda	Incorporated into Trondheim	Trondheim	1964
Støren	Merged with Budal, Singsås, and Soknedal	Midtre Gauldal	1964
Sør-Frøya	Merged with Nord-Frøya	Frøya	1964
Sørli	Merged with Nordli	Lierne	1964
Tiller	Incorporated into Trondheim	Trondheim	1964
Vemundvik	Incorporated into Namsos	Namsos	1964
Verran	Divided between two municipalities	Indre Fosen; Steinkjer	2020
Vikna	Merged with Nærøy	Nærøysund	2020
Vinje	Incorporated into Hemne	Hemne	1964
Ytterøy	Incorporated into Levanger	Levanger	1964
Øvre Stjørdalen	Split in two	Hegra; Meråker	1874
Ålen	Merged with Haltdalen	Holtålen	1972
Åsen	Incorporated into Levanger	Levanger	1962

=== Vest-Agder ===
Former	Fate	Result	Year
Audnedal	Incorporated into Lyngdal	Lyngdal	2020
Austad	Incorporated into Lyngdal Municipality	Lyngdal	1963
Bakke	Incorporated into Flekkefjord	Flekkefjord	1965
Bjelland	Merged with Laudal and Øyslebø	Marnardal	1964
Bjelland og Grindum	Split in two	Bjelland; Grindum	1902
Eiken	Incorporated into Hægebostad	Hægebostad	1963
Feda	Incorporated into Kvinesdal	Kvinesdal	1963
Finsland	Merged with Greipstad	Songdalen	1964
Fjotland	Incorporated into Kvinesdal	Kvinesdal	1963
Greipstad	Merged with Finsland	Songdalen	1964
Grindheim	Merged with Konsmo	Audnedal	1964
Gyland	Incorporated into Flekkefjord	Flekkefjord	1965
Halse og Harkmark	Incorporated into Mandal	Mandal	1964
Herad	Incorporated into Farsund	Farsund	1965
Hidra	Incorporated into Flekkefjord	Flekkefjord	1965
Holum	Incorporated into Mandal	Mandal	1964
Hægeland	Incorporated into Vennesla	Vennesla	1964
Konsmo	Merged with Grindheim	Audnedal	1964
Kvås	Incorporated into Lyngdal	Lyngdal	1963
Laudal	Merged with Bjelland and Øyslebø	Marnardal	1964
Lista	Incorporated into Farsund	Farsund	1965
Mandal	Merged with Marnardal and Lindesnes	Lindesnes	2020
Marnardal	Merged with Mandal and Lindesnes	Lindesnes	2020
Nes	Incorporated into Flekkefjord	Flekkefjord	1965
Nes og Hitterø	Split in two	Hitterø; Nes	1893
Nord-Audnedal	Split in two	Konsmo; Vigmostad	1919
Oddernes	Incorporated into Kristiansand	Kristiansand	1965
andesund	Incorporated into Kristiansand	Kristiansand	1965
Songdalen	Merged with Kristiansand and Søgne	Kristiansand	2020
Spangereid	Merged with Sør-Audnedal and Vigmostad	Lindesnes	1964
Spind	Incorporated into Farsund	Farsund	1965
Søgne	Merged with Kristiansand and Songdalen	Kristiansand	2020
Sør-Audnedal	Merged with Spangereid and Vigmostad	Lindesnes	1964
Tonstad	Merged with Øvre Sirdal	Sirdal	1960
Tveit	Incorporated into Kristiansand	Kristiansand	1965
Undal	Split in two	Nord-Undal; Sør-Undal	1845
Vigmostad	Merged with Spangereid and Sør-Audnedal	Lindesnes	1964
Øvre Sirdal	Merged with Tonstad	Sirdal	1960
Øvrebø	Incorporated into Vennesla	Vennesla	1964
Øvrebø og Hægeland	Split in two	Hægeland; Øvrebø	1896
Øyslebø	Merged with Bjelland and Laudal	Marnardal	1964
Øyslebø og Laudal	Split in two	Laudal; Øyslebø	1899

=== Vestfold ===
Former	Fate	Result	Year
Andebu	Incorporated into Sandefjord	Sandefjord	2017
Borre	Merged with Horten; The resulting municipality was called "Borre" from 1988 to 2002	Horten	1988
Botne	Merged with Holmestrand	Holmestrand	1964
Brunlanes	Merged with Larvik, Hedrum, Stavern, and Tjølling	Larvik	1988
Hedrum	Merged with Larvik, Brunlanes, Stavern, and Tjølling	Larvik	1988
Hof	Incorporated into Holmestrand	Holmestrand	2018
Lardal	Incorporated into Larvik	Larvik	2018
Nøtterøy	Merged with Tjøme	Færder	2018
Ramnes	Merged with Våle	Re	2002
Re	Incorporated into Tønsberg	Tønsberg	2020
Sandar	Merged with Sandefjord	Sandefjord	1968
Sande	Incorporated into Holmestrand	Holmestrand	2020
Sem	Incorporated into Tønsberg	Tønsberg	1988
Skoger	Incorporated into Drammen (and moved to Buskerud county)	Drammen	1964
Stavern	Merged with Larvik, Brunlanes, Hedrum, and Tjølling	Larvik	1988
Stokke	Incorporated into Sandefjord	Sandefjord	2017
Strømm	Incorporated into Svelvik	Svelvik	1964
Svelvik	Incorporated into Drammen (moved to Viken in 2020; Viken dissolved 1 January 2024 — now in Buskerud)	Drammen	2020
Tjølling	Merged with Larvik, Brunlanes, Hedrum, and Stavern	Larvik	1988
Tjøme	Merged with Nøtterøy	Færder	2018
Våle	Merged with Ramnes	Re	2002
Åsgårdstrand	Incorporated into Borre	Borre	1965

=== Østfold ===
Former	Fate	Result	Year
Askim	Merged with Eidsberg, Hobøl, Spydeberg, and Trøgstad	Indre Østfold	2020
Berg	Incorporated into Halden	Halden	1967
Borge	Incorporated into Fredrikstad	Fredrikstad	1994
Degernes	Incorporated into Rakkestad	Rakkestad	1964
Eidsberg	Merged with Askim, Hobøl, Spydeberg, and Trøgstad	Indre Østfold	2020
Glemmen	Incorporated into Fredrikstad	Fredrikstad	1964
Hobøl	Merged with Askim, Eidsberg, Spydeberg, and Trøgstad	Indre Østfold	2020
Idd	Incorporated into Halden	Halden	1967
Jeløy	Incorporated into Moss	Moss	1943
Kråkerøy	Incorporated into Fredrikstad	Fredrikstad	1994
Mysen	Incorporated into Eidsberg	Eidsberg	1961
Onsøy	Incorporated into Fredrikstad	Fredrikstad	1994
Rømskog	Merged with Aurskog-Høland	Aurskog-Høland	2020
Rolvsøy	Incorporated into Fredrikstad	Fredrikstad	1994
Rygge	Incorporated into Moss	Moss	2020
Rødenes	Merged with Øymark	Marker	1964
Skjeberg	Incorporated into Sarpsborg	Sarpsborg	1992
Spydeberg	Merged with Askim, Eidsberg, Hobøl, and Trøgstad	Indre Østfold	2020
Torsnes	Incorporated into Borge	Borge	1964
Trøgstad	Merged with Askim, Eidsberg, Hobøl, and Spydeberg	Indre Østfold	2020
Tune	Incorporated into Sarpsborg	Sarpsborg	1992
Varteig	Incorporated into Sarpsborg	Sarpsborg	1992
Øymark	Merged with Rødenes	Marker	1964
