= Setten =

Lake in Akershus, Norway

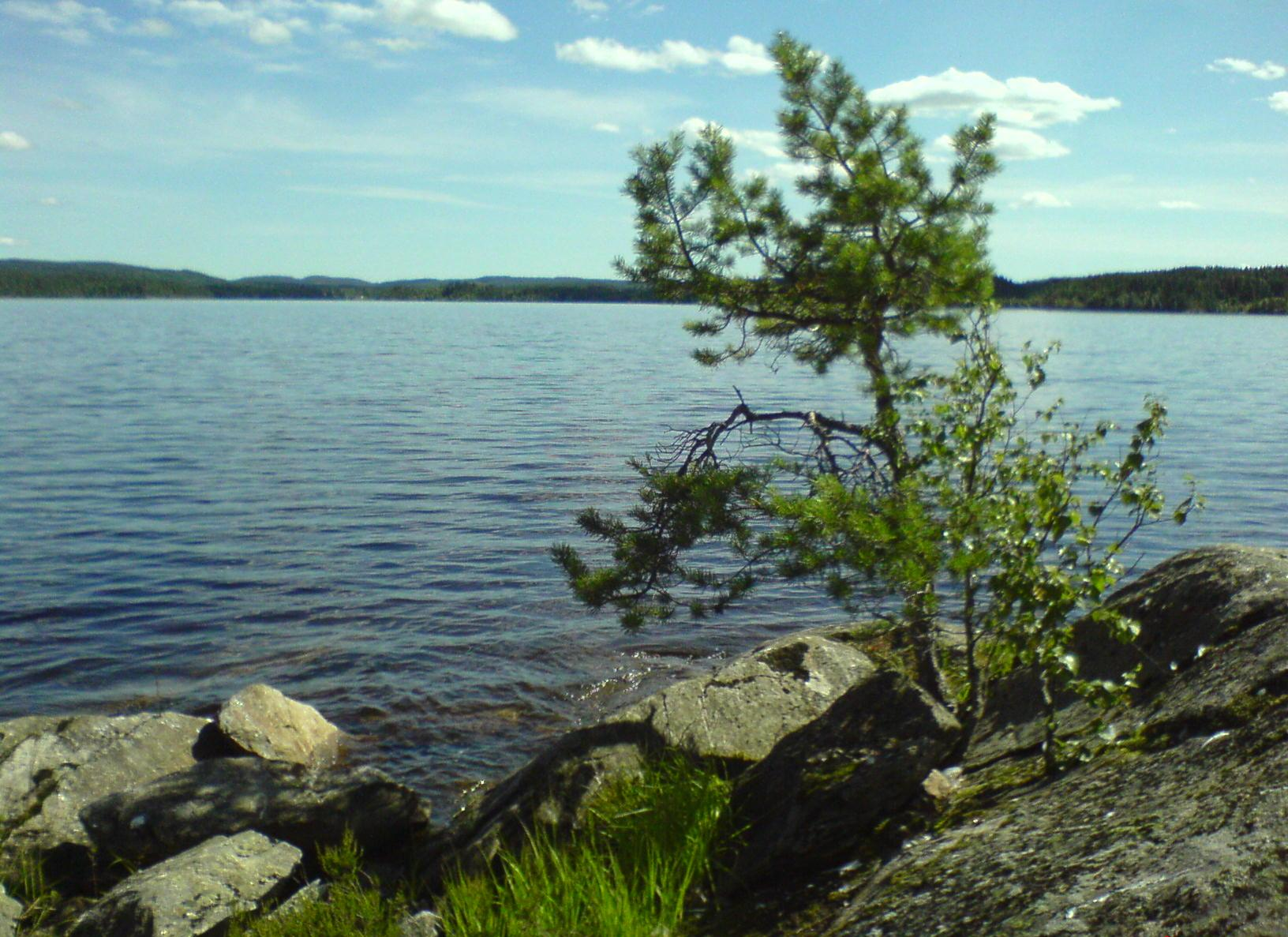
- Setten - seen from the Strøvik area
- Interactive map of the lake
- Location: Aurskog-Høland, Akershus
- Coordinates: 59.8307°N 11.6780°E
- Basin countries: Norway
- Surface area: 11.97 km^{2} (4.62 sq mi)
- Shore length^{1}: 58.77 kilometres (36.52 mi)
- Surface elevation: 167 metres (548 ft)
- References: NVE
- ^{1} Shore length is not a well-defined measure.

Setten is a lake that in Aurskog-Høland Municipality in Akershus county, Norway. The lake lies on the west side of the village of Setskog in typical forest terrain. The lake has many bays and small islands, and is a popular canoeing, fishing and camping area. The lake is part of the Haldenvassdraget, and empties into Mjermen.

The fishing in Setten consists of northern pike, European perch, common roach, common bleak and burbot.

Setten was part of the large canal system that ran from Eidskog Municipality via the Soot Canal, to Mjermen and later to the lake at Haldensvassdraget. The Soot Canal has its start at Setten with Tangen in the north and later down by boat to Kolstad in the south.

== See also ==
- List of lakes in Norway
