= Høland =

Former municipality in Akershus, Norway

Coordinates: 59°43′57″N 11°26′15″E

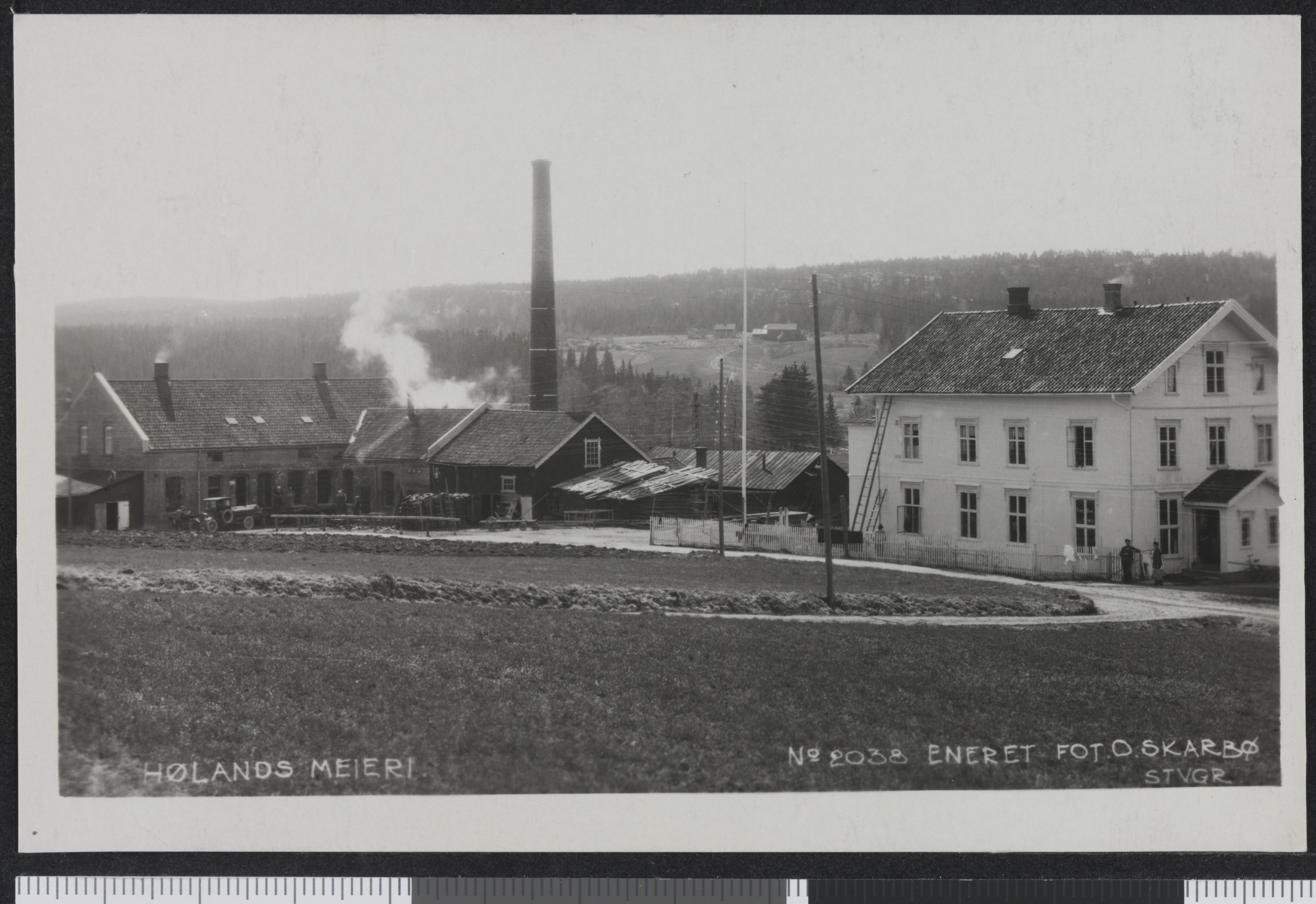
Historical photograph of Hølands meieri in Høland, Norway

Høland is a former municipality in Akershus county, Norway.

== History ==
Høland was created in 1837 as a formannskapsdistrikt, a Norwegian local self-government district. The district Setskog was separated from Høland to form a separate municipality January 1, 1905. The split left Høland with 4,928 inhabitants. Høland municipality existed until 1 July 1924, when it was split to form the two new municipalities of Nordre Høland and Søndre Høland. Before the partition Høland had a population of 5,294. On 1 January 1966, Nordre Høland and Søndre Høland, were merged with Setskog and Aurskog to form the new municipality of Aurskog-Høland.

== Origins of the Name ==
The name Høland is an old, historic district name. The first element is høy meaning hay. The last element is land meaning land (originally in plural).

== People From Høland ==
- Hjalmar Holand, Norwegian-American historian and author.
