= Søndre Høland =

Former municipality in Akershus, Norway

Coordinates: 59.7175°N 11.4486°E

Søndre Høland is a former municipality in Akershus county, Norway.

It was created when Høland municipality was split in two on 1 July 1924. At that time Søndre Høland had a population of 2,106.

On 1 January 1964 Søndre Høland was merged with Nordre Høland, Setskog and Aurskog to form the new municipality Aurskog-Høland. Prior to the merger Søndre Høland had a population of 2,173.
