= Nordre Høland =

Former municipality in Akershus, Norway

Nordre Høland is a former municipality in Akershus county, Norway.

It was created when Høland municipality was split in two on 1 July 1924. At that time Nordre Høland had a population of 3.188.

On 1 January 1966 Nordre Høland was merged with Søndre Høland, Setskog and Aurskog to form the new municipality Aurskog-Høland. Prior to the merger Nordre Høland had a population of 4.261.
