= Gol og Hemsedal =

Former municipality in Buskerud county, Norway

Coordinates: 60°48′31″N 8°41′41″E

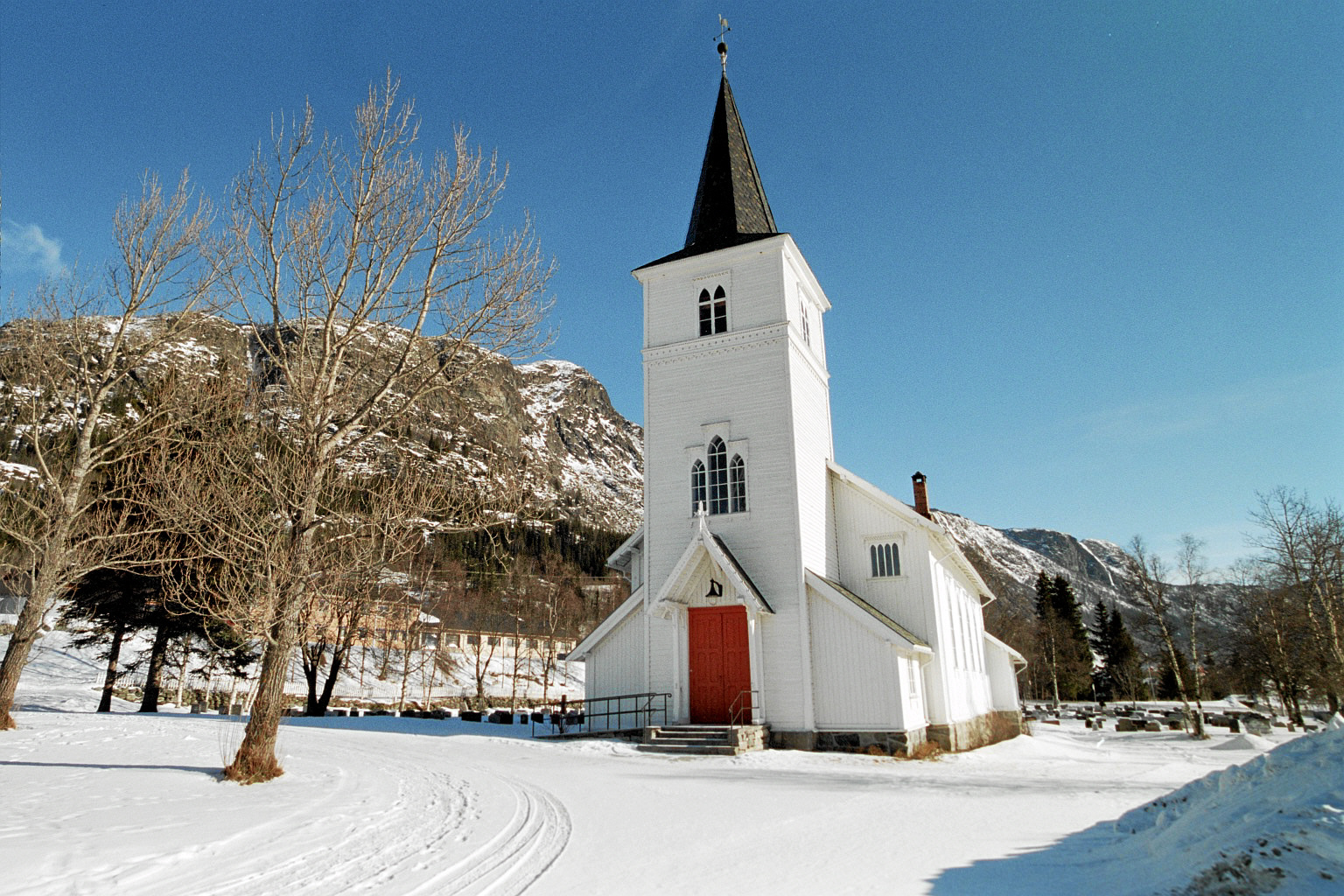
Hemsedal Church in Buskerud county, Norway

Gol og Hemsedal is a former municipality in Buskerud county, Norway.

The municipality of Goel og Hemsedal was created in 1837 formannskapsdistrikt. According to the 1835 census the municipality had a population of 3,645.

On 1 January 1897 Gol og Hemsedal was split to create two municipalities: Gol with a population of 2,384 and Hemsedal with a population of 1,499. Both municipalities still exist.
