= Tyristrand =

Village in Ringerike Municipality, Norway

Coordinates: 60°06′N 10°06′E

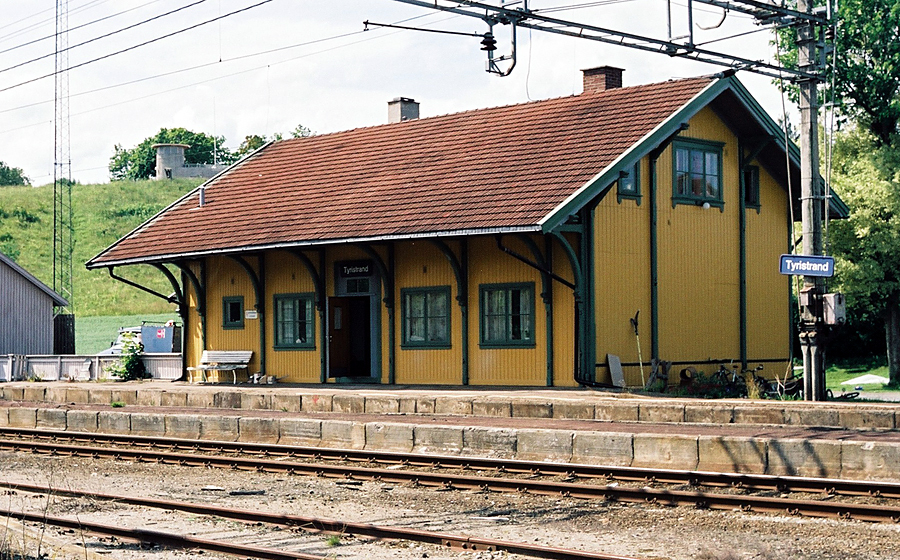
Tyristrand Train Station

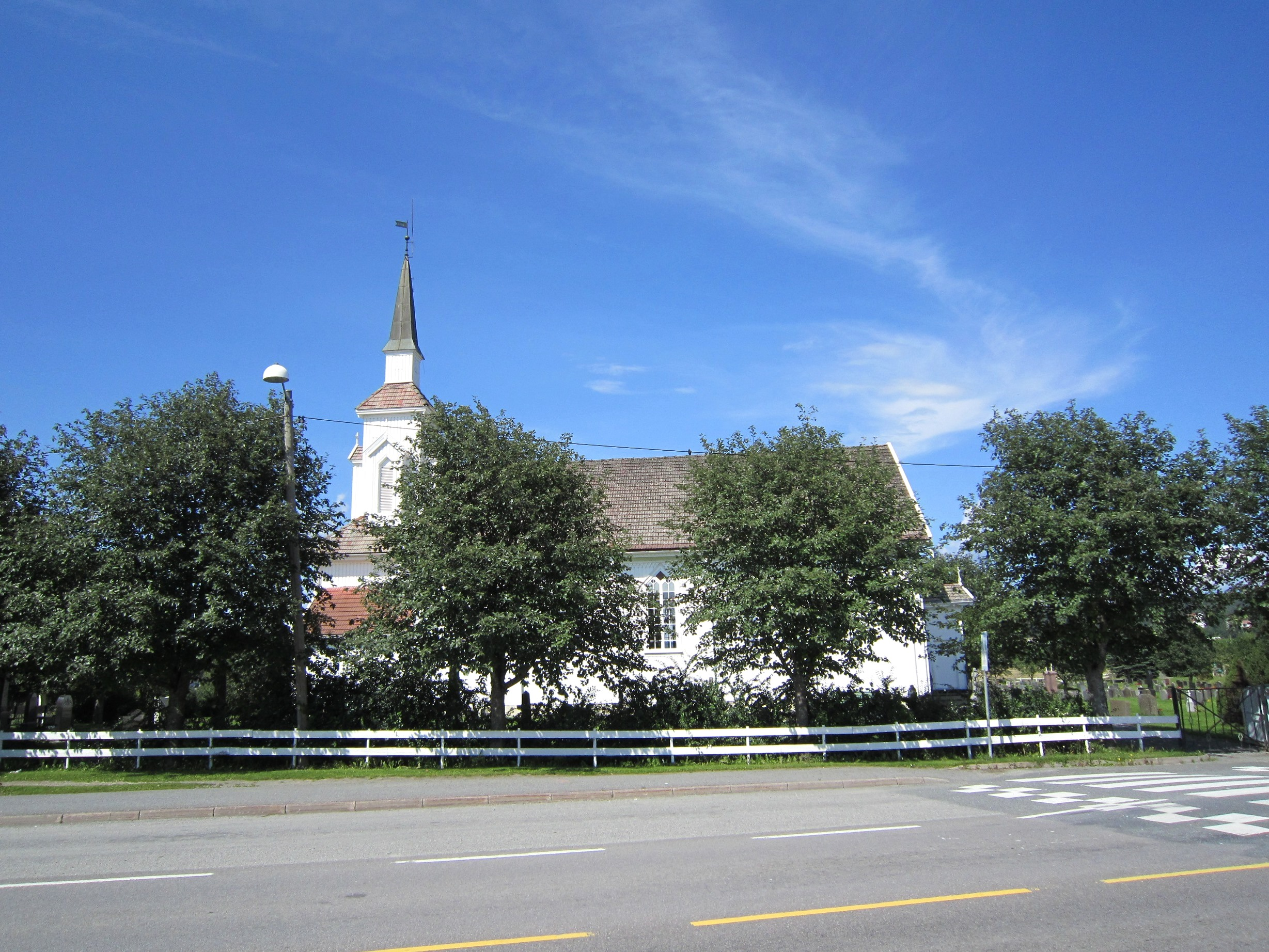
Tyristrand Church in Ringerike

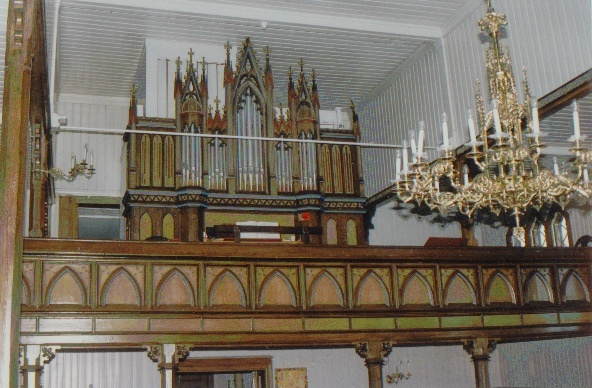
Organ of Tyristrand Church

Tyristrand is a village in Ringerike municipality in Buskerud county, Norway.

== Background ==
Tyristrand parish was designated a municipality following a split from Hole on 1 July 1916. The municipality of Hole made been established on 1 January 1838 (see formannskapsdistrikt). On 1 January 1964 Tyristrand was merged with the municipalities Hole, Hønefoss, Norderhov and Ådal to form the new municipality of Ringerike. Before the merger, Tyristrand had a population of 1,714. The village of Tyristrand is located on the western shore of Tyrifjorden, between Hønefoss and Vikersund.

== Randsfjord Line ==
The Norwegian legislature decided in 1863 to build the Randsfjord Line railway system. The first stretch of the line opened in 1866 between Vikersund and Drammen. During 1867, Skjærdalen and Tyristrand were connected to the line and in 1868 Hønefoss Station opened and the line could stretch all the way to Randsfjorden.

== Tyristrand Church ==
Using the drawings of the notable architect Christian Heinrich Grosch, the Tyristrand Church (Tyristrand kirke) was built during the years 1856–1857. Grosch was born in Copenhagen, but he lived most of his adult life in Kristiania (now Oslo). He designed several well-known buildings that are still standing, and this church is one of these. The building site for the church including space for a graveyard surrounding it and a grassy meadow were given by Consul Bache of Drammen, who owned Skjaerdalen's ground at the time.

== Etymology ==
Tyristrand derived its name from its location on the western shore of Tyrifjorden, Norway's fifth largest lake. Tyristrand is a compound word derived from two Old Norse terms. The first part of the name is derived from the word tyri meaning pine (wood) that is old or dead. The second part of the name is derived from the word strand meaning beach or shore.
