= Norderhov =

Former Municipality in Norway

Coordinates: 60°7′45″N 10°16′49″E

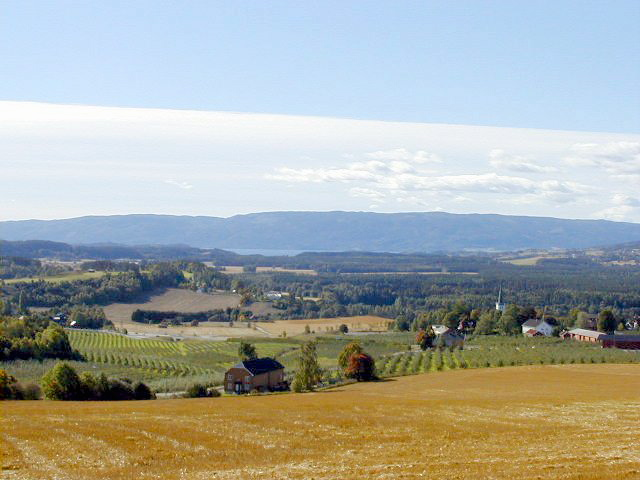
Norderhov in Ringerike

Norderhov is a former municipality located within Ringerike in Buskerud county, Norway.

== Municipality ==
Norderhov municipality was established on January 1, 1838 (see formannskapsdistrikt). According to the 1835 census the municipality had a population of 7,234. On 22 April 1852 the city of Hønefoss was separated from Norderhov to constitute a separate administrative unit. In 1857 the rural district Ådal was separated from Norderhov, leaving Norderhov with a population of 6,846.

In 1938 a part of Norderhov with 268 inhabitants was moved to Hønefoss, and on 1 January 1964 the rest was merged with Hønefoss, Ådal, Tyristrand and Hole to form the new municipality Ringerike. Norderhov was by far the largest municipality prior to the merger, with a population of 15,143.

== Parish ==
The municipality (originally the parish) was named after the old farm Norderhov (Old Norse: Njardarhof), since the first church was built there. The first element is the genitive case of the name Njord, the last element is hof, Old Norse for 'temple'. Until 1865 the name was written Norderhoug. The parish of Norderhov (Norderhov prestegjeld) included churches located at Norderhov, Haug, Lunder, Tyristrand, Ådal, Veme and Hønefoss.

== Ringerikes Museum ==
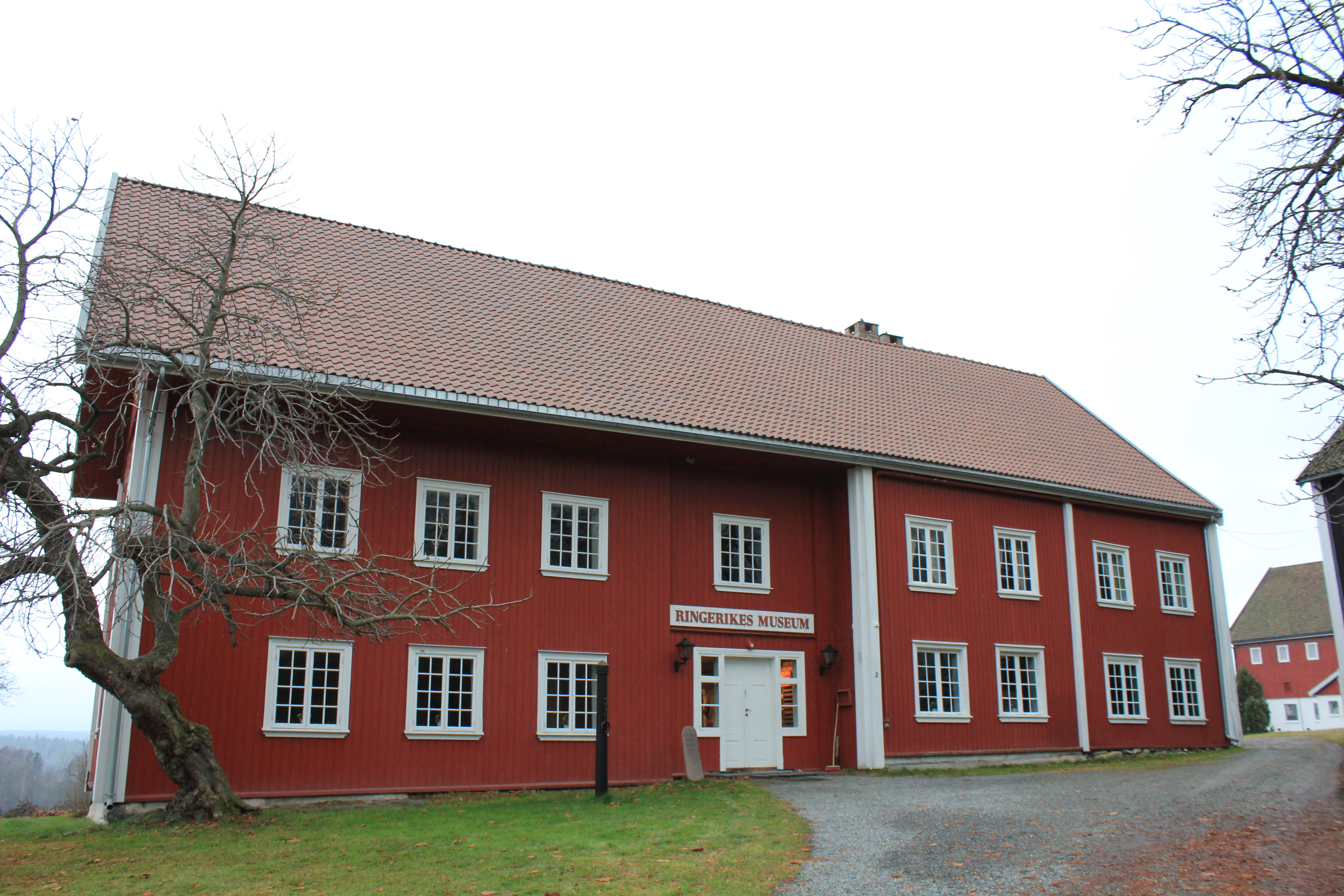
Ringerikes Museum

Ringerikes museum was founded in 1923. It is the regional museum for the municipalities of Hole and Ringerike in Buskerud county. Ringerikes Museum is located at the site of the former rectory of Norderhov Church which it moved into around 1960. Stiftelsen Ringerikes Museum owns and Stiftelsen Hringariki operates the museum.

The museum is noted for its collection of icons and runestones, as well as for its memorabilia relating to authors Peter Christen Asbjørnsen and Jørgen Moe. The Icon Collection at the museum was donated by the artist Hans Ødegaard. The collection contains icons from the Baltics, Greece and Russia, the oldest dating back to the 1400s. Hjemmestyrkemuseet, located on the first floor of Ringerike museum, shows weapons and equipment from the German occupation of Norway.

== Norderhov Church ==
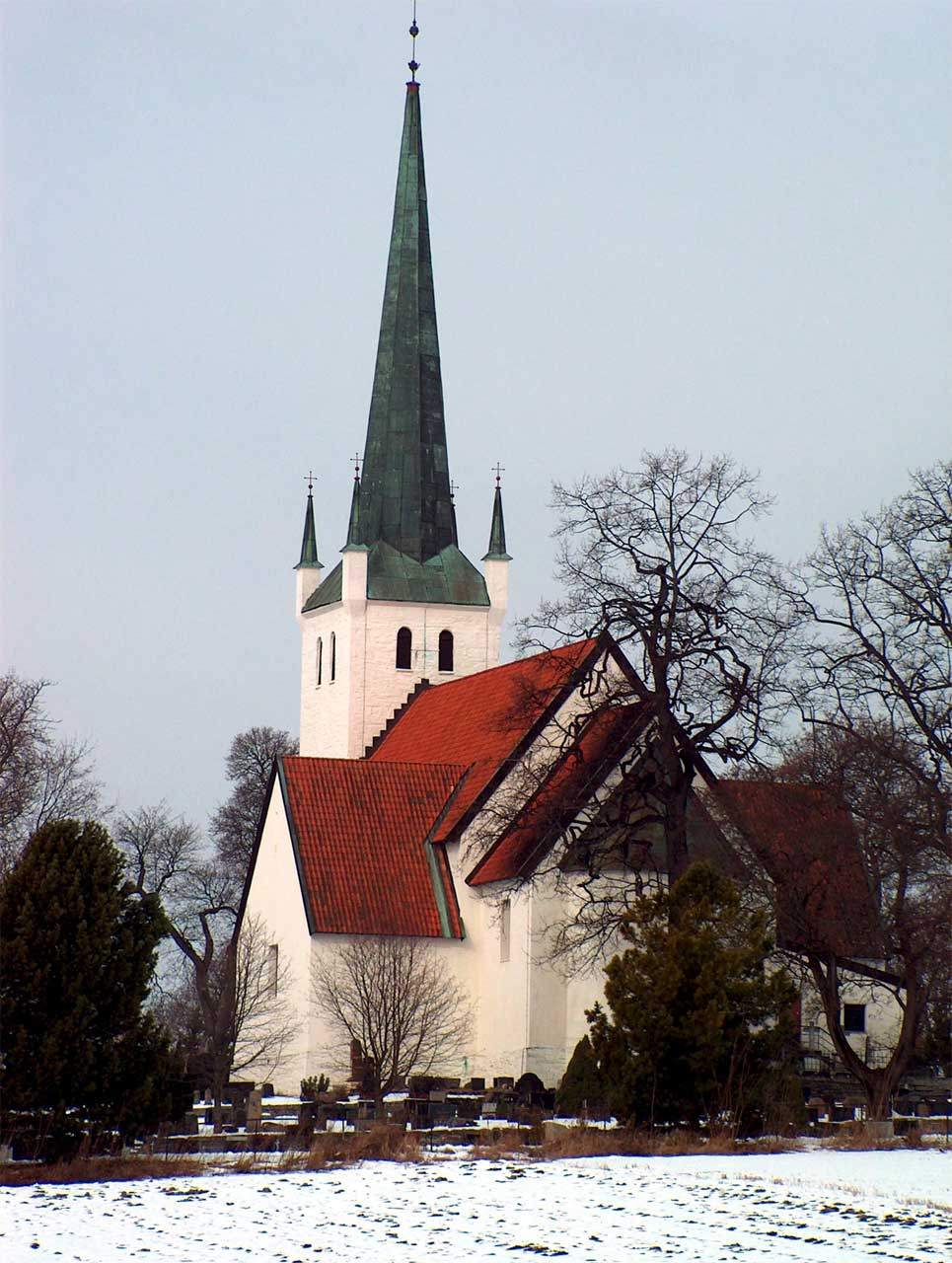
Norderhov Church

Norderhov church (Norderhov kirke) is a medieval church which has been rebuilt and expanded into a cruciform church. It is located in Norderhov just south of Hønefoss. The church was originally built as a church of stone approx. 1170. The construction may be related to the establishment of the Diocese of Hamar in 1153. Norderhov Church has a recorded history dating to an announcement for Ringerike issued in 1298 by Duke Hakon Magnusson, who later became King Haakon V. The church is most known for it close connection with Anna Colbjørnsdatter and with the Skirmish at Norderhov.

The church was renovated in 1771, 1796 and 1809–1810. The sacristy was extended to the east and with new, larger windows and a new lower ceiling and a new choir loft in 1881–1882. Meanwhile, the tower spire was covered with copper plates and the church was refurbished. A new chapel was erected on the north side of the church in 1910–1912. The church was restored again in 1926 and 1953–1956.

== Skirmish at Norderhov ==
Norderhov church was the site of the Skirmish at Norderhov (Slaget på Norderhov). Late on the evening of 28 March 1716, an army of King Charles XII of Sweden was confronted by Norwegian forces. The Swedish troops had taken shelter in and by the old Norderhov rectory. Anna Colbjørnsdatter, the spouse of pastor Jonas Danilssønn Ramus, sent an alert to Norwegians forces about the presence of the Swedes. The event itself was published by Peter Andreas Munch in his book Norges, Sveriges og Danmarks Historie til Skolebrug (1838).

== Norderhov Church gallery ==
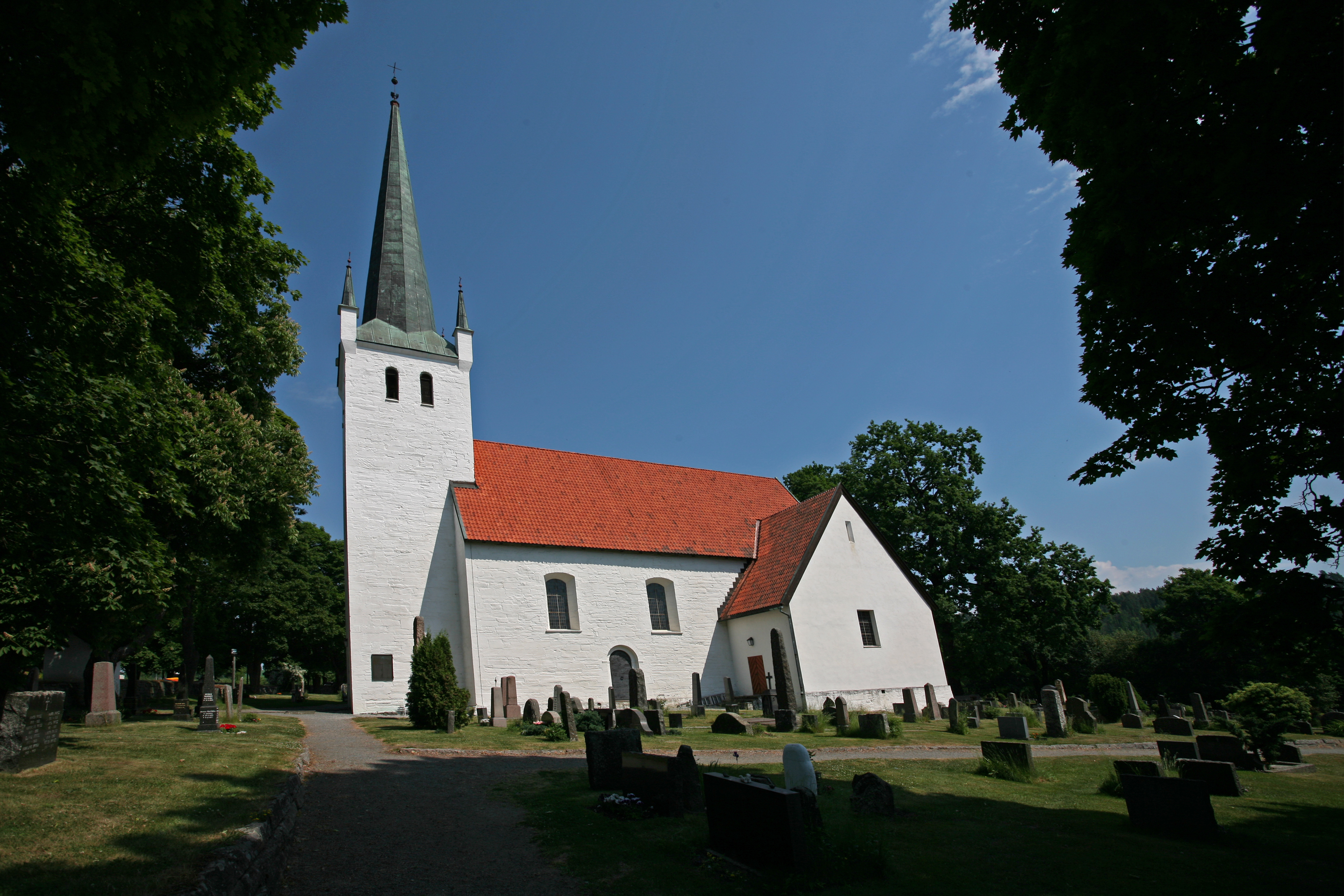
Norderhov Church, exterior

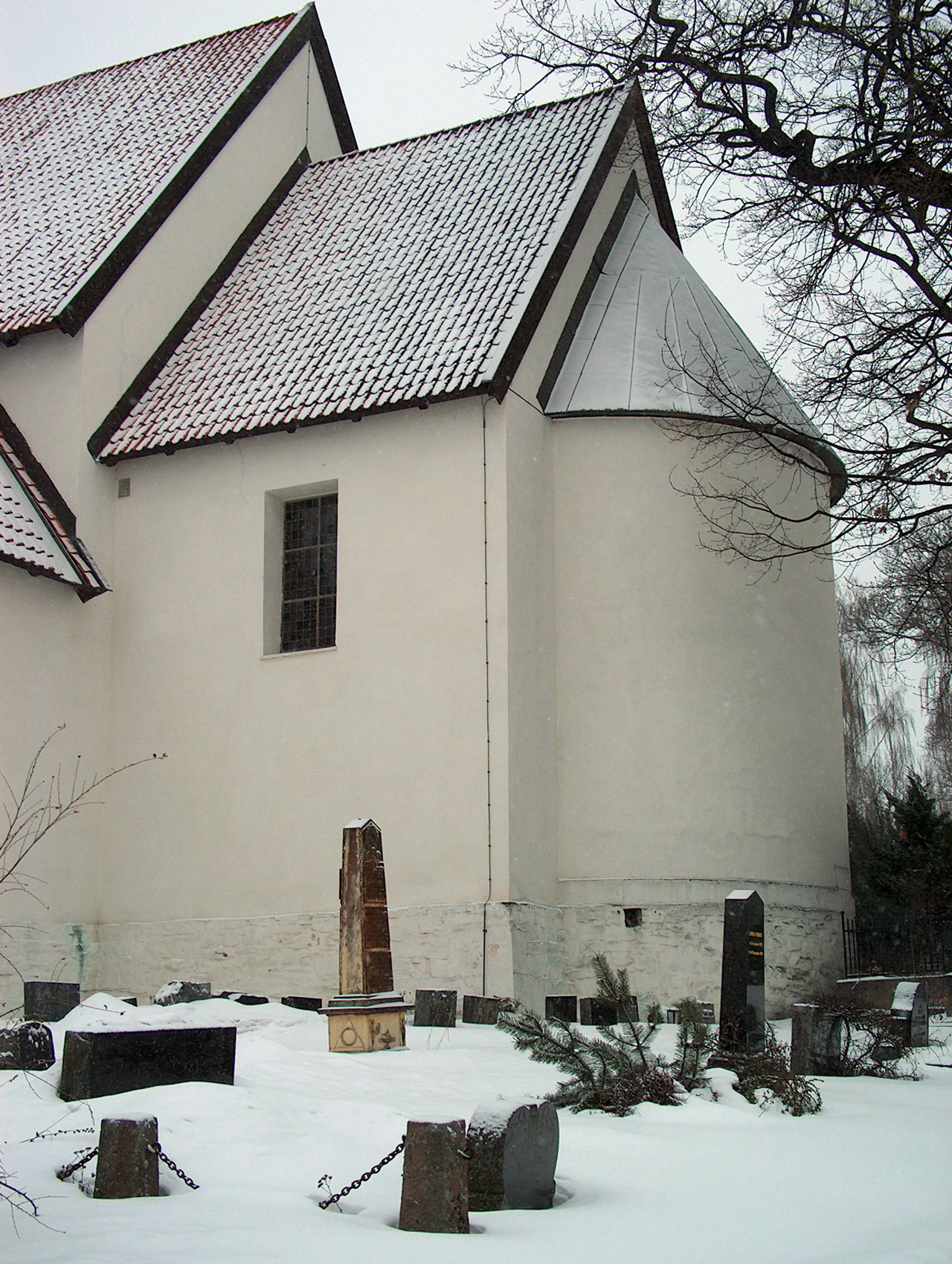
Norderhov Church chancel and apse

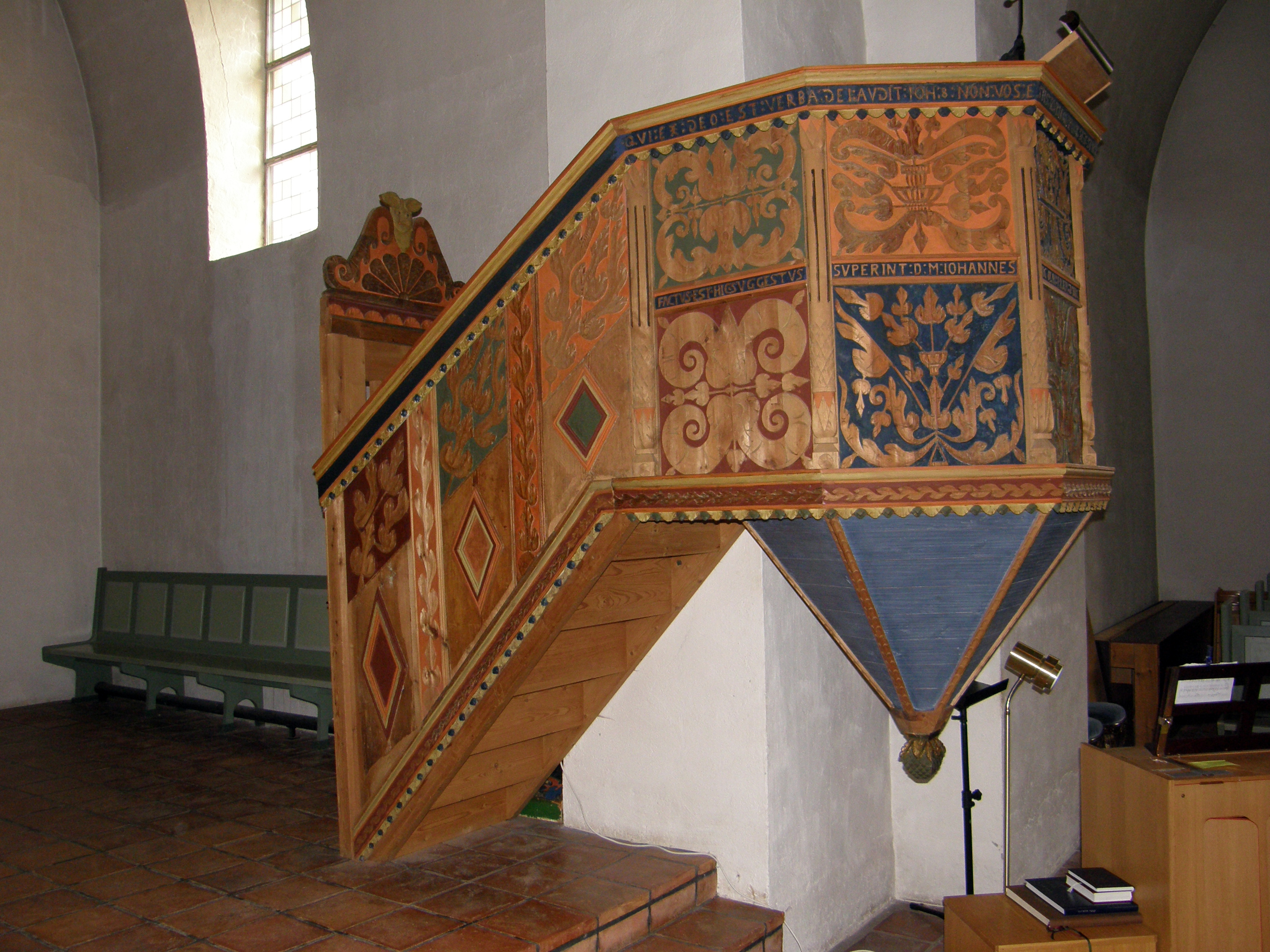
Norderhov Church pulpit

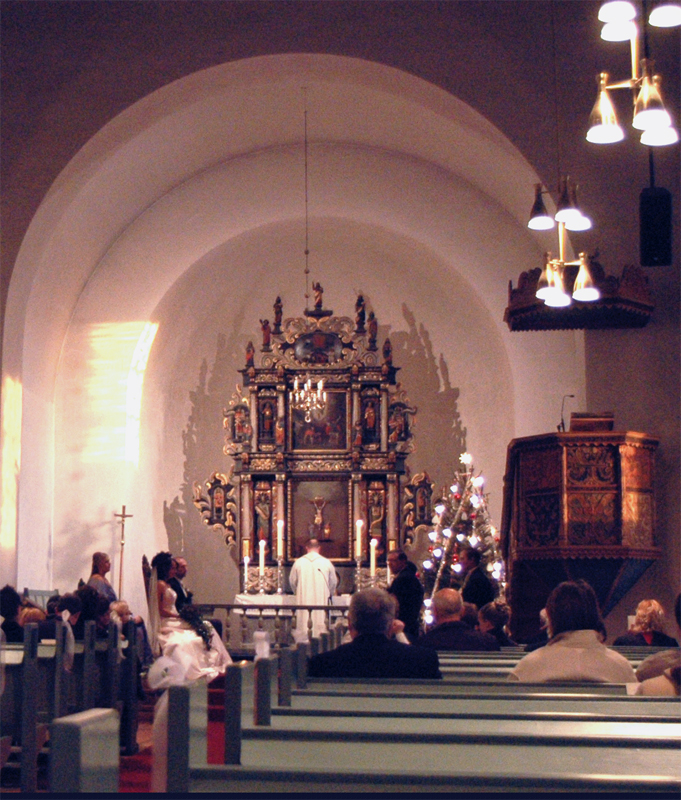
Norderhov Church sanctuary

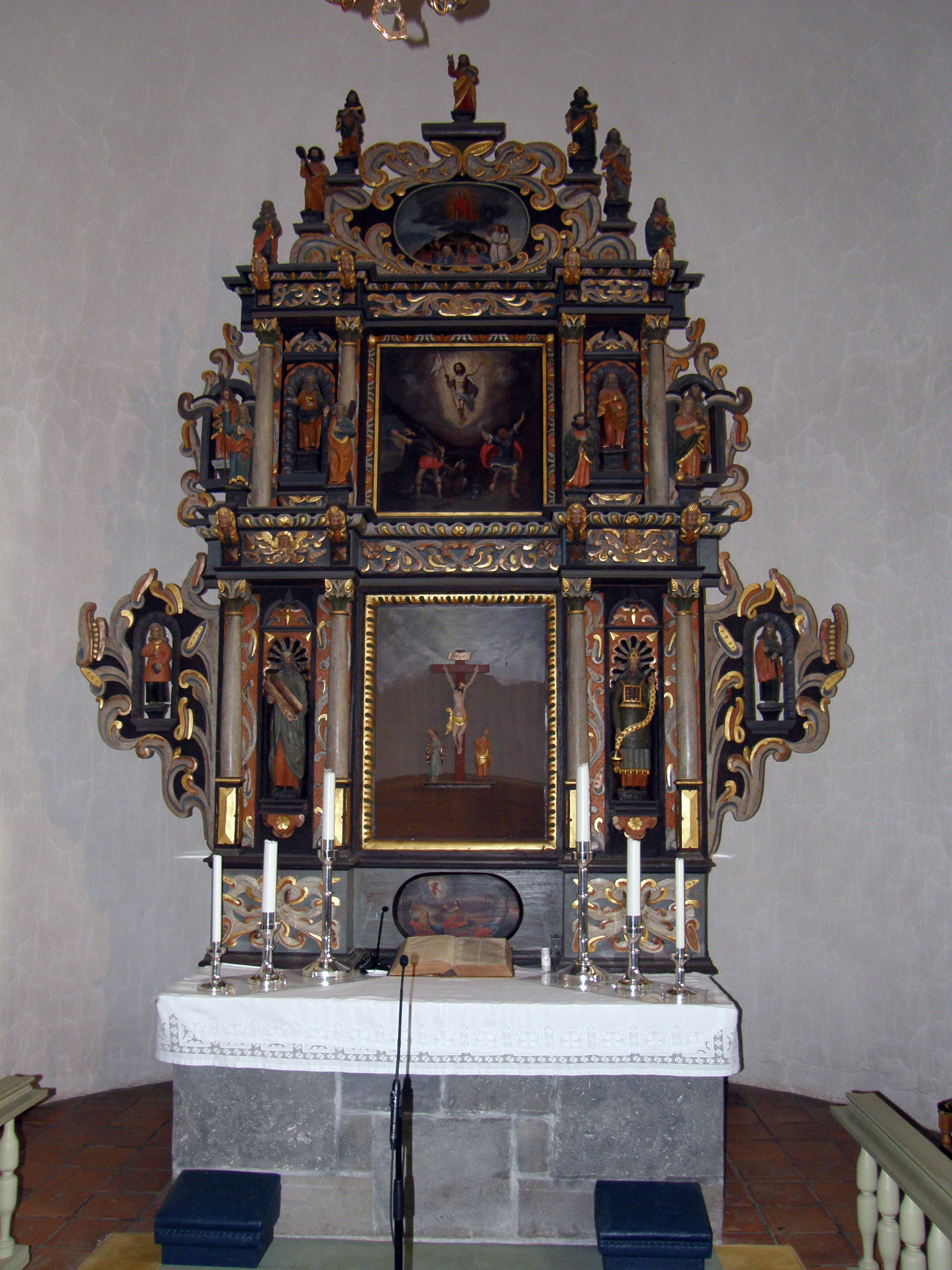
Norderhov Church altar

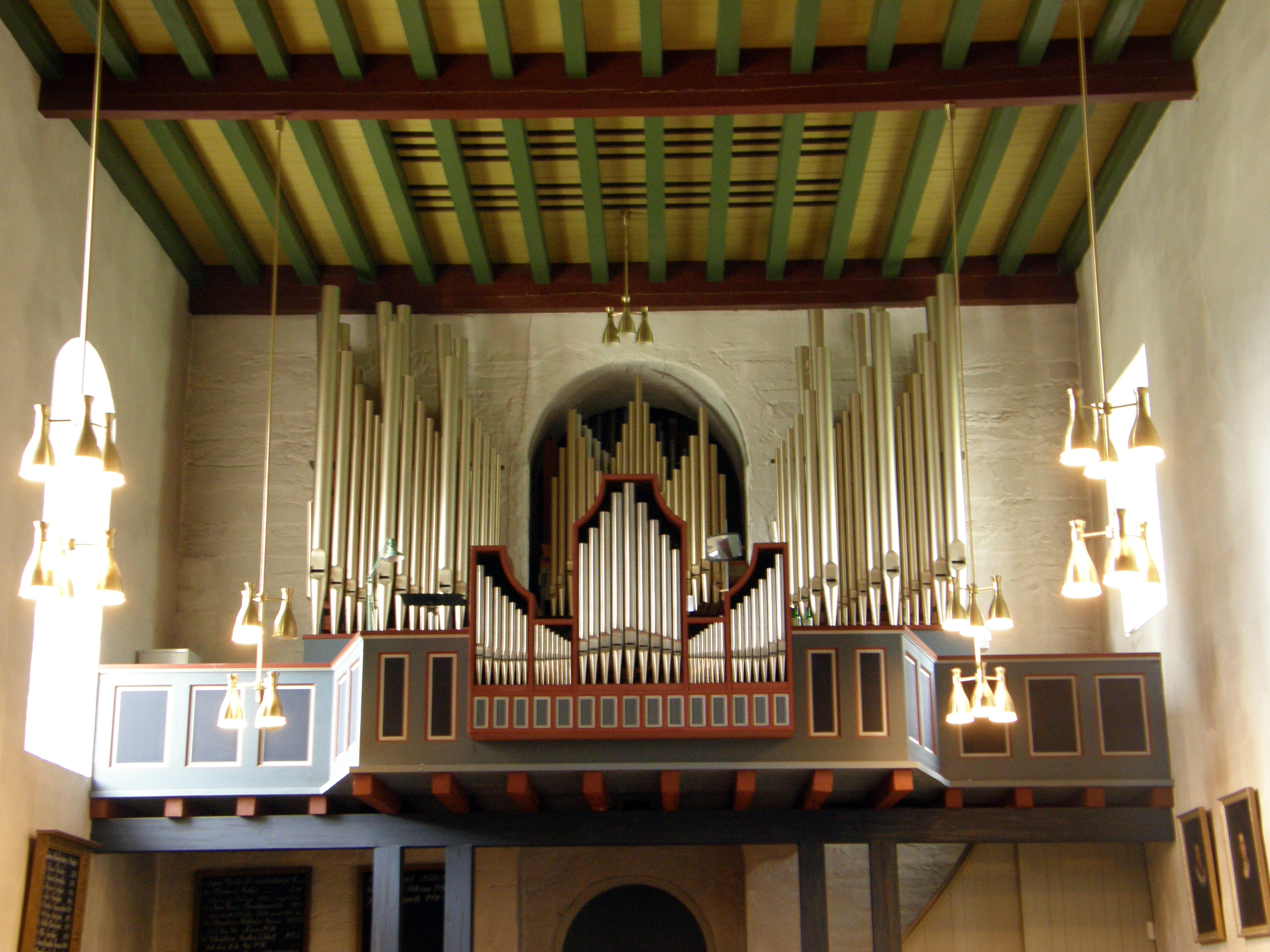
Norderhov Church organ

== Other sources ==
- A. B. Bang (1966) Jonas Ramus og Anna Colbjørnsdatter
- Per Holck (2003) Anna Colbjørnsdatter og Jonas Ramus i Norderhov kirke
- Michael Johan Færden (1910) Kampene paa Hadeland og i Norderhov
