= Setskog =

- Village
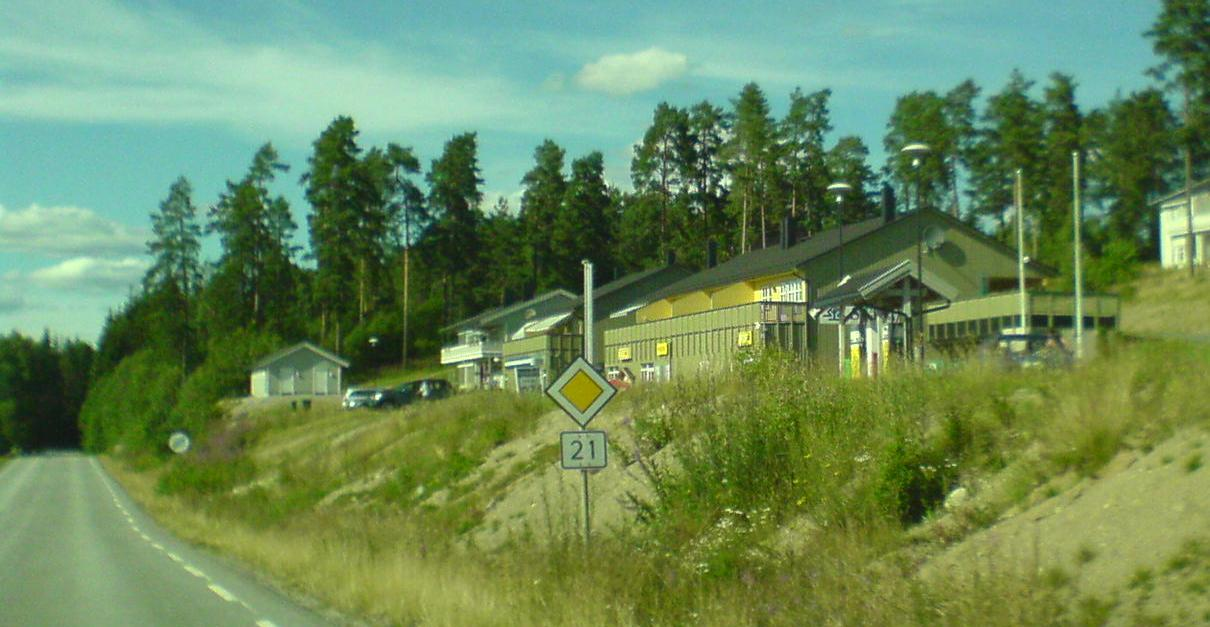
- Setskog Senter

- Location in Akershus Setskog (Norway)
- Coordinates: 59°50′N 11°43′E
- Country: Norway
- Region: Østlandet
- County: Akershus
- Municipality: Aurskog-Høland
- Time zone: UTC+01:00 (CET)
  - Summer (DST): UTC+02:00 (CEST)
- Post Code: 1954

Setskog is a village and a former municipality in Akershus county, Norway. It bordered Østfold county to the south, Innlandet county to the north and Sweden to the east.

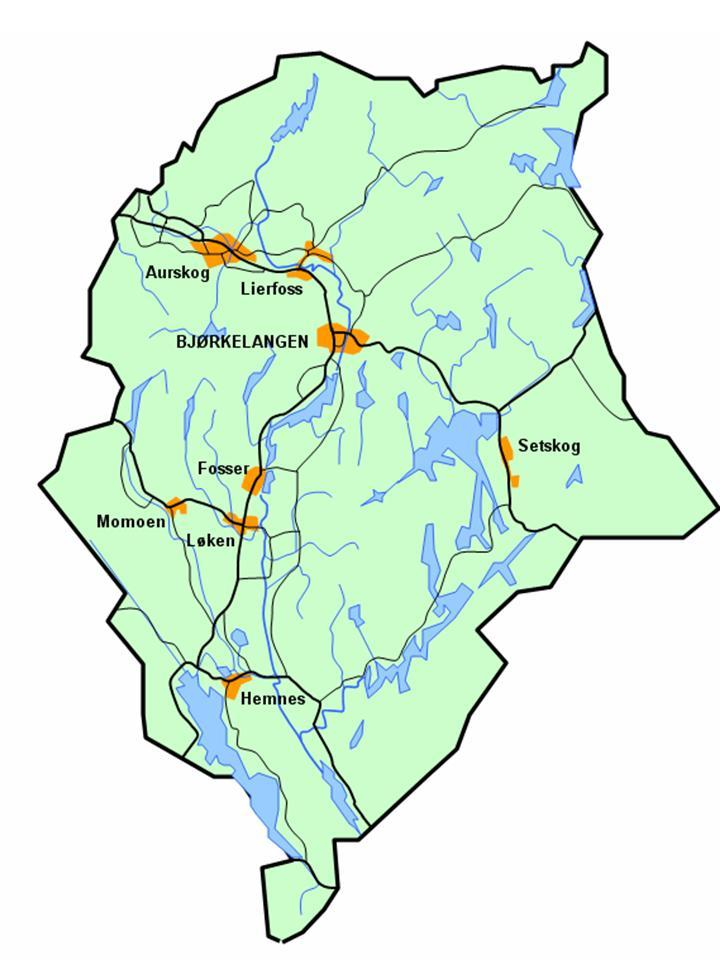
Setskog within Aurskog Høland municipality

== History ==
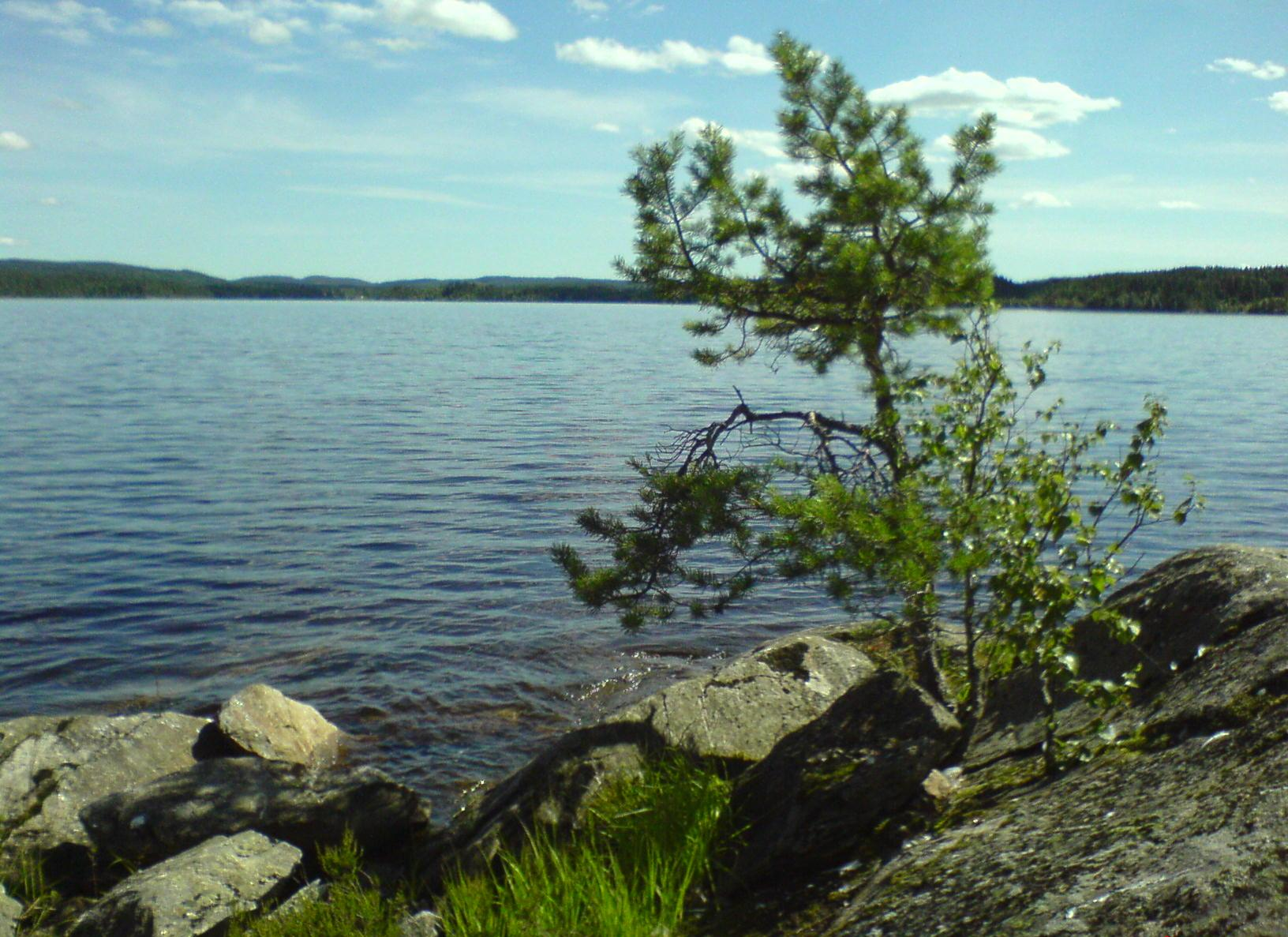
The Lake Setten

Setskog was created by a split from Høland Municipality on 1 January 1905. At that time Setskog had a population of 754. On 1 January 1966 Setskog merged with Nordre Høland, Søndre Høland and Aurskog to form the new municipality Aurskog-Høland Municipality. Prior to the merger Setskog had a population of 811.

Setskog is an old district name. The first element is the name of the lake Setten, the last element is skog meaning 'forest, woodland'. The meaning of the name Setten is unknown.

The Soot Canal, a timber transportation system constructed by Engebret Soot(1786-1859), went through Setskog from 1849 to 1938. It went from the lake Mortsjølungen on the border to Eidskog Municipality until the timber was transported on the Grasmobanen railroad, then through several lakes and a long narrow timbercanal, finally ending into the lake Setten where the timber was transported further south all the way to Halden. Parts of the canalsystems, are now protected due to its historical value. An annual march, Sootkanalmarsjen, is held every summer, where hikers follow the entire length of the canal.

== Goliat ==
Setskog was once home to Norway's largest tree, a ca 250-year-old spruce. Some say the tree dated back to 1750 and it reached 47 meters in the air until wind broke the top reducing the height to 41.75 meters. Vandals cut the tree with a chainsaw in 2005, which left the tree badly damaged and eventually resulted in the tree dying and declining at a fast rate. In 2010, the municipality decided to cut the dead tree down, but the remains will serve as part of a tribute on the local soccer field.
