= Aurskog =

Former municipality in Akershus, Norway

Coordinates: 59°55′36.35″N 11°28′5.14″E

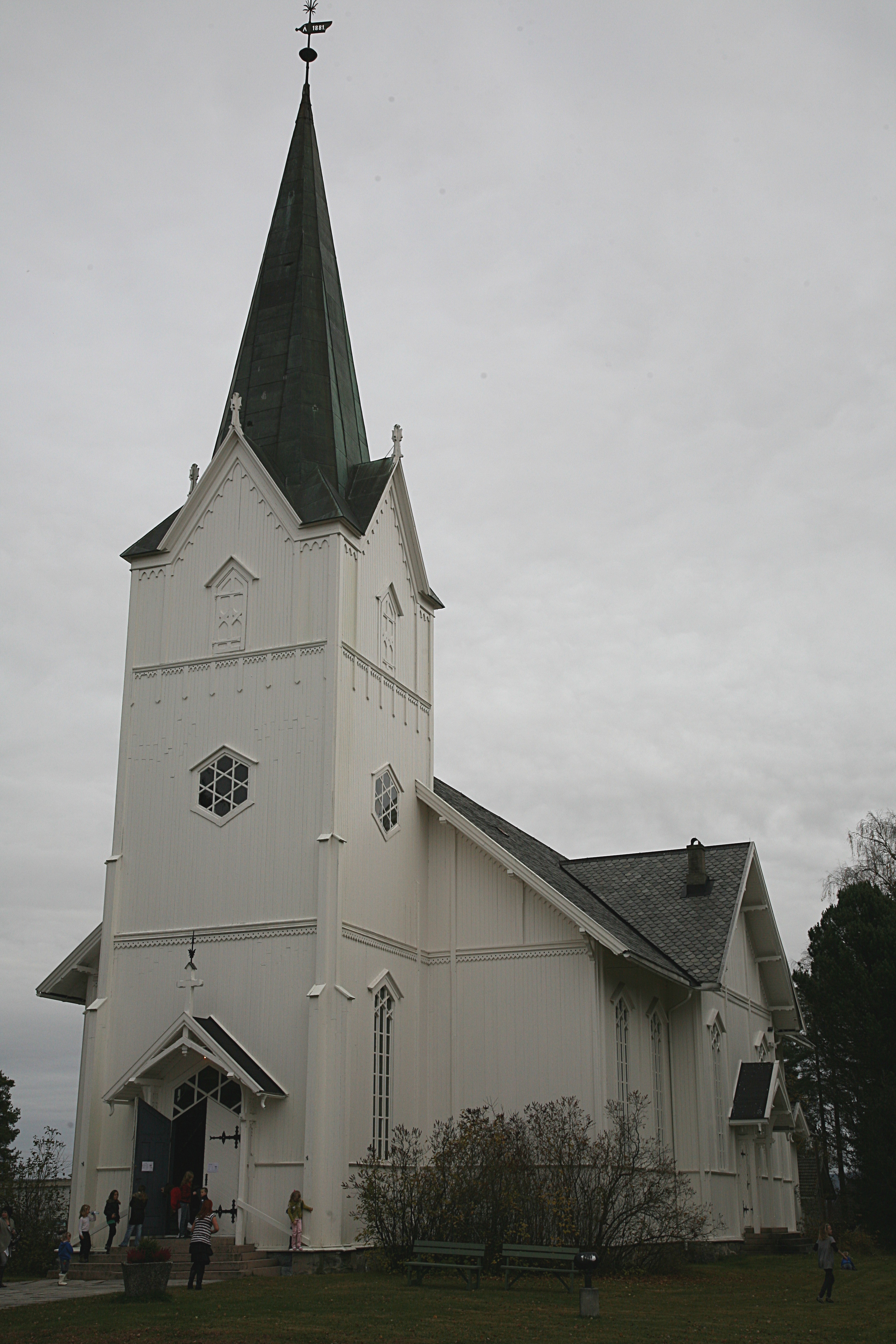
Aurskog Church in Aurskog-Høland

Aurskog is a former municipality in Akershus county, Norway. The administrative centre was Aursmoen.

Aurskog was the location of the Battle of Toverud. The parish of Urskog was established as a municipality January 1, 1838 (see formannskapsdistrikt). On 1 July 1919 the district of Blaker was separated to form a municipality of its own. The split left Aurskog with a population of 3.102.

On 1 January 1966 Aurskog was merged with Nordre Høland, Søndre Høland and Setskog to form the new municipality Aurskog-Høland. Prior to the merger Aurskog had a population of 3.129.

== The name ==
The municipality (originally the parish) is named after the old farm Ør (Norse Aurr 'gravel'), since the first church was built here. The last element is skog (Norse skógr) 'woods' - and the meaning of the full name is 'the woods around the farm Aurr'. Until 1918 the name was written "Urskog".

== Bird Hunt of 1938 ==
On the eve of World War II a sudden explosion in the population of Black Throated Divers caused the Trout population to decrease significantly. As a result the municipality deemed the birds "destructive to the regional stability" and initiated a hunt that restored the trout population. In 1939 the town sold a large portion of the excess of the meat to neighboring Oslo. It is thought that this is possibly the reason for Aurskog's colloquial name in the region as "fugleherren" or in English "The Bird Master".
