= Aurskog-Høland =

Aurskog-Høland Municipality Aurskog-Høland kommune
- Municipality
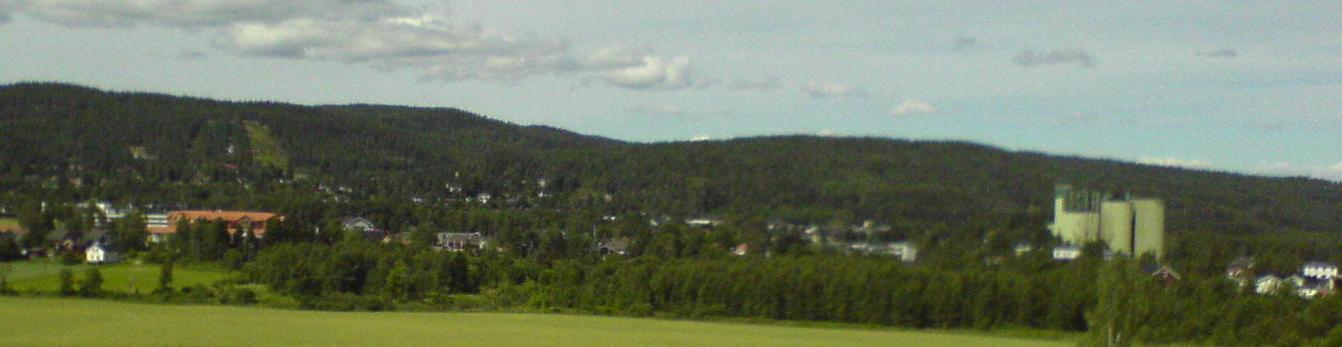

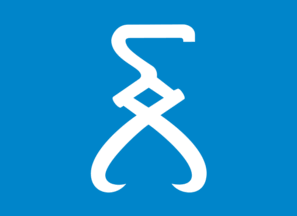
- Flag Coat of arms

- Akershus within Norway

- Aurskog-Høland within Akershus
- Coordinates: 59°50′24″N 11°34′6″E
- Country: Norway
- County: Akershus
- District: Romerike
- Administrative centre: Bjørkelangen

Government
  - Mayor (2019): Gudbrand Kvaal (Sp)

Area
  - Total: 962 km^{2} (371 sq mi)
  - Land: 894 km^{2} (345 sq mi)
  - Rank: #111 in Norway

Population (2004)
  - Total: 13,199
  - Rank: #79 in Norway
  - Density: 15/km^{2} (39/sq mi)
  - Change (10 years): ▲ +7.3%
- Demonym(s): Aurskoging/Urskæving; Hølending

Official language
  - Norwegian form: Bokmål
- Time zone: UTC+01:00 (CET)
  - Summer (DST): UTC+02:00 (CEST)
- ISO 3166 code: NO-3226
- Website: Official website

Aurskog-Høland is a municipality in Akershus county, Norway. It is part of the Romerike traditional region. The administrative centre of the municipality is the village of Bjørkelangen. The municipality of Rømskog, in Østfold county was merged into Aurskog-Høland on 1 January 2020.

== General information ==
=== Name ===
The new municipality of Aurskog-Høland was created on 1 January 1966 after the merger of the four old municipalities of Aurskog, Nordre Høland, Søndre Høland, and Setskog.

The name Aurskog comes from the old Ør farm (Old Norse: Aurr which means "gravel"). The last element is skog (Old Norse: skógr which means "wood" therefore the meaning of the full name is "the woods around the farm Aurr". Prior to 1918, the name was written "Urskog".

The name Høland is an old district name. The first element is høy which means "hay" and the last element is land which means "land".

=== Coat-of-arms ===
The coat-of-arms is from modern times. They were granted on 4 February 1983. The arms show a black European crayfish (Astacus astacus) on a gold background. It was derived from an older logo of the municipality. The logo showed a typical landscape of the area, a lake surrounded by woods and a crayfish in the lake. To place the whole composition in a shield to create the arms was not allowed according to Norwegian heraldic rules, so the crayfish was chosen as a symbol.

== Demographics ==
Number of minorities (1st and 2nd generation) in Aurskog-Høland by country of origin in 2021
Country background	Number
Poland	736
Lithuania	259
Sweden	148
Germany	107
Syria	107
Thailand	91
Eritrea	88
Philippines	86
Romania	82
Pakistan	79
Denmark	64
Russia	55
Netherlands	54

== Geography ==
It is the biggest municipality in Akershus, covering 967 square kilometres (373.4 mi^{2}). The main villages are Aurskog and Bjørkelangen, of which the latter is the administrative center. Forests cover much of the area, but there is very good farmland as well. The rivers of Haldenvassdraget and Hølandselva run through the district.

== Economy ==
An important printing office, PDC Tangen AS and a crushing mill are situated here. Oslo is less than one hour's drive to the west.

The Think electric car was manufactured in Aurskog.

== Notable people ==
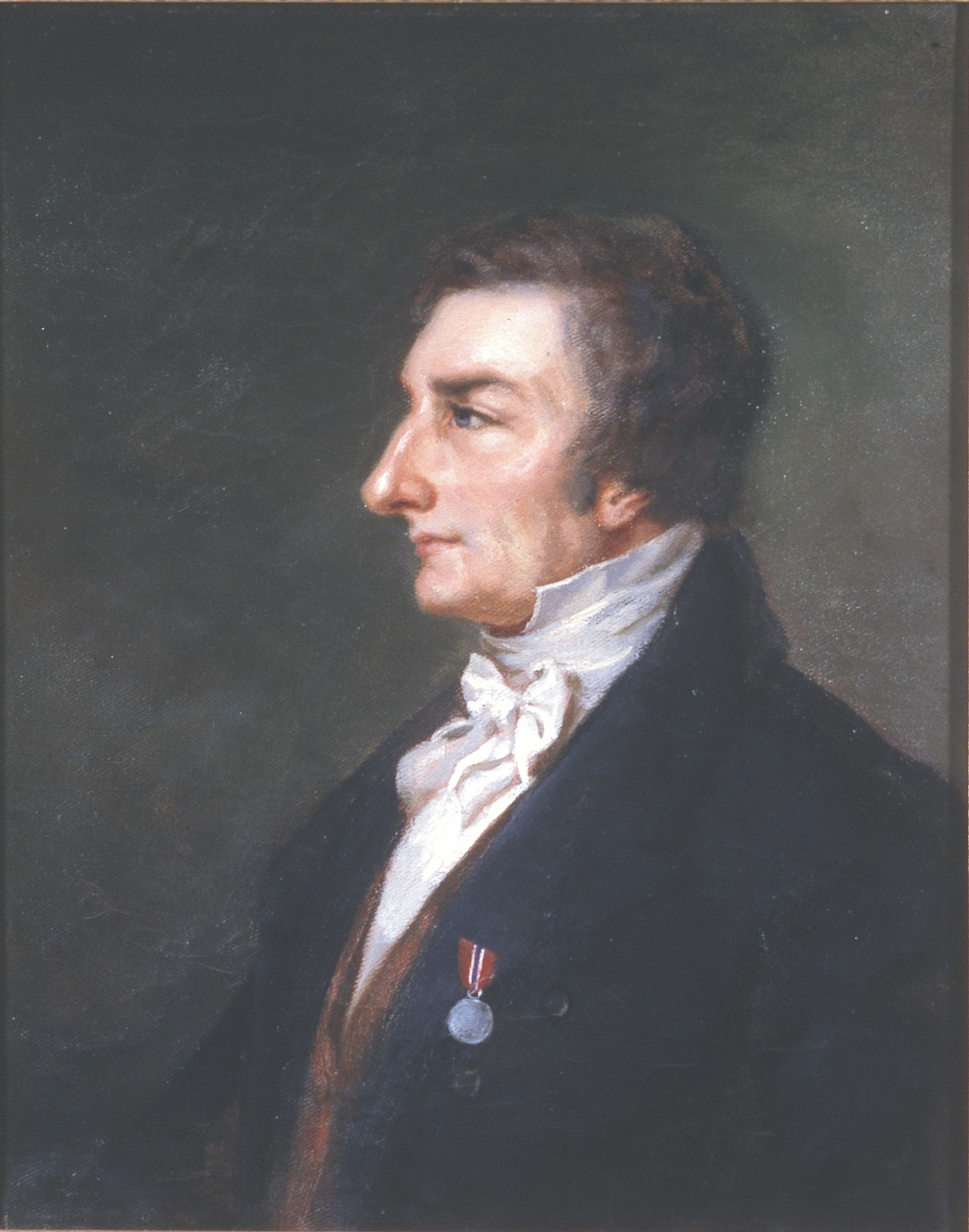
Christian Christensen Kollerud, 1814

- Christian Christensen Kollerud (1767–1833) a farmer, rep. on Norwegian Constitutional Assembly
- Engebret Soot (1786–1859) was a Norwegian engineer and canal builder
- Johan Vaaler (1866–1910) was a Norwegian inventor and patent clerk
- Anders Heyerdahl (1832–1918) was a Norwegian violinist, composer and folk music collector
- Betzy Akersloot-Berg (1850–1922) a seascape and landscape painter, lived in Vlieland
- Gunnar Nordbye (1888–1977) was a United States district judge in Minnesota.
- Anette Tønsberg (born 1970) a speed skater, competed at the 1992 and 1998 Winter Olympics
- Lasse Ottesen (born 1974) was a former ski jumper, silver medallist at the 1994 Winter Olympics
- Charlotte Frogner (born 1981) is a Norwegian actress
- Dennis Hauger (born 2003) is a Norwegian racing driver in the IndyCar Series

== Sister cities ==
The following cities are twinned with Aurskog-Høland:

- - Frederikssund, Region Hovedstaden, Denmark
- - Kumla, Örebro County, Sweden
- - Sipoo, Etelä-Suomi, Finland

== See also ==
- Urskog–Høland Line
