= Singsås (disambiguation) =

Singsås may refer to:

== Places ==
- Singsås, a village in Midtre Gauldal Municipality in Trøndelag county, Norway
- Singsås Municipality, a former municipality in the old Sør-Trøndelag county, Norway
- Singsås Church, a church in Midtre Gauldal Municipality in Trøndelag county, Norway

== Other ==
- Singsås IL, a sports club from Midtre Gauldal Municipality in Trøndelag county, Norway
- Singsås Station, a railway station in Midtre Gauldal Municipality in Trøndelag county, Norway
