= Rognes, Norway =

Village in Midtre Gauldal Municipality, Norway

Rognes
- Village
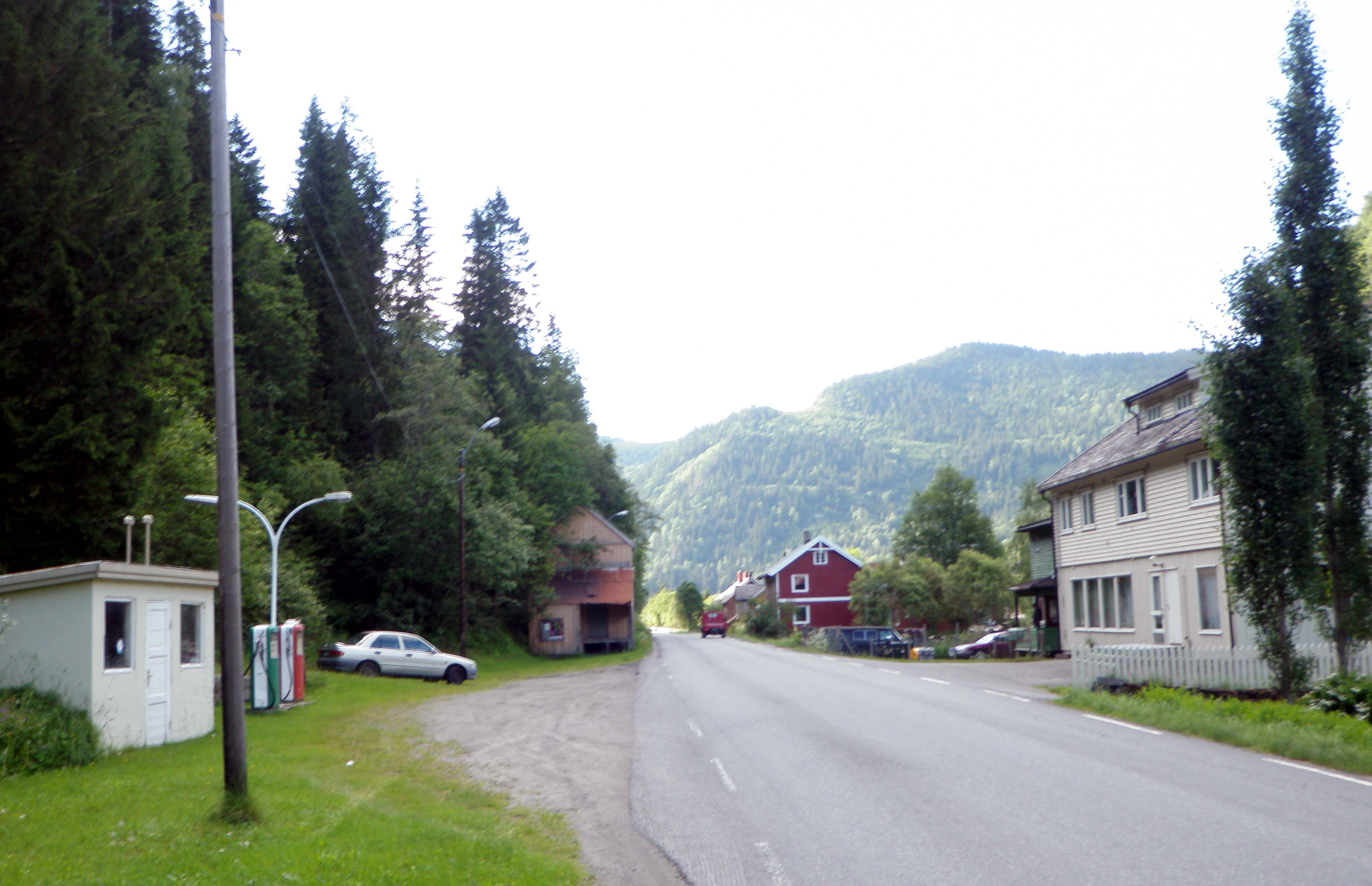
- View of the village
- Interactive map of Rognes
- Location within Trøndelag Location within Norway
- Coordinates: 63.0071°N 10.4526°E
- Country: Norway
- Region: Central Norway
- County: Trøndelag
- District: Gauldalen
- Municipality: Midtre Gauldal Municipality
- Elevation: 106 m (348 ft)
- Time zone: UTC+01:00 (CET)
  - Summer (DST): UTC+02:00 (CEST)
- Post Code: 7295 Rognes

Rognes is a village in Midtre Gauldal Municipality in Trøndelag county, Norway. It is located along the river Gaula, about 10 kilometres (6.2 mi) east of the village of Støren and about 15 kilometres (9.3 mi) northwest of the village of Singsås. The Rørosbanen railway line runs through the village. The village economy is largely based on agriculture with salmon fishing also being important.
