= Singsås Municipality =

Former municipality in Norway

Singsås Municipality Singsås herred
- Former municipality
- Singsaas herred (historic name)
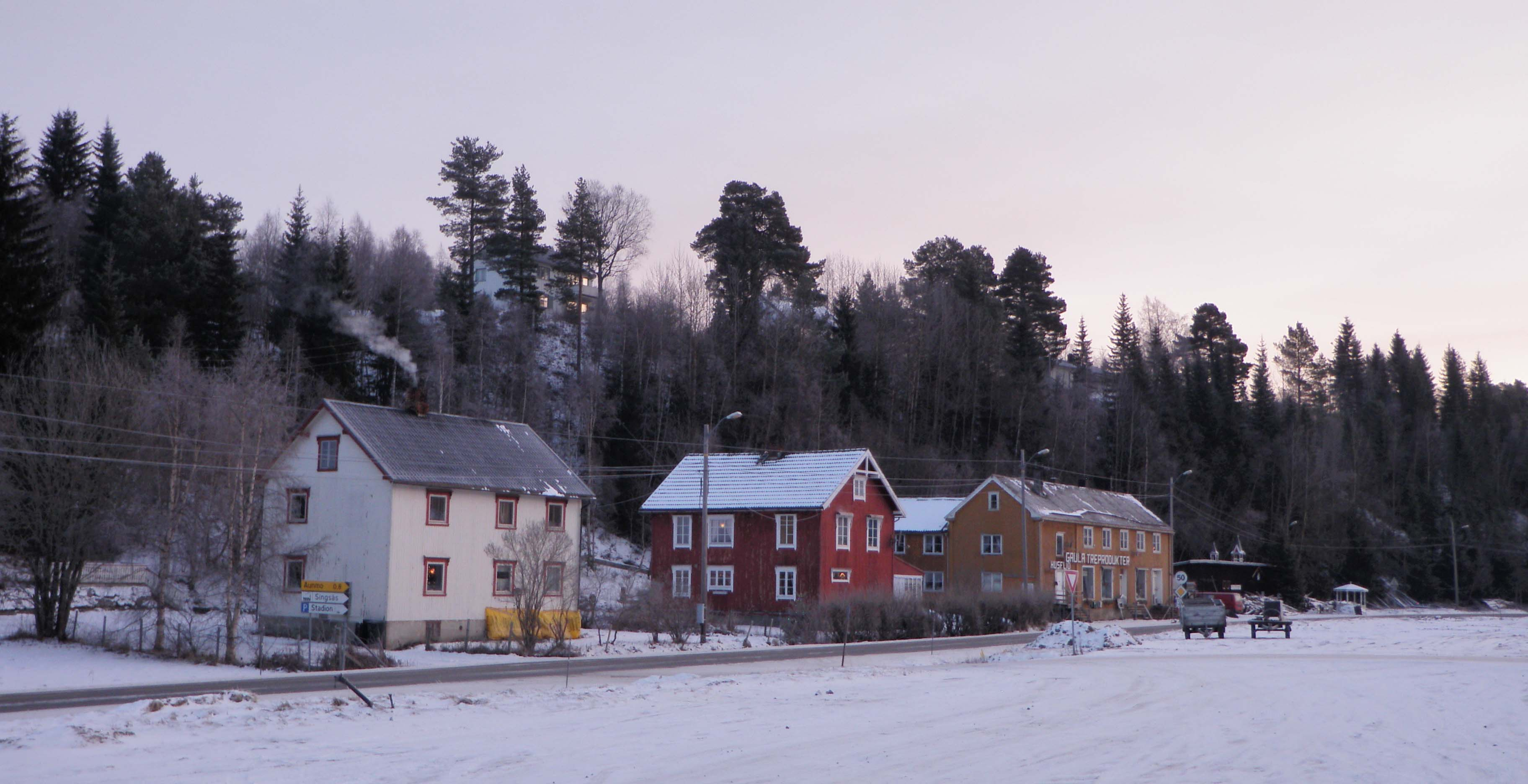
- View of the village of Singsås

- Sør-Trøndelag within Norway

- Singsås within Sør-Trøndelag
- Coordinates: 62.9562°N 10.7308°E
- Country: Norway
- County: Sør-Trøndelag
- District: Gauldalen
- Established: 1841
  - Preceded by: Holtaalen Municipality
- Disestablished: 1 Jan 1964
  - Succeeded by: Midtre Gauldal Municipality
- Administrative centre: Singsås

Government
  - Mayor (1960–1963): Ivar Grytdal (Sp)

Area (upon dissolution)
  - Total: 765.3 km^{2} (295.5 sq mi)
  - Rank: #121 in Norway
- Highest elevation: 1,332 m (4,370 ft)

Population (1963)
  - Total: 1,598
  - Rank: #522 in Norway
  - Density: 2.1/km^{2} (5.4/sq mi)
  - Change (10 years): ▼ −7.8%
- Demonym: Singsåsbygg

Official language
  - Norwegian form: Neutral
- Time zone: UTC+01:00 (CET)
  - Summer (DST): UTC+02:00 (CEST)
- ISO 3166 code: NO-1646

Singsås is a former municipality in the old Sør-Trøndelag county, Norway. The 765-square-kilometre (295 sq mi) municipality existed from 1841 until its dissolution in 1964. Singsås Municipality encompassed the eastern part of what is now Midtre Gauldal Municipality in Trøndelag county. The administrative center was the village of Singsås, where the Singsås Church is located.

Prior to its dissolution in 1964, the 765.3-square-kilometre (295.5 sq mi) municipality was the 121st largest by area out of the 689 municipalities in Norway. Singsås Municipality was the 522nd most populous municipality in Norway with a population of about 1,598. The municipality's population density was 2.1 inhabitants per square kilometre (5.4/sq mi) and its population had decreased by 7.8% over the previous 10-year period.

== General information ==
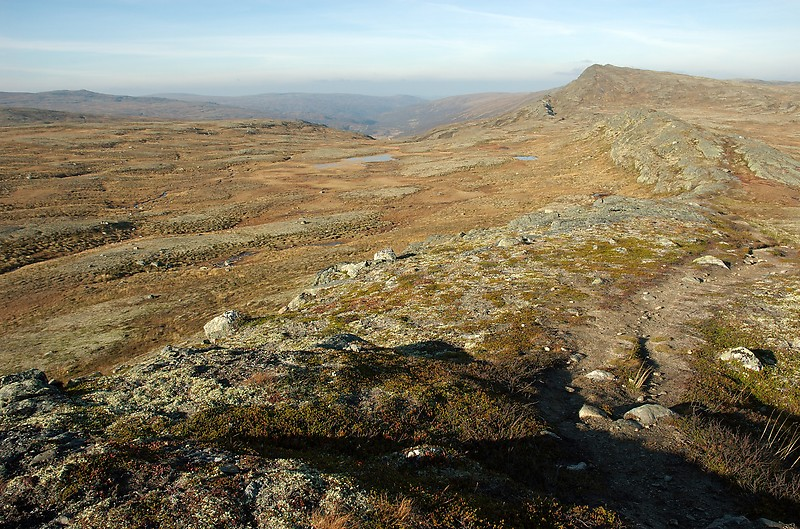
Looking north from Forollhogna

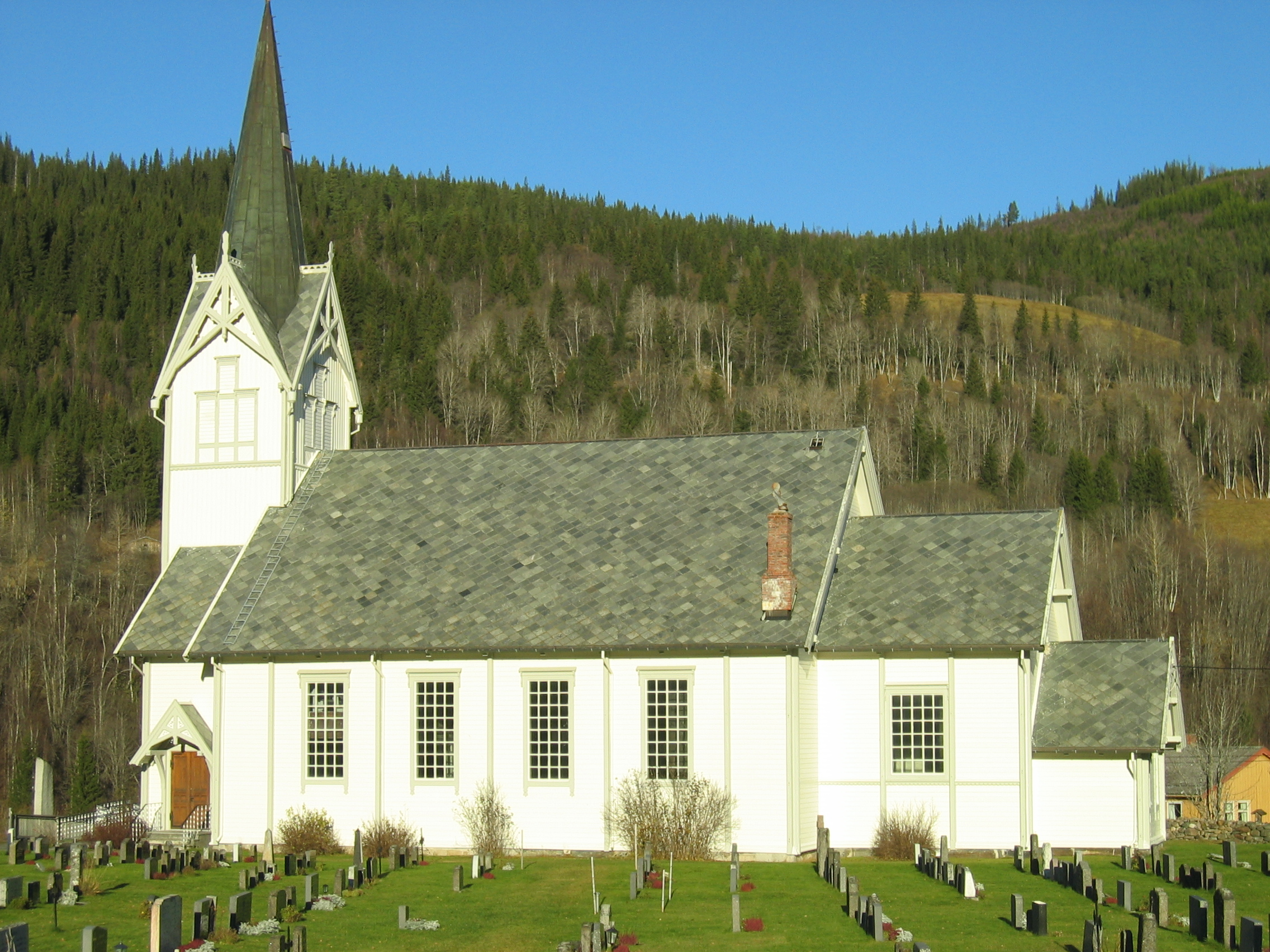
View of the Singsås Church

In 1841, the western district (population: 1,272) of the old Holtaalen Municipality was split off to form a separate municipality called Singsaas Municipality (under the recently passed formannskapsdistrikt law). On 1 January 1875, an unpopulated area of Singsås Municipality made up of rural farmland and mountains was transferred to the neighboring Budal Municipality.

During the 1960s, there were many municipal mergers across Norway due to the work of the Schei Committee. On 1 January 1964, a municipal merger took place: Budal Municipality (population: 529), Singsås Municipality (population: 1,554), Soknedal Municipality (population: 1,916), and Støren Municipality (population: 2,296) were all merged to form the new Midtre Gauldal Municipality.

=== Name ===
The municipality (originally the parish) is named after the old Singsås farm (Old Norse: Singillsaas) since the first Singsås Church was built there. The first element is a male name Singull or Singulfr. The last element is possibly áss which means "hill" or "ridge". On 21 December 1917, a royal resolution enacted the 1917 Norwegian language reforms. Prior to this change, the name was spelled Singsaas with the digraph "aa", and after this reform, the name was spelled Singsås, using the letter å instead.

=== Churches ===
The Church of Norway had one parish (sokn) within Singsås Municipality. At the time of the municipal dissolution, it was part of the Haltdalen prestegjeld and the Gauldal prosti (deanery) in the Diocese of Nidaros.

Churches in Singsås Municipality
Parish (sokn)	Church name	Location of the church	Year built
Singsås	Singsås Church	Singsås	1884

== Geography ==
The municipality was located in the Gauldalen valley. Haltdalen Municipality was to the east, Selbu Municipality was to the northeast, Støren Municipality was to the northwest, Budal Municipality was to the southwest, and a small part of Tolga Municipality (in Hedmark county) was to the south. The highest point in the municipality was the 1,332-metre (4,370 ft) tall mountain Forollhogna, on the border with neighboring Haltdalen Municipality.

== Government ==
While it existed, Singsås Municipality was responsible for primary education (through 10th grade), outpatient health services, senior citizen services, welfare and other social services, zoning, economic development, and municipal roads and utilities. The municipality was governed by a municipal council of directly elected representatives. The mayor was indirectly elected by a vote of the municipal council. The municipality was under the jurisdiction of the Frostating Court of Appeal.

=== Municipal council ===
The municipal council (Herredsstyre) of Singsås Municipality was made up of 17 representatives that were elected to four year terms. The tables below show the historical composition of the council by political party.

Singsås herredsstyre 1959–1963
Party name (in Norwegian)	Number of representatives
Labour Party (Arbeiderpartiet)	8
Christian Democratic Party (Kristelig Folkeparti)	2
Centre Party (Senterpartiet)	5
Liberal Party (Venstre)	2
Total number of members:	17

Singsås herredsstyre 1955–1959
Party name (in Norwegian)	Number of representatives
Labour Party (Arbeiderpartiet)	8
Joint List(s) of Non-Socialist Parties (Borgerlige Felleslister)	9
Total number of members:	17

Singsås herredsstyre 1951–1955
Party name (in Norwegian)	Number of representatives
Labour Party (Arbeiderpartiet)	8
Joint List(s) of Non-Socialist Parties (Borgerlige Felleslister)	8
Total number of members:	16

Singsås herredsstyre 1947–1951
Party name (in Norwegian)	Number of representatives
Labour Party (Arbeiderpartiet)	8
Joint List(s) of Non-Socialist Parties (Borgerlige Felleslister)	8
Total number of members:	16

Singsås herredsstyre 1945–1947
Party name (in Norwegian)	Number of representatives
Labour Party (Arbeiderpartiet)	8
Joint List(s) of Non-Socialist Parties (Borgerlige Felleslister)	8
Total number of members:	16

Singsås herredsstyre 1937–1941*
Party name (in Norwegian)	Number of representatives
Labour Party (Arbeiderpartiet)	8
Joint List(s) of Non-Socialist Parties (Borgerlige Felleslister)	8
Total number of members:	16
Note: Due to the German occupation of Norway during World War II, no elections were held for new municipal councils until after the war ended in 1945.

=== Mayors ===
The mayor (Norwegian: ordfører) of Singsås Municipality was the political leader of the municipality and the chairperson of the municipal council. Here is a list of people who held this position:

- 1841–1841: Peder Olsen Reppe
- 1842–1845: Peder Thomassen Talsnes
- 1846–1849: Esten Andersen Hovstad
- 1850–1851: Hans Jacobsen Winsnes
- 1852–1855: Ole Pedersen Kjelden
- 1856–1859: Peder Pedersen Winsnes
- 1860–1861: Hans Jacobsen Winsnes
- 1862–1865: Peder Pedersen Winsnes
- 1866–1867: Peder Tønder Monsen
- 1868–1879: Peder Pedersen Winsnes
- 1880–1898: Hans Olsen Mahlum (H)
- 1899–1901: Tomas Jensen Bogen (V)
- 1902–1904: Peder Pedersen Reppe (V)
- 1905–1916: Ingebrigt Ingebrigtsen Huus (V)
- 1917–1919: Tomas Jensen Bogen (V)
- 1920–1922: Ole Olsen Koth (Ap)
- 1923–1928: Ole Hansen Malum (H)
- 1929–1934: Hans Pedersen Winsnes (Bp)
- 1935–1937: Ingebrigt Ingebrigtsen Huus (Bp)
- 1938–1941: Hans P. Foros (Ap)
- 1941–1943: Arnt P. Hinsværk
- 1943–1945: Johan P. Kristiansen
- 1945–1947: Hans P. Foros (Ap)
- 1948–1959: Arnt P. Hinsværk (Bp)
- 1960–1963: Ivar Grytdal (Sp)

== See also ==
- List of former municipalities of Norway
