= Samsjøen (Trøndelag) =

Lake in Trøndelag, Norway

- Interactive map of the lake
- Location: Trøndelag, Norway
- Coordinates: 63.0960°N 10.6689°E
- Basin countries: Norway
- Max. length: 6.6 kilometres (4.1 mi)
- Max. width: 2.3 kilometres (1.4 mi)
- Surface area: 10 km^{2} (3.9 sq mi)
- Shore length^{1}: 22.82 kilometres (14.18 mi)
- Surface elevation: 487 metres (1,598 ft)
- References: NVE
- ^{1} Shore length is not a well-defined measure.

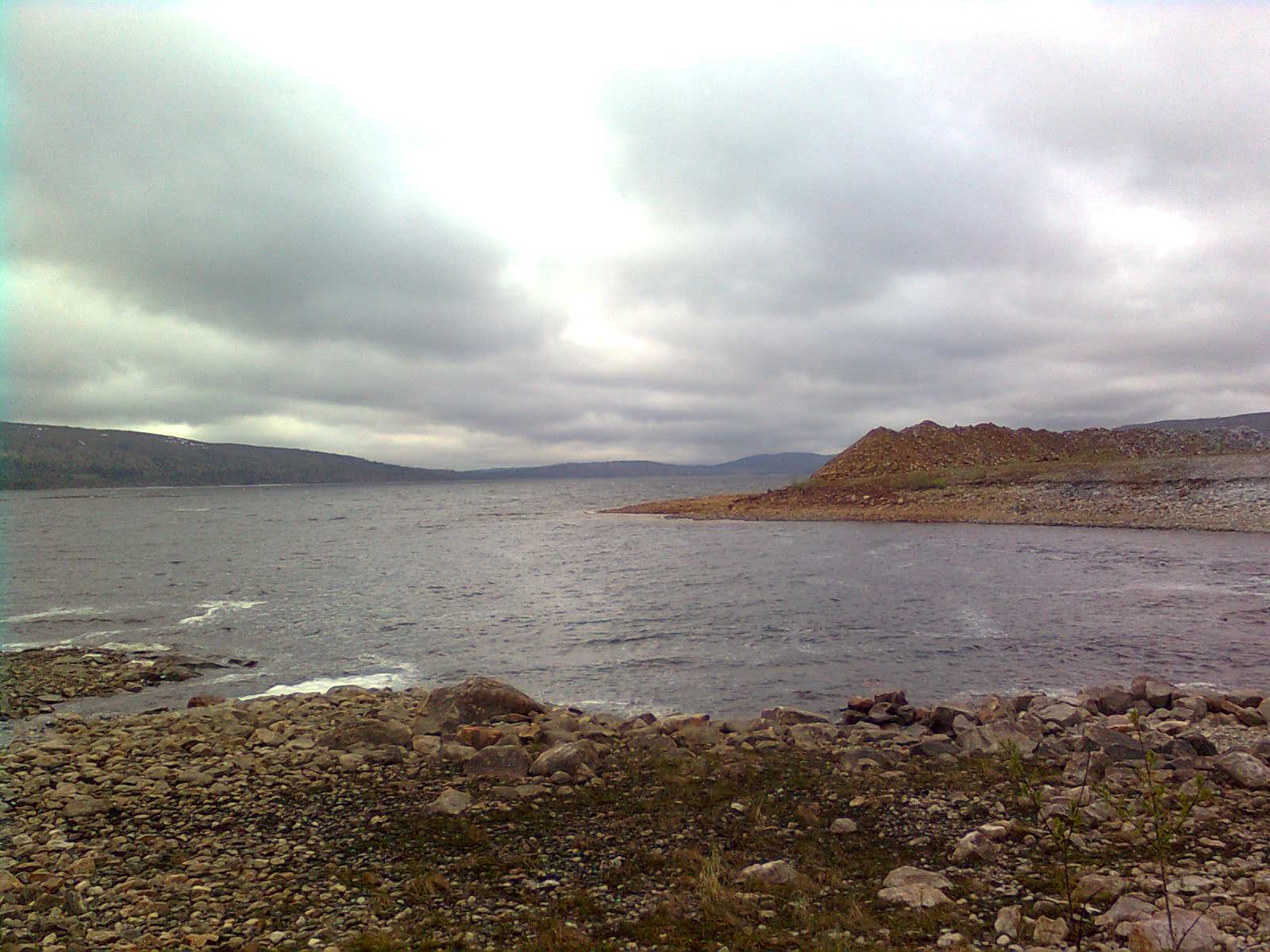
View of Samsjøen.

Samsjøen is a lake in Trøndelag county, Norway. The 10-square-kilometre (3.9 sq mi) lake sits on the border of Midtre Gauldal Municipality and Melhus Municipality. Most of the lake lies in Midtre Gauldal Municipality, about 12 kilometres (7.5 mi) north of the village of Singsås. The lake has a dam at the northwest end, which is used for hydroelectric power production. The water flows out of the lake and into the Lundesokna river which flows into the river Gaula.

== See also ==
- List of lakes in Norway
