= Budal Municipality =

Former municipality in Trøndelag, Norway

Budal Municipality Budal herred
- Former municipality
- Budalen herred (historic name)
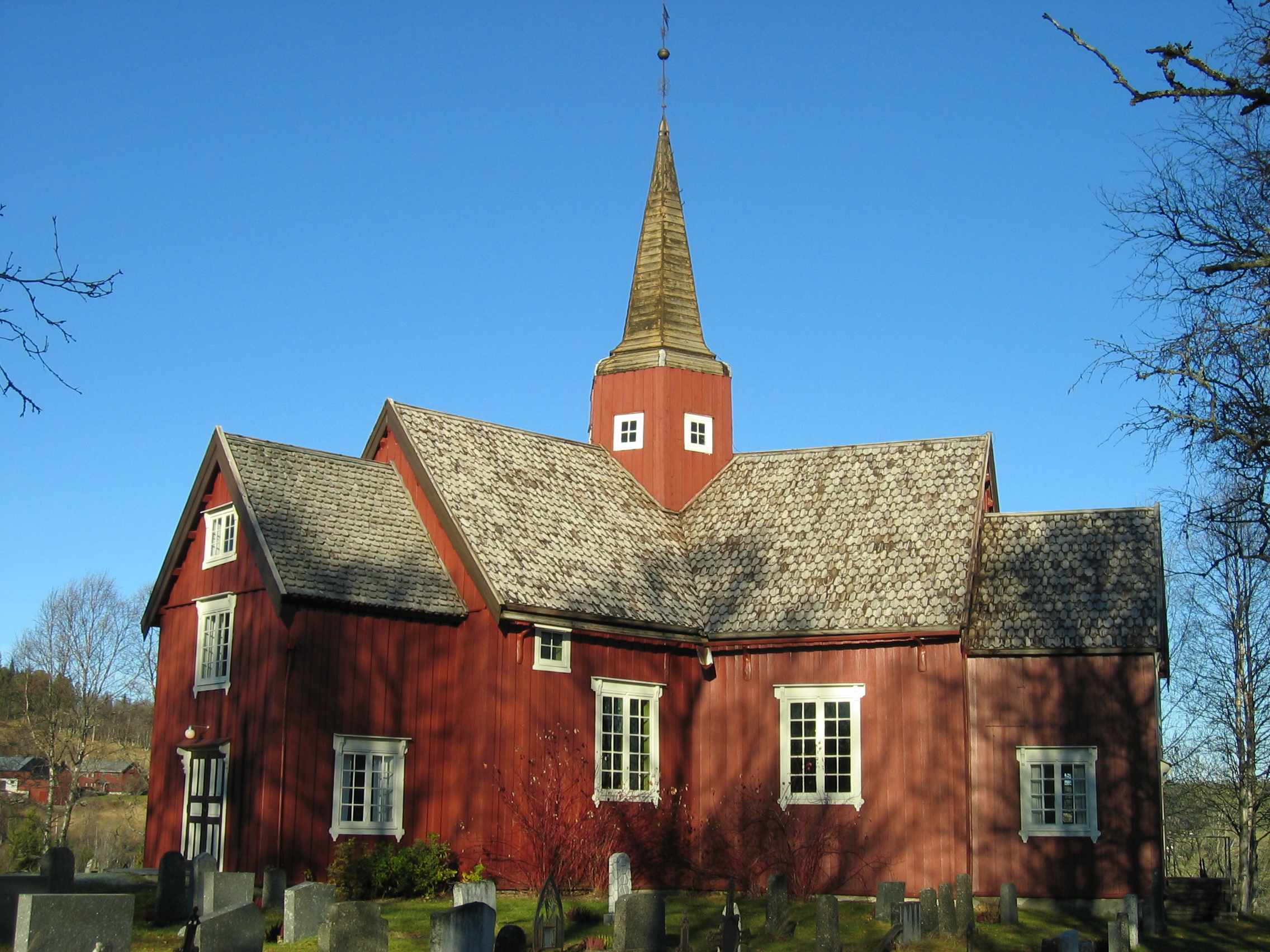
- View of the local church

- Sør-Trøndelag within Norway

- Budal within Sør-Trøndelag
- Coordinates: 62°53′06″N 10°29′01″E
- Country: Norway
- County: Sør-Trøndelag
- District: Gauldalen
- Established: 1879
  - Preceded by: Støren Municipality
- Disestablished: 1 Jan 1964
  - Succeeded by: Midtre Gauldal Municipality
- Administrative centre: Enodden

Government
  - Mayor (1960–1963): Jacob Hindbjørgen (Ap)

Area (upon dissolution)
  - Total: 334.8 km^{2} (129.3 sq mi)
  - Rank: #260 in Norway
- Highest elevation: 1,235 m (4,052 ft)

Population (1963)
  - Total: 545
  - Rank: #674 in Norway
  - Density: 1.6/km^{2} (4.1/sq mi)
  - Change (10 years): ▼ −7%
- Demonym(s): Budaling; Budøl

Official language
  - Norwegian form: Neutral
- Time zone: UTC+01:00 (CET)
  - Summer (DST): UTC+02:00 (CEST)
- ISO 3166 code: NO-1647

Budal is a former municipality in the old Sør-Trøndelag county, Norway. The 335-square-kilometre (129 sq mi) municipality existed from 1879 until its dissolution in 1964. It encompassed the Bua and Ena river valleys in the south-central part of the what is now Midtre Gauldal Municipality in Trøndelag county. The administrative center of Budal was the village of Enodden where Budal Church is located.

Prior to its dissolution in 1964, the 334.8-square-kilometre (129.3 sq mi) municipality was the 260th largest by area out of the 689 municipalities in Norway. Budal Municipality was the 674th most populous municipality in Norway with a population of about 545. The municipality's population density was 1.6 inhabitants per square kilometre (4.1/sq mi) and its population had decreased by 7% over the previous 10-year period.

== General information ==
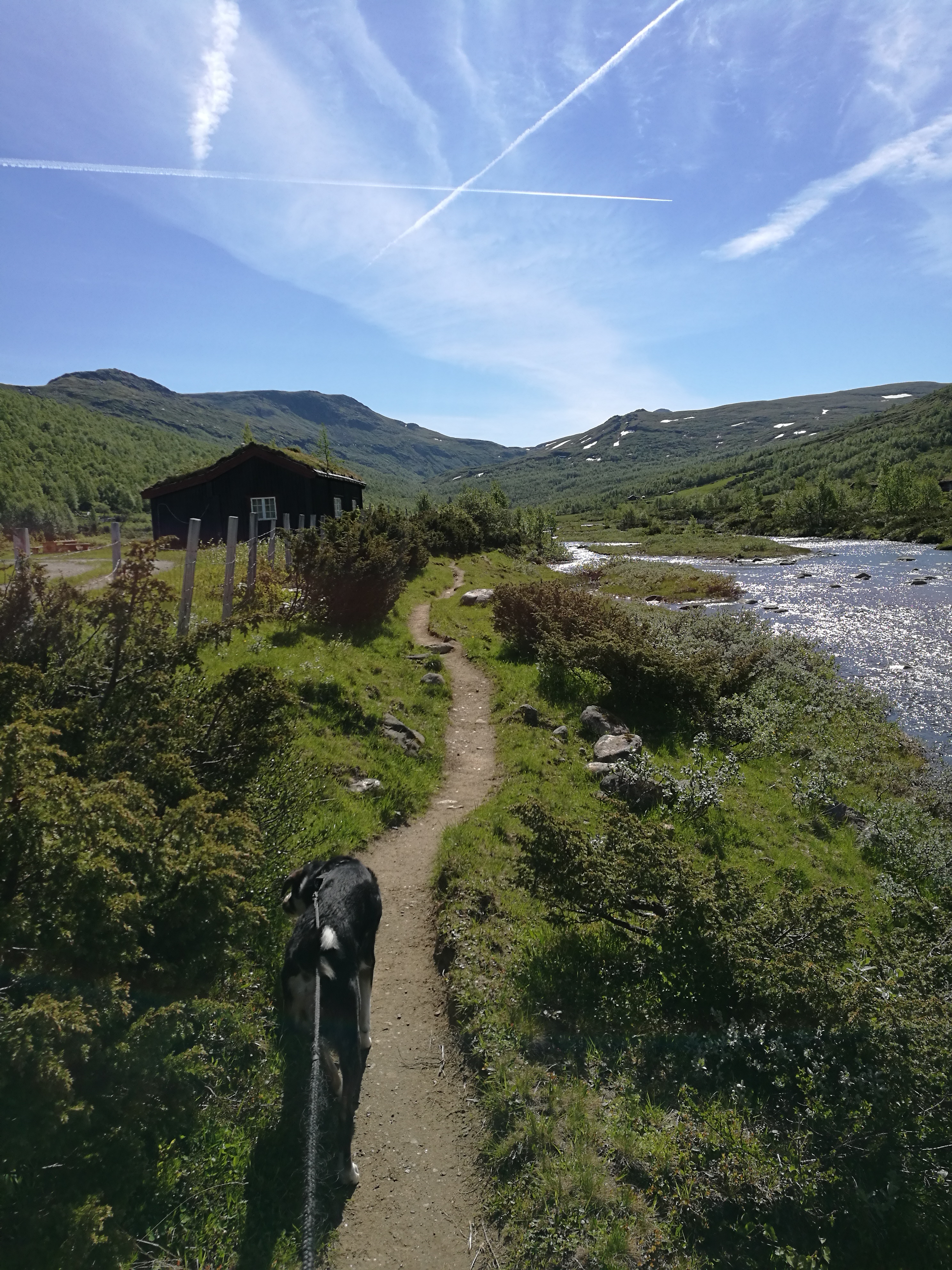
Synnerdalen valley and the river Bua

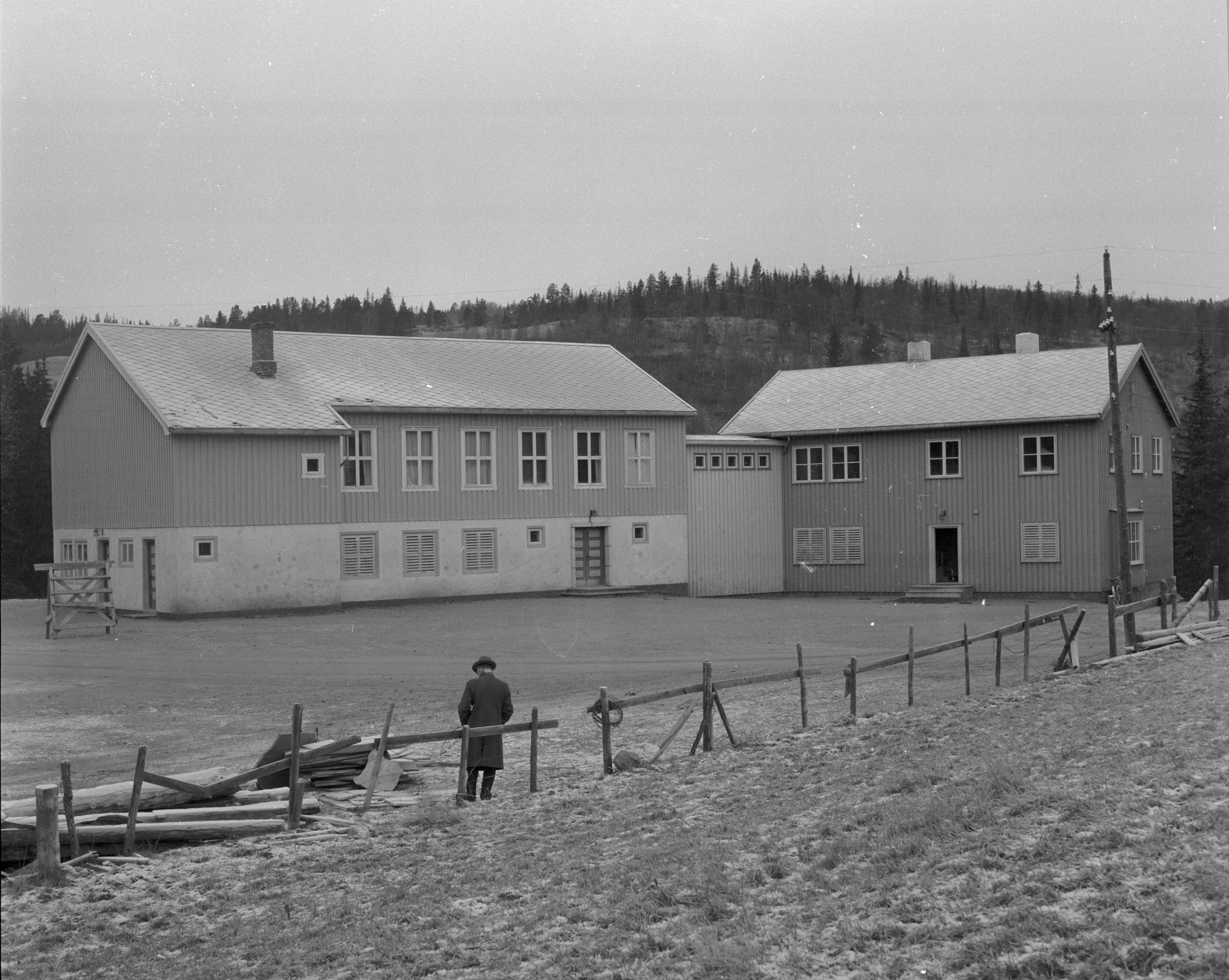
Farm buildings in Budal c. 1961

The parish of Budal was established as a municipality in 1879 when it was separated from the large Støren Municipality. Initially, Budal Municipality had a population of 585.

During the 1960s, there were many municipal mergers across Norway due to the work of the Schei Committee. On 1 January 1964, a large municipal merger took place. Budal Municipality (population: 529) was merged with Singsås Municipality (population: 1,554), Soknedal Municipality (population: 1,916), and Støren Municipality (population: 2,296) to form the new Midtre Gauldal Municipality.

=== Name ===
The municipality (originally the parish) is named after the old Budalen farm (Old Norse: Buadalr) since the first Budal Church was built there. The first element is the name of the local river Bua. That name is the same as the word bua which refers to a "place where people live". The last element is dalr which means "valley" or "dale". Historically, the name of the municipality was spelled Budalen. On 3 November 1917, a royal resolution changed the spelling of the name of the municipality to Budal, removing the definite form ending -en.

=== Churches ===
The Church of Norway had one parish (sokn) within Budal Municipality. At the time of the municipal dissolution, it was part of the Støren prestegjeld and the Gauldal prosti (deanery) in the Diocese of Nidaros.

Churches in Budal Municipality
Parish (sokn)	Church name	Location of the church	Year built
Budal	Budal Church	Enodden	1754

== Geography ==
The municipality was located in the Gauldalen valley. Kvikne Municipality (in Hedmark county) was to the south, Singsås Municipality was to the east, Støren Municipality was to the north, and Soknedal Municipality was to the west. The highest point in the municipality was the 1,235-metre (4,052 ft) tall mountain Stiftsvardhøgda.

== Government ==
While it existed, Budal Municipality was responsible for primary education (through 10th grade), outpatient health services, senior citizen services, welfare and other social services, zoning, economic development, and municipal roads and utilities. The municipality was governed by a municipal council of directly elected representatives. The mayor was indirectly elected by a vote of the municipal council. The municipality was under the jurisdiction of the Frostating Court of Appeal.

=== Municipal council ===
The municipal council (Herredsstyre) of Budal Municipality was made up of 13 representatives that were elected to four year terms. The tables below show the historical composition of the council by political party.

Budal herredsstyre 1959–1963
Party name (in Norwegian)	Number of representatives
Labour Party (Arbeiderpartiet)	7
Communist Party (Kommunistiske Parti)	1
Joint List(s) of Non-Socialist Parties (Borgerlige Felleslister)	5
Total number of members:	13

Budal herredsstyre 1955–1959
Party name (in Norwegian)	Number of representatives
Labour Party (Arbeiderpartiet)	6
Communist Party (Kommunistiske Parti)	1
Joint List(s) of Non-Socialist Parties (Borgerlige Felleslister)	6
Total number of members:	13

Budal herredsstyre 1951–1955
Party name (in Norwegian)	Number of representatives
Labour Party (Arbeiderpartiet)	5
Communist Party (Kommunistiske Parti)	2
Liberal Party (Venstre)	3
Local List(s) (Lokale lister)	2
Total number of members:	12

Budal herredsstyre 1947–1951
Party name (in Norwegian)	Number of representatives
Labour Party (Arbeiderpartiet)	5
Communist Party (Kommunistiske Parti)	2
Liberal Party (Venstre)	5
Total number of members:	12

Budal herredsstyre 1945–1947
Party name (in Norwegian)	Number of representatives
Labour Party (Arbeiderpartiet)	5
Communist Party (Kommunistiske Parti)	2
Farmers' Party (Bondepartiet)	1
Liberal Party (Venstre)	4
Total number of members:	12

Budal herredsstyre 1937–1941*
Party name (in Norwegian)	Number of representatives
Labour Party (Arbeiderpartiet)	5
Joint List(s) of Non-Socialist Parties (Borgerlige Felleslister)	5
Local List(s) (Lokale lister)	2
Total number of members:	12
Note: Due to the German occupation of Norway during World War II, no elections were held for new municipal councils until after the war ended in 1945.

=== Mayors ===
The mayor (Norwegian: ordfører) of Budal Municipality was the political leader of the municipality and the chairperson of the municipal council. Here is a list of people who held this position:

- 1879–1898: Lars Storrø (H)
- 1898–1898: Ellef Tollefsen Storbudal (H)
- 1899–1901: Nils Estensen Indseth (H)
- 1902–1913: Johan Bakken (V)
- 1914–1916: Ole Enlid (Ap)
- 1917–1919: Arnt Sæthermo (V)
- 1920–1925: Tollef Ellefsen Budal (Bp)
- 1926–1931: Arnt Sæthermo (V)
- 1932–1932: Bersvend Bjerkli (Bp)
- 1933–1933: Sven J. Enlid (Ap)
- 1933–1934: Arnt P. Sørløkken (Ap)
- 1935–1940: Nils Nilsen Indseth (Ap)
- 1941–1942: Fredrik Lillegraven (NS)
- 1942–1945: Arnt Storrøsæter (NS)
- 1945–1945: Nils Nilsen Indseth (Ap)
- 1946–1946: Gunnar Enlid (Ap)
- 1946–1947: Ingebrigt Raphaug (Ap)
- 1948–1951: Nils Nilsen Indseth (Ap)
- 1952–1955: Ingebrigt Raphaug (Ap)
- 1956–1959: Gunnar Enlid (Ap)
- 1960–1963: Jacob Hindbjørgen (Ap)

== See also ==
- List of former municipalities of Norway
