= Forollhogna National Park =

National park in Norway

- IUCN category II (national park)

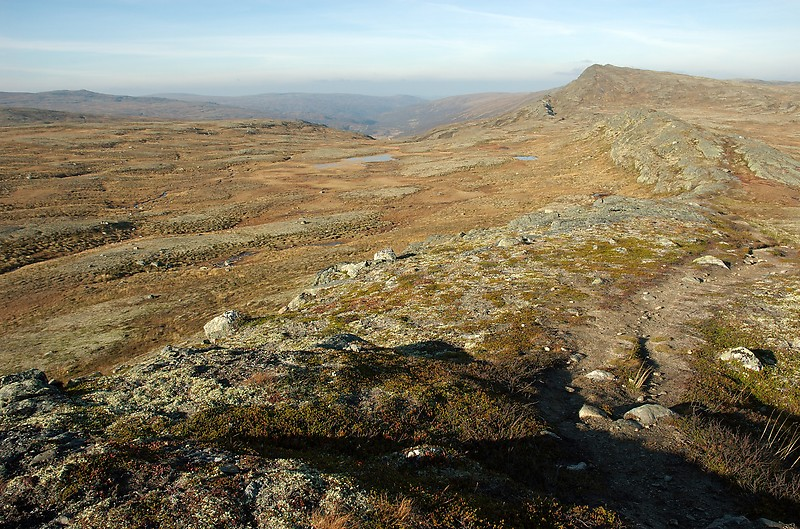
- View northwards from ascent of the mountain Forollhogna
- Interactive map of Forollhogna National Park
- Location: Counties of Trøndelag and Innlandet, Norway
- Nearest city: Røros
- Coordinates: 62°38′N 10°40′E
- Area: 1,062 km^{2} (410 sq mi)
- Established: 21 December 2001
- Governing body: Directorate for Nature Management
- Website: Forollhogna.no

Forollhogna National Park (Norwegian: Forollhogna nasjonalpark) is a national park in the counties of Trøndelag and Innlandet in Norway. The park includes extensive plant life and is an important range for wild reindeer. The park lies in the municipalities of Tynset, Tolga, and Os in Innlandet county and Holtålen, Midtre Gauldal, and Rennebu in Trøndelag county.

The scenery surrounding the mountain Forollhogna consists of large alpine areas, with gentle slopes rising from the valleys below—an area often referred to as "the gentle mountains". Here are thriving villages and a lush cultural landscape formed by the region's farming traditions. For centuries the mountain farms have been in use during the summer, and many still are. This is the setting of Forollhogna National Park, Norway's 19th park to be so designated.

== Name ==
The name is a composition of two words. The last element is the finite form of hogn which means "defender" or "protector" (this tall and impressive mountain marks the border between Trøndelag and Innlandet). The first element comes the name of the lake in the central part of the park: Forollen (Forollsjøen).
