= Singsås =

Village in Midtre Gauldal Municipality, Norway

- Village
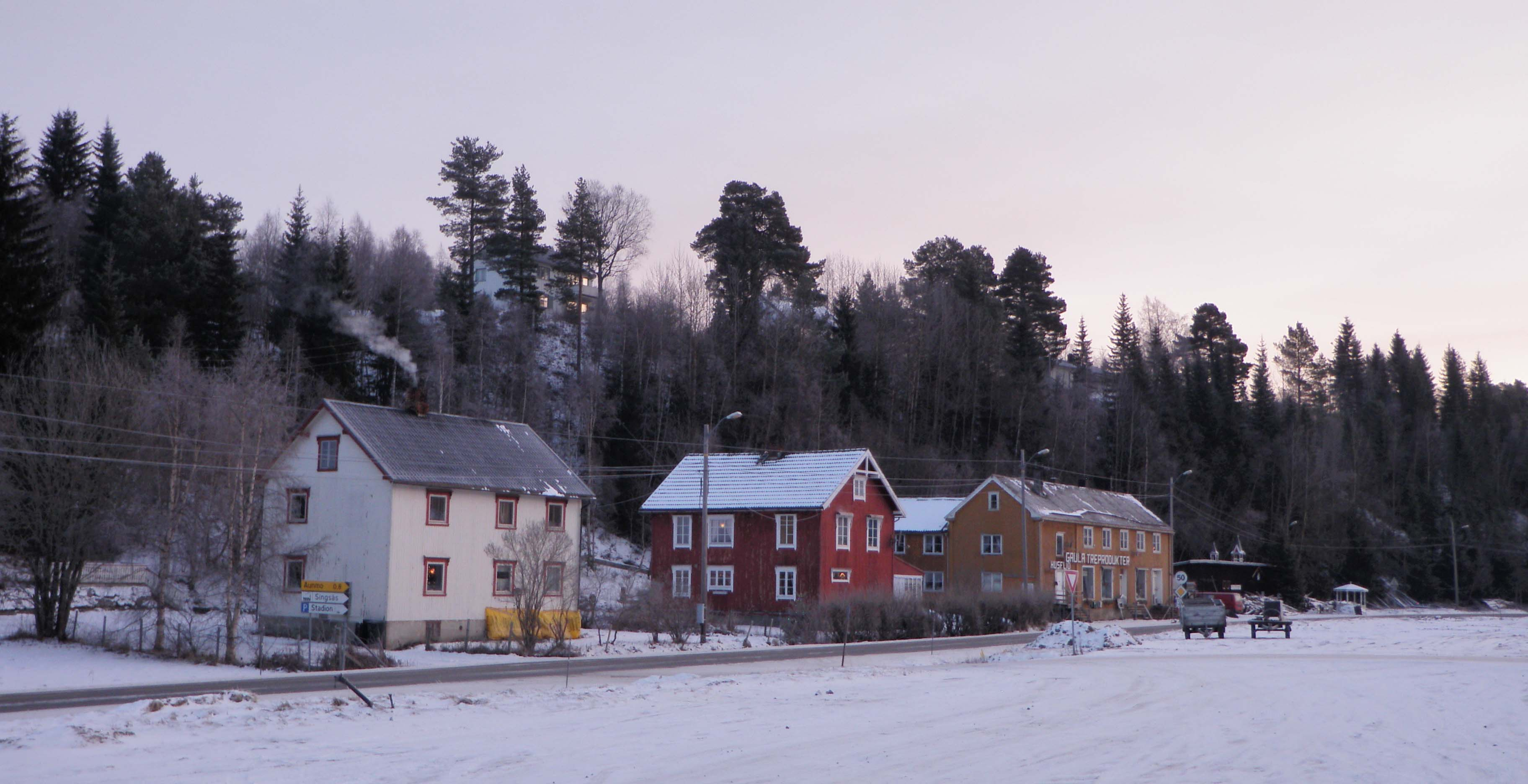
- View of the village
- Interactive map of Singsås
- Location within Trøndelag Location within Norway
- Coordinates: 62.9562°N 10.7308°E
- Country: Norway
- Region: Central Norway
- County: Trøndelag
- District: Gauldalen
- Municipality: Midtre Gauldal Municipality
- Elevation: 177 m (581 ft)
- Time zone: UTC+01:00 (CET)
  - Summer (DST): UTC+02:00 (CEST)
- Post Code: 7387 Singsås

Singsås is a village in Midtre Gauldal Municipality in Trøndelag county, Norway. The village is located in the Gauldalen valley, along the river Gaula, about 70 kilometres (43 mi) south of the city of Trondheim. The village of Haltdalen lies about 25 kilometres (16 mi) up the valley to the east and the village of Rognes lies about 15 kilometres (9.3 mi) down the valley to the west.

The Norwegian County Road 30 and the Rørosbanen railway line both pass through the village. Singsås Station is located in the centre part of the village while Singsås Church lies along the river, just west of the village at Fordsetmoen. There is a Coop store in Singsås.

== History ==
From 1841 until 1964, the village of Singsås was the administrative centre of the old Singsås Municipality.
