= Oddbjørn Snøfugl =

Norwegian politician

Oddbjørn Snøfugl (2 October 1941 – 14 December 2022) was a Norwegian school principal and politician for the Centre Party.

He grew up in Buvika at the Snøfugl farm. Not wanting a career as a farmer, he took the examen artium at Orkdal landsgymnas, tried working as a teacher in Bangsund and enrolled at the Norwegian Teachers' College. He graduated in 1971 with the cand.philol. degree, his graduate thesis in English being Edward Albee's play Box and Quotations from Chairman Mao Tse Tung: an analysis.

Snøfugl was hired as a teacher at Støren Secondary School, later Støren Upper Secondary School. In 1984 he was hired as headmaster of Melhus Upper Secondary School. He was recruited to Vinstra Upper Secondary School as headmaster in 1992. Moving to Lillehammer Municipality, he also worked in Oppland County Municipality as school director and vice chief administrative officer.

Following the 1975 Norwegian local elections, Snøfugl was elected mayor of Midtre Gauldal Municipality. He edged out Labour's Inge Grav with a 18–16 vote between the members of the municipal council. After a four-year term he stepped down and was replaced by his Centre party colleague Anders Storrøsæter. He served as a deputy representative to the Parliament of Norway from Sør-Trøndelag during the term 1969–1973. In total he met during 6 days of parliamentary session.

After retiring, Snøfugl wrote three books, one of them about a missionary in India, Johan Ofstad. Snøfugl also spent two years editing the local history yearbook Gauldalsminne. He resided in Støren.
