= Midtre Gauldal Municipality =

Municipality in Trøndelag, Norway

Midtre Gauldal Municipality Midtre Gauldal kommune
- Municipality
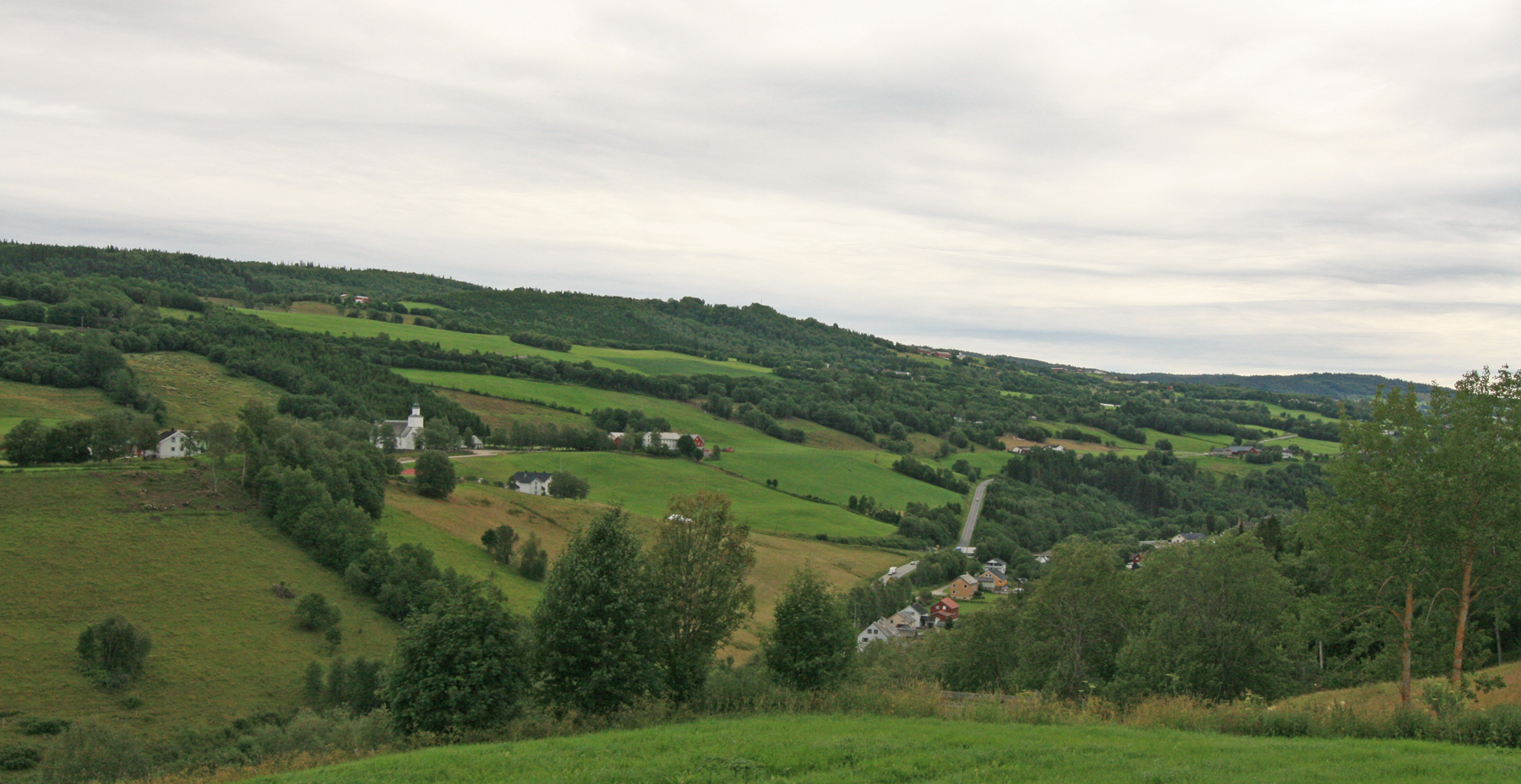

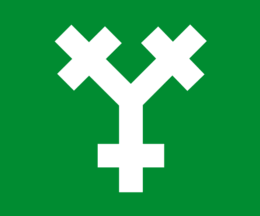
- Flag Coat of arms

- Trøndelag within Norway

- Midtre Gauldal within Trøndelag
- Coordinates: 62°55′16″N 10°30′02″E
- Country: Norway
- County: Trøndelag
- District: Gauldal
- Established: 1 Jan 1964
  - Preceded by: Budal, Singsås, Soknedal, and Støren
- Administrative centre: Støren

Government
  - Mayor (2023): Trude Solem Heggdal (Ap)

Area
  - Total: 1,860.43 km^{2} (718.32 sq mi)
  - Land: 1,803.24 km^{2} (696.23 sq mi)
  - Water: 57.19 km^{2} (22.08 sq mi) 3.1%
  - Rank: #44 in Norway
- Highest elevation: 1,332 m (4,370 ft)

Population (2024)
  - Total: 6,140
  - Rank: #160 in Norway
  - Density: 3.3/km^{2} (8.5/sq mi)
  - Change (10 years): ▼ −3.5%
- Demonym(s): Gauldaling; Gauldøl

Official language
  - Norwegian form: Bokmål
- Time zone: UTC+01:00 (CET)
  - Summer (DST): UTC+02:00 (CEST)
- ISO 3166 code: NO-5027
- Website: Official website

Midtre Gauldal is a municipality in Trøndelag county, Norway. It is part of the Gauldalen region. The administrative centre of the municipality is the village of Støren. Other villages in the municipality include Singsås, Soknedal, Enodden, and Rognes.

The 1,860-square-kilometre (720 sq mi) municipality is the 44th largest by area out of the 357 municipalities in Norway. Midtre Gauldal Municipality is the 160th most populous municipality in Norway with a population of 6,140. The municipality's population density is 3.3 inhabitants per square kilometre (8.5/sq mi) and its population has decreased by 3.5% over the previous 10-year period.

== General information ==
Midtre Gauldal was established as a new municipality on 1 January 1964 after the merger of four neighboring municipalities: Budal Municipality (population: 529), Singsås Municipality (population: 1,554), Soknedal Municipality (population: 1,916), and Støren Municipality (population: 2,296). On 1 January 2018, the municipality switched from the old Sør-Trøndelag county to the new Trøndelag county.

=== Name ===
The name Midtre Gauldal was created in 1964. The first element is the Norwegian word midtre meaning "middle" and the last part is Gauldal which is the name of the valley through which the river Gaula flows. Therefore, the meaning of the name is "the middle part of Gauldalen".

=== Coat of arms ===
The coat of arms was granted on 17 December 1982. The official blazon is "Vert, three crosses in pall conjoined argent" (Norwegian: I grønt tre sølv kors samlet i form av et gaffelkors). This means the arms have a green field (background) and the charge is a design made up of three crosses, joined in the middle, which makes a Y-shaped figure. The charge has a tincture of argent which means it is commonly colored white, but if it is made out of metal, then silver is used. The crossed-Y design has several meanings. First, it symbolizes the landscape which is based on the meeting of the main Gauldal and Soknedal valleys at the village of Støren. Furthermore, the municipality has a major Y-shaped road-and-railway junction. Finally, the Budal Church, dating from 1745 is one of the oldest and one of the few remaining Y-shaped churches in the country. The arms were designed by Halvor Aune. The municipal flag has the same design as the coat of arms.

=== Churches ===
The Church of Norway has four parishes (sokn) within Midtre Gauldal Municipality. It is part of the Gauldal prosti (deanery) in the Diocese of Nidaros.

Churches in Midtre Gauldal Municipality
Parish (sokn)	Church name	Location of the church	Year built
Budal	Budal Church	Budal	1754
Singsås	Singsås Church	Singsås	1884
Soknedal	Soknedal Church	Soknedal	1933
Støren	Støren Church	Støren	1817

== Geography ==
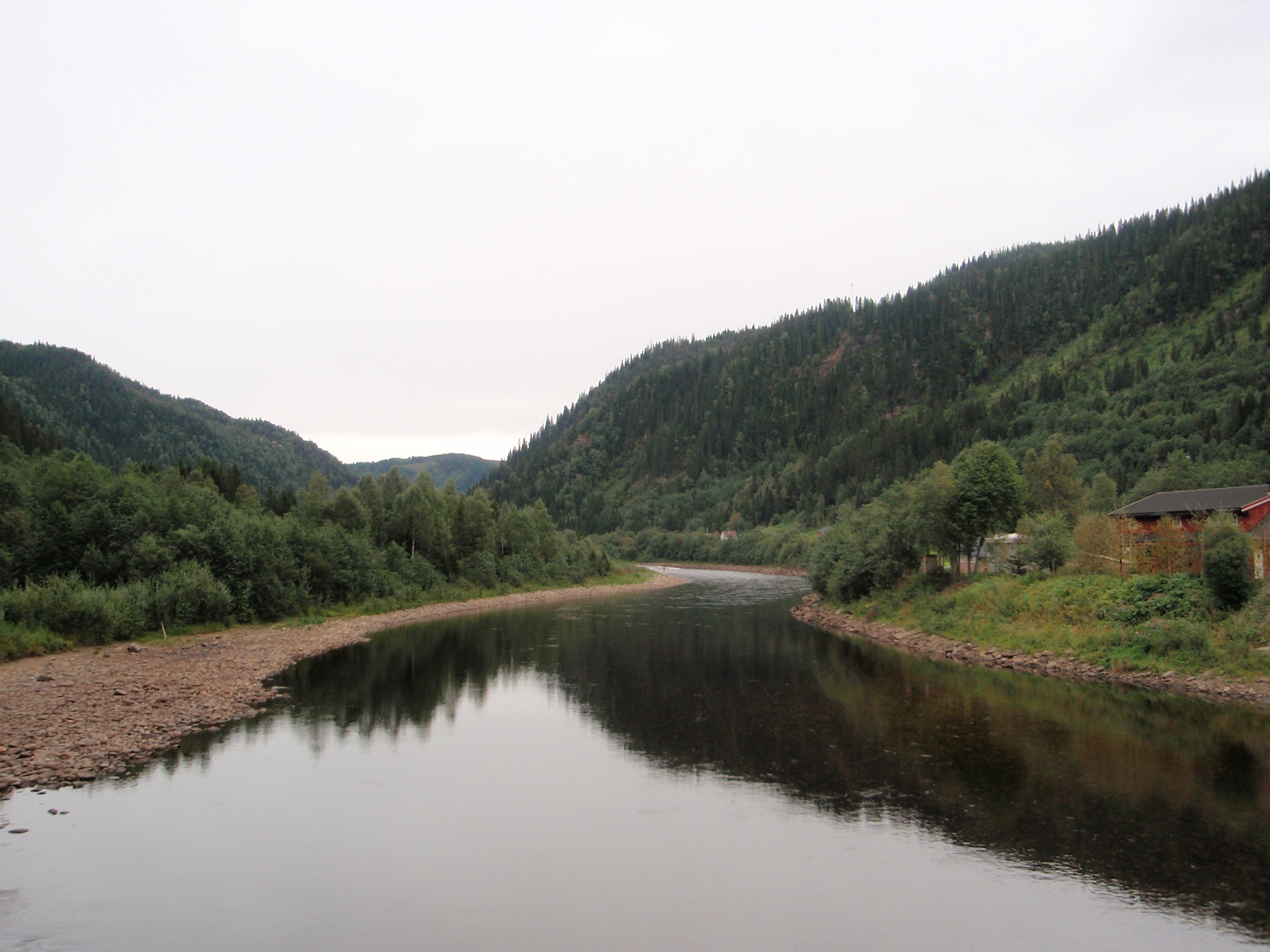
View of the Gaula River at Kotsøy

The municipality is bordered by Orkland Municipality to the west, Rennebu Municipality to the southwest, Melhus Municipality and Selbu Municipality to the north, Holtålen Municipality to the east, and Os Municipality and Tynset Municipality (in Innlandet county) to the southeast.

The lake Samsjøen is located in the northern part of the municipality. The Gauldalen valley follows the Gaula River through the municipality. The 1,332-metre (4,370 ft) tall mountain Forollhogna lies on the southern border of the municipality inside Forollhogna National Park, and it is the highest point in the municipality.

=== Climate ===
Kotsøy village in Midtre Gauldal is situated in the Gaula river valley close to Gaula river, surrounded by steep hills covered with spruce forest. The climate is boreal, but with fairly mild winters for this climate type, and not far from humid continental climate. The record high 34.3 °C (93.7 °F) was recorded 25 July 2019. The record low −31.1 °C (−24.0 °F) was recorded February 2010, and the January record low is also from 2010.

Climate data for Kotsøy 1991-2020 (127 m, extremes 2007-2024)
Month	Jan	Feb	Mar	Apr	May	Jun	Jul	Aug	Sep	Oct	Nov	Dec	Year
Record high °C (°F)	13.8 (56.8)	11.9 (53.4)	14 (57)	22.6 (72.7)	29.9 (85.8)	32.7 (90.9)	34.3 (93.7)	29.2 (84.6)	25.4 (77.7)	21.7 (71.1)	13.7 (56.7)	10.4 (50.7)	34.3 (93.7)
Daily mean °C (°F)	−4.1 (24.6)	−4.1 (24.6)	−0.9 (30.4)	3.3 (37.9)	8.1 (46.6)	11.9 (53.4)	14.7 (58.5)	13.7 (56.7)	9.4 (48.9)	3.7 (38.7)	−1 (30)	−4.2 (24.4)	4.2 (39.6)
Record low °C (°F)	−30.9 (−23.6)	−31.1 (−24.0)	−25.6 (−14.1)	−15.7 (3.7)	−4.3 (24.3)	0.2 (32.4)	2.3 (36.1)	2 (36)	−3 (27)	−15.1 (4.8)	−23.1 (−9.6)	−27.2 (−17.0)	−31.1 (−24.0)
Average precipitation mm (inches)	64 (2.5)	57 (2.2)	73 (2.9)	53 (2.1)	59 (2.3)	97 (3.8)	88 (3.5)	106 (4.2)	83 (3.3)	79 (3.1)	55 (2.2)	70 (2.8)	884 (34.9)
Source: Norwegian Meteorological Institute

== Government ==
Midtre Gauldal Municipality is responsible for primary education (through 10th grade), outpatient health services, senior citizen services, welfare and other social services, zoning, economic development, and municipal roads and utilities. The municipality is governed by a municipal council of directly elected representatives. The mayor is indirectly elected by a vote of the municipal council. The municipality is under the jurisdiction of the Trøndelag District Court and the Frostating Court of Appeal. Waste management was between 2003 and 2020 provided by the inter-municipal agency Envina, after which it merged into ReMidt. Since, waste collection has been operated by ReTrans Midt.

=== Municipal council ===
The municipal council (Kommunestyre) of Midtre Gauldal Municipality is made up of 33 representatives that are elected to four-year terms. The tables below show the current and historical composition of the council by political party.

Midtre Gauldal kommunestyre 2023–2027
Party name (in Norwegian)	Number of representatives
Labour Party (Arbeiderpartiet)	6
Conservative Party (Høyre)	3
Christian Democratic Party (Kristelig Folkeparti)	1
Pensioners' Party (Pensjonistpartiet)	1
Centre Party (Senterpartiet)	5
Municipal List for Midtre Gauldal (Bygdelista for Midtre Gauldal)	7
Total number of members:	23

Midtre Gauldal kommunestyre 2019–2023
Party name (in Norwegian)	Number of representatives
Labour Party (Arbeiderpartiet)	7
Progress Party (Fremskrittspartiet)	1
Conservative Party (Høyre)	2
Christian Democratic Party (Kristelig Folkeparti)	1
Centre Party (Senterpartiet)	10
Municipal List for Midtre Gauldal (Bygdelista for Midtre Gauldal)	4
Total number of members:	25

Midtre Gauldal kommunestyre 2015–2019
Party name (in Norwegian)	Number of representatives
Labour Party (Arbeiderpartiet)	13
Progress Party (Fremskrittspartiet)	2
Conservative Party (Høyre)	3
Christian Democratic Party (Kristelig Folkeparti)	2
Centre Party (Senterpartiet)	9
Liberal Party (Venstre)	1
Municipal List for Midtre Gauldal (Bygdelista for Midtre Gauldal)	3
Total number of members:	33

Midtre Gauldal kommunestyre 2011–2015
Party name (in Norwegian)	Number of representatives
Labour Party (Arbeiderpartiet)	13
Progress Party (Fremskrittspartiet)	3
Conservative Party (Høyre)	3
Christian Democratic Party (Kristelig Folkeparti)	2
Centre Party (Senterpartiet)	5
Liberal Party (Venstre)	1
Local List for Midtre Gauldal (Bygdelista for Midtre Gauldal)	6
Total number of members:	33

Midtre Gauldal kommunestyre 2007–2011
Party name (in Norwegian)	Number of representatives
Labour Party (Arbeiderpartiet)	13
Progress Party (Fremskrittspartiet)	3
Conservative Party (Høyre)	2
Christian Democratic Party (Kristelig Folkeparti)	2
Centre Party (Senterpartiet)	7
Socialist Left Party (Sosialistisk Venstreparti)	1
Liberal Party (Venstre)	1
Local people's list (Bygdefolkets liste)	4
Total number of members:	33

Midtre Gauldal kommunestyre 2003–2007
Party name (in Norwegian)	Number of representatives
Labour Party (Arbeiderpartiet)	12
Progress Party (Fremskrittspartiet)	2
Conservative Party (Høyre)	2
Christian Democratic Party (Kristelig Folkeparti)	2
Centre Party (Senterpartiet)	7
Socialist Left Party (Sosialistisk Venstreparti)	2
Liberal Party (Venstre)	1
Local people's list (Bygdefolkets liste)	5
Total number of members:	33

Midtre Gauldal kommunestyre 1999–2003
Party name (in Norwegian)	Number of representatives
Labour Party (Arbeiderpartiet)	12
Conservative Party (Høyre)	2
Christian Democratic Party (Kristelig Folkeparti)	4
Centre Party (Senterpartiet)	8
Socialist Left Party (Sosialistisk Venstreparti)	1
Liberal Party (Venstre)	2
Local people's list (Bygdefolkets liste)	4
Total number of members:	33

Midtre Gauldal kommunestyre 1995–1999
Party name (in Norwegian)	Number of representatives
Labour Party (Arbeiderpartiet)	14
Conservative Party (Høyre)	3
Christian Democratic Party (Kristelig Folkeparti)	3
Centre Party (Senterpartiet)	14
Socialist Left Party (Sosialistisk Venstreparti)	1
Liberal Party (Venstre)	2
Total number of members:	37

Midtre Gauldal kommunestyre 1991–1995
Party name (in Norwegian)	Number of representatives
Labour Party (Arbeiderpartiet)	11
Conservative Party (Høyre)	3
Christian Democratic Party (Kristelig Folkeparti)	4
Centre Party (Senterpartiet)	14
Socialist Left Party (Sosialistisk Venstreparti)	3
Liberal Party (Venstre)	2
Total number of members:	37

Midtre Gauldal kommunestyre 1987–1991
Party name (in Norwegian)	Number of representatives
Labour Party (Arbeiderpartiet)	16
Conservative Party (Høyre)	5
Christian Democratic Party (Kristelig Folkeparti)	4
Centre Party (Senterpartiet)	9
Socialist Left Party (Sosialistisk Venstreparti)	1
Liberal Party (Venstre)	2
Total number of members:	37

Midtre Gauldal kommunestyre 1983–1987
Party name (in Norwegian)	Number of representatives
Labour Party (Arbeiderpartiet)	17
Conservative Party (Høyre)	5
Christian Democratic Party (Kristelig Folkeparti)	4
Centre Party (Senterpartiet)	8
Socialist Left Party (Sosialistisk Venstreparti)	1
Liberal Party (Venstre)	2
Total number of members:	37

Midtre Gauldal kommunestyre 1979–1983
Party name (in Norwegian)	Number of representatives
Labour Party (Arbeiderpartiet)	15
Conservative Party (Høyre)	4
Christian Democratic Party (Kristelig Folkeparti)	4
Centre Party (Senterpartiet)	10
Socialist Left Party (Sosialistisk Venstreparti)	1
Liberal Party (Venstre)	3
Total number of members:	37

Midtre Gauldal kommunestyre 1975–1979
Party name (in Norwegian)	Number of representatives
Labour Party (Arbeiderpartiet)	15
Conservative Party (Høyre)	3
Christian Democratic Party (Kristelig Folkeparti)	5
Centre Party (Senterpartiet)	12
Socialist Left Party (Sosialistisk Venstreparti)	1
Liberal Party (Venstre)	1
Total number of members:	37

Midtre Gauldal kommunestyre 1971–1975
Party name (in Norwegian)	Number of representatives
Labour Party (Arbeiderpartiet)	17
Conservative Party (Høyre)	2
Christian Democratic Party (Kristelig Folkeparti)	4
Centre Party (Senterpartiet)	11
Socialist People's Party (Sosialistisk Folkeparti)	1
Liberal Party (Venstre)	2
Total number of members:	37

Midtre Gauldal kommunestyre 1967–1971
Party name (in Norwegian)	Number of representatives
Labour Party (Arbeiderpartiet)	16
Conservative Party (Høyre)	2
Christian Democratic Party (Kristelig Folkeparti)	3
Centre Party (Senterpartiet)	11
Socialist People's Party (Sosialistisk Folkeparti)	2
Liberal Party (Venstre)	3
Total number of members:	37

Midtre Gauldal kommunestyre 1964–1967
Party name (in Norwegian)	Number of representatives
Labour Party (Arbeiderpartiet)	19
Conservative Party (Høyre)	2
Christian Democratic Party (Kristelig Folkeparti)	4
Centre Party (Senterpartiet)	9
Liberal Party (Venstre)	3
Total number of members:	37

=== Mayors ===
The mayor (Norwegian: ordfører) of Midtre Gauldal is the political leader of the municipality and the chairperson of the municipal council. Here is a list of people who have held this position:

- 1964–1967: Jacob Hindbjørgen (Ap)
- 1968–1975: Ola Birger Vagnild (Sp)
- 1976–1983: Oddbjørn Snøfugl (Sp)
- 1984–1987: Anders Storrøsæter (Sp)
- 1988–1995: Fredrik Busklein (Sp)
- 1995–2003: Kolbjørn Tangvik (Ap)
- 2003–2015: Erling Lenvik (Ap)
- 2015–2023: Sivert Moen (Sp)
- 2023–present: Trude Solem Heggdal (Ap)

== Media ==
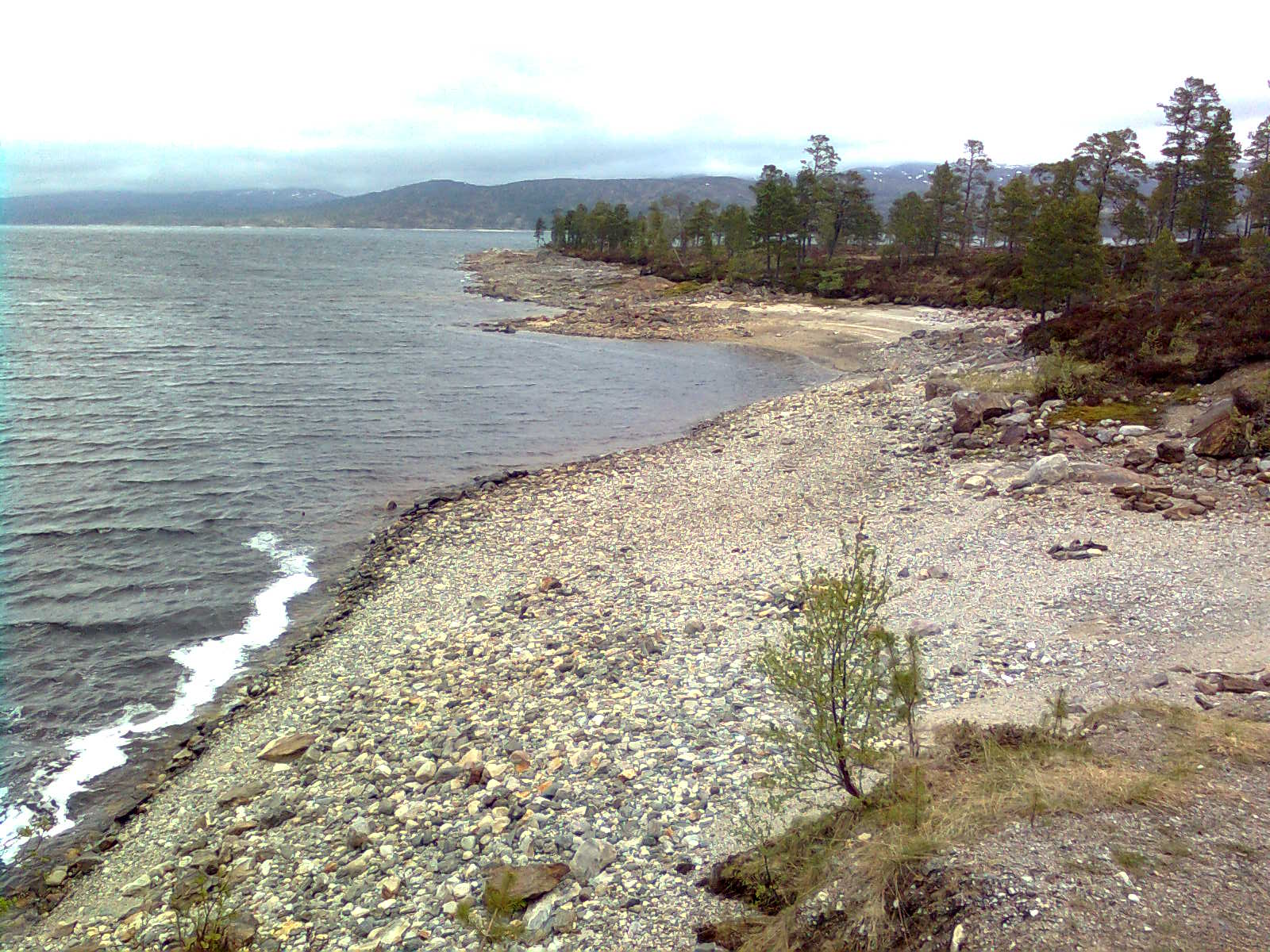
Samsjøen lake, Midtre Gauldal

The newspaper Gauldalsposten is published in Midtre Gauldal.

== Transportation ==
European route E6 crosses the municipality from north to south. The Dovrebanen and Rørosbanen railway lines also cross the municipality. Some of the stations on those lines include Støren Station and Singsås Station.

== Notable people ==
- Vincents Stoltenberg Bull (1882 in Støren – 1935), an engineer and businessperson
- Oddbjørn Snøfugl (born 1941), a Norwegian politician who lives in Støren
- Karl Erik Zachariassen (1942–2009), an entomologist who lived in Soknedal
- Helge Anshushaug (born 1948 in Soknedal), a retired sport shooter who competed at the 1972 and 1976 Summer Olympics
