= Singsås Church =

Church in Trøndelag, Norway

- Singsås kirke
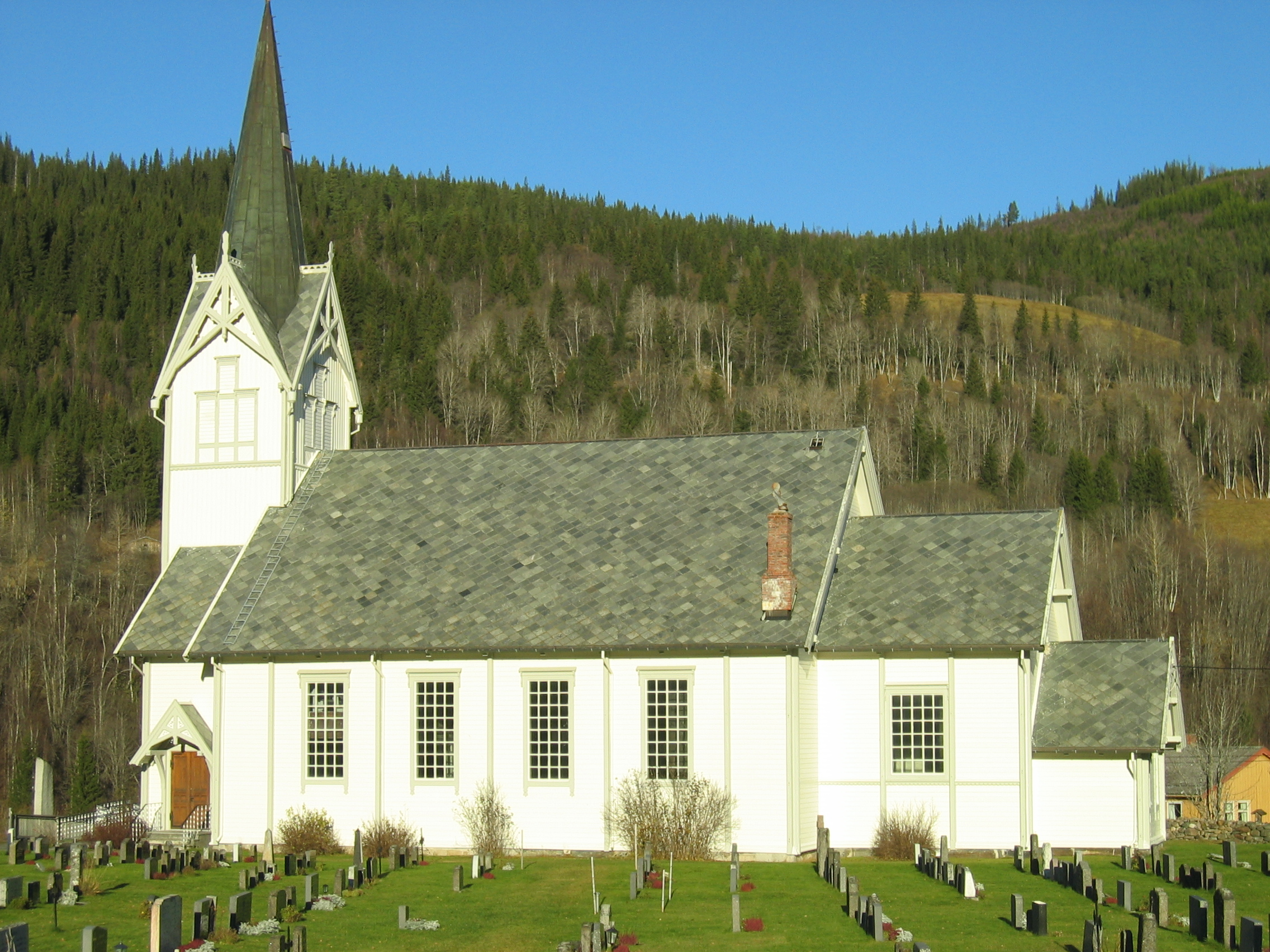
- View of the church
- Singsås Church
- 62.941830378°N 10.6504672765°E
- Location: Midtre Gauldal Municipality, Trøndelag
- Country: Norway
- Denomination: Church of Norway
- Churchmanship: Evangelical Lutheran

History
- Status: Parish church
- Founded: 13th century
- Consecrated: 24 Oct 1884

Architecture
- Functional status: Active
- Architect: Johan Digre
- Architectural type: Long church
- Style: Neo-Gothic
- Completed: 1884 (142 years ago)

Specifications
- Capacity: 450
- Materials: Wood

Administration
- Diocese: Nidaros bispedømme
- Deanery: Gauldal prosti
- Parish: Singsås
- Norwegian Cultural Heritage Site
- Type: Church
- Status: Not protected
- ID: 85432

Singsås Church (Norwegian: Singsås kirke) is a parish church of the Church of Norway in Midtre Gauldal Municipality in Trøndelag county, Norway. It is located in the village of Singsås. It is the church for the Singsås parish which is part of the Gauldal prosti (deanery) in the Diocese of Nidaros. The white, wooden church was built in a neo-Gothic long church style in 1884 using plans drawn up by the architect Johan Digre. The church seats about 450 people.

== History ==
The earliest existing historical records of the church date back to the year 1533, but the church was likely built around the year 1280. A crucifix in the church has been dated to around the year 1280, so it is likely that was when the church was constructed. The first church was a stave church that was located about 5 kilometres (3.1 mi) to the northeast, further up the Gaula river valley.

In 1684-1685, the old church was enlarged. A new nave was built on the west end of the building and the remaining parts of the old building were repurposed. The old nave became the new choir and the old choir became a sacristy. In 1723, the church was sold, along with many other churches in Norway, during the Norwegian church sale to help the King pay off war debts. The church was owned by various private landowners over the years. The private owners did not take great care of the old church and eventually the municipality attempted to purchase the church, but they did not accomplish this until 1880.

Soon after, in 1884, a new church was built about 5 kilometres (3.1 mi) to the southwest of the old church site. The new church was designed by Johan Digre and built by his father, Jacob Digre. It was consecrated on 24 October 1884. After the new building was completed, the old church was torn down. The new church was remodeled during the 1950s in several stages using plans by John Egil Tverdahl. One of the changes made was that the chancel opening is now arched, but was originally (before the 1950s) it was more neo-Gothic in design.

== Media gallery ==
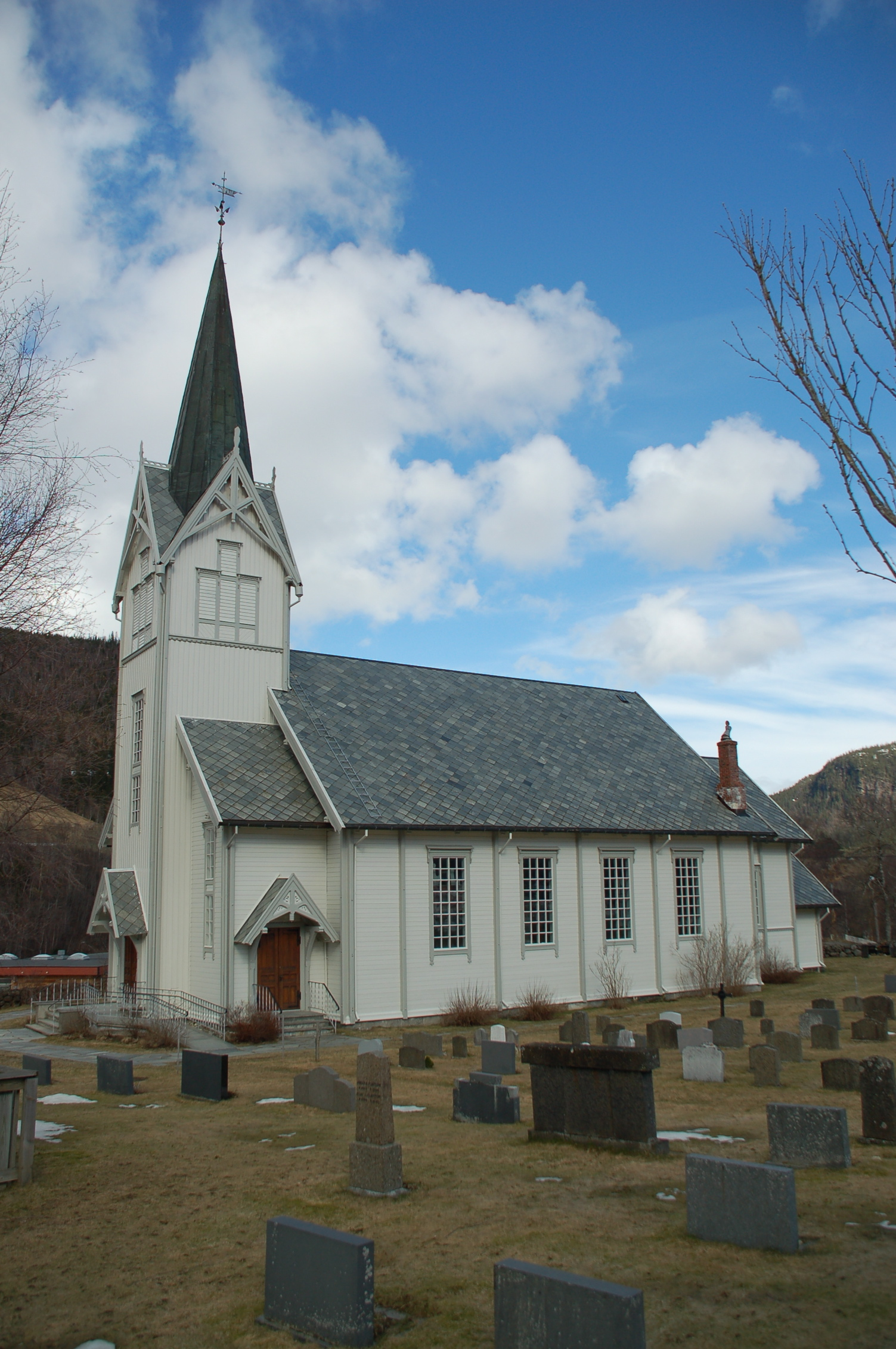
View of the present church (2007)

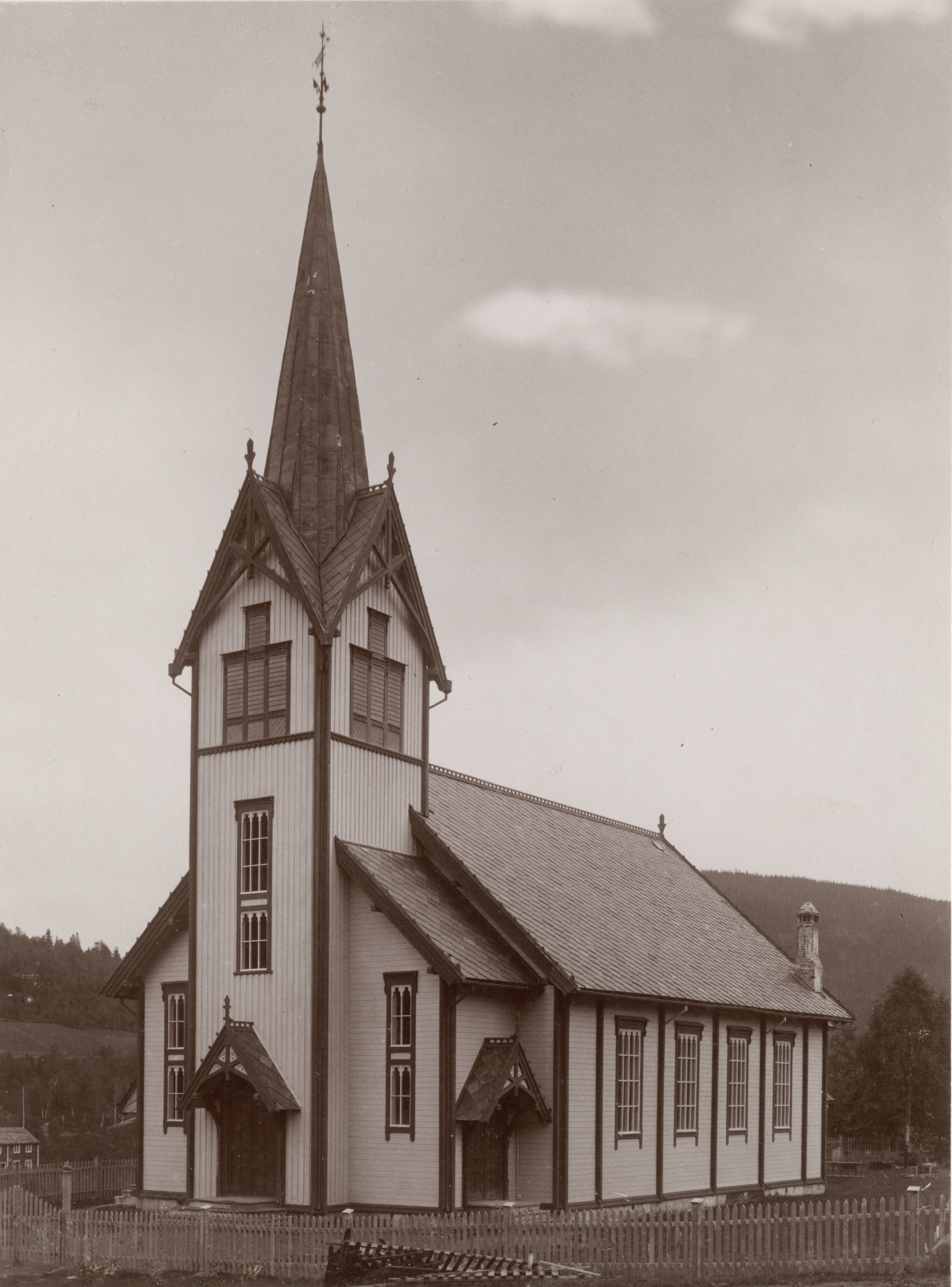
Older view of the present church

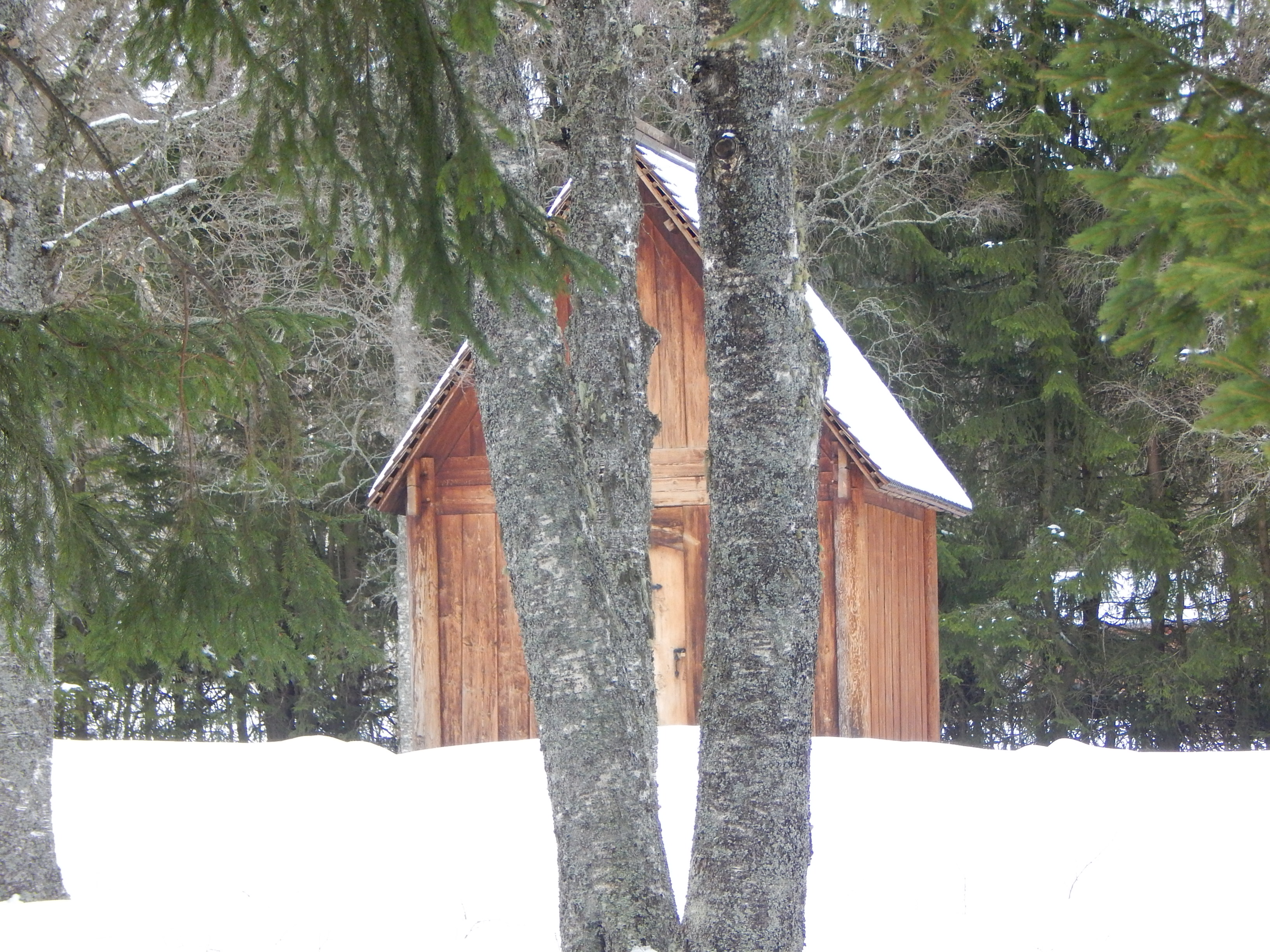
In 2012, "Singsås nye stavkirke" was consecrated at the site of the old church.

== See also ==
- List of churches in Nidaros
