= Singsås Station =

Railway station in Midtre Gauldal, Norway

Singsås Station Singsås stasjon
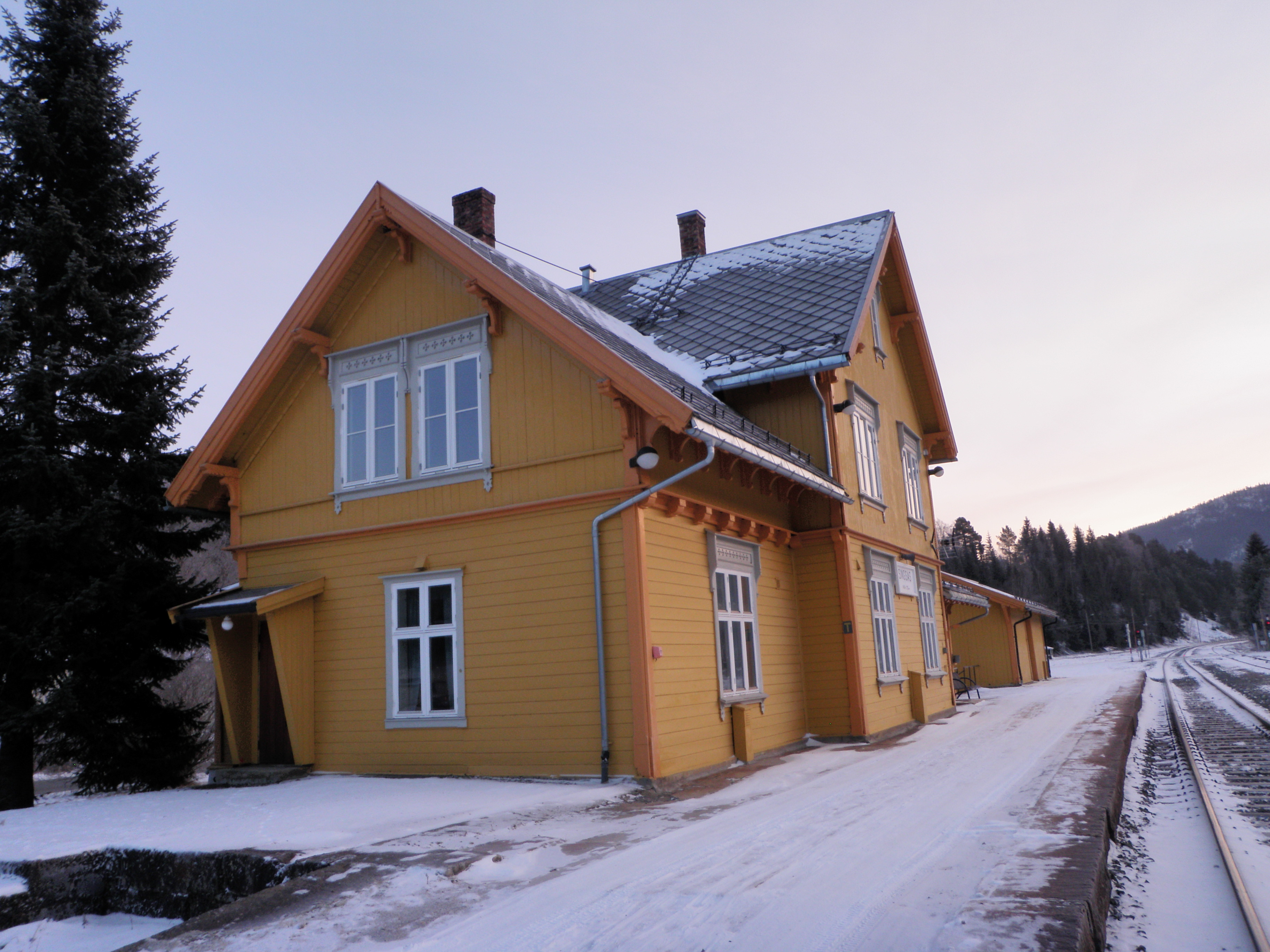
- View of the station

General information
- Location: Singsås, Midtre Gauldal Municipality; Norway
- Coordinates: 62.9562°N 10.7278°E
- Elevation: 175.6 m (576 ft)
- System: Railway station
- Owner: Bane NOR
- Operator: Bane NOR
- Line: Rørosbanen
- Distance: 479.92 km (298.21 mi)
- Platforms: 1

History
- Opened: 1876
Location
- Location within Trøndelag Location within Norway

Singsås Station (Norwegian: Singsås stasjon) is a railway station located in the village of Singsås in Midtre Gauldal Municipality in Trøndelag county, Norway. It is located along the Rørosbanen railway line. The station is served three times daily in each direction by the Trøndelag Commuter Rail service between Røros and Trondheim. The service is operated by SJ Norge.

== History ==
The station was opened in 1876, one year before the Rørosbanen railway line was completed.

Preceding station			Following station
Haltdalen	Røros Line		Støren
Preceding station	Regional trains		Following station
Haltdalen	R60	Røros–Trondheim	Støren
