= Forollhogna =

Mountain in Norway

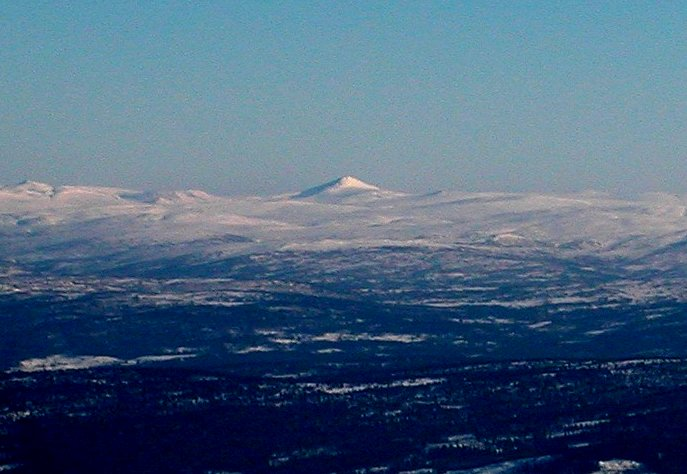
- Forollhogna (image center) as seen from Ilfjellet (west)

Highest point
- Elevation: 1,332 m (4,370 ft)
- Prominence: 700 m (2,300 ft)
- Isolation: 35.8 to 36 km (22.2 to 22.4 mi)
- Coordinates: 62.6789°N 10.7924°E

Geography
- Interactive map of the mountain
- Location: Trøndelag and Innlandet, Norway
- Topo map: 1620 II Dalsbygda

Forollhogna is a mountain located on the border between three municipalities in Norway: Midtre Gauldal Municipality and Holtålen Municipality (in Trøndelag county) and Os Municipality (in Innlandet county). The 1,332-metre (4,370 ft) tall mountain Forollhogna is the highest mountain inside Forollhogna National Park.

The mountain is about 27 kilometres (17 mi) southeast of the village of Enodden in Midtre Gauldal Municipality and about 30 kilometres (19 mi) northwest of town of Røros.

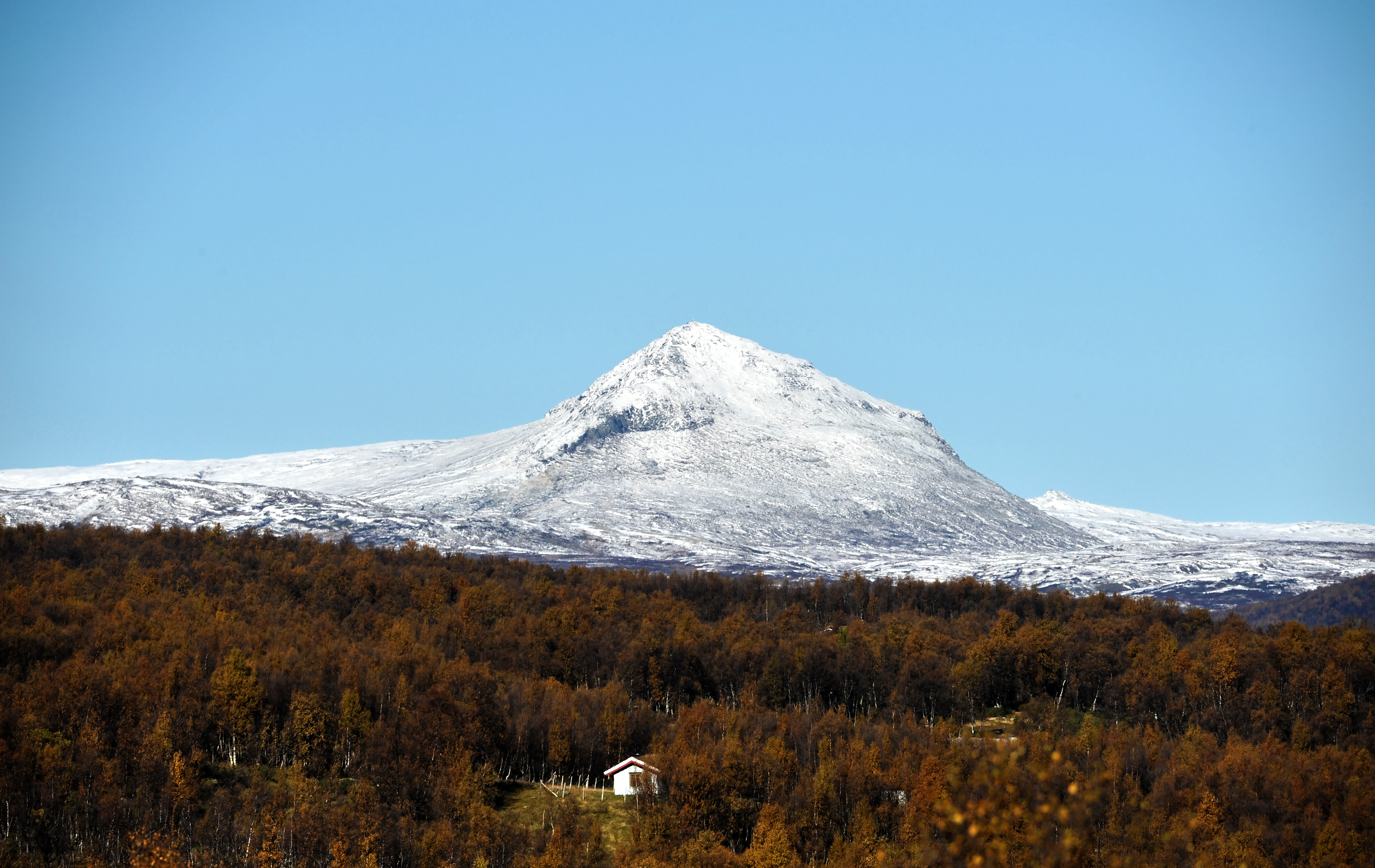
Forollhogna as seen from southeast
