= Gaula (Trøndelag) =

River in Trøndelag, Norway

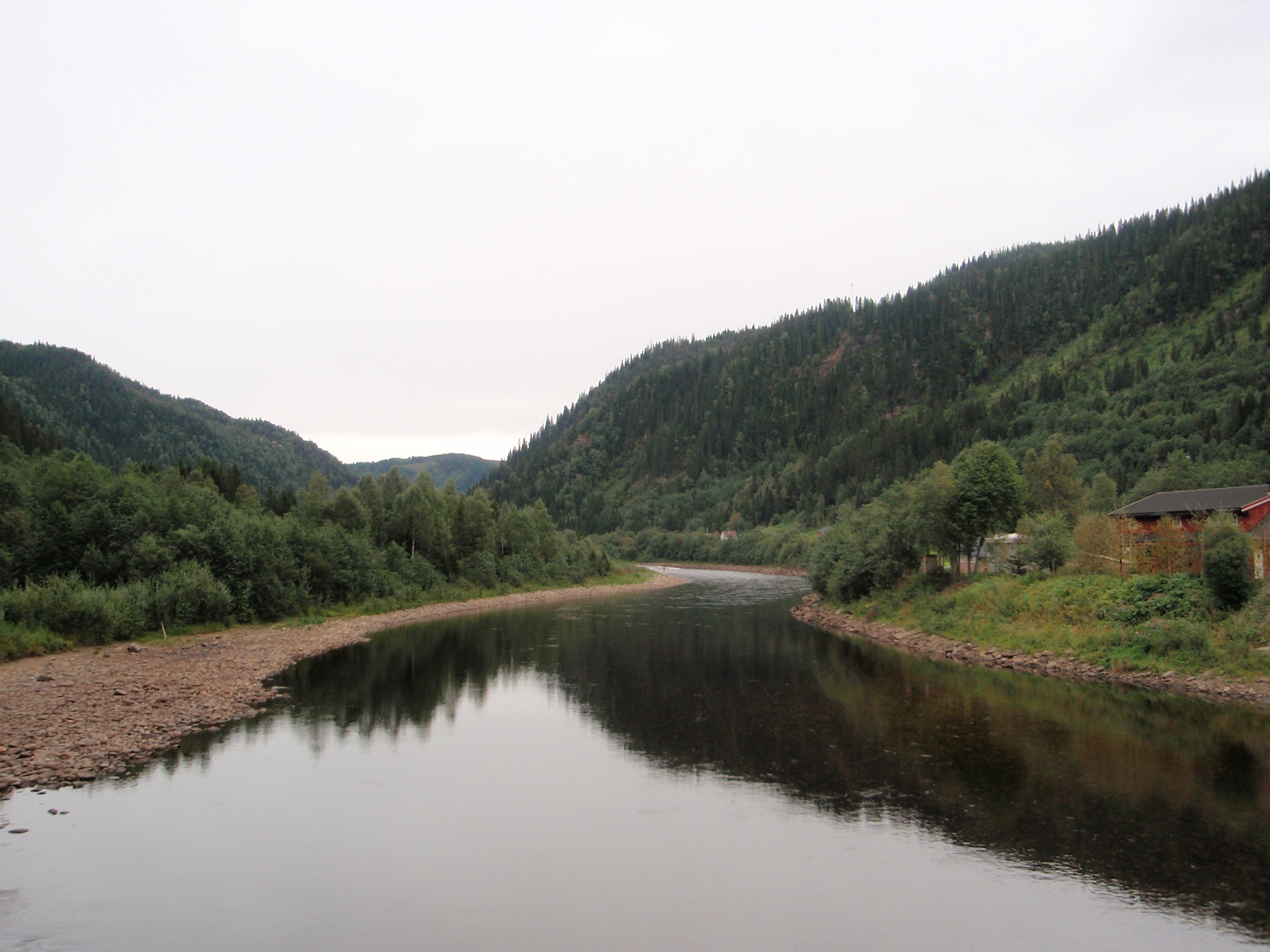
- Gaula River at Kotsøy

Location
- Country: Norway
- County: Trøndelag
- Municipalities: Holtålen Municipality; Midtre Gauldal Municipality; Melhus Municipality; Trondheim Municipality

Physical characteristics
- Source: Kjølifjellet
  - location: Holtålen Municipality, Trøndelag
  - coordinates: 62.88043°N 11.5981°E
  - elevation: 950 metres (3,120 ft)
- Mouth: Trondheimsfjorden
  - location: Melhus/Trondheim, Trøndelag
  - coordinates: 63.3426°N 10.2296°E
  - elevation: 0 metres (0 ft)
- Length: 152.8 km (94.9 mi)
- Basin size: 3,661 km^{2} (1,414 sq mi)
- Discharge
  - average: 97 m^{3}/s (3,400 cu ft/s)

Basin features
- River system: Gaula
- Landmarks: Gauldalen valley
- Waterfalls: Gaulfoss, Eggefoss

The Gaula is a river that flows through the Gauldal valley in Trøndelag county, Norway. The 153-kilometre (95 mi) long river is the largest in Central Norway. The river begins in Holtålen Municipality near the mountain Kjølifjellet. It then flows through Holtålen Municipality, Midtre Gauldal Municipality, and Melhus Municipality before emptying into Trondheimsfjord near Nypan/Leinstrand on the border between Trondheim Municipality and Melhus Municipality.

The Gaula River is approximately 152.8 kilometres (94.9 mi) long and it drains a watershed of about 3,661 square kilometres (1,414 sq mi). On its way, it is joined by one large tributary, the Sokna, at the village of Støren in Midtre Gauldal Municipality. Other smaller tributaries include the Rugla, Hesja, Holda, Forda, and Bua. The average flow of water is about 97 m^{3}/s (3,400 cu ft/s).

Within the Gaula River, there are two well known waterfalls called Gaulfoss close to the village of Hovin and the Eggafoss near the village of Haltdalen.

In 2005, the Gaula was named the best salmon fishing river in Norway with a catch of 37.5 tonnes (36.9 long tons; 41.3 short tons) that year. In 2008, it had a catch of 42.5 tonnes (41.8 long tons; 46.8 short tons). The Gaula is consistently listed among the top 5 salmon fishing rivers in Norway.
