= Gauldal =

Valley and district in Trøndelag, Norway

Gauldalen
- Gauldal
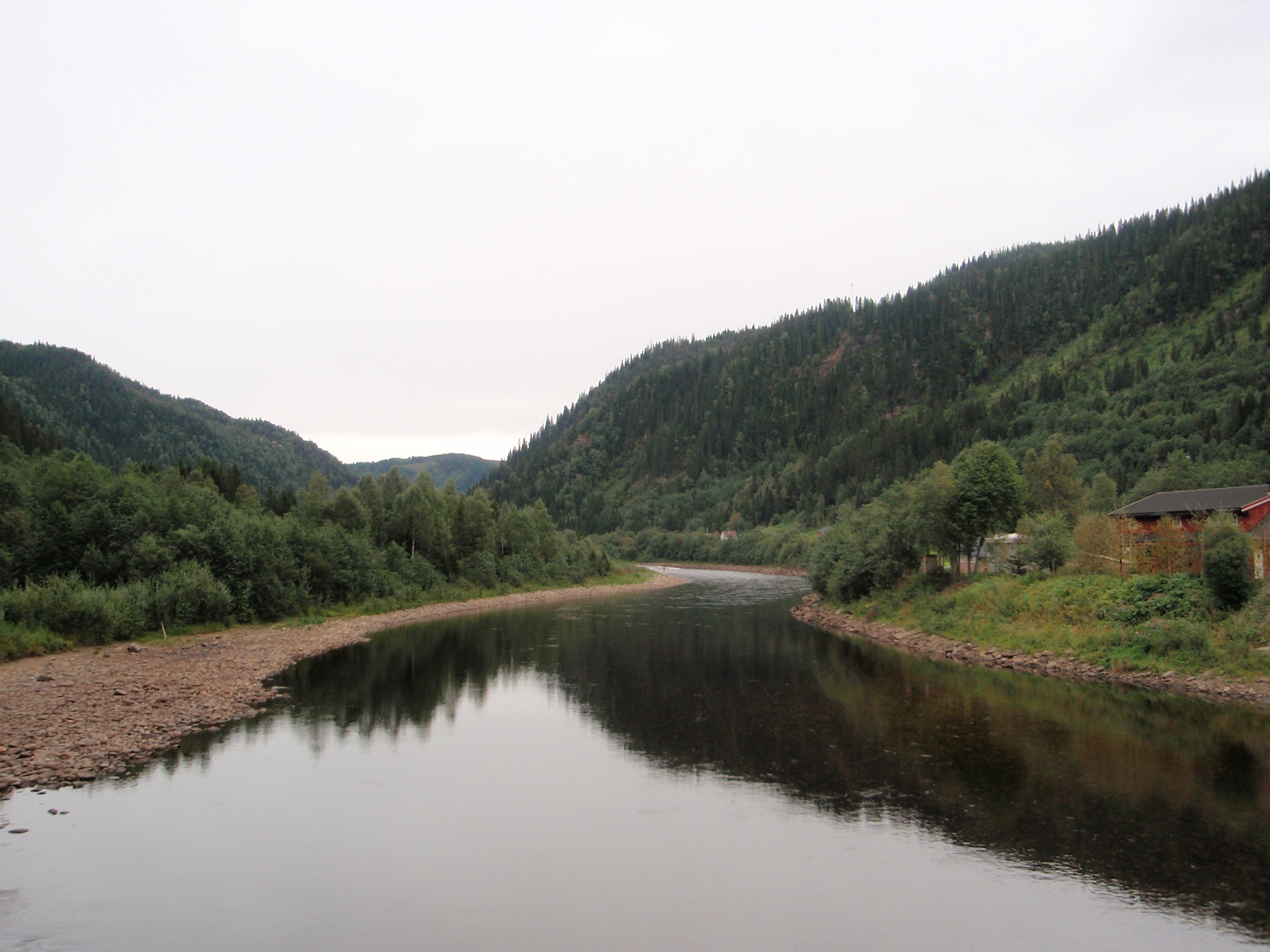
- View of the Gaula River at Kotsøy in Midtre Gauldal
- Length: 145 kilometres (90 mi)

Geology
- Type: River valley

Geography
- Location: Trøndelag, Norway
- Coordinates: 62.9681°N 10.9675°E
- Rivers: Gaula

Location
- Interactive map of the valley

Gauldal or Gauldalen (English: Gaula River valley) is a valley and traditional district in Trøndelag county, Norway. The river Gaula runs through the 145-kilometre (90 mi) long valley from the mountains in Røros Municipality near the lake Aursunden to the Trondheimsfjorden. The narrow valley runs northwards from Røros to the Haltdalen area, where it widens some, turns and heads generally to the west to the village of Støren. At Støren it turns again and heads north through what is now a wide, agricultural valley until it reaches the sea just south of the city of Trondheim. The Rørosbanen and Dovrebanen railway lines follow the Gauldalen valley on their way to Trondheim. The European route E6 highway and the Norwegian County Road 30 also follow the valley.

The traditional district of Gauldal includes Holtålen Municipality, Midtre Gauldal Municipality, and Melhus Municipality. Røros Municipality is often (traditionally) counted as a part of the district, even though it lies outside the actual Gaula river valley.

== History ==
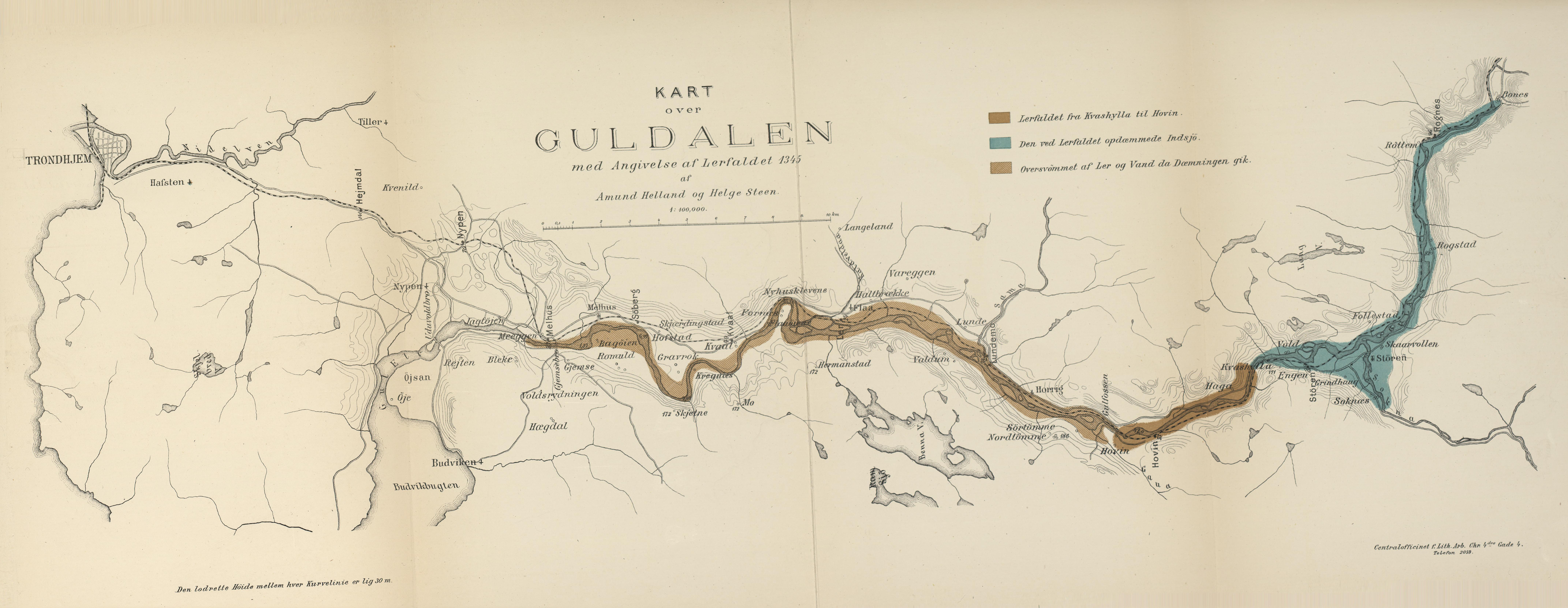
Map of the valley and flooded areas. The blue areas were flooded by the dammed river and the brown areas were flooded after the dam broke

In September 1345, there was a landslide just north of the village of Støren. The landslide was at a very narrow point in the valley and possibly 45,000,000 cubic metres (59,000,000 yd^{3}) of gravel and dirt from the mountainside fell and blocked the valley and Gaula river below creating a dam on the river that was possibly 30 to 40 metres (98 to 131 ft) high. This tremendous landslide then created a quickly rising lake that began to flood the valley up to 15 kilometres (9.3 mi) upstream from the dam. This newly formed lake flooded and destroyed 25 upstream farms in the narrow valley. The vast amount of water building up behind the earthen dam from the landslide did not hold long and, when it burst, the water rushed though the dam and caused a major flood downstream, killing about 500 people and destroying another 25 farms as well as several churches. The downstream flash flood continued to just past the village of Melhus, not far from the mouth of the river Gaula. This was one of the worst natural disasters ever in Norway.

== Media gallery ==
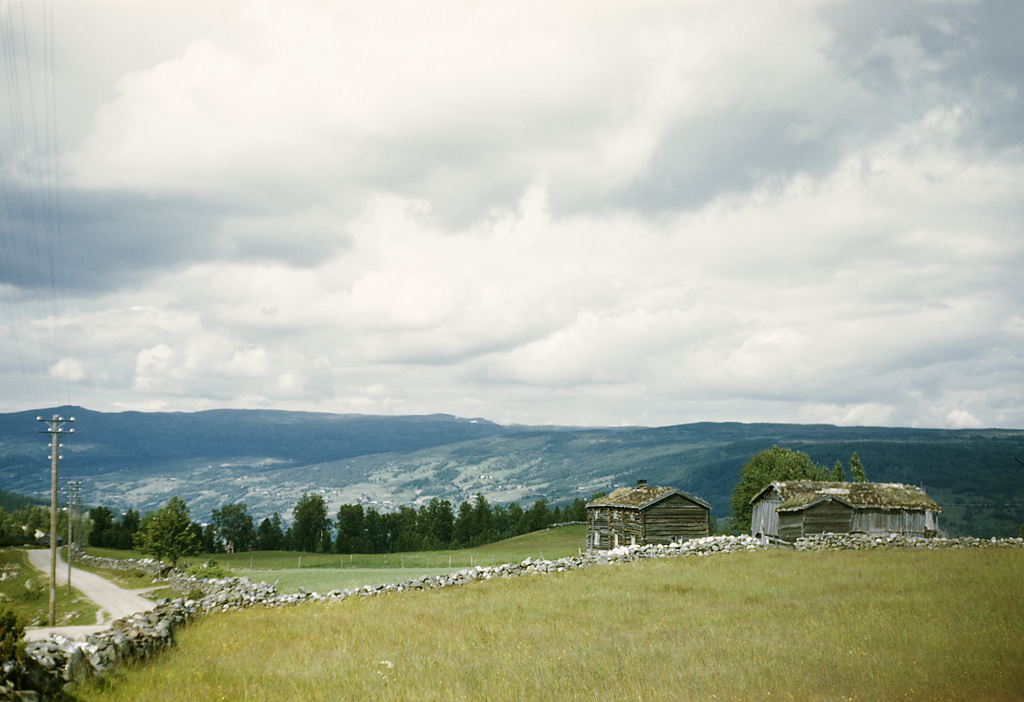
Gauldalen valley

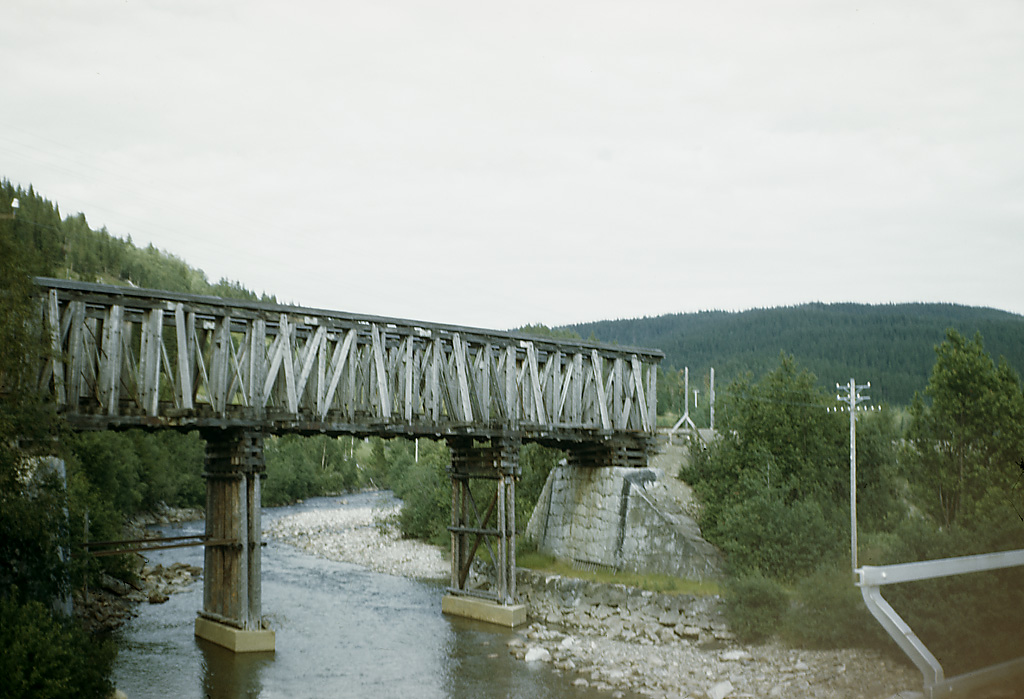
Gauldalen valley

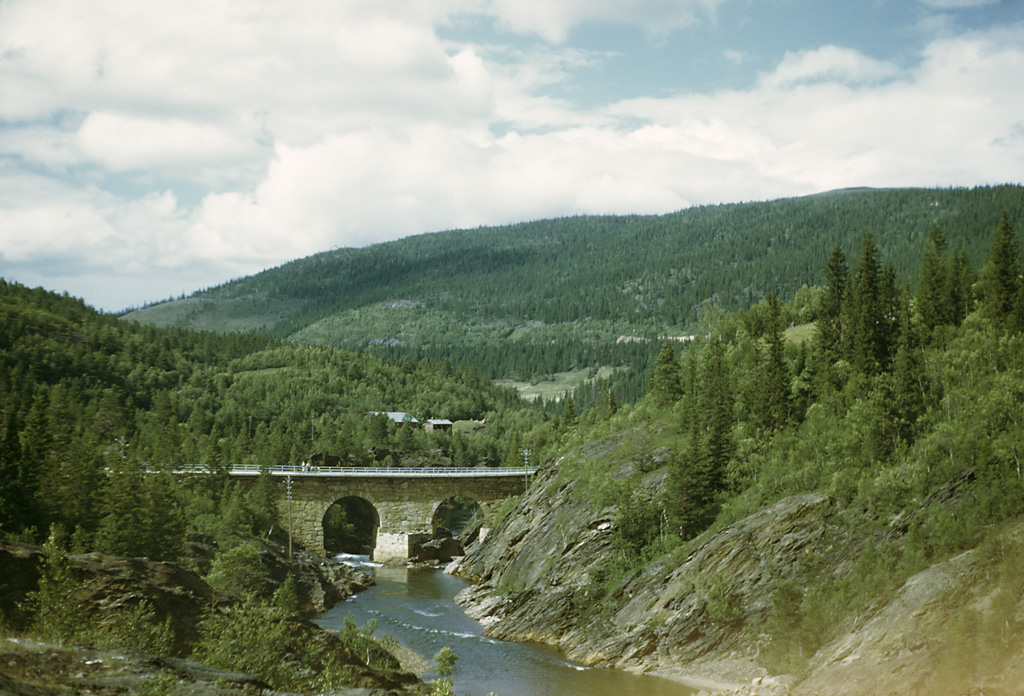
Gauldalen valley

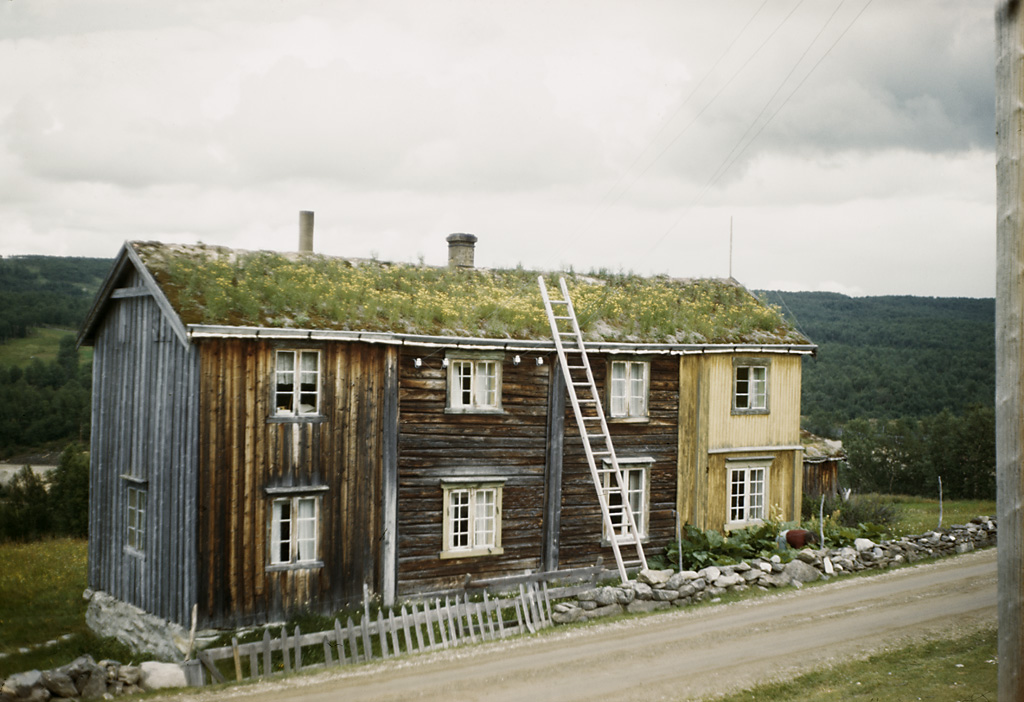
Historic farm in the valley

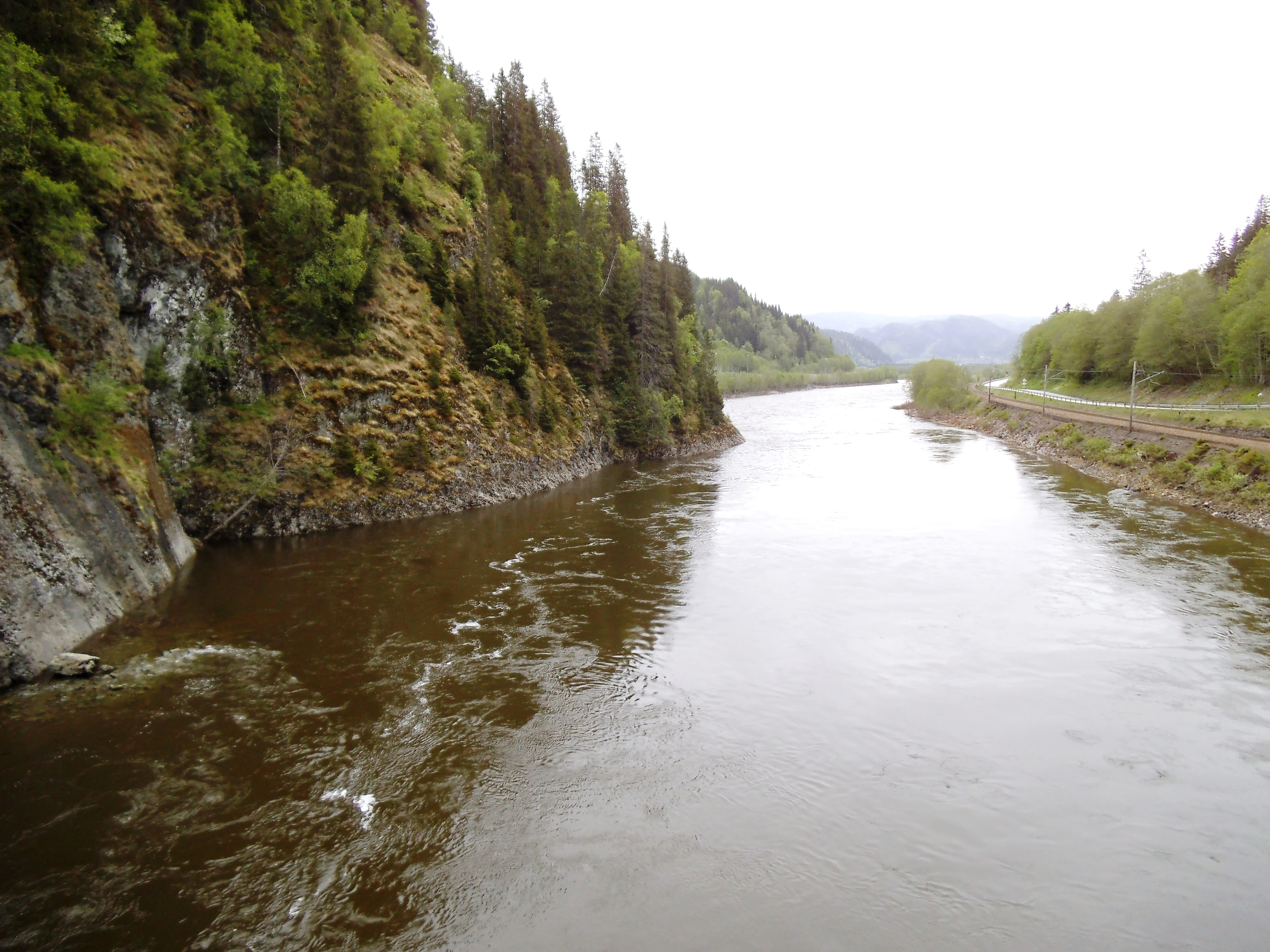
Gaula river

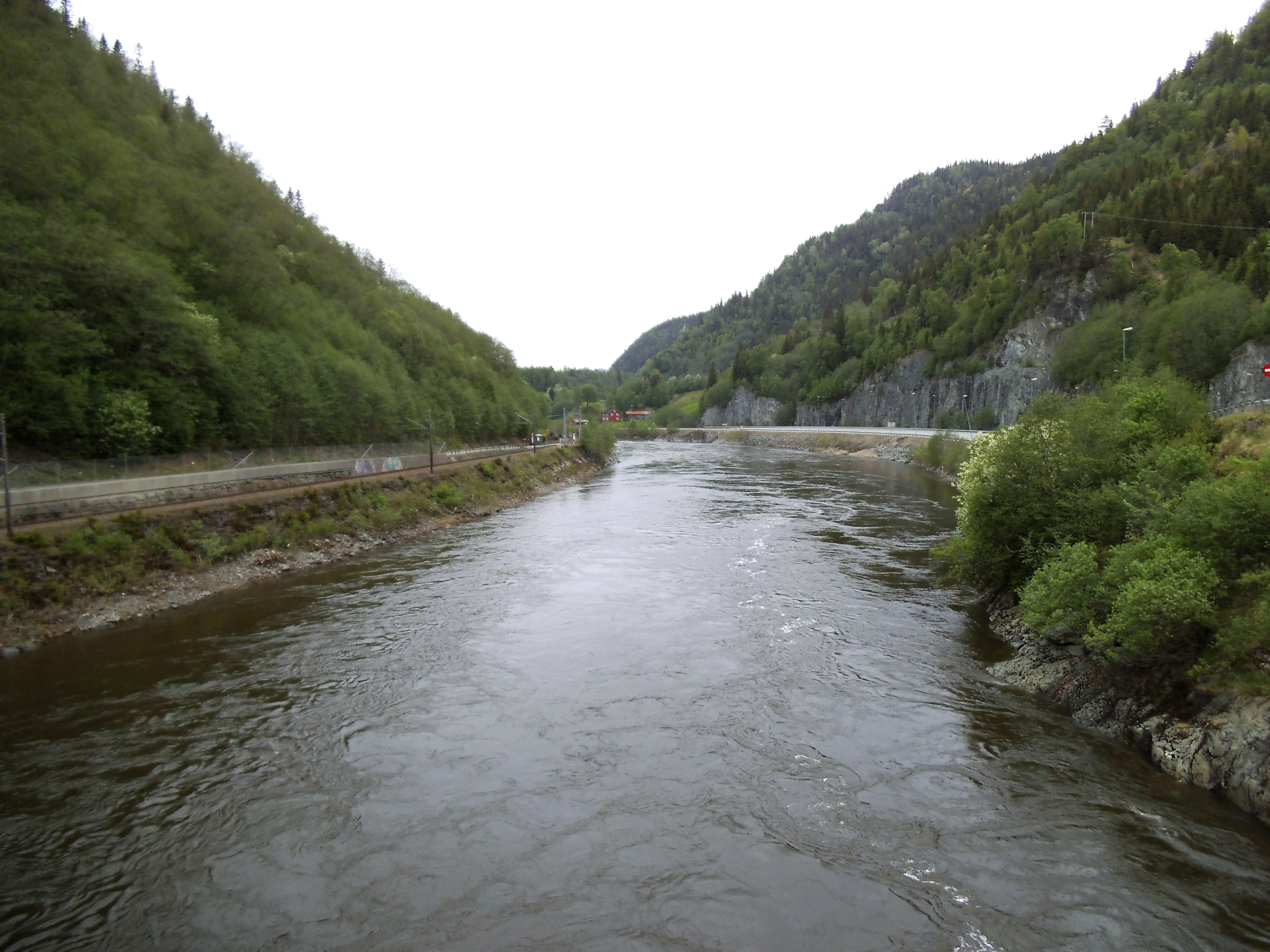
Gaula river

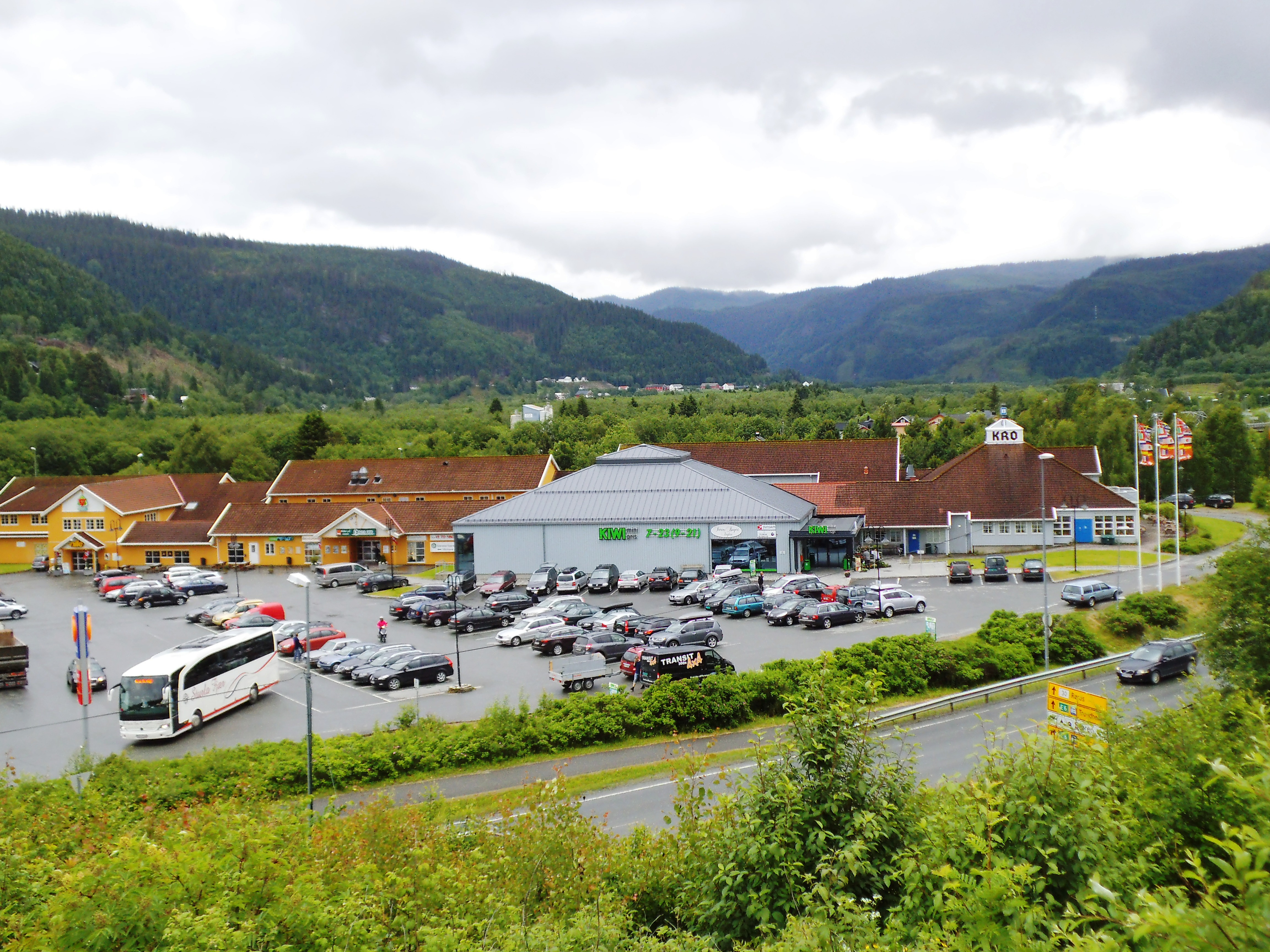
Støren village

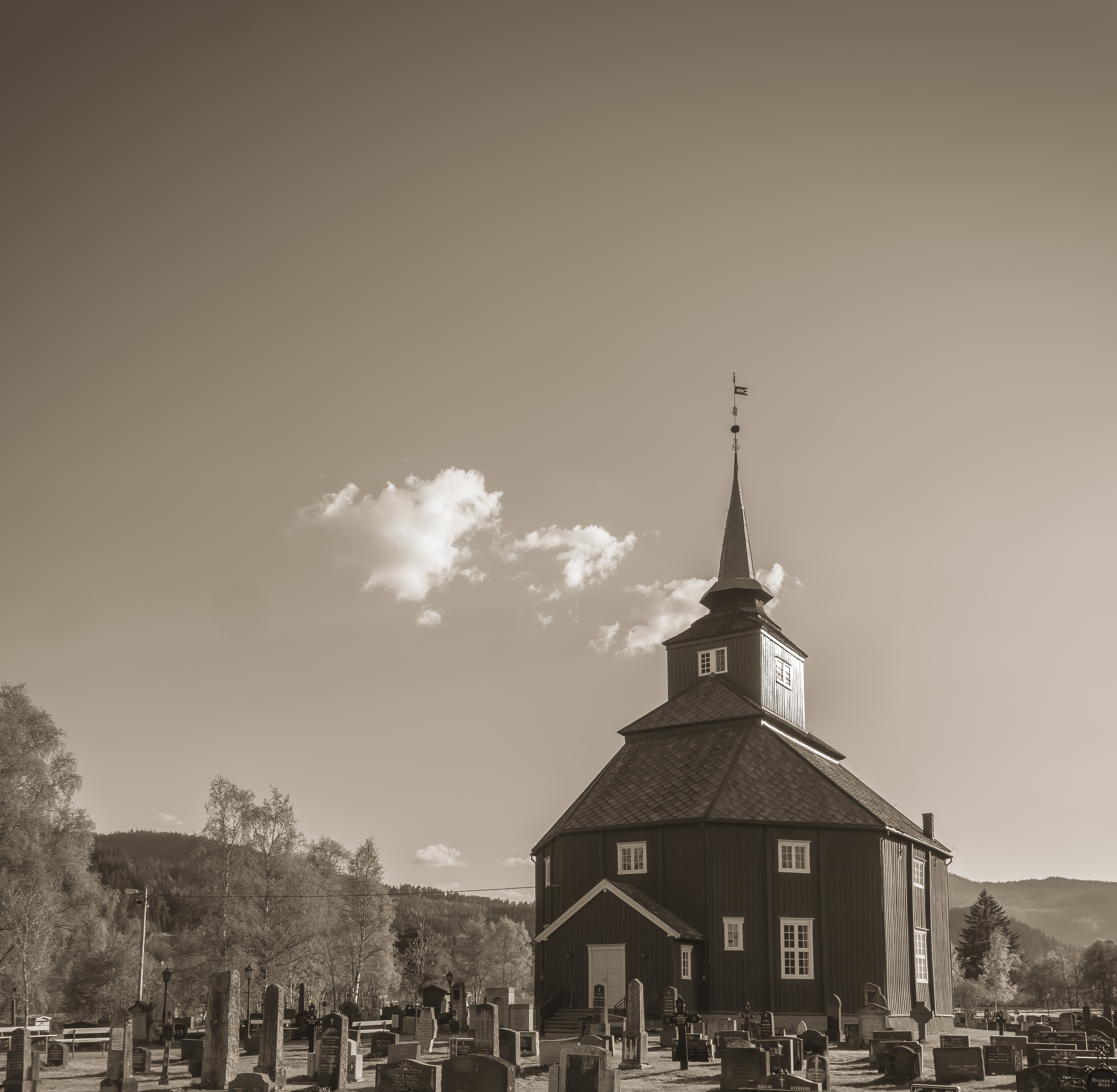
Støren Church

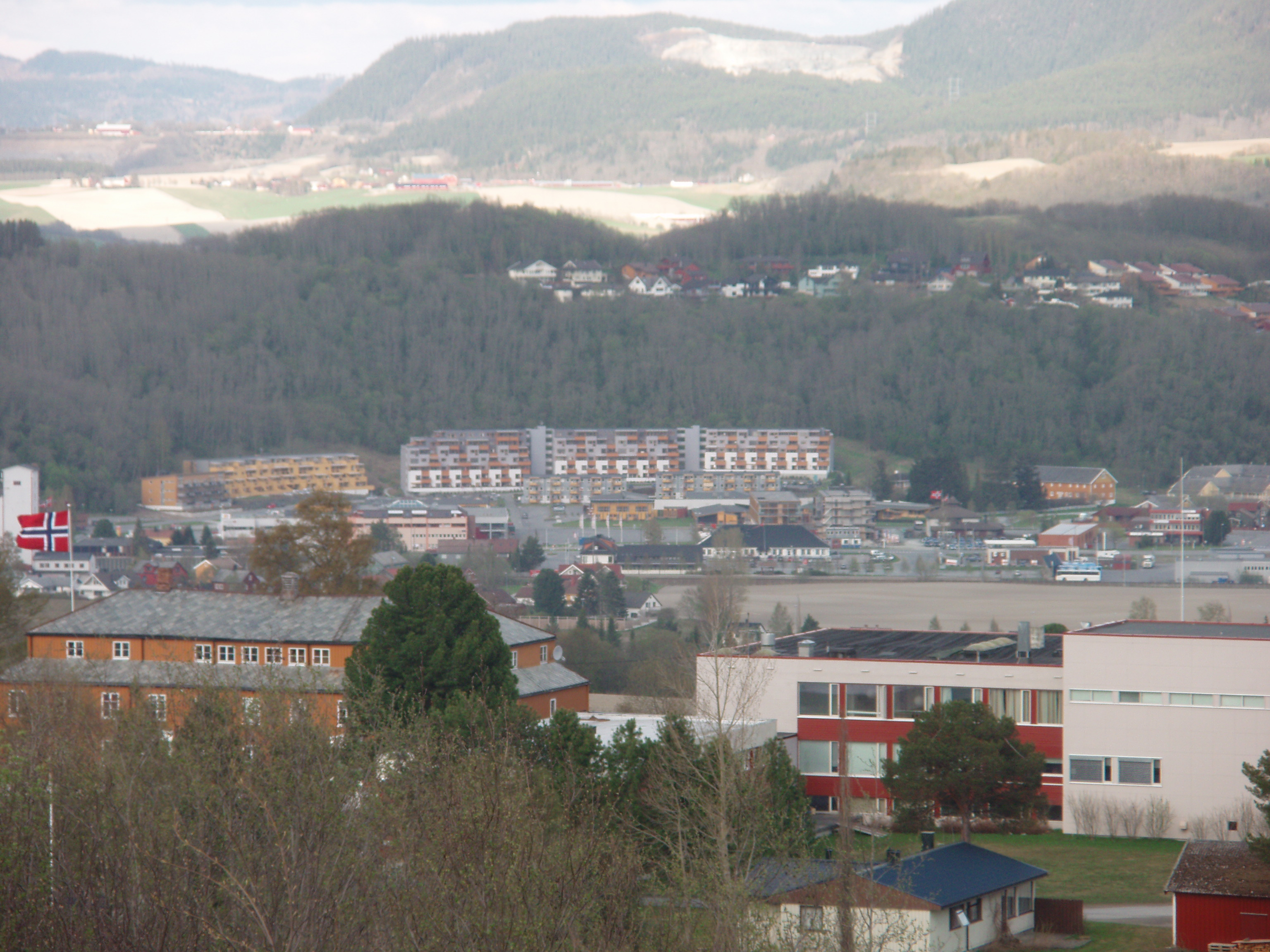
Melhus village
