= Storen =

Storen or Støren may refer to:

== Places in Norway ==
- Støren, a village in Midtre Gauldal Municipality in Trøndelag county
- Støren Municipality, a former municipality in the old Sør-Trøndelag county
- Støren Station, a railway station in Midtre Gauldal Municipality in Trøndelag county
- Støren Church, a church in Midtre Gauldal Municipality in Trøndelag county
- Storen or Store Skagastølstind, the third-highest peak in Norway

== Other uses ==
- Storen (surname), a list of people with this surname
- Danish gunboat Støren, a 19th century Danish vessel

== See also ==
- Matthew V. Storin (born 1942), American journalist and former editor of The Boston Globe
- Mattie Storin, a fictional character in the British television series House of Cards
- Staroń, a surname
- Storön, a Swedish island
