= Sogndal =

Sogndal, Sokndal, or Soknedal are similarly sounding Norwegian place names. They may refer to:

== Places ==
=== Norway ===
==== Rogaland county ====
- Sokndal Municipality, a municipality in Rogaland county (historically spelled Sogndal)
- Sogndal Municipality (Rogaland), a former municipality in Rogaland county
- Sogndalsstranda, a small seaport in Sokndal Municipality in Rogaland county (historically spelled Sogndal)
- Sokndal Church, a church in Sokndal Municipality in Rogaland county

==== Trøndelag county ====
- Soknedal, a village in Midtre Gauldal Municipality in Trøndelag county
- Soknedal Municipality, a former municipality in Trøndelag county (historically spelled Soknedalen or Sognedalen)
- Soknedal Church, a church in Midtre Gauldal municipality in Trøndelag county

==== Vestland county ====
- Sogndal, or Sogndalsfjøra, an urban area within Sogndal Municipality in Vestland county
- Sogndal Municipality, a municipality in Vestland county
- Sogndal Airport, Haukåsen, an airport in Sogndal municipality in Vestland county
- Sogndal Folk High School, a folk high school in Sogndal municipality in Vestland county

== Other uses ==
- Sogndal Fotball, an association football team in Sogndal municipality in Sogn og Fjordane county, Norway
- Sogndal IL, a Norwegian alliance sports club from Sogndalsfjøra, Sogn og Fjordane county, Norway
