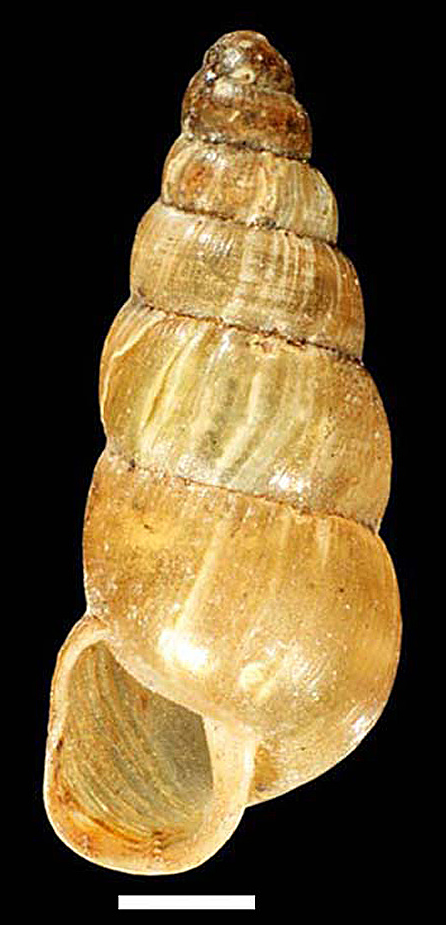
- Apertural view; scale bar 1 mm.

Conservation status
- Least Concern (IUCN 3.1)

Scientific classification
- Kingdom: Animalia
- Phylum: Mollusca
- Class: Gastropoda
- Order: Stylommatophora
- Family: Clausiliidae
- Genus: Balea
- Species: B. sarsii

Binomial name
- Balea sarsii Pfeiffer, 1847

Synonyms
- Balea heydeni von Maltzan, 1881; Balia lucifuga Bourguignat, 1857

= Balea sarsii =

Species of gastropod

Balea sarsii is a species of air-breathing land snail, a terrestrial pulmonate gastropod mollusk in the family Clausiliidae. It remains disputed whether B. sarsii or Balea heydeni von Maltzan, 1881 is the correct name.

The species had long been overlooked because of confusion with Balea perversa.

== Taxonomy ==
At the beginning of the 21st century it was realised by Hartmut Nordsieck and Theo Ripken that populations of Balea from Portugal were of two morphological types. One species was the widespread Balea perversa and for the other they disinterred an old name Balea heydeni von Maltzan, 1881, originally described from Portugal. Shortly afterwards another clue came from a DNA sequence from a British sample of Balea, which was distinct from sequences from elsewhere in mainland Europe and closer to a species from the Azores. In 2006, information was collated by Gittenberger et al., who designated a lectotype for B. heydeni, now in the Paris museum.

However, in 2010 von Proschwitz argued that a species described in 1847 from Norway, Balea sarsii, was the same as B. heydeni and that the former name should be used because it is the older. The evidence was that this species was found at the implied type locality of B. sarsii (Florø in Sogn og Fjordane County), where M. Sars has been supposed to have collected the specimens used in the species description. Subsequently, Bank argued that the original B. sarsii could just as easily have been B. perversa, which is much commoner in Norway. "Norway" was the only explicit specification of the type locality in the species description. In that case B. sarsii would be a junior synonym of B. perversa, and the other species should be called B. heydeni.

The dispute is unresolved: for instance Welter-Schultes' identification guide uses B. sarsii, but MolluscaBase prefers B. heydeni, as does the 2020 British List.

Bank also argued why the name Balea lucifuga applies to B. perversa, even though Bourguignat was applying it to B. sarsii when he made the name available in 1857. Welter-Schultes has disagreed, implying that the name B. lucifuga would have priority over B. heydeni if B. sarsii were rejected.

The specific name sarsii honours Norwegian biologist Michael Sars. The name heydeni commemorates the German naturalist Lucas Friedrich Julius Dominikus von Heyden.

== Distribution ==
This species is known to occur in:

- Portugal both mainland and the Atlantic Islands
- northwestern and northern coastal regions of Spain
- coastal parts of France
- coastal parts of Belgium
- coastal parts of the Netherlands
- Great Britain
- Ireland
- one coastal site in Denmark: Møns Klint
- west coast of Sweden
- Norway: Hordaland County and Sogn og Fjordane County

Balea sarsii has an Atlantic distribution. In Britain and Ireland it is the commoner of the two Balea species, occurring also inland. A 2010 revision of Balea material from Sweden and Norway revealed two localities for B. sarsii from the Swedish west coast (the Island of Vinga outside Göteborg and the island Storön in the archipelago of Väderöarna in the province of Bohuslän). The species is known from six Norwegian localities, of which five are situated in Hordaland County. It is considered a very rare species in Norway, because only sixteen Norwegian specimens have been found, among thousands of B. perversa.

The type locality of B. sarsii has been inferred to be Florø in Sogn og Fjordane County, the former home of M. Sars, who provided the specimens used in the species description. However, Sars had left Florø seven years before Pfeiffer published his description. This states explicitly only Norway as the locality. Florø is the northernmost known locality of B. sarsii.

If the correct name for this species is considered to be B. heydeni, the type locality is Sintra in Portugal, following the designation of a lectotype from that locality.

== Description ==
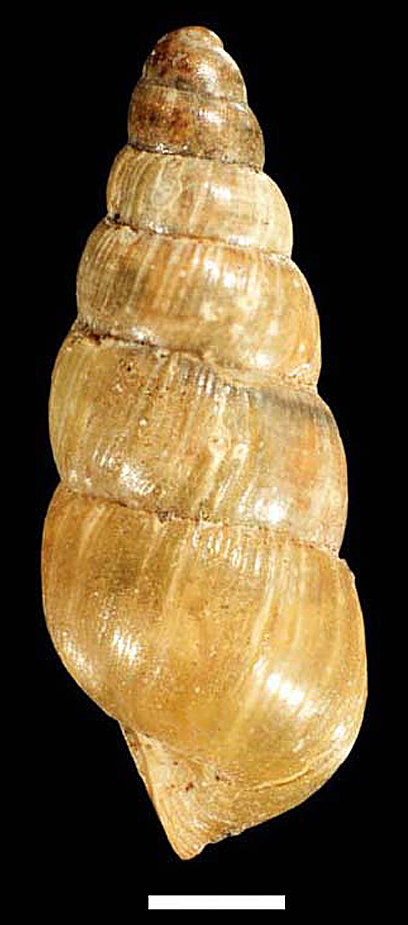
Lateral view; scale bar 1 mm.

Like with most other species in the family Clausiliidae, the shells of Balea species are sinistral (left-handed) in their coiling and much taller than wide. At first glance, adult B. sarsii look like juveniles of some other clausiliid species, because this species lacks the prominent apertural structures that typically develop in clausiliid adults.

The most reliable distinction from B. perversa is that the first whorls of B. sarsii increase in diameter more rapidly, so that the appearance is conical, whereas these whorls in B. perversa are more like a cylinder. The shell of B. sarsii is broader and yellowish rather than darker brownish. The shell surface sculpture has wrinkled coarse growth lines rather than the finer and more regular riblets in B. perversa. A weak, parietal denticle may be present in B. perversa, but not in B. sarsii.

== Ecology ==
Balea sarsii sometimes co-occurs with B. perversa. Such syntopic occurrences are not uncommon in various parts of the distribution area, and probably both species have very similar ecologies. Balea species are rarely found on the ground, but rather on tree trunks and rocks; they are typically found in the crevices of bark. They eat lichens, a consequence of which is that air pollution seems to have caused a range reduction in Britain.
