= Storo (disambiguation) =

Storo is a commune in Trento, Italy.

Storo may also refer to:

- Storo (Greenland), an island in Greenland
- Storo, Norway, a neighborhood in Oslo, Norway
  - Storo station
- MV Storo, a Swedish tanker 1956–59, earlier MV Kollbjørg

== See also ==
- Storön, name of a number of islands in Sweden
