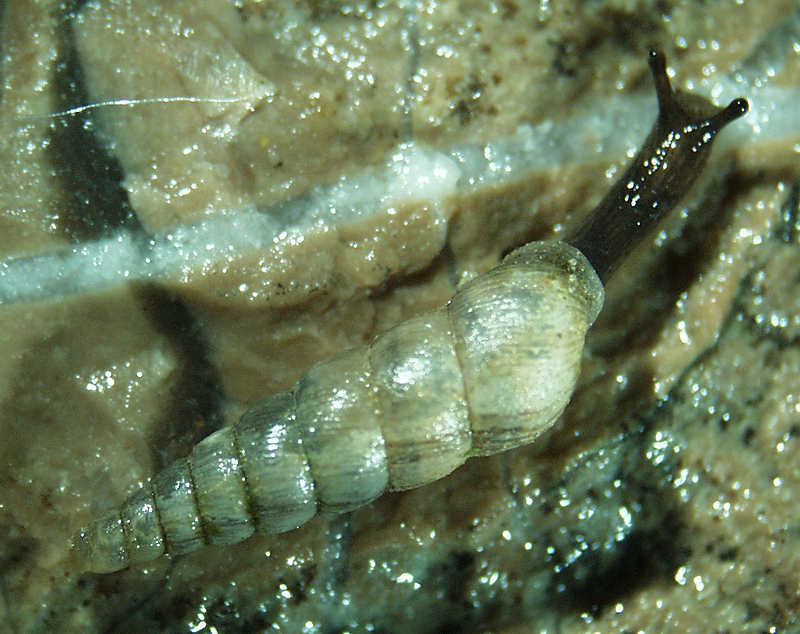
- live Balea perversa

Scientific classification
- Domain: Eukaryota
- Kingdom: Animalia
- Phylum: Mollusca
- Class: Gastropoda
- Order: Stylommatophora
- Family: Clausiliidae
- Subfamily: Baleinae
- Genus: Balea; Gray, 1824

= Balea =

Genus of gastropods

Balea is a genus of small, very elongate, air-breathing land snails, sinistral terrestrial pulmonate gastropod mollusks in the family Clausiliidae, the door snails.

Balea is the type genus of the subfamily Baleinae.

== Species ==
Species within this genus include:

- Balea biplicata (Montague, 1803) – synonym: Alinda biplicata
- Balea fallax (Rossmässler, 1836)
- Balea jugularis (Vest, 1859)
- Balea kaeufeli (Brandt, 1962)
- Balea nitida Mousson, 1858
- Balea nordsiecki Dedov & Neubert, 2002
- Balea pancici Pavlović, 1912
- Balea perversa (Linnaeus, 1758) – the type species of the genus
- Balea sarsii Pfeiffer, 1847 - synonym: Balea heydeni von Maltzan, 1881
- Balea serbica (Möllendorff, 1873)
- Balea stabilis (Pfeiffer, 1847)
- Balea viridana (Rossmässler, 1836)
- Balea vratzatica (Likharev, 1972)
- Balea wagneri (Wagner, 1911)
