= Soknedal Municipality =

Former municipality in Trøndelag, Norway

Soknedal Municipality Soknedal herred
- Former municipality
- Soknedalen herred (historic name)
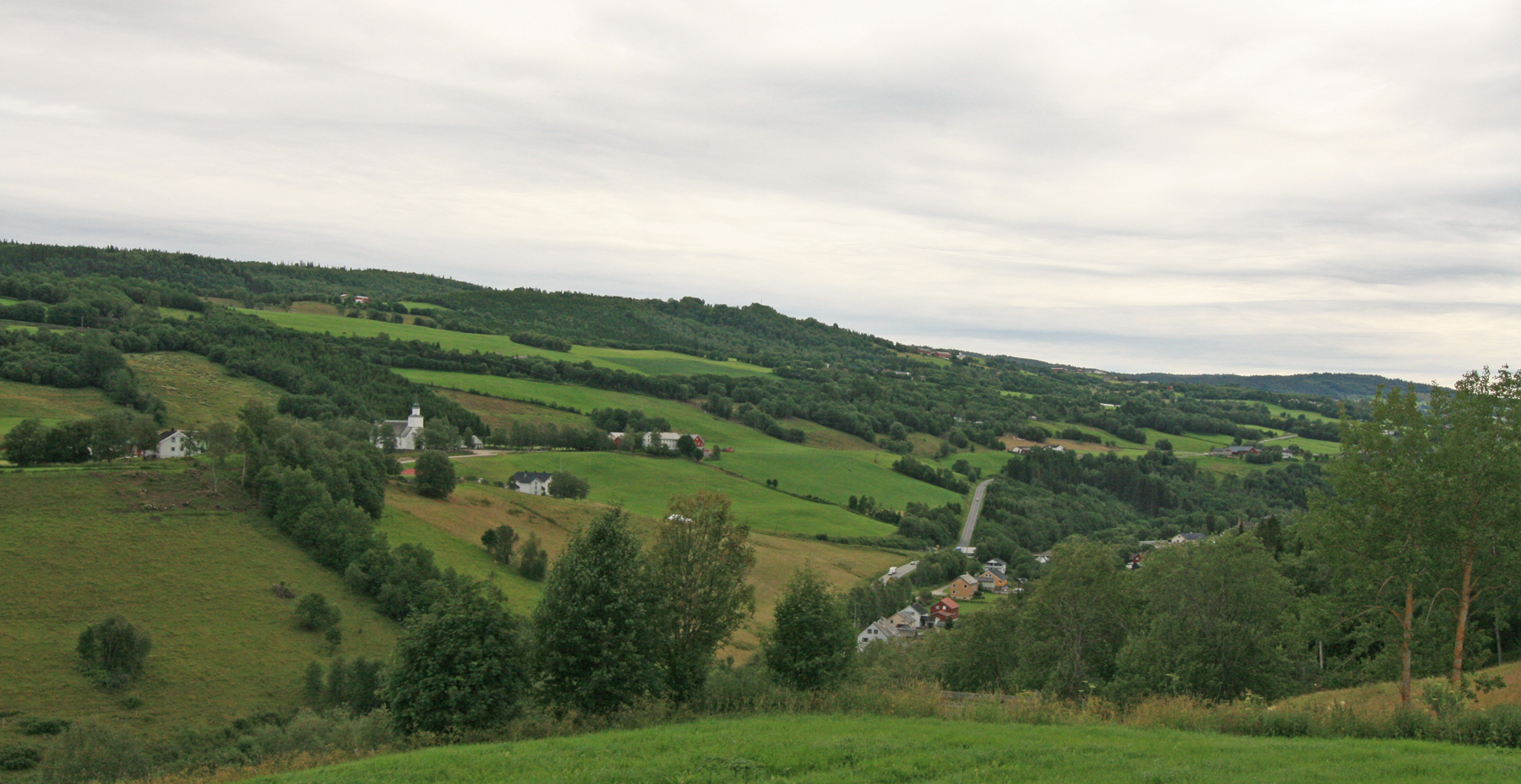
- View of the local church

- Sør-Trøndelag within Norway

- Soknedal within Sør-Trøndelag
- Coordinates: 62.9510°N 10.1881°E
- Country: Norway
- County: Sør-Trøndelag
- District: Gauldalen
- Established: 1841
  - Preceded by: Støren Municipality
- Disestablished: 1 Jan 1964
  - Succeeded by: Midtre Gauldal Municipality
- Administrative centre: Soknedal

Government
  - Mayor (1960–1963): Ola J. Ertshus (Sp)

Area (upon dissolution)
  - Total: 440.7 km^{2} (170.2 sq mi)
  - Rank: #223 in Norway
- Highest elevation: 1,258 m (4,127 ft)

Population (1963)
  - Total: 1,928
  - Rank: #450 in Norway
  - Density: 4.4/km^{2} (11/sq mi)
  - Change (10 years): ▼ −4.8%
- Demonym: Sokndaling

Official language
  - Norwegian form: Neutral
- Time zone: UTC+01:00 (CET)
  - Summer (DST): UTC+02:00 (CEST)
- ISO 3166 code: NO-1649

Soknedal is a former municipality in the old Sør-Trøndelag county, Norway. The 440.7-square-kilometre (170.2 sq mi) municipality existed from 1841 until its dissolution in 1964. It is located in the western part of what is now Midtre Gauldal Municipality in Trøndelag county. The administrative center of the municipality was the village of Soknedal, where the Soknedal Church is located. The municipality was named after the Soknedalen valley in which it is located. The valley is named after the river Sokna which runs through the valley.

Prior to its dissolution in 1964, the 440.7-square-kilometre (170.2 sq mi) municipality was the 223rd largest by area out of the 689 municipalities in Norway. Soknedal Municipality was the 450th most populous municipality in Norway with a population of about 1,928. The municipality's population density was 4.4 inhabitants per square kilometre (11/sq mi) and its population had decreased by 4.8% over the previous 10-year period.

== General information ==
The municipality of Soknedal was established in 1841 when the old Støren Municipality was split into three separate municipalities: Horg Municipality (in the north), Støren Municipality (in the central part), and Soknedal Municipality (in the southwest). Initially, Soknedal Municipality had 1,966 residents. During the 1960s, there were many municipal mergers across Norway due to the work of the Schei Committee. On 1 January 1964, a municipal merger took place: Budal Municipality (population: 529), Singsås Municipality (population: 1,554), Soknedal Municipality (population: 1,916), and Støren Municipality (population: 2,296) were all merged to form the new Midtre Gauldal Municipality.

=== Name ===
The municipality (originally the parish) is named Soknedal (Old Norse: Sóknardalr) after the valley in which it is located. The first element comes from the name of the river Sokna which flows through the valley. The river name comes from the word sœkja which means "to suck" or "to attack", likely referring to the rough waters of the river. The last element is dalr which means "valley" or "dale". Historically, the name of the municipality was spelled Soknedalen. On 3 November 1917, a royal resolution changed the spelling of the name of the municipality to Soknedal, removing the definite form ending -en.

=== Churches ===
The Church of Norway had one parish (sokn) within Soknedal Municipality. At the time of the municipal dissolution, it was part of the Støren prestegjeld and the Gauldal prosti (deanery) in the Diocese of Nidaros.

Churches in Soknedal Municipality
Parish (sokn)	Church name	Location of the church	Year built
Soknedal	Soknedal Church	Soknedal	1933

== Geography ==
The municipality was located in the Gauldal valley. Budal Municipality was located to the southeast, Støren Municipality was to the northeast, Horg Municipality was to the north, Meldal Municipality to the northwest, Rennebu Municipality was to the southwest, and Kvikne Municipality (in Hedmark county) was to the south. The highest point in the municipality was the 1,258-metre (4,127 ft) tall mountain Sandfjellet which sits on the border with Kvikne Municipality.

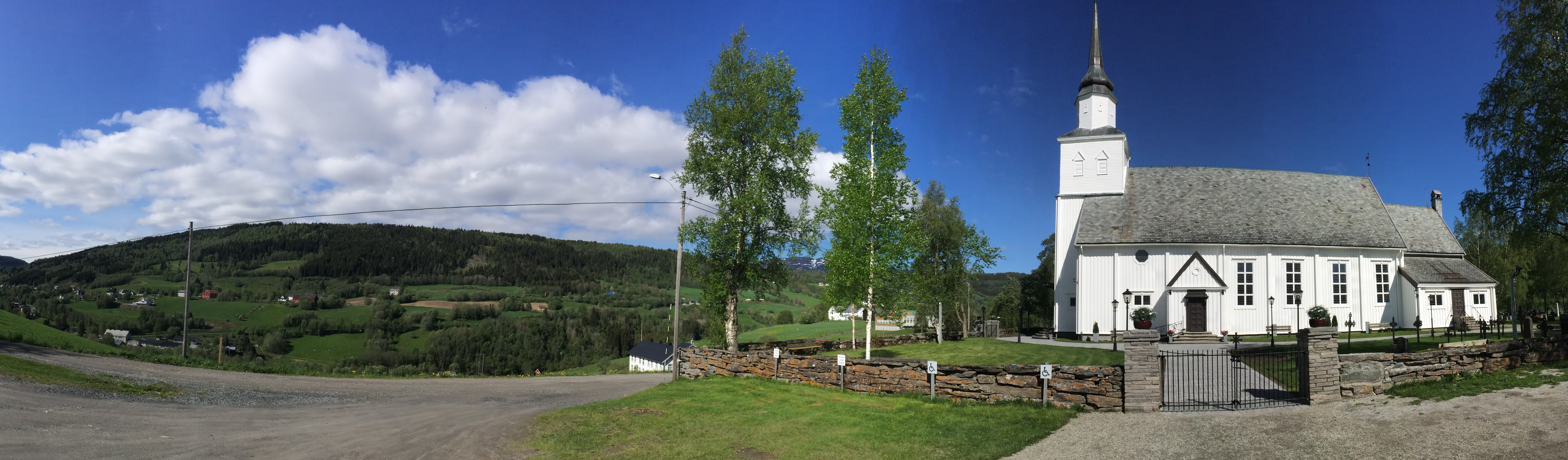
Landscape surrounding Soknedal Church

== Government ==
While it existed, Soknedal Municipality was responsible for primary education (through 10th grade), outpatient health services, senior citizen services, welfare and other social services, zoning, economic development, and municipal roads and utilities. The municipality was governed by a municipal council of directly elected representatives. The mayor was indirectly elected by a vote of the municipal council. The municipality was under the jurisdiction of the Frostating Court of Appeal.

=== Municipal council ===
The municipal council (Herredsstyre) of Soknedal Municipality was made up of 17 representatives that were elected to four year terms. The tables below show the historical composition of the council by political party.

Soknedal herredsstyre 1959–1963
Party name (in Norwegian)	Number of representatives
Labour Party (Arbeiderpartiet)	4
Christian Democratic Party (Kristelig Folkeparti)	4
Centre Party (Senterpartiet)	6
Liberal Party (Venstre)	3
Total number of members:	17

Soknedal herredsstyre 1955–1959
Party name (in Norwegian)	Number of representatives
Labour Party (Arbeiderpartiet)	5
Christian Democratic Party (Kristelig Folkeparti)	3
Farmers' Party (Bondepartiet)	6
Liberal Party (Venstre)	3
Total number of members:	17

Soknedal herredsstyre 1951–1955
Party name (in Norwegian)	Number of representatives
Labour Party (Arbeiderpartiet)	4
Christian Democratic Party (Kristelig Folkeparti)	4
Farmers' Party (Bondepartiet)	5
Liberal Party (Venstre)	3
Total number of members:	16

Soknedal herredsstyre 1947–1951
Party name (in Norwegian)	Number of representatives
Labour Party (Arbeiderpartiet)	4
Christian Democratic Party (Kristelig Folkeparti)	3
Farmers' Party (Bondepartiet)	6
Liberal Party (Venstre)	3
Total number of members:	16

Soknedal herredsstyre 1945–1947
Party name (in Norwegian)	Number of representatives
Labour Party (Arbeiderpartiet)	5
Christian Democratic Party (Kristelig Folkeparti)	3
Farmers' Party (Bondepartiet)	5
Liberal Party (Venstre)	3
Total number of members:	16

Soknedal herredsstyre 1937–1941*
Party name (in Norwegian)	Number of representatives
Labour Party (Arbeiderpartiet)	5
Farmers' Party (Bondepartiet)	7
Liberal Party (Venstre)	4
Total number of members:	16
Note: Due to the German occupation of Norway during World War II, no elections were held for new municipal councils until after the war ended in 1945.

=== Mayors ===
The mayor (Norwegian: ordfører) of Soknedal Municipality was the political leader of the municipality and the chairperson of the municipal council. Here is a list of people who held this position:

- 1841–1841: Anfind Olsen Ertshus
- 1842–1843: Jens Sivertsen Hov
- 1844–1845: Anders Olsen Ertshus
- 1846–1847: Endre Arntsen Bræk
- 1848–1851: Jens Sivertsen Hov
- 1852–1855: Anders Olsen Ertshus
- 1856–1859: Endre Arntsen Bræk
- 1860–1863: Anfind Olsen Ertshus
- 1864–1865: Ole Ingebrigtsen Reitan
- 1866–1869: Erik Haldosen Aasenhus
- 1870–1877: Ole Ingebrigtsen Reitan
- 1878–1881: Nils Olsen Garli
- 1882–1885: Ole Ingebrigtsen Reitan (H)
- 1886–1889: Ole Anfindsen Ertshus
- 1890–1898: Ole Ingebrigtsen Reitan (H)
- 1899–1904: Ole Johnsen Østhus (V)
- 1905–1907: Ole Johnsen Aasenhus (H)
- 1908–1910: Arnt Estensen Solberg (V)
- 1911–1922: Ole Johnsen Østhus (V)
- 1923–1925: Jens Olsen Ertshus (Bp)
- 1926–1928: Ole Olsen Bjørnli (V)
- 1929–1931: Andreas Olsen Ertshus (Bp)
- 1932–1934: Ole Olsen Bjørnli (V)
- 1935–1937: Sivert Hansen Berg (Bp)
- 1938–1940: Nils Johnsen Fossum (Bp)
- 1941–1945: Sivert Hansen Berg (NS)
- 1946–1951: Nils Kristian Vagnild (Bp)
- 1952–1955: Nils Johnsen Fossum (Bp)
- 1956–1959: Ottar Hov (Bp)
- 1960–1963: Ola J. Ertshus (Sp)

== See also ==
- List of former municipalities of Norway
