= Støren Municipality =

Former municipality in Trøndelag, Norway

Støren Municipality Støren herred
- Former municipality
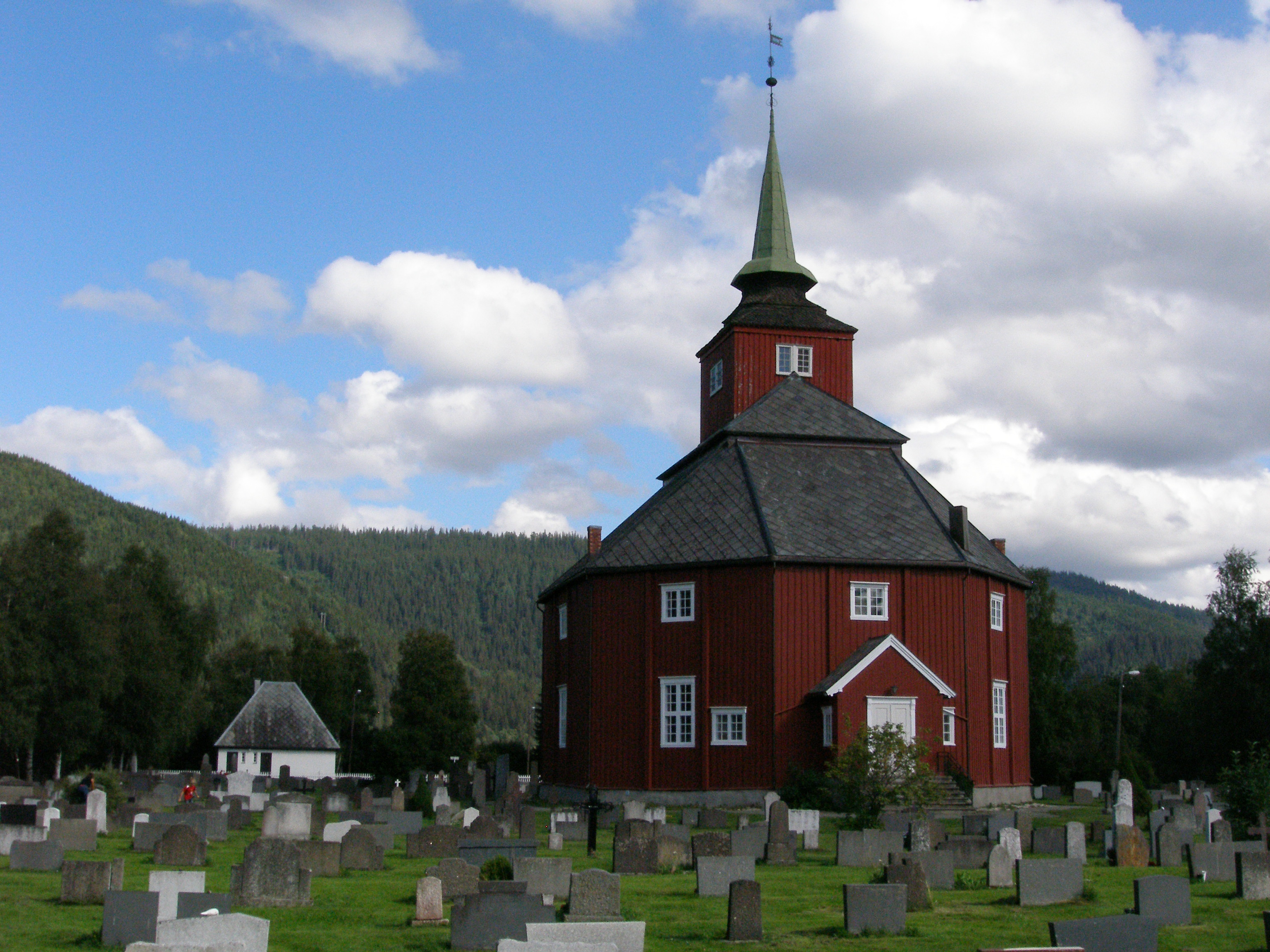
- View of the local church

- Sør-Trøndelag within Norway

- Støren within Sør-Trøndelag
- Coordinates: 63.0391°N 10.2851°E
- Country: Norway
- County: Sør-Trøndelag
- District: Gauldalen
- Established: 1 Jan 1838
  - Created as: Formannskapsdistrikt
- Disestablished: 1 Jan 1964
  - Succeeded by: Midtre Gauldal Municipality
- Administrative centre: Støren

Government
  - Mayor (1960–1963): Martin Øien (Ap)

Area (upon dissolution)
  - Total: 263.98 km^{2} (101.92 sq mi)
  - Rank: #308 in Norway
- Highest elevation: 766 m (2,513 ft)

Population (1963)
  - Total: 2,320
  - Rank: #388 in Norway
  - Density: 8.8/km^{2} (23/sq mi)
  - Change (10 years): ▼ −2.3%
- Demonym: Støresbygg

Official language
  - Norwegian form: Neutral
- Time zone: UTC+01:00 (CET)
  - Summer (DST): UTC+02:00 (CEST)
- ISO 3166 code: NO-1648

Støren is a former municipality in the old Sør-Trøndelag county, Norway. The 264-square-kilometre (102 sq mi) municipality existed from 1838 until its dissolution in 1964. The municipality was located in the north-central part of what is now Midtre Gauldal Municipality in Trøndelag county. The administrative center was the village of Støren where Støren Church is located.

Prior to its dissolution in 1964, the 264-square-kilometre (102 sq mi) municipality was the 308th largest by area out of the 689 municipalities in Norway. Støren Municipality was the 388th most populous municipality in Norway with a population of about 2,320. The municipality's population density was 8.8 inhabitants per square kilometre (23/sq mi) and its population had decreased by 2.3% over the previous 10-year period.

== General information ==
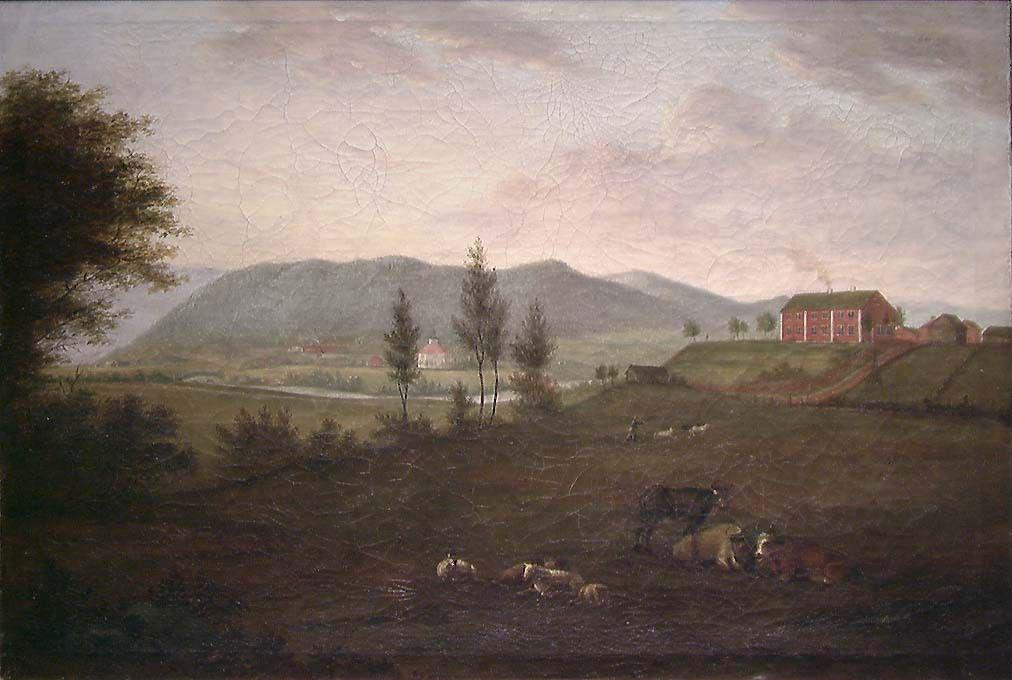
Painting of the Støren area in 1823

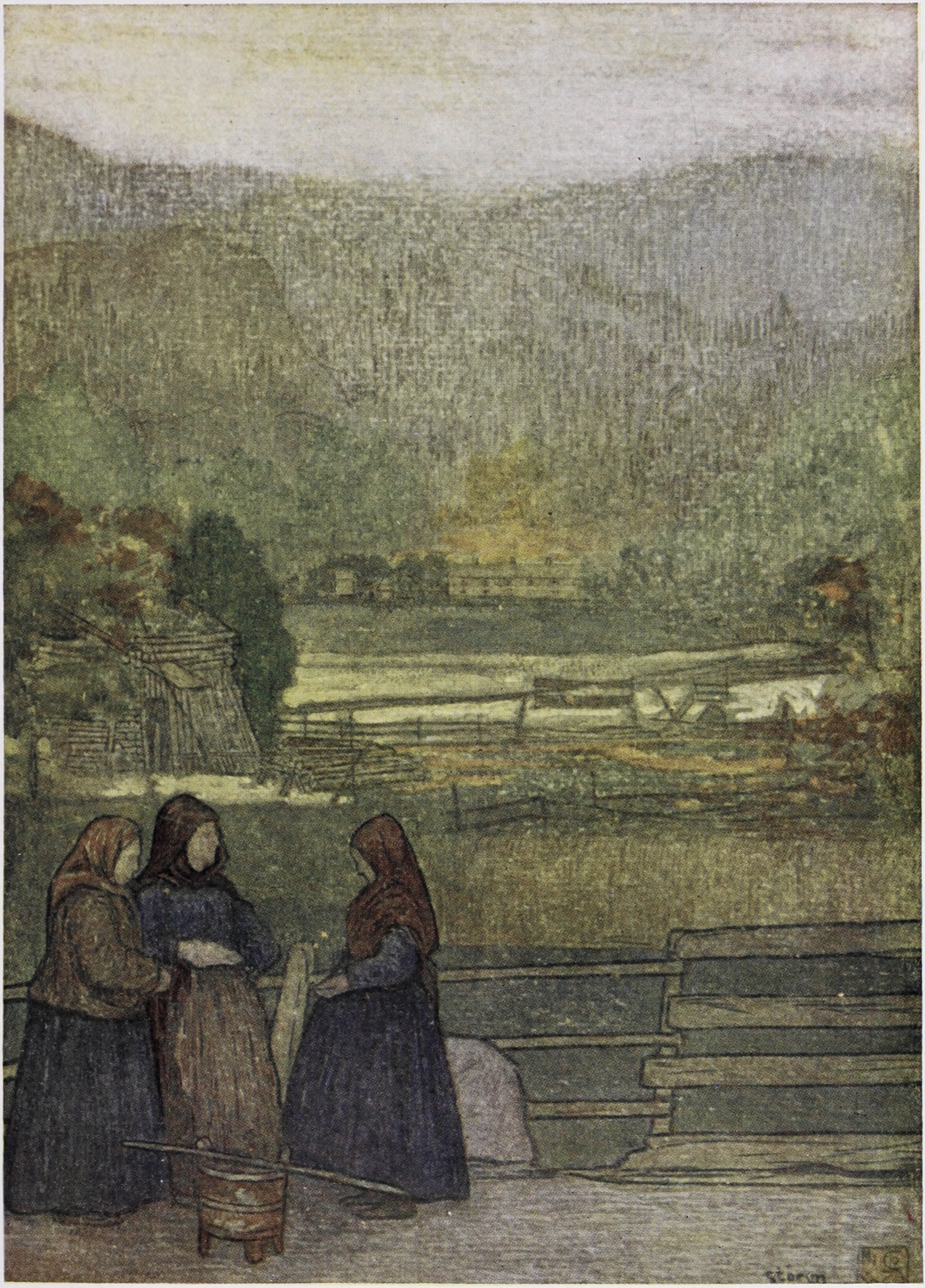
Painting of women selling berries by the road into Støren in 1905. Credit: Nico Jungman

The prestegjeld of Støren was established as a civil municipality on 1 January 1838 (see formannskapsdistrikt law). In 1841, the large municipality of Støren was divided into three municipalities: Horg Municipality in the north (population: 2,374), Støren Municipality in the east (population: 2,312), and Soknedal Municipality in the west (population: 1,966). In 1879, the southern part of Støren (population: 585) was separated to form the new Budal Municipality. This left Støren Municipality with 1,840 residents.

During the 1960s, there were many municipal mergers across Norway due to the work of the Schei Committee. On 1 January 1964, Budal Municipality (population: 529), Singsås Municipality (population: 1,554), Soknedal Municipality (population: 1,916), and Støren Municipality (population: 2,296) were all merged to form the new Midtre Gauldal Municipality.

=== Name ===
The municipality (originally the parish) is named after the old Støren farm (Old Norse: Staurin) since the first Støren Church was built there. The first element is staurr which means "pole" or "stake". The word staurr is probably referring to the pointed headland on which the church is located. The two rivers that form this headland are the Gaula and Sokna. The last element is vin which means "meadow" or "pasture".

=== Churches ===
The Church of Norway had one parish (sokn) within Støren Municipality. At the time of the municipal dissolution, it was part of the Støren prestegjeld and the Gauldal prosti (deanery) in the Diocese of Nidaros.

Churches in Støren Municipality
Parish (sokn)	Church name	Location of the church	Year built
Støren	Støren Church	Støren	1817

== Geography ==
The municipality is located in the Gauldalen valley. Horg Municipality was to the north, Soknedal Municipality was to the west, Budal Municipality was to the south, and Singsås Municipality was to the east. The highest point in the municipality was the 766-metre (2,513 ft) tall mountain Ytre Svartfjellknippen.

== Government ==
While it existed, Støren Municipality was responsible for primary education (through 10th grade), outpatient health services, senior citizen services, welfare and other social services, zoning, economic development, and municipal roads and utilities. The municipality was governed by a municipal council of directly elected representatives. The mayor was indirectly elected by a vote of the municipal council. The municipality was under the jurisdiction of the Frostating Court of Appeal.

=== Municipal council ===
The municipal council (Herredsstyre) of Støren Municipality was made up of 17 representatives that were elected to four year terms. The tables below show the historical composition of the council by political party.

Støren herredsstyre 1959–1963
Party name (in Norwegian)	Number of representatives
Labour Party (Arbeiderpartiet)	12
Conservative Party (Høyre)	2
Centre Party (Senterpartiet)	2
Liberal Party (Venstre)	1
Total number of members:	17

Støren herredsstyre 1955–1959
Party name (in Norwegian)	Number of representatives
Labour Party (Arbeiderpartiet)	12
Farmers' Party (Bondepartiet)	3
Liberal Party (Venstre)	1
Local List(s) (Lokale lister)	1
Total number of members:	17

Støren herredsstyre 1951–1955
Party name (in Norwegian)	Number of representatives
Labour Party (Arbeiderpartiet)	9
Communist Party (Kommunistiske Parti)	1
Christian Democratic Party (Kristelig Folkeparti)	1
Farmers' Party (Bondepartiet)	3
Liberal Party (Venstre)	1
Local List(s) (Lokale lister)	1
Total number of members:	16

Støren herredsstyre 1947–1951
Party name (in Norwegian)	Number of representatives
Labour Party (Arbeiderpartiet)	10
Communist Party (Kommunistiske Parti)	1
Christian Democratic Party (Kristelig Folkeparti)	1
Farmers' Party (Bondepartiet)	3
Liberal Party (Venstre)	1
Total number of members:	16

Støren herredsstyre 1945–1947
Party name (in Norwegian)	Number of representatives
Labour Party (Arbeiderpartiet)	10
Communist Party (Kommunistiske Parti)	1
Christian Democratic Party (Kristelig Folkeparti)	1
Joint List(s) of Non-Socialist Parties (Borgerlige Felleslister)	4
Total number of members:	16

Støren herredsstyre 1937–1941*
Party name (in Norwegian)	Number of representatives
Labour Party (Arbeiderpartiet)	9
List of workers, fishermen, and small farmholders (Arbeidere, fiskere, småbrukere liste)	1
Joint List(s) of Non-Socialist Parties (Borgerlige Felleslister)	6
Total number of members:	16
Note: Due to the German occupation of Norway during World War II, no elections were held for new municipal councils until after the war ended in 1945.

=== Mayors ===
The mayor (Norwegian: ordfører) of Støren Municipality was the political leader of the municipality and the chairperson of the municipal council. Here is a list of people who held this position:

- 1838–1839: Jon Angrimsen Folstad
- 1840–1843: Anders Dahle
- 1844–1847: Anders Olsen Amdal
- 1848–1849: Henrik Olsen Hugdal
- 1850–1853: Ole Olsen Refseth
- 1854–1855: Henrik Olsen Hugdal
- 1856–1859: Lars Arntsen Nordtømme
- 1860–1861: Rolf Olsen Hugdal
- 1862–1863: Ingebrigt Johnsen Rognes
- 1864–1871: Peder Olsen Bones
- 1872–1875: Andreas Lauritz Petersen
- 1876–1877: Ole Olsen Aune
- 1878–1880: Ole Johnsen Bjerke
- 1882–1889: Ole Olsen Aune
- 1890–1891: Peder Arntsen Rogstad
- 1892–1893: Anders Olsen Knudsen (H)
- 1894–1901: Ole Johnsen Bjerke (V)
- 1902–1907: Nils Larsen Bones (SmP)
- 1908–1910: Ole A. Knudsen
- 1911–1913: Sivert Andersen Mo
- 1914–1919: Martin Svebstad (Ap)
- 1920–1922: Anders J. Aune (Ap)
- 1923–1928: John B. Rogstad (Ap)
- 1929–1934: Johan Glein (Ap)
- 1935–1941: Jon Berg (Ap)
- 1941–1945: Eilif Folstad Gårdbruker NS[6]
- 1945–1959: Jon Berg (Ap)
- 1960–1963: Martin Øien (Ap)

== Media gallery ==
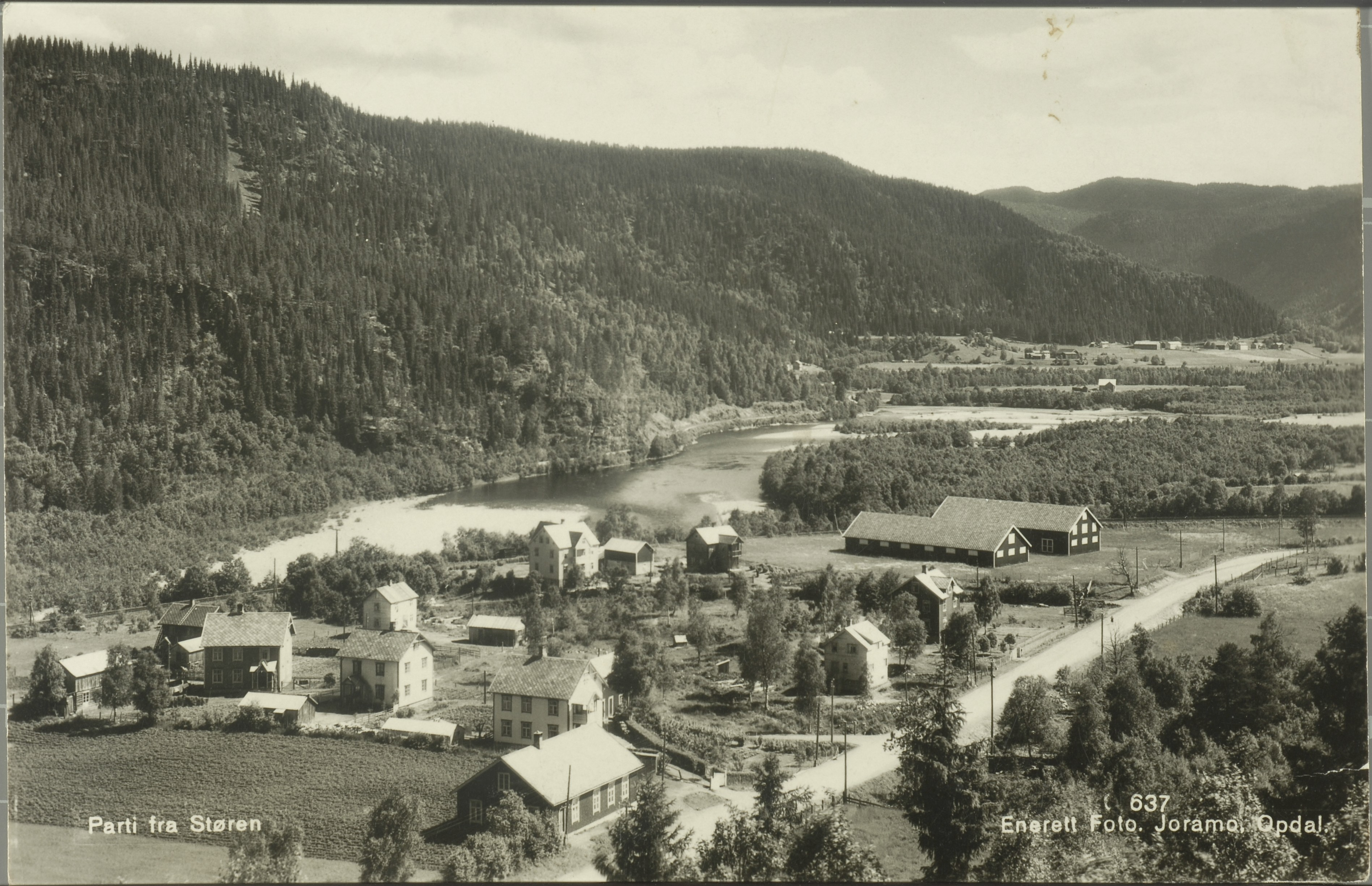
Village of Støren (c. 1930s)

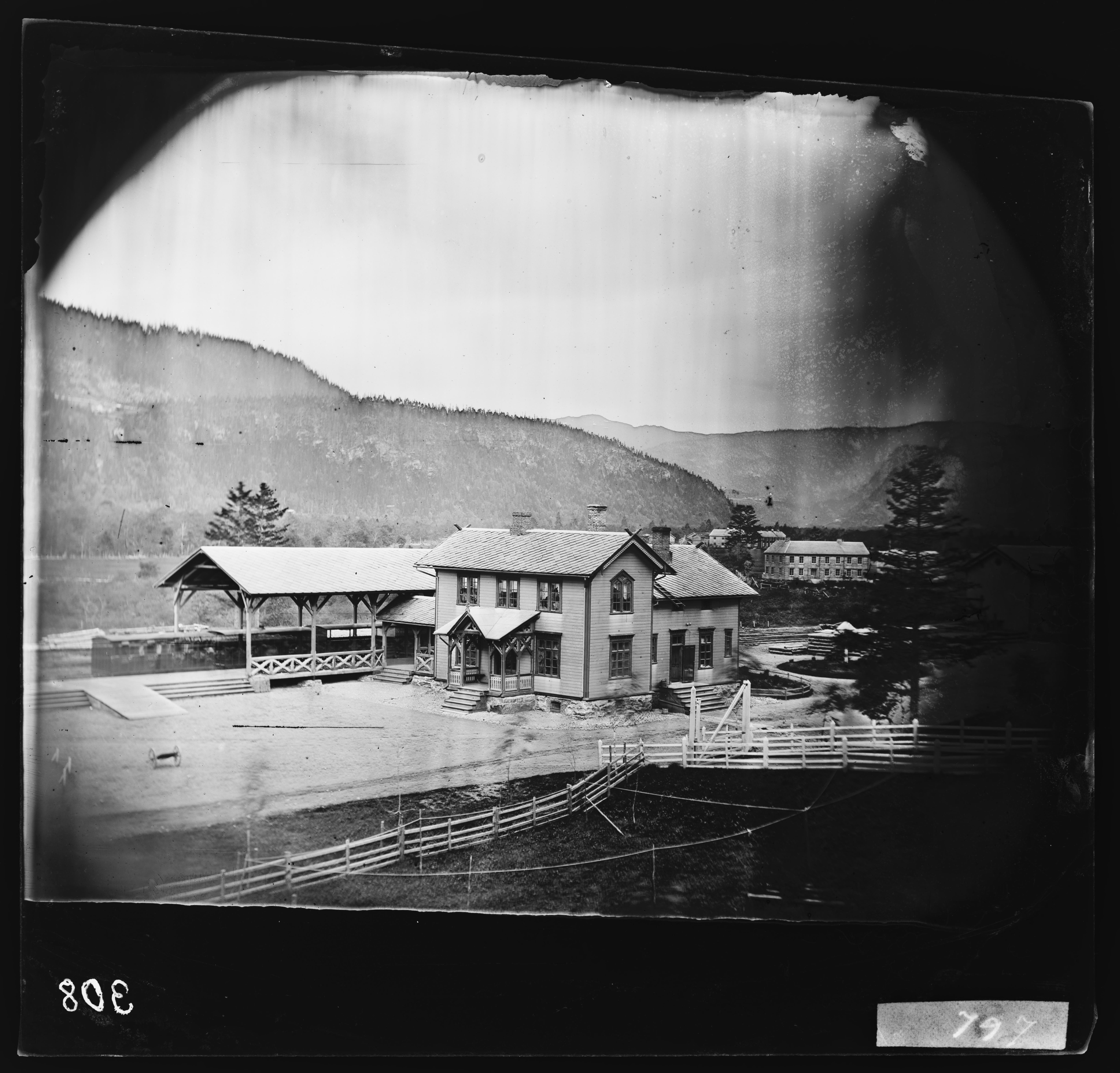
Støren Station

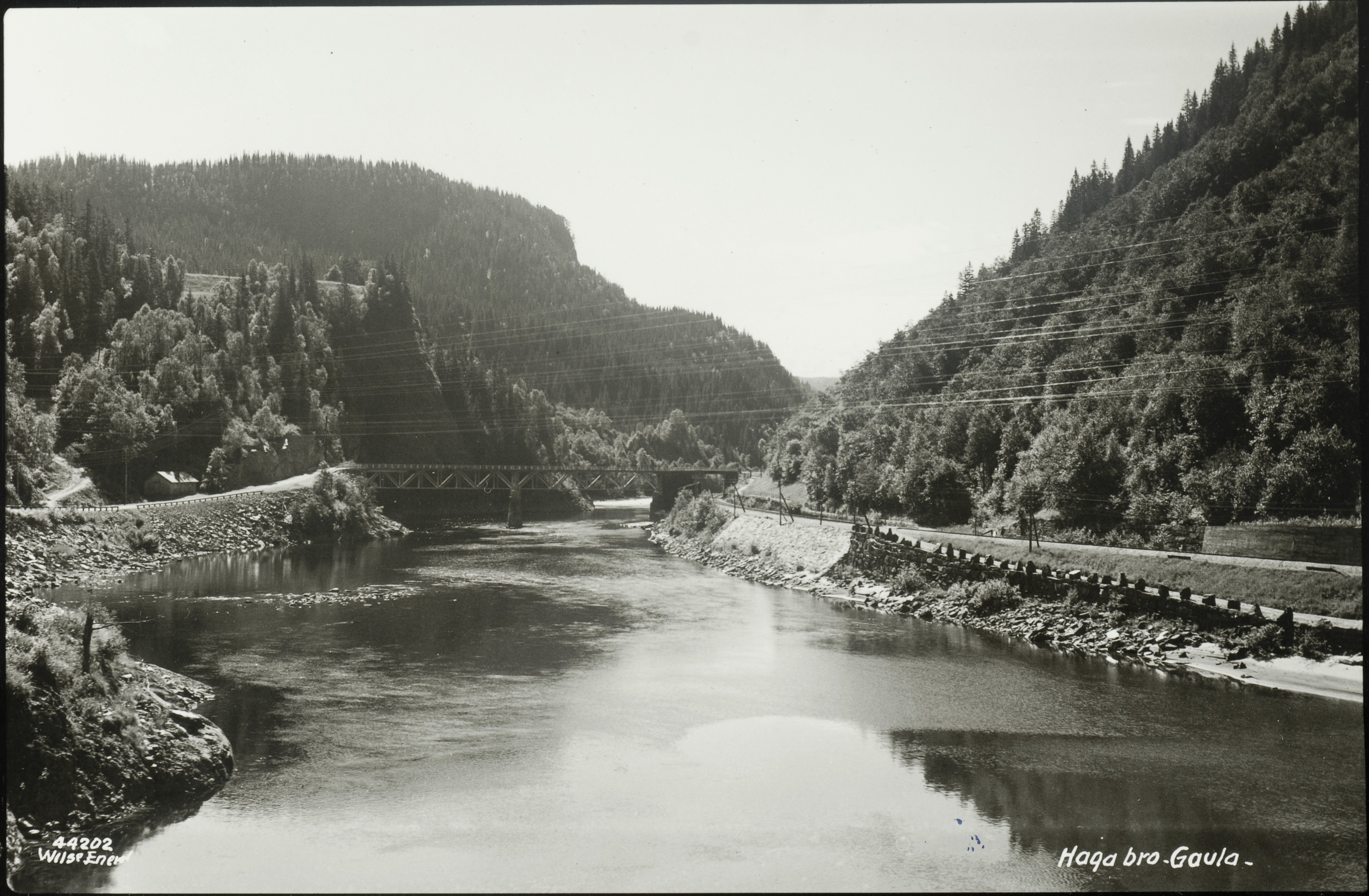
Haga Bridge in Støren

== See also ==
- List of former municipalities of Norway
