= Soknedal =

Village in Midtre Gauldal Municipality, Norway

- Village
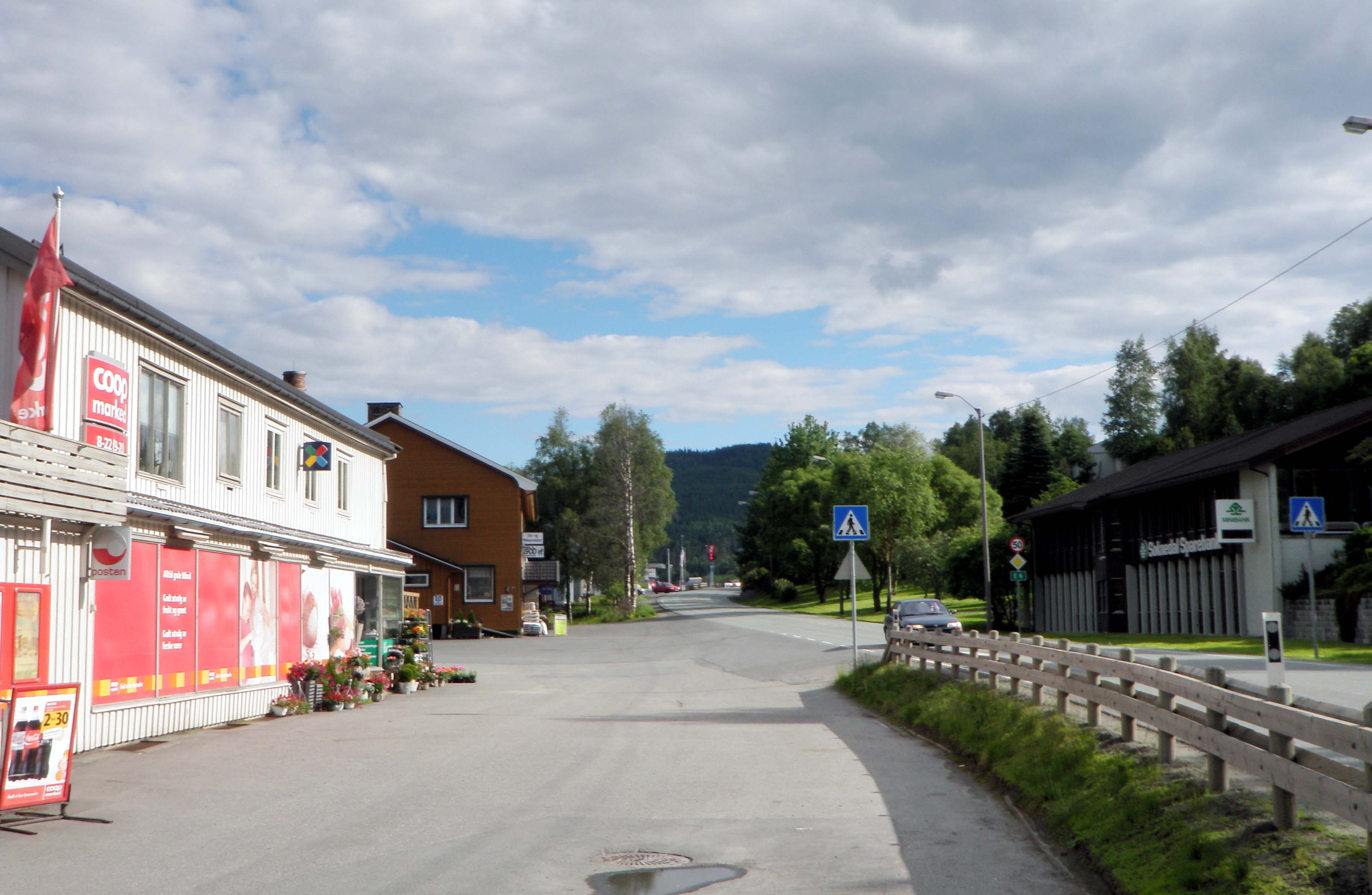
- View of the village
- Interactive map of Soknedal
- Location within Trøndelag Location within Norway
- Coordinates: 62.9510°N 10.1881°E
- Country: Norway
- Region: Central Norway
- County: Trøndelag
- District: Gauldalen
- Municipality: Midtre Gauldal Municipality

Area
  - Total: 0.34 km^{2} (0.13 sq mi)
- Elevation: 235 m (771 ft)

Population (2024)
  - Total: 289
  - Density: 850/km^{2} (2,200/sq mi)
- Time zone: UTC+01:00 (CET)
  - Summer (DST): UTC+02:00 (CEST)
- Post Code: 7288 Soknedal

Soknedal is a village in Midtre Gauldal Municipality in Trøndelag county, Norway. The village is located along the river Sokna which flows north and later joins the river Gaula. The Dovrebanen railway line and the European route E06 highway both run through the village, heading to the city of Trondheim which is about 60 kilometres (37 mi) to the north. The village of Støren lies about 12 kilometres (7.5 mi) to the north and the village of Berkåk lies about 16 kilometres (9.9 mi) to the south.

The 0.34-square-kilometre (84-acre) village has a population (2024) of 289 and a population density of 850 inhabitants per square kilometre (2,200/sq mi).

The village of Soknedal was the administrative centre of the old Soknedal Municipality which existed from 1841 until 1964. Soknedal Church is located in the village.

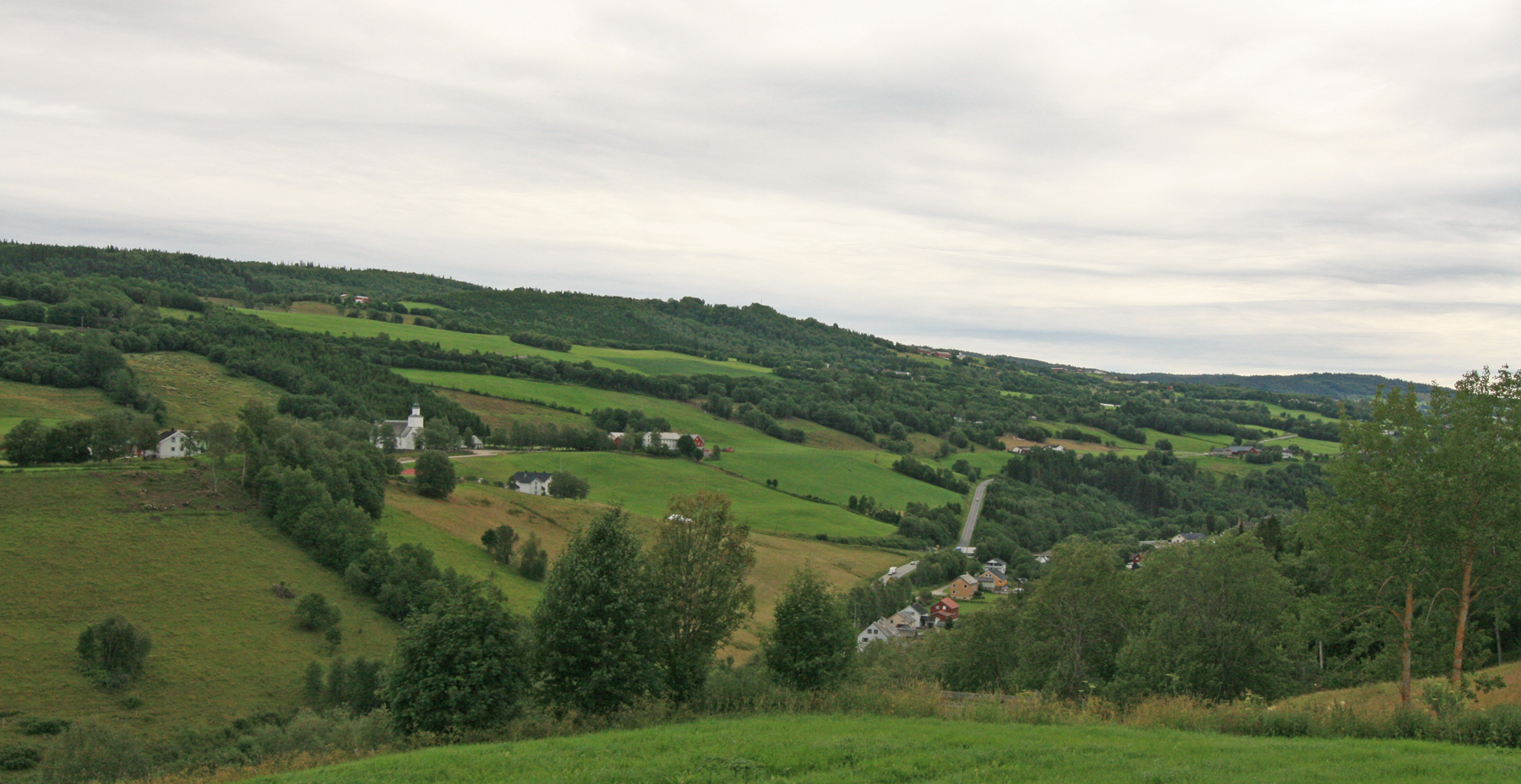
View of the Soknedal Church on the hill overlooking the village in the valley below
