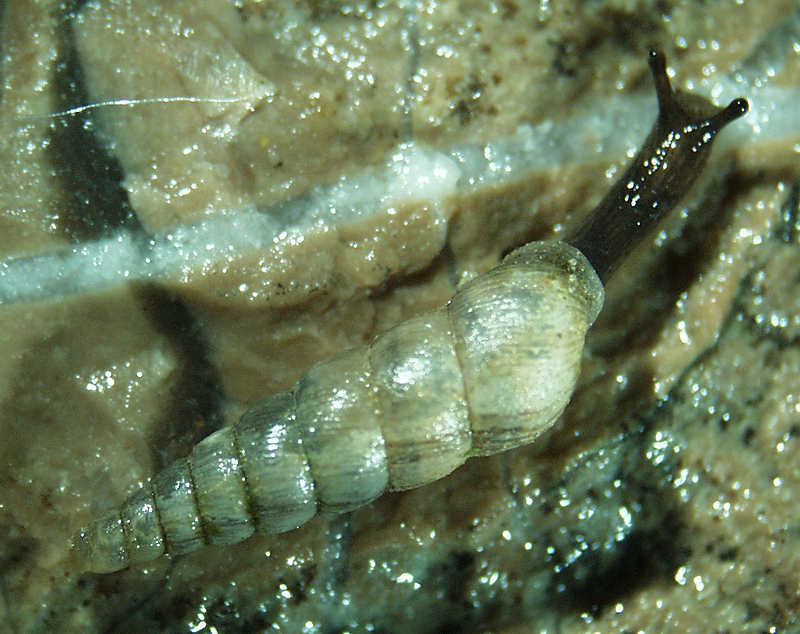
- live Balea perversa

Conservation status
- Least Concern (IUCN 3.1)

Scientific classification
- Kingdom: Animalia
- Phylum: Mollusca
- Class: Gastropoda
- Order: Stylommatophora
- Family: Clausiliidae
- Genus: Balea
- Species: B. perversa

Binomial name
- Balea perversa (Linnaeus, 1758)

Synonyms
- Turbo perversus Linnaeus, 1758; Pupa fragilis Draparnaud, 1801

= Balea perversa =

Species of gastropod

Balea perversa, also known as the wall snail or tree snail, is a species of air-breathing land snail, a terrestrial pulmonate gastropod mollusk in the family Clausiliidae, the door snails. The shell of this species is left-handed in coiling and it looks like a juvenile of a clausiliid.

Balea perversa (as its synonymous name Pupa fragilis) is the type species of the genus Balea.

== Distribution ==
Balea perversa is widely distributed in western and central Europe east to Ukraine and westernmost Russia:

- British Isles: Great Britain and Ireland
- Western Europe
- Switzerland – lower concern in Switzerland
- Portugal
- Germany – vulnerable in Germany, endangered in Bavaria
- Austria – vulnerable in Austria
- Czech Republic
- Slovakia
- on an islet near Estonia
- Sicilia
- Sardinia
- Iceland
- in Scandinavia only coastal above 62° N

It was referred from Crimea, but it was probably Mentissa gracilicosta.

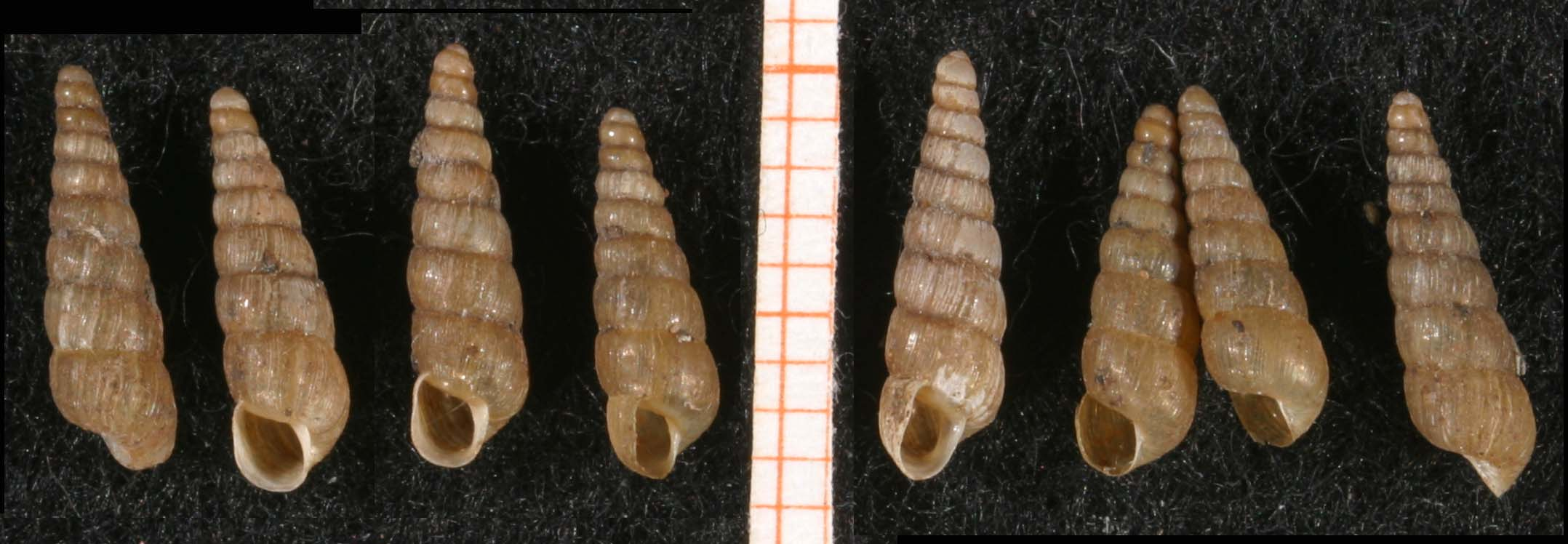
shells of Balea perversa

== Description ==
The shell is small and resembles that of a juvenile clausilid. The color is pale brownish and the surface is often silky shiny. The shell often has distinct riblets. The apical whorls are cylindrical. The shell has 8-9 whorls and (unlike many clausiliids) the last whorl has the largest diameter. It is densely ribbed. The cervix is almost without keel. Apart from a rudimentary parietal fold, there are no folds in the aperture. This species has no clausilium.

The width of the shell is 2.5–2.7 mm; the height of the shell is 7–10 mm.

Balea perversa differs from Balea sarsii in that it is a less slender and brownish rather than yellowish shell; the first whorl increases in diameter less rapidly, and the sculpture is more prominently striated (with what are usually distinct riblets rather than coarse growth lines).

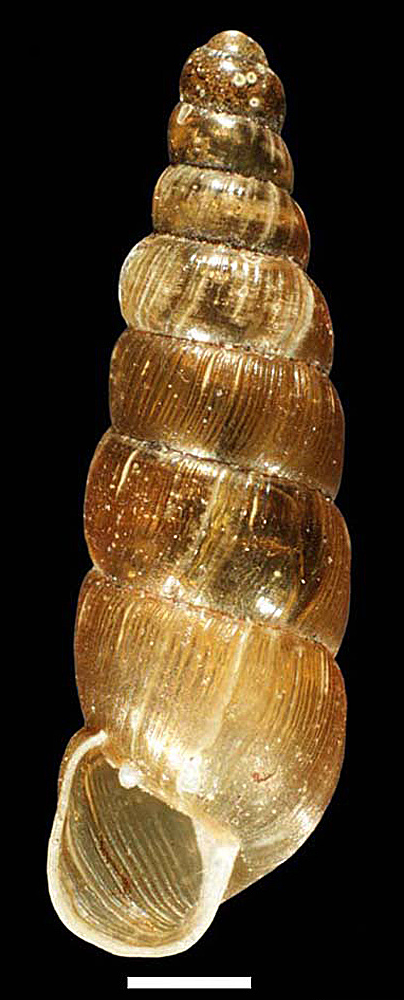
Apertural view.

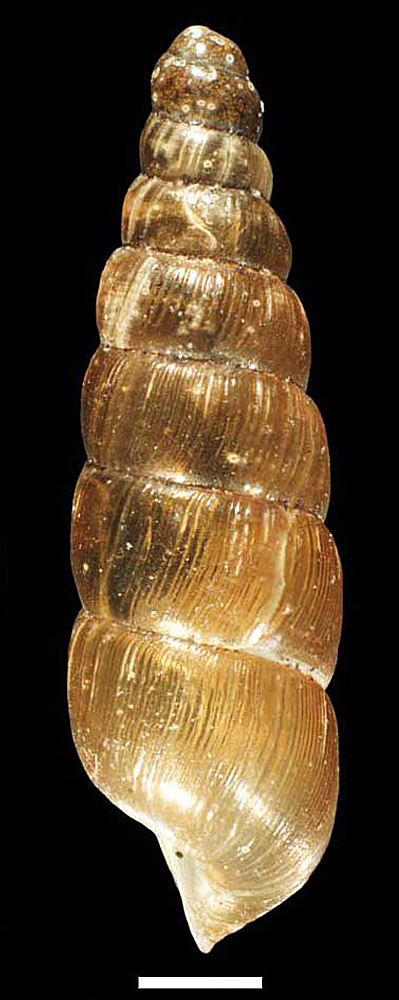
Lateral view.

== Ecology ==
Balea perversa lives on mosses and at the bark of trees, also near roads, at walls and rocky slopes, at rocks, less commonly in ground litter. It lives often on surfaces encrusted with lichens and other epiphytes. It prefers trees with rough bark. It prefers shady habitats in Portugal. It may tolerate non-calcareous soils. In Bulgaria it lives up to 1,600 m or perhaps to 2,400 m; in Switzerland up to 2,000 m.

It is easily dispersed by birds.

It feeds on mosses, algae, lichens, and cyanobacteria. It is known to selectively graze on various rock-dwelling lichens, particularly the crustose lichen species Verrucaria nigrescens.

It is ovoviviparous, self-fertilization predominates, even in laboratories when snails are kept in pairs. Animals can reach maturity after 3–4 months under favourable conditions, one adult can give birth to 10-20 juveniles per year. Animals can also be active in mild winters.

It is locally threatened by too thorough and too frequent restorations of old buildings, acid rains, air pollution and cutting of old trees. It has largely disappeared from inside cities. Remains frequent in Ireland, but many colonies in lowland England have certainly disappeared, extinct around London since the 1920s.
