= Staroń =

Staroń or Staroň is a surname. Notable people with the surname include:

- Agnieszka Nagay née Staroń (born 1981), Polish sport shooter
- Lidia Staroń (born 1960), Polish politician
- Peter Staroň (born 1973), Slovak ice hockey player
- Wojciech Staroń (born 1973), Polish cinematographer
