= Storen (surname) =

Storen or Støren is a surname. Notable people with the name include:

- Drew Storen (born 1987), American baseball player
- Finn Støren (1893–1962), Norwegian businessperson and civil servant
- Hannah Storen or Hannah Storm (born 1962), American television sports journalist
- Johan Nicolai Støren (1871–1956), Norwegian bishop and theologian
- Mike Storen (1935–2020), American sports executive
- Peter Johan Støren (1859–1925), Norwegian operating manager and politician
