= Støren =

Village in Midtre Gauldal Municipality, Norway

- Village
- Interactive map of Støren
- Location within Trøndelag Location within Norway
- Coordinates: 63.03908°N 10.28505°E
- Country: Norway
- Region: Central Norway
- County: Trøndelag
- District: Gauldalen
- Municipality: Midtre Gauldal Municipality

Area
  - Total: 2.43 km^{2} (0.94 sq mi)
- Elevation: 91 m (299 ft)

Population (2024)
  - Total: 2,320
  - Density: 955/km^{2} (2,470/sq mi)
- Time zone: UTC+01:00 (CET)
  - Summer (DST): UTC+02:00 (CEST)
- Post Code: 7290 Støren

Støren is the administrative centre of Midtre Gauldal Municipality in Trøndelag county, Norway. The village is located in the Gauldal Valley at the confluence of the Gaula and Sokna Rivers. Støren is located on the European route E6 and is about 50 kilometres (31 mi) south of the city of Trondheim.

The junction between the Dovrebanen and Rørosbanen railway lines is at Støren Station in the northern part of the village. Støren Church, a school, government services, and commercial and industrial sites are all located in the village.

The 2.43-square-kilometre (600-acre) village has a population of 2,320 as of 2024 and a population density of 955 inhabitants per square kilometre (2,470/sq mi).

From 1838 to 1964, the village of Støren was the administrative centre of the old Støren Municipality.

On June 17, 2025, Støren was hit by a strong tornado. This IF2 tornado caused extensive damage to a camping site, tossing and mangling caravans, one of which landed in the Gaula River. Trees were downed and a barn sustained heavy damage.

== Name ==
The village (and parish/municipality) was named after the old Støren farm (Old Norse: Staurin) since the first Støren Church was built there. The first element is staurr which means "pole" or "stake". The word staurr is probably referring to the pointed headland on which the church is located. The two rivers that form this headland are the Gaula and Sokna. The last element is vin which means "meadow" or "pasture".

== Media gallery ==
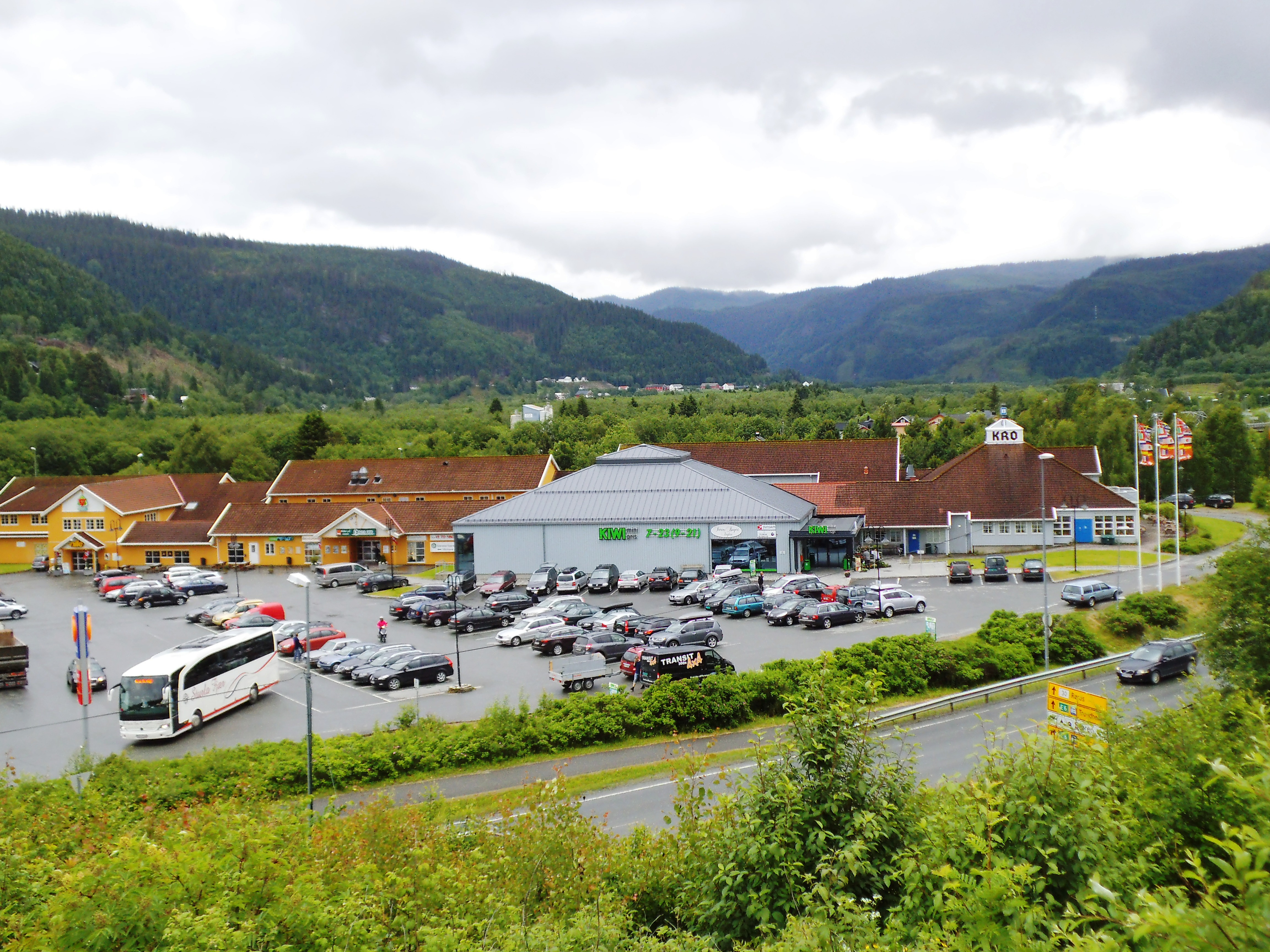
Village centre

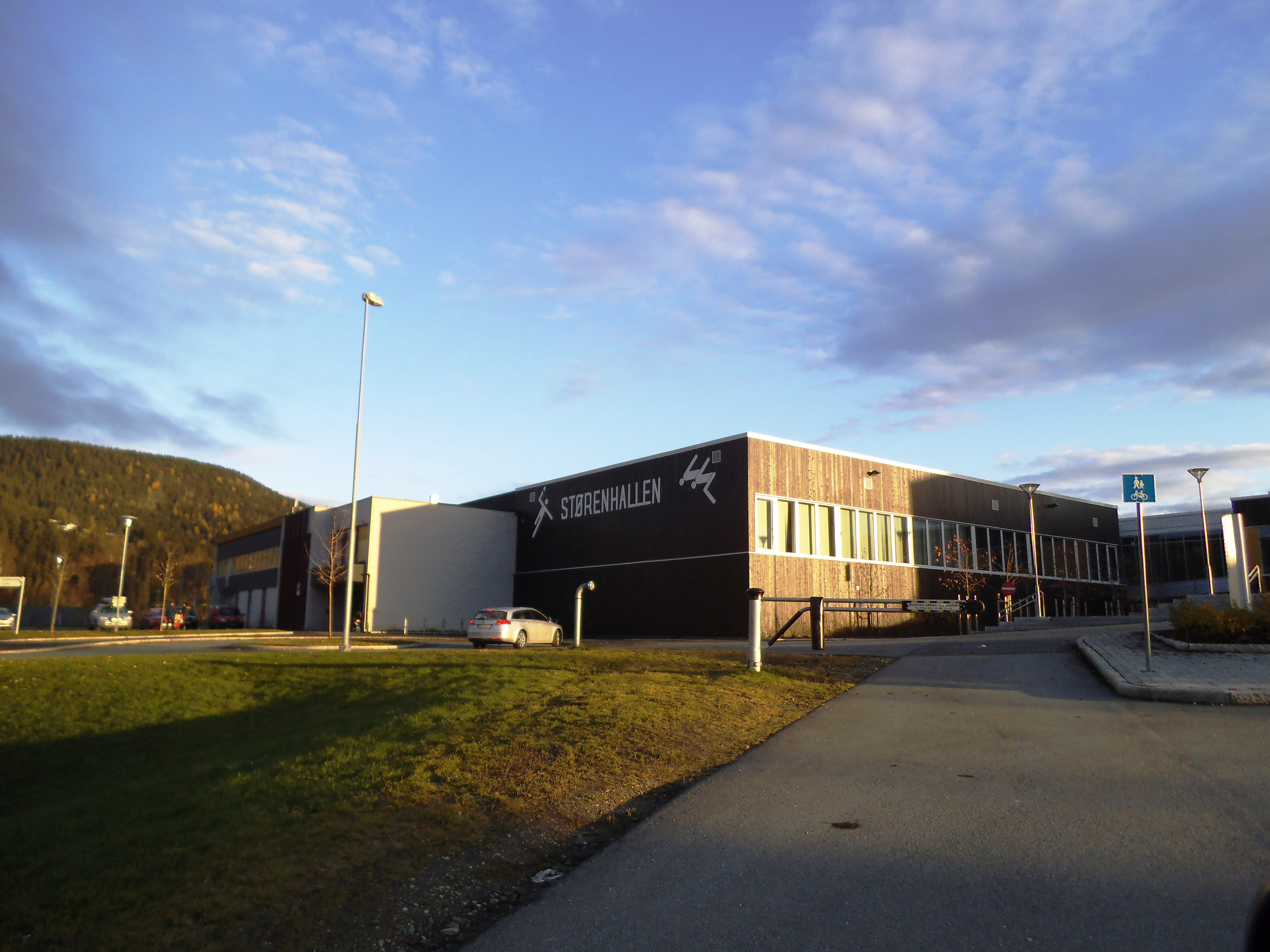
Størenhallen

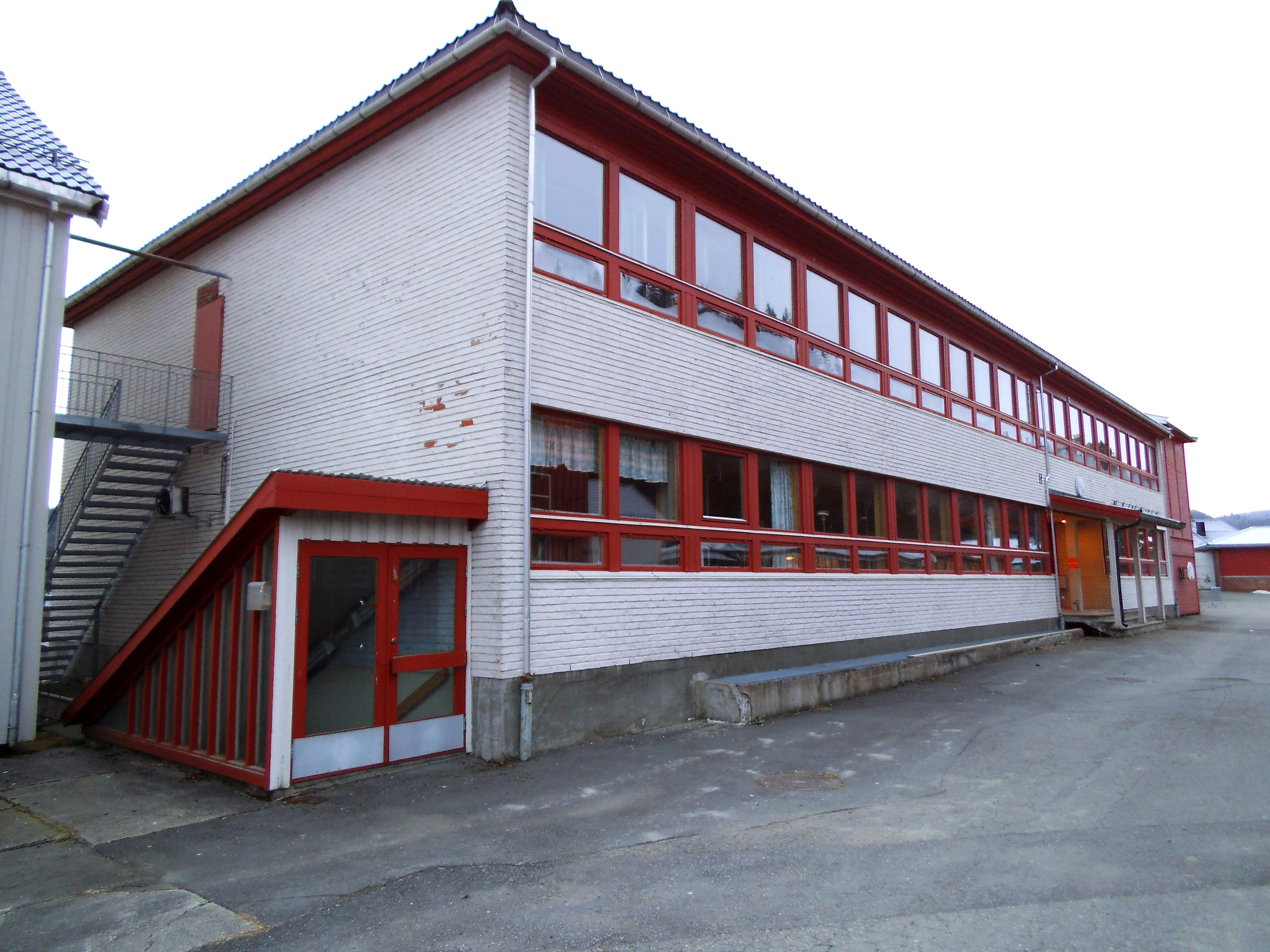
School in Støren

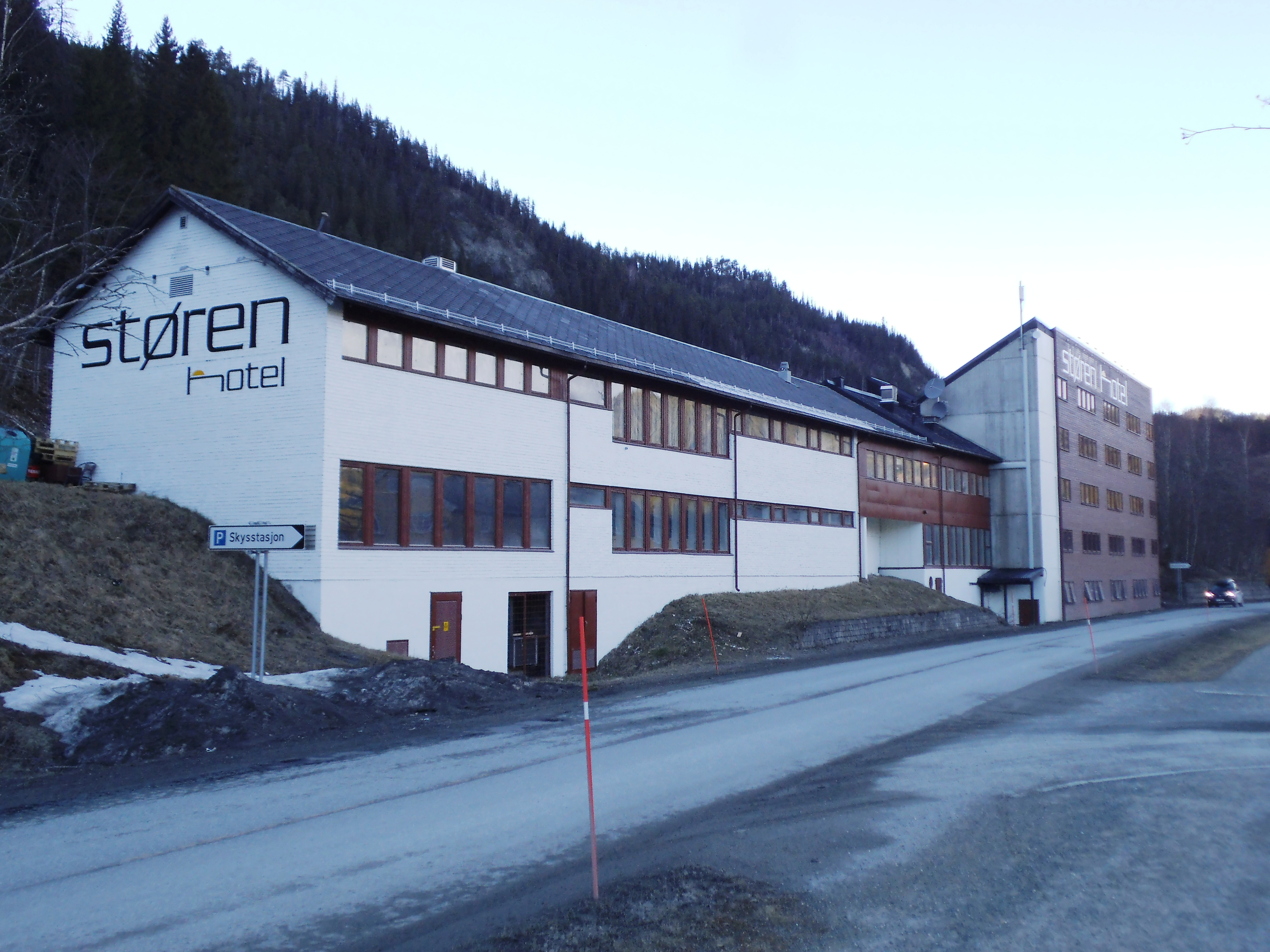
Støren hotel

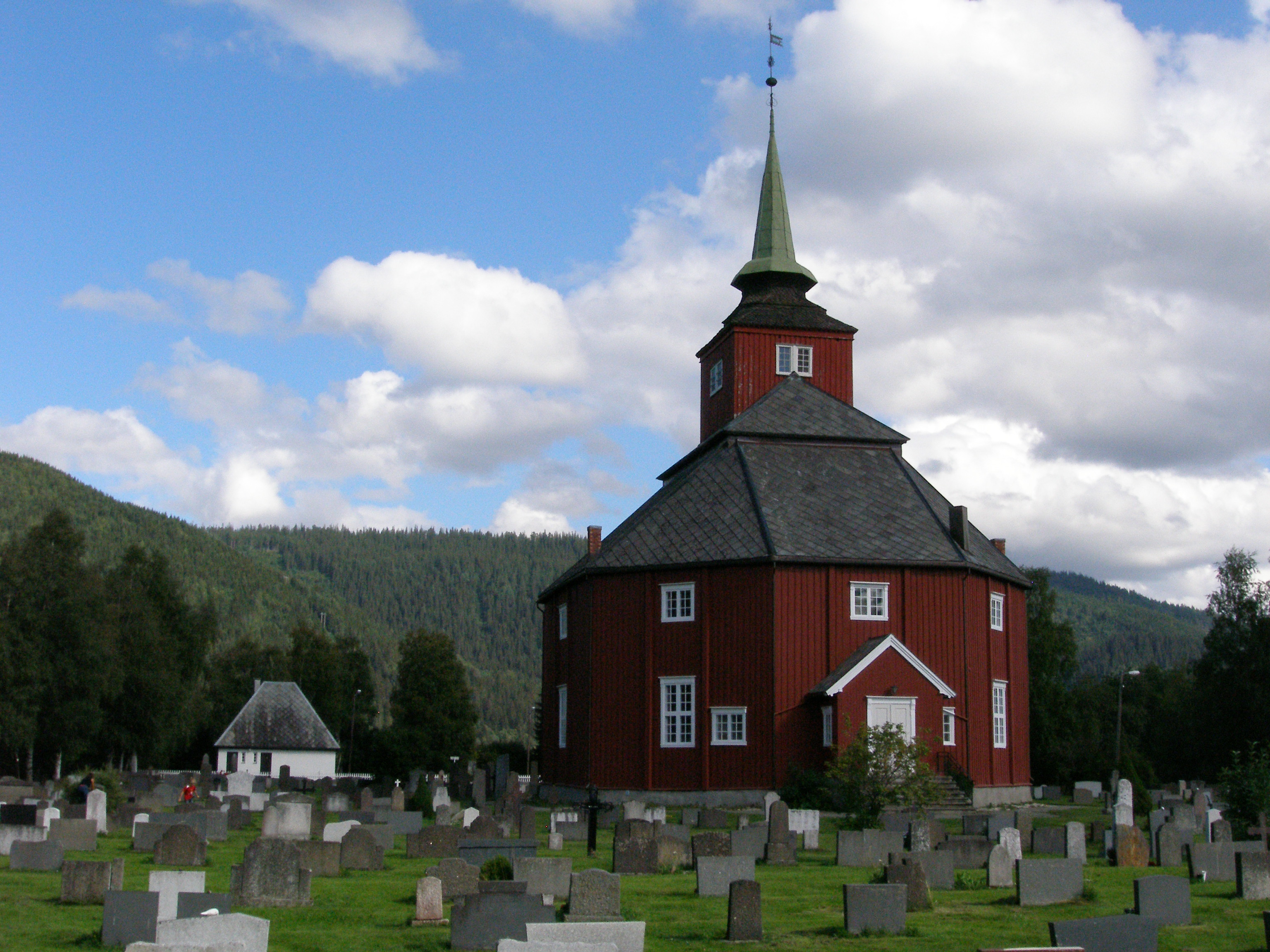
Støren Church

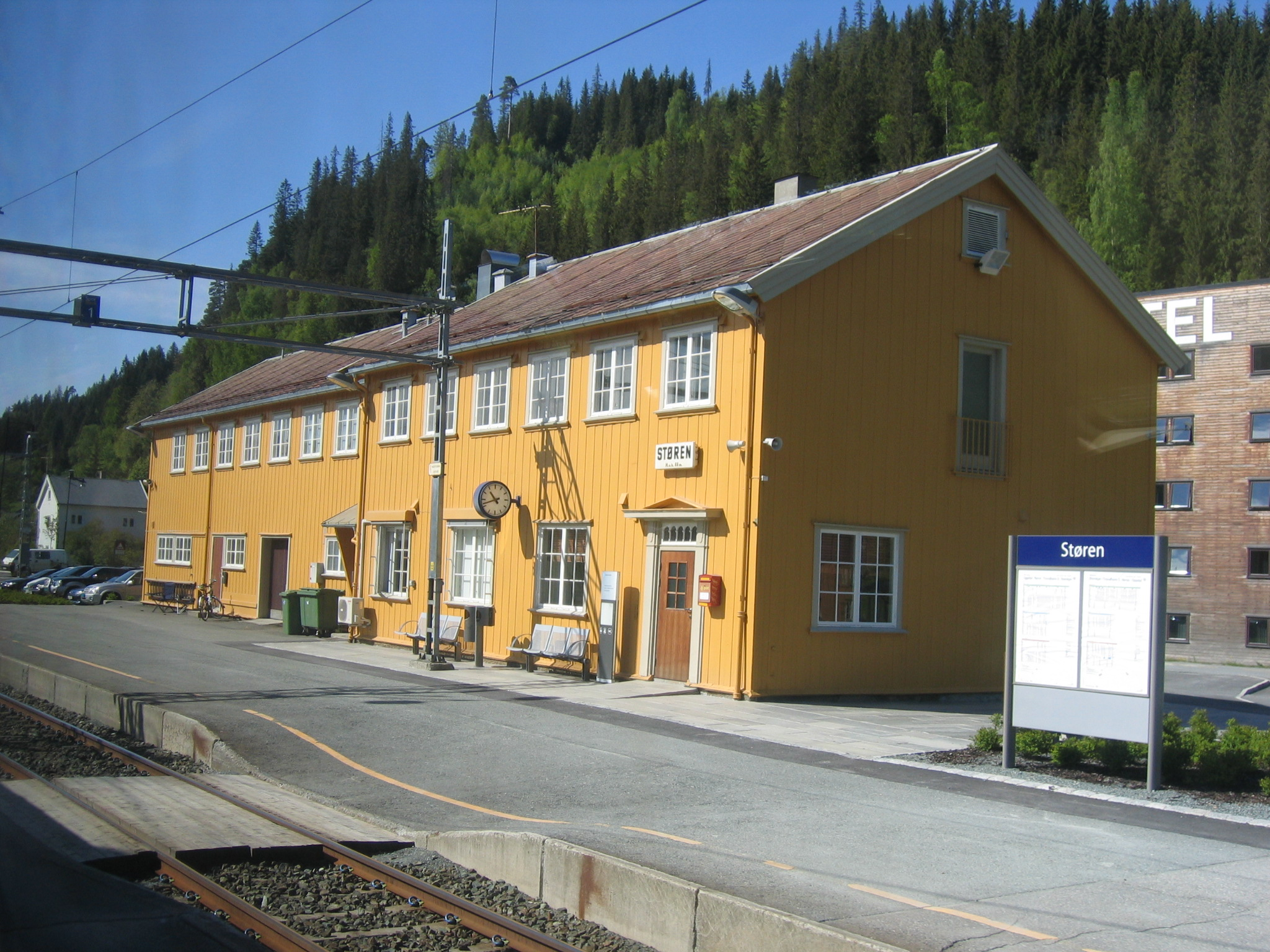
Støren Station

== Popular culture ==
The 1974 Norwegian movie Bør Børson Jr. made Støren famous. In this movie, the protagonist, Bør Børson, is visiting a fictional bakery in Støren.
