= Soknedal Church =

Church in Trøndelag, Norway

- Soknedal kirke
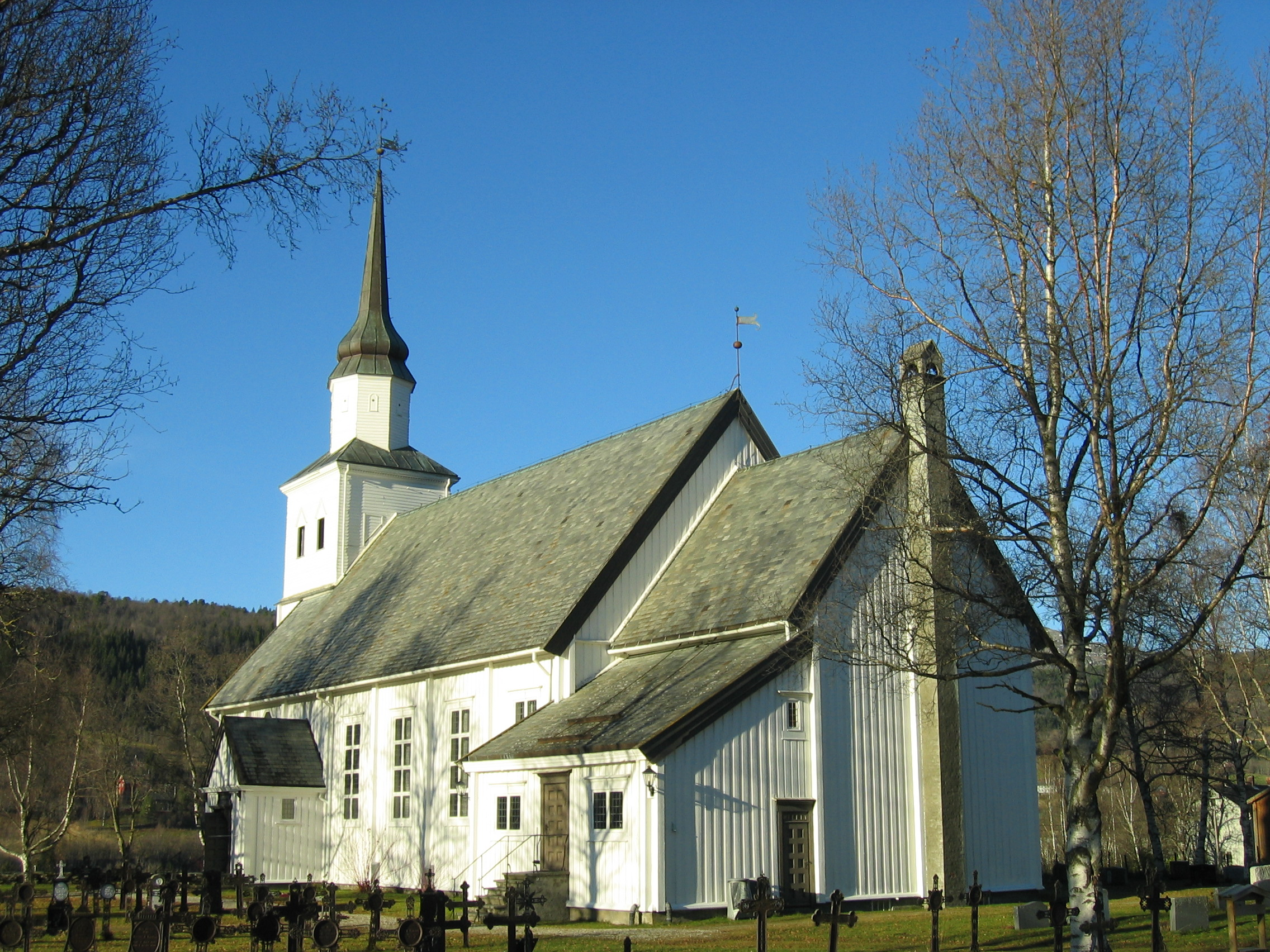
- View of the church
- Soknedal Church
- 62.9548169272°N 10.19244253635°E
- Location: Midtre Gauldal Municipality, Trøndelag
- Country: Norway
- Denomination: Church of Norway
- Churchmanship: Evangelical Lutheran

History
- Status: Parish church
- Founded: 13th century
- Consecrated: 1933

Architecture
- Functional status: Active
- Architect: John Egil Tverdahl
- Architectural type: Long church
- Completed: 1933 (93 years ago)

Specifications
- Capacity: 480
- Materials: Wood

Administration
- Diocese: Nidaros bispedømme
- Deanery: Gauldal prosti
- Parish: Soknedal
- Norwegian Cultural Heritage Site
- Type: Church
- Status: Listed
- ID: 85510

Soknedal Church (Norwegian: Soknedal kirke) is a parish church of the Church of Norway in Midtre Gauldal Municipality in Trøndelag county, Norway. It is located in the village of Soknedal. It is the church for the Soknedal parish which is part of the Gauldal prosti (deanery) in the Diocese of Nidaros. The white, wooden church was built in a long church design in 1933 using plans drawn up by the architect John Egil Tverdahl. The church seats about 480 people.

== History ==
The earliest existing historical records of the church date back to the year 1533, but the church was likely built during the 13th century. The first church in Soknedal was likely a stave church. Local tradition says it was located along the east side of the old "King's Road" through the Hovmoen area, about 500 metres (1,600 ft) north of the current church, although this site has not been confirmed.

In 1651, a new church was built. It was consecrated on 14 December 1651. This building was a timber-framed long church that was located about 120 metres (390 ft) southwest of the old church site on the west side of the road, near Presthus. This new church was about 7–8 metres (23–26 ft) wide and about 15 metres (49 ft) long. After the new church was completed, the old church was torn down.

In 1861, it was decided to build a new church when the old one was too small and the roof was also in very poor condition. A new wooden long church was consecrated in 1864. The new church was located just south of the main plateau of Hov, about 450 metres (1,480 ft) southeast of where the previous church had stood. The building burned down in a fire in 1932. A new church was built the next year in 1933 on the foundations of the previous church.

== Media gallery ==
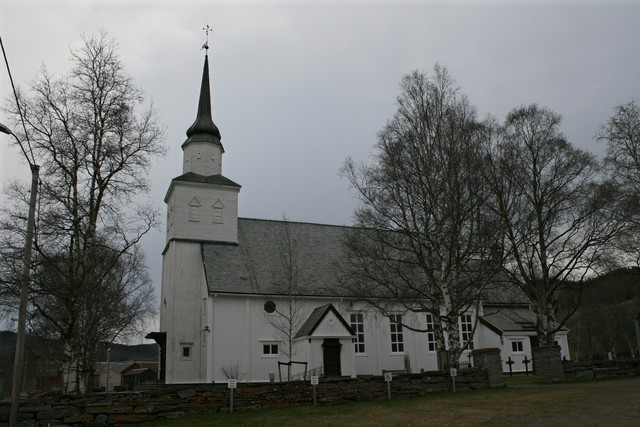

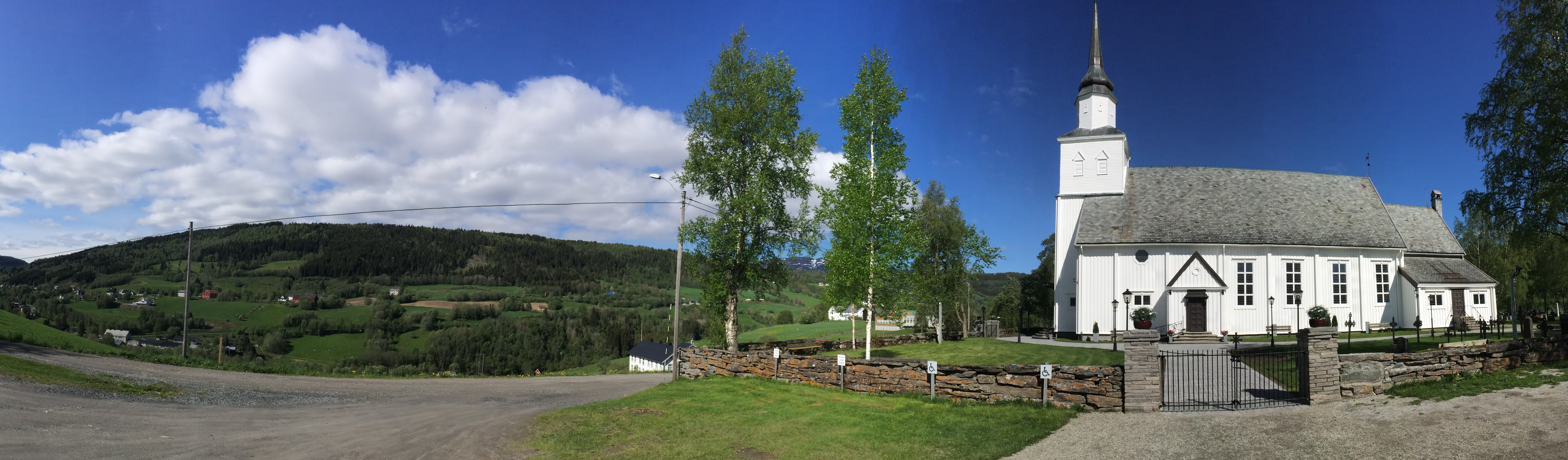

== See also ==
- List of churches in Nidaros
