= Støren Church =

Church in Trøndelag, Norway

- Støren kirke
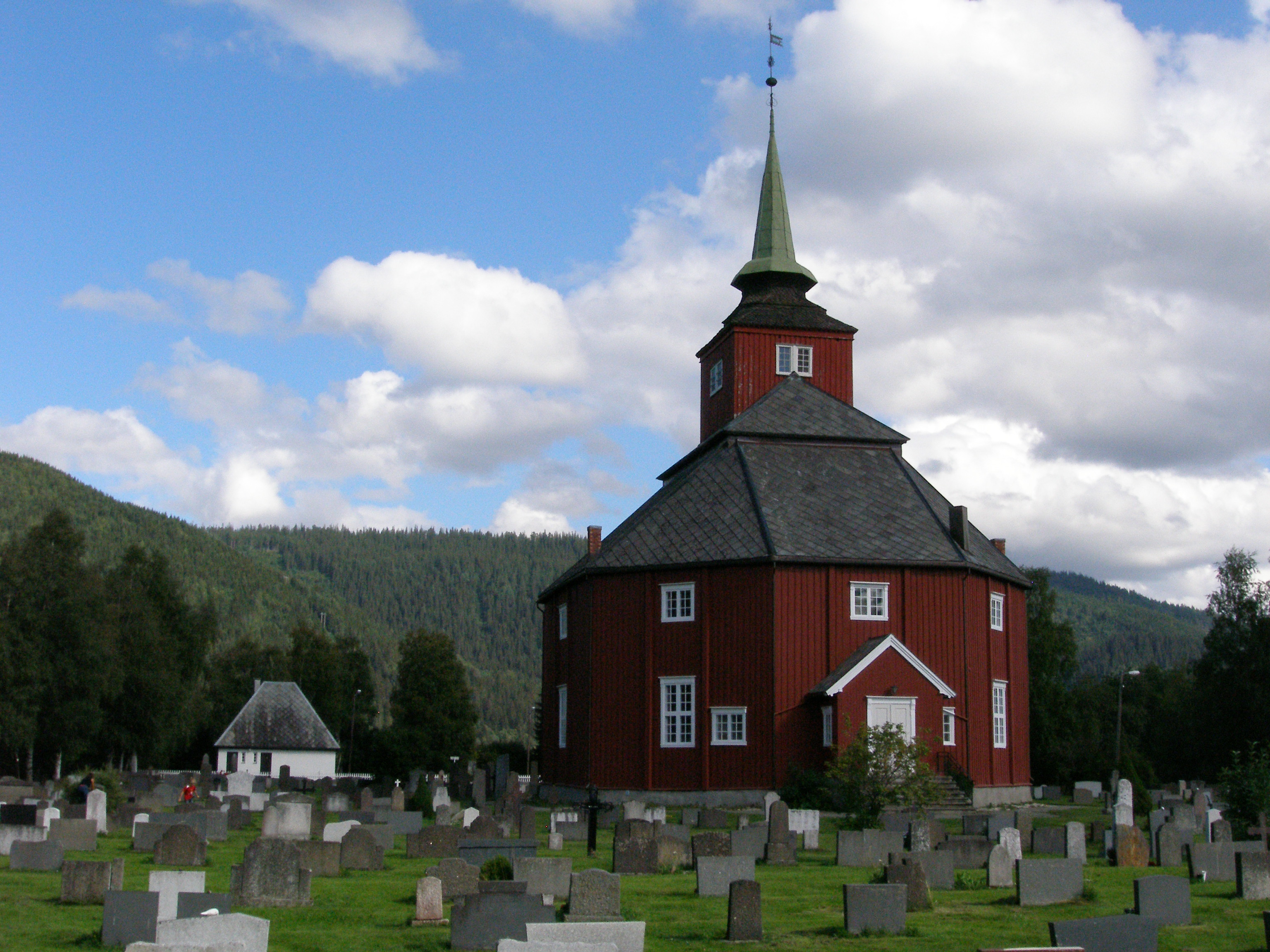
- View of the church
- Støren Church
- 63.0314299127°N 10.2916131913°E
- Location: Midtre Gauldal Municipality, Trøndelag
- Country: Norway
- Denomination: Church of Norway
- Churchmanship: Evangelical Lutheran

History
- Status: Parish church
- Founded: 13th century
- Consecrated: 1817

Architecture
- Functional status: Active
- Architect(s): Svend Aspaas and Lars Forseth
- Architectural type: Octagonal
- Completed: 1817 (209 years ago)

Specifications
- Capacity: 400
- Materials: Wood

Administration
- Diocese: Nidaros bispedømme
- Deanery: Gauldal prosti
- Parish: Støren
- Norwegian Cultural Heritage Site
- Type: Church
- Status: Automatically protected
- ID: 84993

Støren Church (Norwegian: Støren kirke) is a parish church of the Church of Norway in Midtre Gauldal Municipality in Trøndelag county, Norway. It is located in the village of Støren. It is the church for the Støren parish which is part of the Gauldal prosti (deanery) in the Diocese of Nidaros. The red, wooden church was built in an octagonal design in 1817 using plans drawn up by the architects Svend Aspaas and Lars Forseth. The church seats about 400 people.

== History ==
The earliest existing historical records of the church date back to the year 1432, but the church was not new that year. The first church in Støren was likely a stave church that was built in the 12th century. It was originally located about 200 metres (660 ft) to the north of the present church site, on the other side of the river Sokna, just west of the confluence of the rivers Sokna and Gaula.

In 1665, a new church was built about 200 metres (660 ft) south of the old church. When the new church was completed, the old church was torn down. The main reason for moving the church was the river which had sometimes flooded as well as the erosion of the river banks, making the church too close to the river's edge and too risky for flood damage. The new church site was chosen because it is higher and further from the riverbank. (By 1775, it was noted that the river was flowing on top of the site of the old church due to natural movement of the river channel.) The church from 1665 had a cruciform design with a tall spire above the centre of the church.

In 1814, this church served as an election church (Norwegian: valgkirke). Together with more than 300 other parish churches across Norway, it was a polling station for elections to the 1814 Norwegian Constituent Assembly which wrote the Constitution of Norway. This was Norway's first national elections. Each church parish was a constituency that elected people called "electors" who later met together in each county to elect the representatives for the assembly that was to meet at Eidsvoll Manor later that year.

By 1815, the old building was found to be so dilapidated that it had to be demolished. A new timber-framed church with an octagonal floor plan was completed and consecrated in 1817. The new church was designed using plans drawn up by the architect Svend Aspaas, however he died in 1816, so Lars Forseth was hired to lead the work using Aspaas' plans. Aspaas was also involved in the construction of the nearby Røros Church and Sør-Fron Church which are both similar in design to this church.

== Media gallery ==
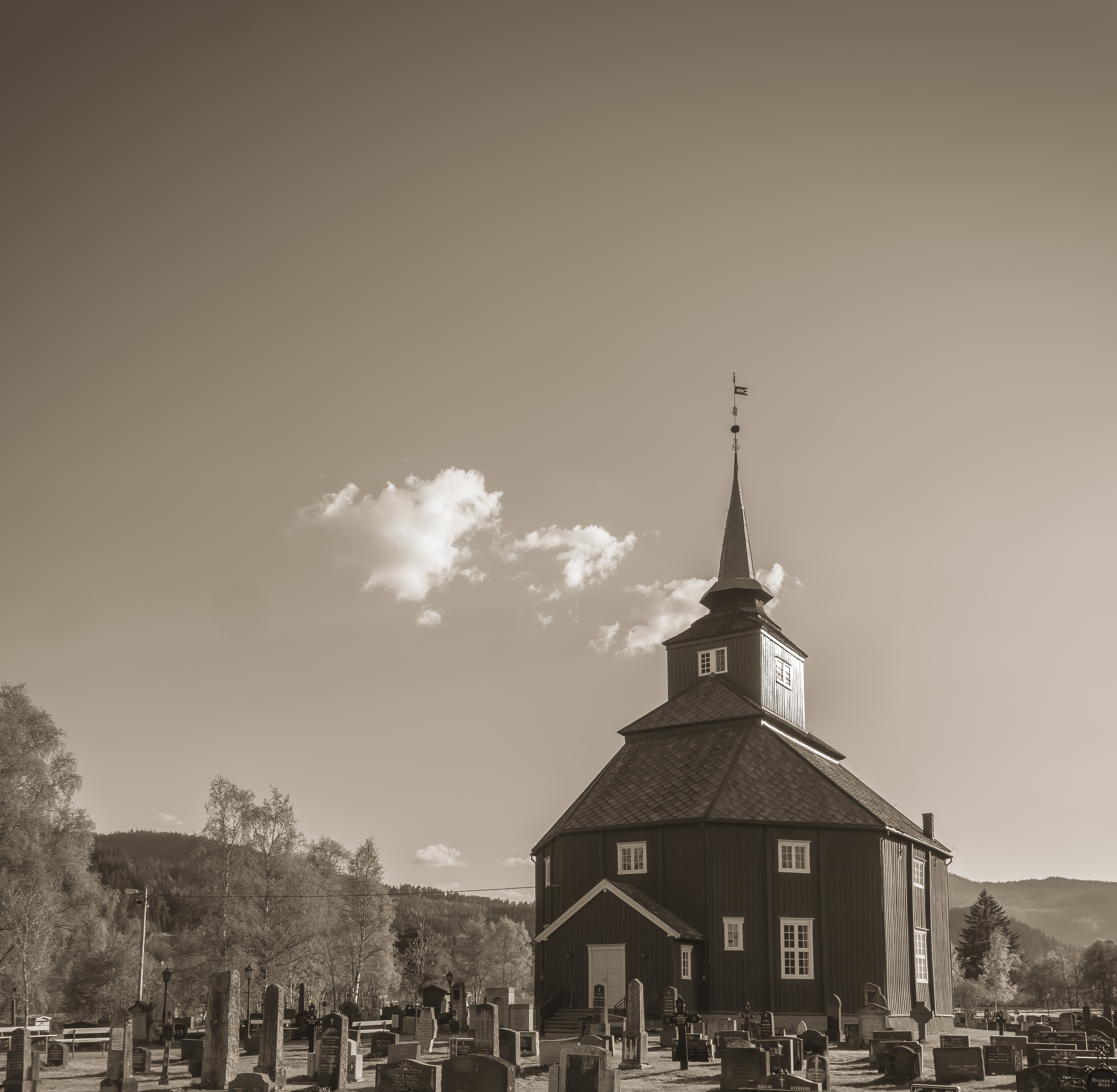

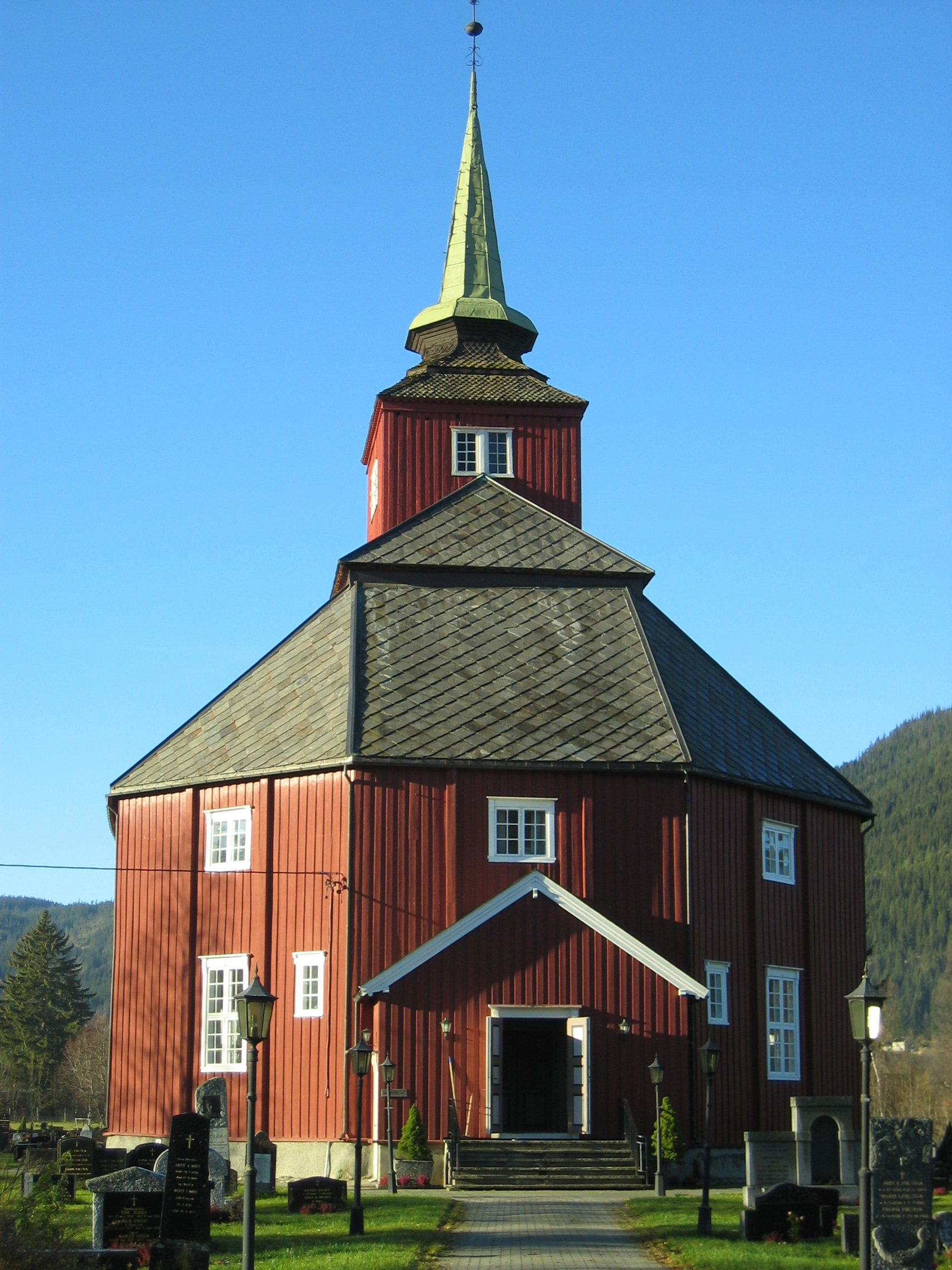

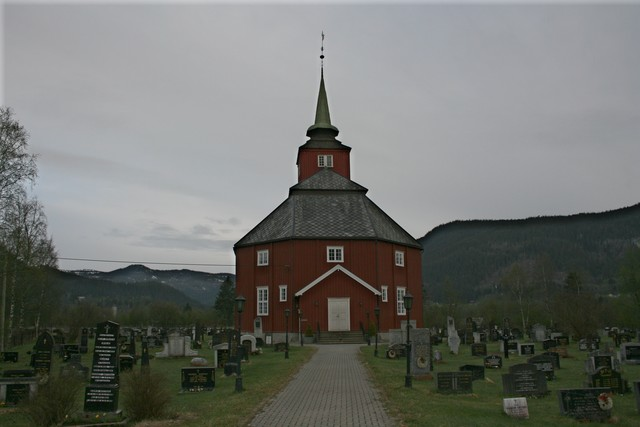

== See also ==
- List of churches in Nidaros
