= Storön =

Name of a number of islands in Sweden

Storön or Storö are very common names and a number of Swedish islands bear them, both in the Stockholm archipelago and elsewhere around the coast.

Storö (in English "big island" or "large island") is an island located in the archipelago outside of Stockholm, the capital of Sweden.

Storö is located just south of Ljusterö, and north of Värmdö. The island hosts around 20 summer cottages, and is a popular summer refuge by its inhabitants. However, during winter time the cottages are commonly uninhabited and the island abandoned.

The length of Storö measured from its southern to its northern peak is roughly 1,900 meters, or 1.16 miles.
