= Trollgarden =

Glacial moraine in Norway

Highest point
- Elevation: 820 m (2,690 ft)
- Coordinates: 59.3013°N 6.5827°E

Geography
- Location: Rogaland, Norway
- Parent range: Hjelmelandsheiene
- Topo map: 2232 Hjelmelandsheiene

Trollgarden is a glacial moraine in Hjelmeland Municipality in Rogaland county, Norway. The moraine is a 5-metre (16 ft) tall ridge of stones, rocks, and boulders that runs for about 2 kilometres (1.2 mi) from the east side of the lake Kvivatnet across the moorland to the northern side of the mountain Brendeknuten in the Hjelmelandsheiane mountains. The name "Trollgarden" is translated to English as The Troll's stone fence since it looks like a rock wall that a troll may have built around its farm. The ridge sits about 8 kilometres (5.0 mi) southeast of the village of Jøsenfjorden and about 25 kilometres (16 mi) northeast of the village of Hjelmelandsvågen.

== Access ==
In the old days, people thought it was magic powers such as trolls that had built the massive stone fence far into the Hjelmeland moors. The geological explanation is that, when the glacial ice retreated, the stones were deposited in the mountains. To see Trollgarden, one must hike for about two hours to reach the moraine. The 5-metre (16 ft) tall ridge is clearly visible in the bare mountains, at an elevation of just over 800 metres (2,600 ft) above sea level.

== Geology ==
The geology of the Trollgarden area was thoroughly investigated and described by Professor Bjørn G. Andersen in his Master's thesis (1954) ”Om isens tilbaketrekking i området mellom Lysefjorden og Jøsenfjorden i Ryfylke” (On the glacial retreat in the area between the Lysefjorden and Jøsenfjorden in Ryfylke).

== See also ==
- List of mountains of Norway
- Terminal moraine
- List of glacial moraines
