= Hjelmeland =

Hjelmeland may refer to:

== People ==
- Bjarte Hjelmeland (born 1970), a Norwegian actor and theatre director
- Thea Hjelmeland (born 1987), a Norwegian musician, singer and songwriter

== Places ==
- Hjelmeland Municipality, a municipality in Rogaland county, Norway
- Hjelmeland (village), a village within Hjelmeland Municipality in Rogaland county, Norway
- Hjelmeland Church, a church in Hjelmeland Municipality in Rogaland county, Norway
