= Øvre Tysdalsvatnet =

Lake in Rogaland, Norway

- Øvra Tyssdalsvatnet
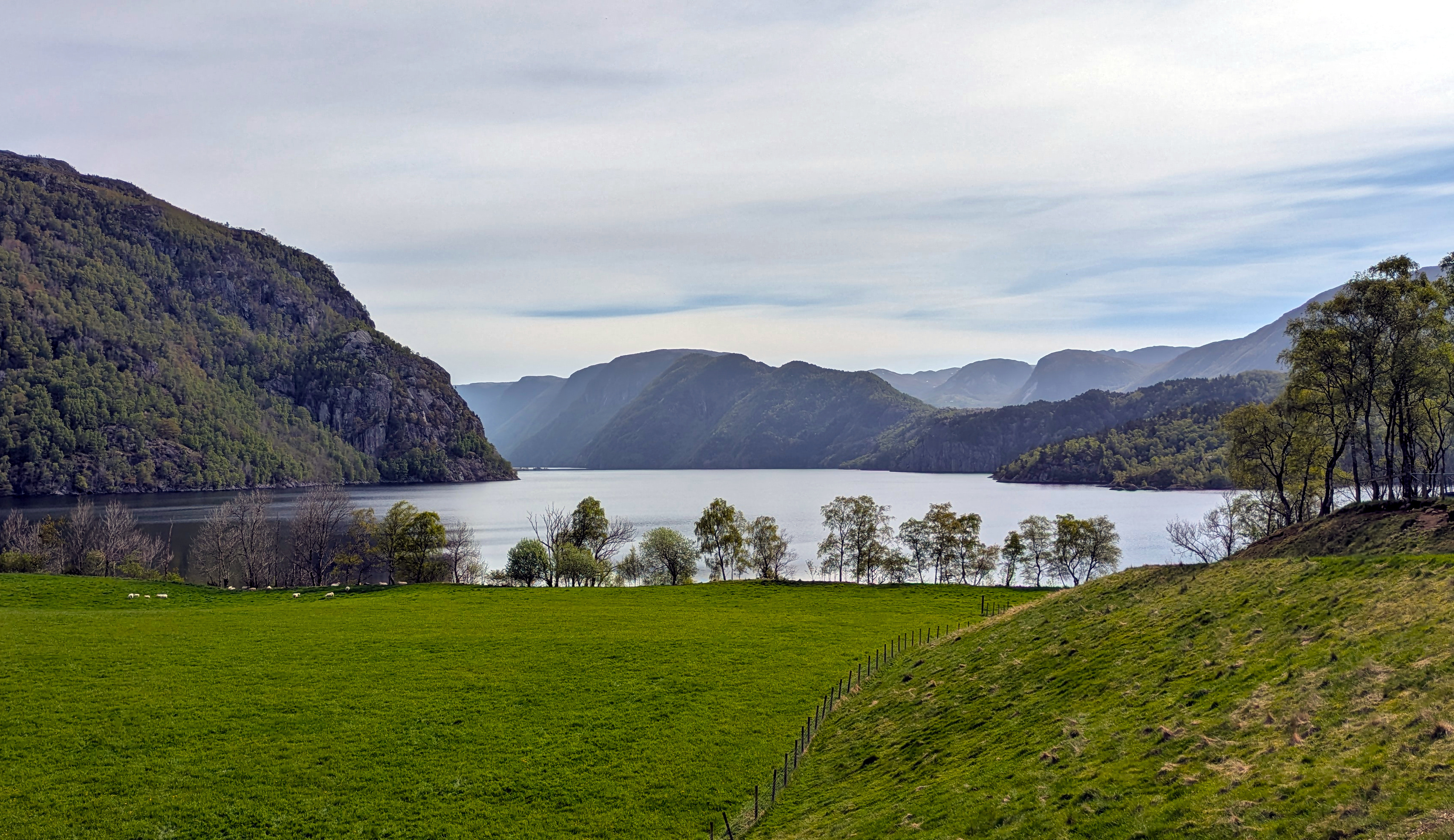
- Interactive map of Øvre Tysdalsvatnet
- Location: Hjelmeland Municipality, Rogaland
- Coordinates: 59.16144°N 6.33502°E
- Basin countries: Norway
- Max. length: 12 kilometres (7.5 mi)
- Max. width: 800 metres (0.50 mi)
- Surface area: 8.98 km^{2} (3.47 sq mi)
- Shore length^{1}: 27 kilometres (17 mi)
- Surface elevation: 67 metres (220 ft)
- References: NVE
- ^{1} Shore length is not a well-defined measure.

Øvre Tysdalsvatnet is a lake in Hjelmeland Municipality in Rogaland county, Norway. The 9-square-kilometre (3.5 sq mi) lake lies on the east side of the village of Årdal. The 12-kilometre (7.5 mi) long lake is only about 800 metres (0.5 mi) wide and it has a fairly steep shoreline, which results in very little habitation around the lake.

== Name ==
The name "Øvre" Tysdalsvatnet means "upper" Tysdalsvatnet to distinguish it from the lake Tysdalsvatnet located about 5 kilometres (3.1 mi) to the southwest.

== See also ==
- List of lakes in Norway
