= Årdal Municipality (Rogaland) =

Former municipality in Rogaland, Norway

Årdal Municipality Årdal herred
- Former municipality
- Aardal herred (historic name)
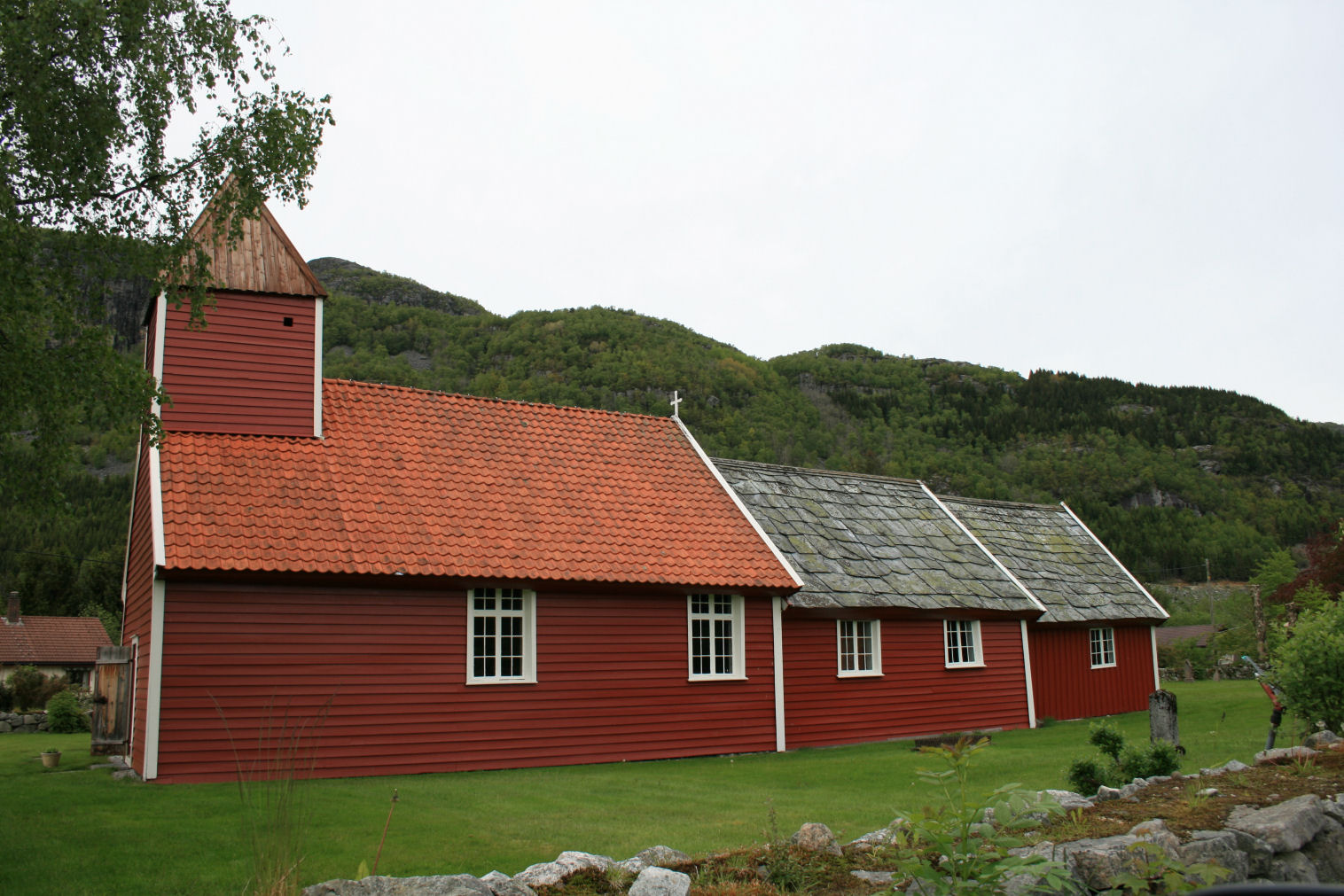
- View of the Old Årdal Church

- Rogaland within Norway

- Årdal within Rogaland
- Coordinates: 59°09′10″N 06°09′39″E
- Country: Norway
- County: Rogaland
- District: Ryfylke
- Established: 1 July 1849
  - Preceded by: Hjelmeland Municipality
- Disestablished: 1 Jan 1965
  - Succeeded by: Hjelmeland Municipality and Strand Municipality
- Administrative centre: Årdal

Government
  - Mayor (1963–1964): Johannes Soppeland

Area (upon dissolution)
  - Total: 505.3 km^{2} (195.1 sq mi)
  - Rank: #206 in Norway
- Highest elevation: 1,235 m (4,052 ft)

Population (1964)
  - Total: 866
  - Rank: #495 in Norway
  - Density: 1.7/km^{2} (4.4/sq mi)
  - Change (10 years): ▼ −0.1%

Official language
  - Norwegian form: Neutral
- Time zone: UTC+01:00 (CET)
  - Summer (DST): UTC+02:00 (CEST)
- ISO 3166 code: NO-1131

Årdal is a former municipality in Rogaland county, Norway. The 505.3-square-kilometre (195.1 sq mi) municipality existed from 1859 until its dissolution in 1965. The area is now part of Hjelmeland Municipality in the traditional district of Ryfylke. The administrative centre was the village of Årdal where the Old Årdal Church is located.

Prior to its dissolution in 1965, the 505.3-square-kilometre (195.1 sq mi) municipality was the 206th largest by area out of the 525 municipalities in Norway. Årdal Municipality was the 495th most populous municipality in Norway with a population of about 866. The municipality's population density was 1.7 inhabitants per square kilometre (4.4/sq mi) and its population had decreased by 0.1% over the previous 10-year period.

== General information ==
The municipality of Aardal (later spelled Årdal) was established on 1 July 1849 when the large Hjelmeland Municipality was divided into two: the southern district (population: 1,315) became the new Aardal Municipality and the northern district (population: 3,084) remained as a smaller Hjelmeland Municipality (on the same date the municipality was renamed as Hjelmeland og Fister Municipality). On 6 March 1869, a small area of Aardal Municipality (population: 40) was transferred to the neighboring Hjelmeland og Fister Municipality.

During the 1960s, there were many municipal mergers across Norway due to the work of the Schei Committee. On 1 January 1965, Årdal Municipality was dissolved. On that date, the Sunngardene area of the old Årdal Municipality (population: 121) was transferred to the neighboring Strand Municipality. The rest of Årdal municipality was merged with the following areas to form a larger Hjelmeland Municipality:

- all of Hjelmeland Municipality (population: 1,691)
- the eastern part of Fister Municipality (population: 467), including the mainland and part of Randøy island
- most of Årdal Municipality (population: 743), except for the Sunngardene area which went to Strand Municipality
- the Buergården areas of Jelsa Municipality (population: 8)

=== Name ===
The municipality (originally the parish) is named after the Årdalen valley (Old Norse: Árdalr) since it is the central geographical feature of the municipality. The first element is the genitive case of the word á which means "river" or "creek". The last element is dalr which means "valley" or "dale".

On 21 December 1917, a royal resolution enacted the 1917 Norwegian language reforms. Prior to this change, the name was spelled Aardal with the digraph "Aa", and after this reform, the name was spelled Årdal, using the letter Å instead.

=== Churches ===
The Church of Norway had one parish (sokn) within Årdal Municipality. At the time of the municipal dissolution, it was part of the Hjelmeland prestegjeld and the Ryfylke prosti (deanery) in the Diocese of Stavanger.

Churches in Årdal Municipality
Parish (sokn)	Church name	Location of the church	Year built
Årdal	Årdal Church	Årdal	1919
Årdal	Old Årdal Church	Årdal	1619

== Geography ==
The municipality was centered around the Årdalsfjorden, a branch off the main Boknafjorden. The municipality stretched from the fjord over 40 kilometres (25 mi) to the mountainous county border to the east. The highest point in the municipality was the 1,235-metre (4,052 ft) tall mountain Skrumleknuten, a tripoint on the borders of Årdal Municipality, Forsand Municipality, and Bykle Municipality (in Aust-Agder county). Hjelmeland Municipality was located to the north, Bykle Municipality (in Aust-Agder county) was located to the east, Forsand Municipality was located to the south, Strand Municipality was located to the southwest, and Fister Municipality was located to the northwest.

== Government ==
While it existed, Årdal Municipality was responsible for primary education (through 10th grade), outpatient health services, senior citizen services, welfare and other social services, zoning, economic development, and municipal roads and utilities. The municipality was governed by a municipal council of directly elected representatives. The mayor was indirectly elected by a vote of the municipal council. The municipality was under the jurisdiction of the Ryfylke District Court and the Gulating Court of Appeal.

=== Municipal council ===
The municipal council (Herredsstyre) of Årdal Municipality was made up of 13 representatives that were elected to four year terms. The tables below show the historical composition of the council by political party.

Årdal herredsstyre 1963–1965
Party name (in Norwegian)	Number of representatives
Local List(s) (Lokale lister)	13
Total number of members:	13
Note: On 1 January 1965, Årdal Municipality was divided between Hjelmeland Municipality and Strand Municipality.

Årdal herredsstyre 1959–1963
Party name (in Norwegian)	Number of representatives
Local List(s) (Lokale lister)	13
Total number of members:	13

Årdal herredsstyre 1955–1959
Party name (in Norwegian)	Number of representatives
Local List(s) (Lokale lister)	13
Total number of members:	13

Årdal herredsstyre 1951–1955
Party name (in Norwegian)	Number of representatives
Local List(s) (Lokale lister)	12
Total number of members:	12

Årdal herredsstyre 1947–1951
Party name (in Norwegian)	Number of representatives
Local List(s) (Lokale lister)	12
Total number of members:	12

Årdal herredsstyre 1945–1947
Party name (in Norwegian)	Number of representatives
Local List(s) (Lokale lister)	12
Total number of members:	12

Årdal herredsstyre 1937–1941*
Party name (in Norwegian)	Number of representatives
Local List(s) (Lokale lister)	12
Total number of members:	12
Note: Due to the German occupation of Norway during World War II, no elections were held for new municipal councils until after the war ended in 1945.

=== Mayors ===
The mayor (Norwegian: ordfører) of Årdal Municipality was the political leader of the municipality and the chairperson of the municipal council. The following people have held this position:

- 1849–1853: Torbjørn Torbjørnsen Tjendland
- 1853–1853: Nils Reiarsen Nessa
- 1854–1863: Søren Christophersen Schmidt
- 1864–1865: Nils Larsen Mæle
- 1866–1869: Daniel Thorsen Riveland
- 1870–1873: Nils Larsen Mæle
- 1874–1885: Ole Pedersen Leerstøl
- 1886–1901: Gudmund Vallem
- 1902–1904: Søren K. Schmidt
- 1905–1907: Adolf Andreassen
- 1908–1910: Gudmund Vallem
- 1911–1913: Adolf Andreassen
- 1914–1916: Jone Th. Lunde
- 1917–1919: Tor S. Tveit
- 1920–1922: Sigvart Schmidt
- 1923–1925: Tor S. Tveit
- 1926–1931: Sigvart Schmidt
- 1932–1941: Daniel Kleppa
- 1942–1945: Truls Krogh-Borgen
- 1945–1947: Daniel Kleppa
- 1947–1951: Johan Ur
- 1951–1963: Daniel Kleppa
- 1963–1964: Johannes Soppeland

== Attractions ==
=== Old Årdal Church ===
Årdal is well known for the Old Årdal Church (Årdal gamle kirke) which received its final shape after expansion shortly after it was built in the early 17th century. The church was marked by the work of two local artists, the German-born painter Gottfried Hendtzschel (d. 1657 in Stavanger) and the craftsman Lauritz Snekker who was his student. The altarpiece and the pulpit was painted by Hendtzschel. They were both carved by Snekker who was also responsible for most of the carpentry work. The artistic efforts of Hendtzschel and Snekker within various churches in the vicinity formed a part of the Stranganger Renaissance (Stavangerrenaissance), the cultural period which peaked in the middle of the 17th century in the area around Stavanger.

== See also ==
- List of former municipalities of Norway
