= Fister =

Village in Hjelmeland Municipality, Norway

- Village
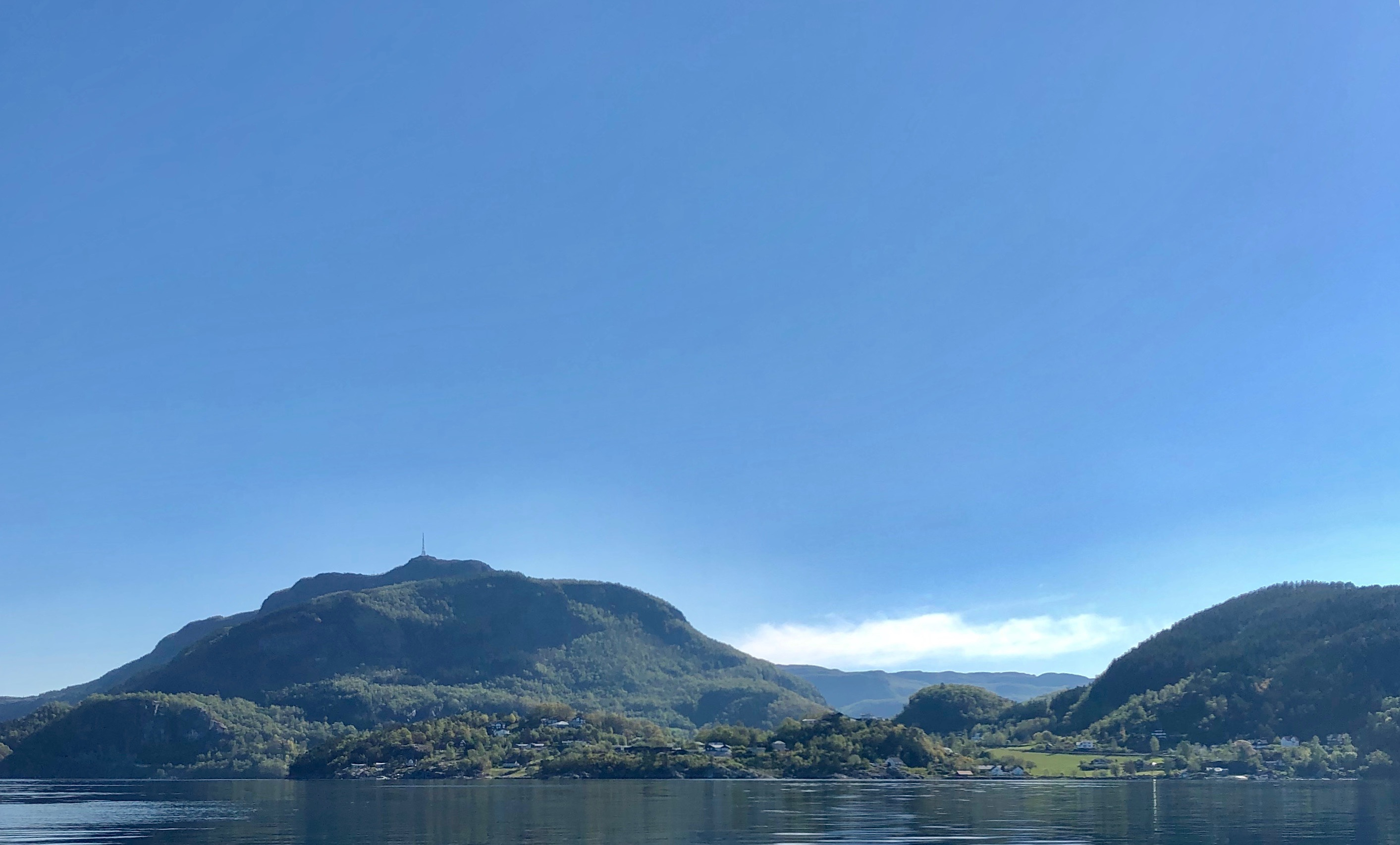
- View of Fister from the fjord
- Interactive map of Fister
- Coordinates: 59.17624°N 6.06768°E
- Country: Norway
- Region: Western Norway
- County: Rogaland
- District: Ryfylke
- Municipality: Hjelmeland Municipality
- Elevation: 18 m (59 ft)
- Time zone: UTC+01:00 (CET)
  - Summer (DST): UTC+02:00 (CEST)
- Postal code: 4139 Fister

Fister is a village in Hjelmeland Municipality in Rogaland county, Norway. The village is located on the mainland, along the Fisterfjorden, a branch off the main Boknafjorden. The village lies about eight kilometres (5 mi) northwest of the village of Årdal and about ten kilometres (6 mi) southwest of the municipal centre of Hjelmeland.

This small village has an elementary school, a locally owned store (Joker Fister), a variety of local food options, small businesses, and an abundance of nature/hiking options. It is visited by many tourists each year and is famous for the beautiful nature and fishing in the fjords.

== History ==
The village of Fister was the administrative centre of the old Fister Municipality which existed from 1884 (when the old Hjelmeland og Fister Municipality was divided) until 1965 (when Fister Municipality was dissolved and merged into Hjelmeland Municipality and Finnøy Municipality).

Fister Church is located in the village. It was built in 1867 using plans drawn by the architect, Hans Linstow, who designed several churches in Norway, in addition to the Royal Palace, Oslo.
