= Nilsebuvatnet =

Lake in Rogaland, Norway

- Interactive map of Nilsebuvatnet
- Location: Ryfylke, Rogaland
- Coordinates: 59.17964°N 6.64587°E
- Basin countries: Norway
- Max. length: 4.5 kilometres (2.8 mi)
- Max. width: 1 kilometre (0.62 mi)
- Surface area: 2.47 km^{2} (0.95 sq mi)
- Water volume: 40 cubic megametres (1.4×10^{21} cu ft)
- Shore length^{1}: 13 kilometres (8.1 mi)
- Surface elevation: 721 metres (2,365 ft)
- References: NVE
- ^{1} Shore length is not a well-defined measure.

Nilsebuvatnet is a lake on the border of Sandnes Municipality and Hjelmeland Municipality in Rogaland county, Norway. The 2.47-square-kilometre (0.95 sq mi) lake lies in the Lyseheiane mountains about 13 kilometres (8.1 mi) north of the village of Lysebotn and about 25 kilometres (16 mi) east of the village of Årdal. The lake is regulated by a small dam on the southwest corner of the lake. The dam provides water for the Lysebotn power station. The lake drains out into the river Storåna which flows westward towards Årdal. The lake is accessible by a small service road from Lysebotn which leads up to the dam.

== See also ==
- List of lakes in Norway
