= Ritland crater =

Impact crater in Norway

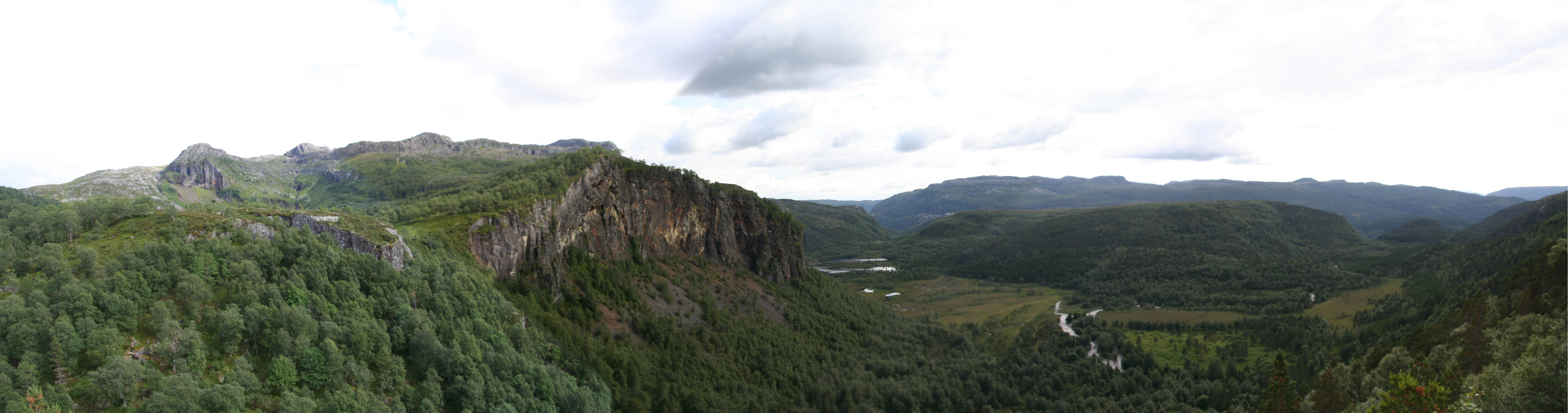
- Ritland crater

- Location within Rogaland Location within Norway
- Location: Hjelmeland Municipality, Rogaland, Norway; 59°14′47.66″N 6°25′17.43″E

Impact crater structure
- Confidence: Confirmed
- Diameter: 2 kilometres (1.2 mi)
- Age: 520 ± 20 Ma
- Exposed: Yes
- Drilled: No

The Ritland crater is an impact crater at Ritland farm in Hjelmeland Municipality in eastern Rogaland county, Norway. The crater is about 15 kilometres (9.3 mi) east of the village of Hjelmelandsvågen and about 8 kilometres (5.0 mi) south of the Jøsenfjorden. The crater is about 2 kilometres (1.2 mi) in diameter, and was created when a meteorite with an estimated diameter of 100 metres (330 ft) struck here about 500–600 million years ago. The crater was later buried by sediments, of which it has been partly recovered.

The structure was first discovered as a possible (suspected) impact crater in 2000 by geologist Fridtjof Riis. The Research Council of Norway has funded scientific research on the crater. In 2009, scientists from the University of Oslo considered it proven that the crater was formed by meteorite impact, according to Professor Henning Dypvik from the Institute for Geological Sciences at the University of Oslo.

== Details ==
The sediments and fossils at Ritland have been studied by geologists since the 1950s. The depth of the circular structure is about 350 metres (1,150 ft), with a diameter of about 2 kilometres (1.2 mi). Research has focused on trying to find evidence that the crater resulted from a meteoritic impact. In 2008 it was announced that microscopic evidence was found, and that the structure is an impact crater. The crater dates from before mid Cambrian, as fossils from mid Cambrian are found in sediments that have accumulated in the crater. The evidence for the structure being an impact crater stems from the identification of shocked quartz particles, which only form under the very high pressures (5-10 GPa) present during a meteoritic impact.

The sediments in the crater are described as landslides in the bottom of the crater, followed by shale sediments deposited during a period when the sea had invaded the area. On top of the clay sediments are coarser sediments. During the Caledonian orogeny the crater was buried under a several kilometre thick mountain chain. The overlaying mountains were later eroded, and the crater was again exposed.
