= Fister Municipality =

Former municipality in Rogaland, Norway

Fister Municipality Fister herad
- Former municipality
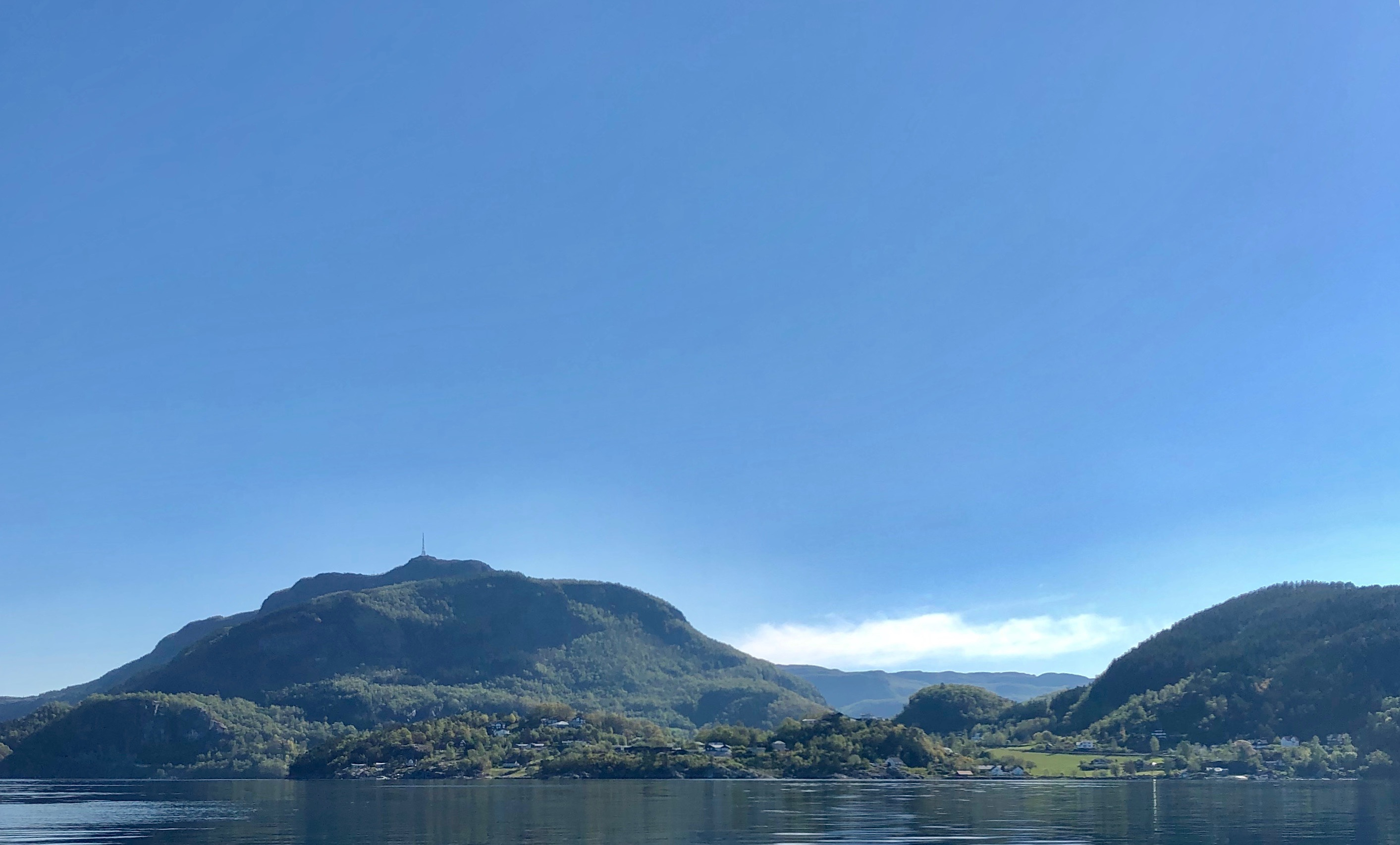
- View of Fister from the fjord

- Rogaland within Norway

- Fister within Rogaland
- Coordinates: 59°10′29″N 06°03′17″E
- Country: Norway
- County: Rogaland
- District: Ryfylke
- Established: 1 July 1884
  - Preceded by: Hjelmeland og Fister Municipality
- Disestablished: 1 Jan 1965
  - Succeeded by: Finnøy Municipality and Hjelmeland Municipality
- Administrative centre: Fister

Government
  - Mayor (1963–1964): Halvard Lid

Area (upon dissolution)
  - Total: 47.2 km^{2} (18.2 sq mi)
  - Rank: #470 in Norway
- Highest elevation: 502 m (1,647 ft)

Population (1964)
  - Total: 730
  - Rank: #505 in Norway
  - Density: 15.5/km^{2} (40/sq mi)
  - Change (10 years): ▼ −9%

Official language
  - Norwegian form: Nynorsk
- Time zone: UTC+01:00 (CET)
  - Summer (DST): UTC+02:00 (CEST)
- ISO 3166 code: NO-1132

Fister is a former municipality in Rogaland county, Norway. The 47.2-square-kilometre (18.2 sq mi) municipality existed from 1884 until its dissolution in 1965. The area is now divided between Stavanger Municipality and Hjelmeland Municipality in the traditional district of Ryfylke. The administrative centre was the village of Fister, where Fister Church is located.

Prior to its dissolution in 1965, the 47.2-square-kilometre (18.2 sq mi) municipality was the 470th largest by area out of the 525 municipalities in Norway. Fister Municipality was the 505th most populous municipality in Norway with a population of about 730. The municipality's population density was 15.5 inhabitants per square kilometre (40/sq mi) and its population had decreased by 9% over the previous 10-year period.

== General information ==
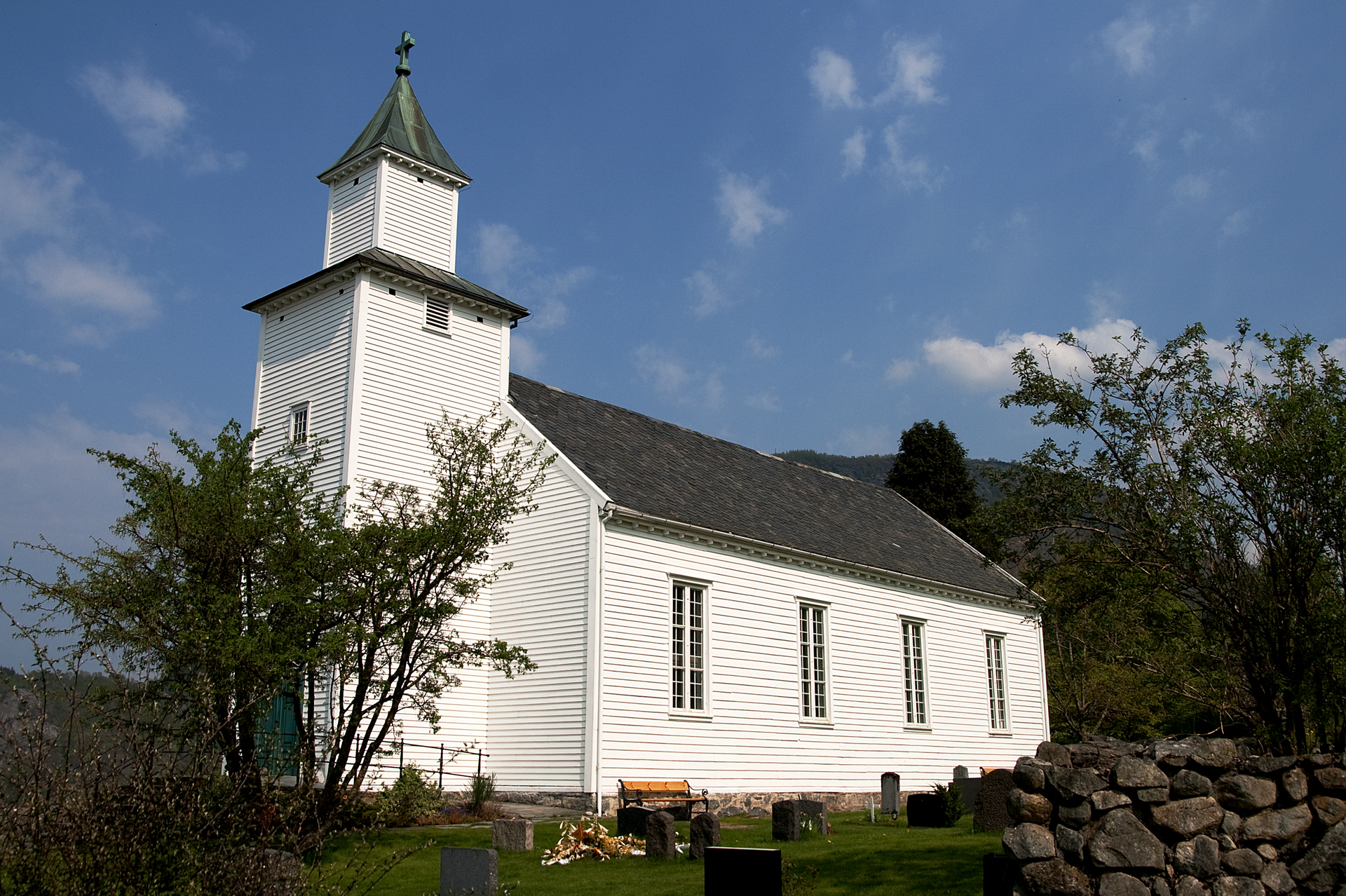
Fister Church

The municipality of Fister was established on 1 July 1884 when the large Hjelmeland og Fister Municipality was divided into two municipalities: the eastern district (population: 832) became the new Fister Municipality and the western district (population: 2,249) remained as a smaller Hjelmeland og Fister Municipality. At the same time, the name was changed to simply Hjelmeland Municipality, dropping the "Fister" part which was no longer part of the municipality.

During the 1960s, there were many municipal mergers across Norway due to the work of the Schei Committee. On 1 January 1965, the municipality of Fister was dissolved. The western part of Fister Municipality, known as the Fister islands (Fisterøyene), (population: 246) was merged into Finnøy Municipality. The rest of Fister Municipality was merged with the following areas to form a larger Hjelmeland Municipality:

- all of Hjelmeland Municipality (population: 1,691)
- the eastern part of Fister Municipality (population: 467), including the mainland and part of Randøy island
- most of Årdal Municipality (population: 743), except for the Sunngardene area which went to Strand Municipality
- the Buergården areas of Jelsa Municipality (population: 8)

=== Name ===
The municipality (originally the parish) is named after the old Fister farm (Old Norse: Fístr) since the first Fister Church was built there. The name probably comes from the word fístr which means "windy" or "hardy". It is probably related to the verb fise which means "to pass gas".

=== Churches ===
The Church of Norway had one parish (sokn) within Fister Municipality. At the time of the municipal dissolution, it was part of the Hjelmeland prestegjeld and the Ryfylke prosti (deanery) in the Diocese of Stavanger.

Churches in Fister Municipality
Parish (sokn)	Church name	Location of the church	Year built
Fister	Fister Church	Fister	1867

== Geography ==
The municipality encompassed the western coast of mainland along the Fisterfjorden plus the islands to the west of the mainland, including the western part of Randøy and Halsnøya. The highest point in the municipality was the 502-metre (1,647 ft) tall mountain Lauvåsen. Hjelmeland Municipality was located to the northeast, Årdal Municipality was located to the southeast, Strand Municipality was located to the south, Finnøy Municipality was located to the west, and Sjernarøy Municipality was located to the northwest.

== Government ==
While it existed, Fister Municipality was responsible for primary education (through 10th grade), outpatient health services, senior citizen services, welfare and other social services, zoning, economic development, and municipal roads and utilities. The municipality was governed by a municipal council of directly elected representatives. The mayor was indirectly elected by a vote of the municipal council. The municipality was under the jurisdiction of the Ryfylke District Court and the Gulating Court of Appeal.

=== Municipal council ===
The municipal council (Herredsstyre) of Fister Municipality was made up of 13 representatives that were elected to four year terms. The tables below show the historical composition of the council by political party.

Fister heradsstyre 1963–1964
Party name (in Nynorsk)	Number of representatives
Local List(s) (Lokale lister)	13
Total number of members:	13
Note: On 1 January 1965, Fister Municipality was divided between Hjelmeland Municipality and Finnøy Municipality.

Fister heradsstyre 1959–1963
Party name (in Nynorsk)	Number of representatives
Local List(s) (Lokale lister)	13
Total number of members:	13

Fister heradsstyre 1955–1959
Party name (in Nynorsk)	Number of representatives
Local List(s) (Lokale lister)	13
Total number of members:	13

Fister heradsstyre 1951–1955
Party name (in Nynorsk)	Number of representatives
Local List(s) (Lokale lister)	12
Total number of members:	12

Fister heradsstyre 1947–1951
Party name (in Nynorsk)	Number of representatives
Local List(s) (Lokale lister)	12
Total number of members:	12

Fister heradsstyre 1945–1947
Party name (in Nynorsk)	Number of representatives
Local List(s) (Lokale lister)	12
Total number of members:	12

Fister heradsstyre 1937–1941*
Party name (in Nynorsk)	Number of representatives
Local List(s) (Lokale lister)	12
Total number of members:	12
Note: Due to the German occupation of Norway during World War II, no elections were held for new municipal councils until after the war ended in 1945.

=== Mayors ===
The mayor (Nynorsk: ordførar) of Fister Municipality was the political leader of the municipality and the chairperson of the municipal council. The following people have held this position:

- 1885–1907: Ole Svendsen Sigmundstad
- 1908–1910: Ole Olsen Bjelland, Jr.
- 1911–1913: Per Olsen Mosnes
- 1914–1916: Ole Olsen Bjelland, Jr.
- 1917–1919: Thormod Øvrehus
- 1920–1922: Reidar Skår
- 1923–1928: Thormod Øvrehus
- 1929–1941: Thomas Thomsen
- 1942–1943: Lars A. Landsnes
- 1943–1945: Johannes Hovda
- 1945–1945: Thomas Thomsen
- 1945–1951: Halvard Lid
- 1951–1955: David Sørhus
- 1955–1957: Sigmund Sigmundstad
- 1957–1959: Halvard Lid
- 1959–1961: David Sørhus
- 1961–1963: Øystein Bergøy
- 1963–1964: Halvard Lid

== See also ==
- List of former municipalities of Norway
