= Lotherington =

Lotherington is a Norwegian surname. Notable people with the surname include:

- Trine Lotherington Danielsen (born 1967), Norwegian politician
- Tom Lotherington (1950–2026), Norwegian poet, novelist, biographer, and translator.
- Kenneth Lotherington Hutchings (1882–1916), English amateur cricketer
