= Ritland =

Ritland is a Norwegian language habitational surname. Notable people with the name include:

- Mike Ritland, American motivational speaker
- Osmond J. Ritland (1909–1991), United States Air Force general

== See also ==
- Ritland crater
