= Tysdalsvatnet =

Lake in Rogaland, Norway

- Tyssdalsvatnet
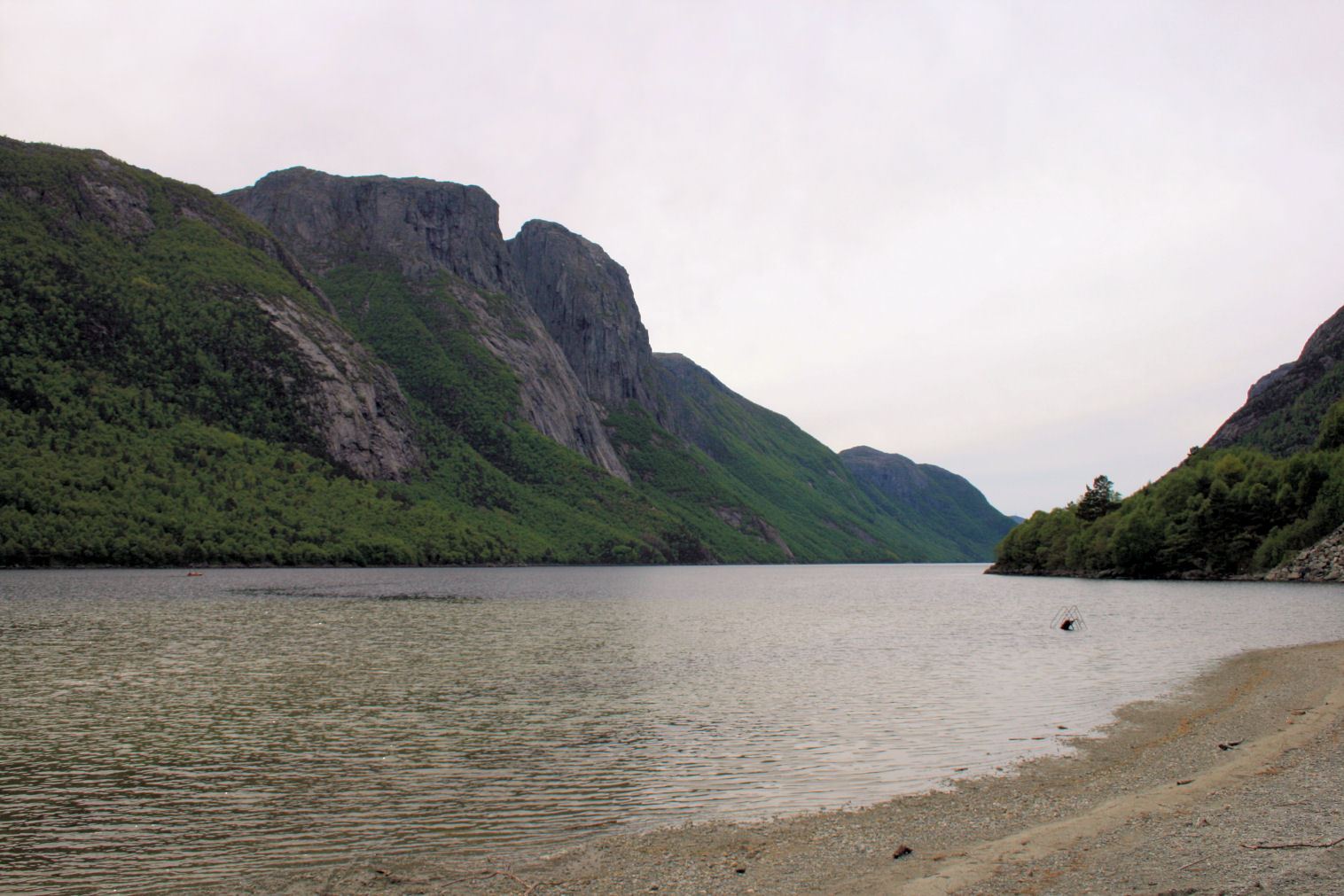
- Interactive map of Tysdalsvatnet
- Location: Ryfylke, Rogaland
- Coordinates: 59.08633°N 6.11165°E
- Basin countries: Norway
- Max. length: 6.5 kilometres (4.0 mi)
- Max. width: 800 metres (0.50 mi)
- Surface area: 3.74 km^{2} (1.44 sq mi)
- Shore length^{1}: 14.62 kilometres (9.08 mi)
- Surface elevation: 43 metres (141 ft)
- References: NVE
- ^{1} Shore length is not a well-defined measure.

Tysdalsvatnet is a lake in on the border of Hjelmeland Municipality and Strand Municipality in Rogaland county, Norway. The 3.74-square-kilometre (1.44 sq mi) lake lies about 5 kilometres (3.1 mi) south of the village of Årdal and about 8 kilometres (5.0 mi) east of the village of Tau. The Norwegian National Road 13 (Rv13) runs along the northern side of the lake. The Svo Tunnel was completed in 2013 and it routes much of Rv13 through a mountain rather than along the narrow shoreline of the lake.

== See also ==
- List of lakes in Norway
