= Jøsenfjorden (village) =

Village in Hjelmeland Municipality, Norway

- Village
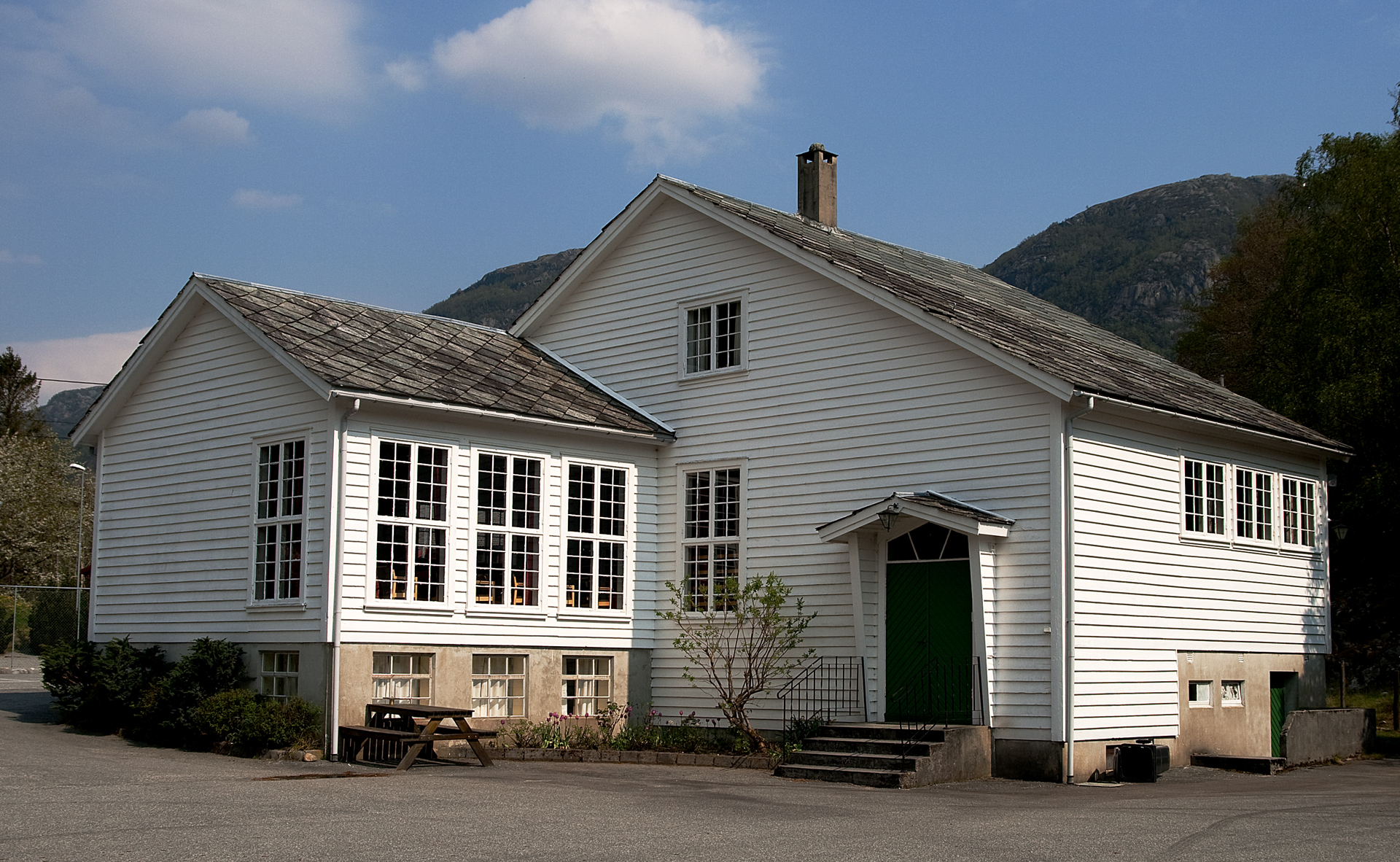
- View of the village chapel
- Interactive map of Jøsenfjorden
- Coordinates: 59.32894°N 6.44548°E
- Country: Norway
- Region: Western Norway
- County: Rogaland
- District: Ryfylke
- Municipality: Hjelmeland Municipality
- Elevation: 60 m (200 ft)
- Time zone: UTC+01:00 (CET)
  - Summer (DST): UTC+02:00 (CEST)
- Post Code: 4134 Jøsenfjorden

Jøsenfjorden is a village in Hjelmeland Municipality in Rogaland county, Norway. The village is located at the mouth of the river Ulla along the northern shore of the Jøsenfjorden. The village is one of the few settlements along the shores of this fjord. There is a small elementary school, shop, and chapel in the village.
