= Hjelmeland Municipality =

Municipality in Rogaland, Norway

Hjelmeland Municipality Hjelmeland kommune
- Municipality
- Hjelmeland og Fister herred (historic name)
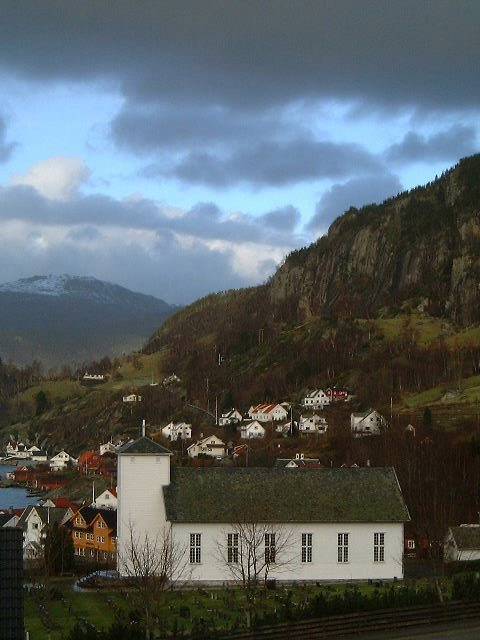
- View of the Hjelmeland Church

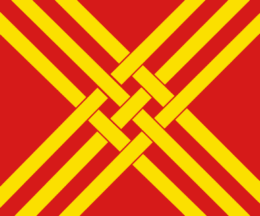
- Flag Coat of arms

- Rogaland within Norway

- Hjelmeland within Rogaland
- Coordinates: 59°13′02″N 06°20′27″E
- Country: Norway
- County: Rogaland
- District: Ryfylke
- Established: 1 Jan 1838
  - Created as: Formannskapsdistrikt
- Administrative centre: Hjelmeland

Government
  - Mayor (2022): Anita Husøy Riskedal (Sp)

Area
  - Total: 1,068.08 km^{2} (412.39 sq mi)
  - Land: 948.12 km^{2} (366.07 sq mi)
  - Water: 119.96 km^{2} (46.32 sq mi) 11.2%
  - Rank: #105 in Norway
- Highest elevation: 1,253.51 m (4,112.6 ft)

Population (2026)
  - Total: 2,612
  - Rank: #248 in Norway
  - Density: 2.4/km^{2} (6.2/sq mi)
  - Change (10 years): ▼ −4.6%
- Demonym: Hjelmelandsbu

Official language
  - Norwegian form: Nynorsk
- Time zone: UTC+01:00 (CET)
  - Summer (DST): UTC+02:00 (CEST)
- ISO 3166 code: NO-1133
- Website: Official website

Hjelmeland is a municipality in Rogaland county, Norway. It is located in the traditional district of Ryfylke. The administrative centre of the municipality is the village of Hjelmeland. Other villages in the municipality include Fister, Årdal, and Jøsenfjorden.

Hjelmeland Municipality is known for its fruit production (apples, pears, plums, cherries, and strawberries) and its fish production. Salmon has been important for the fish industry in Hjelmeland Municipality for a couple of decades, but white fish such as cod and halibut has increased its value in the latter years.

The 1,068.08-square-kilometre (412.39 sq mi) municipality is the 105th largest by area out of the 357 municipalities in Norway. Hjelmeland Municipality is the 248th most populous municipality in Norway with a population of 2,612. The municipality's population density is 2.4 inhabitants per square kilometre (6.2/sq mi) and its population has decreased by 4.6% over the previous 10-year period.

== General information ==
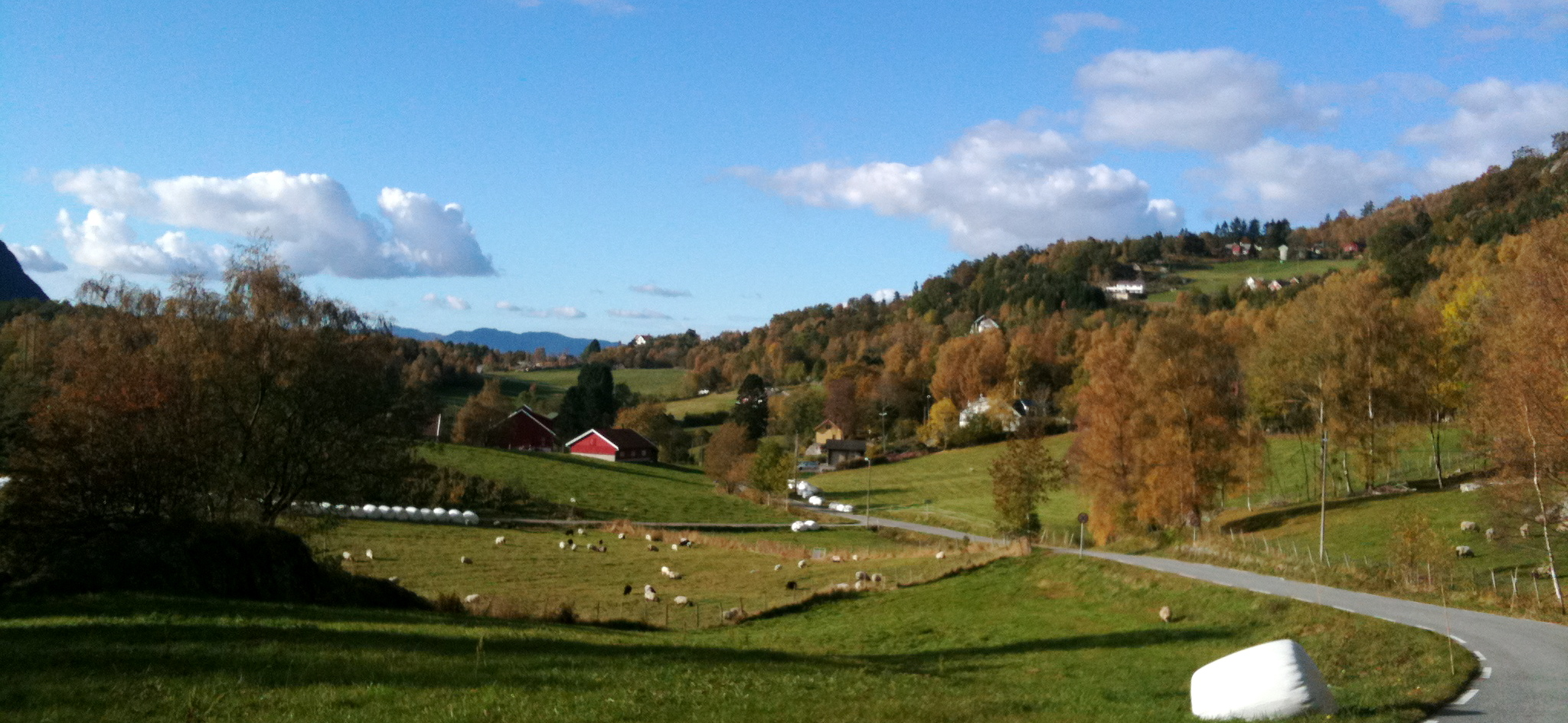
View of the Hjelmeland countryside

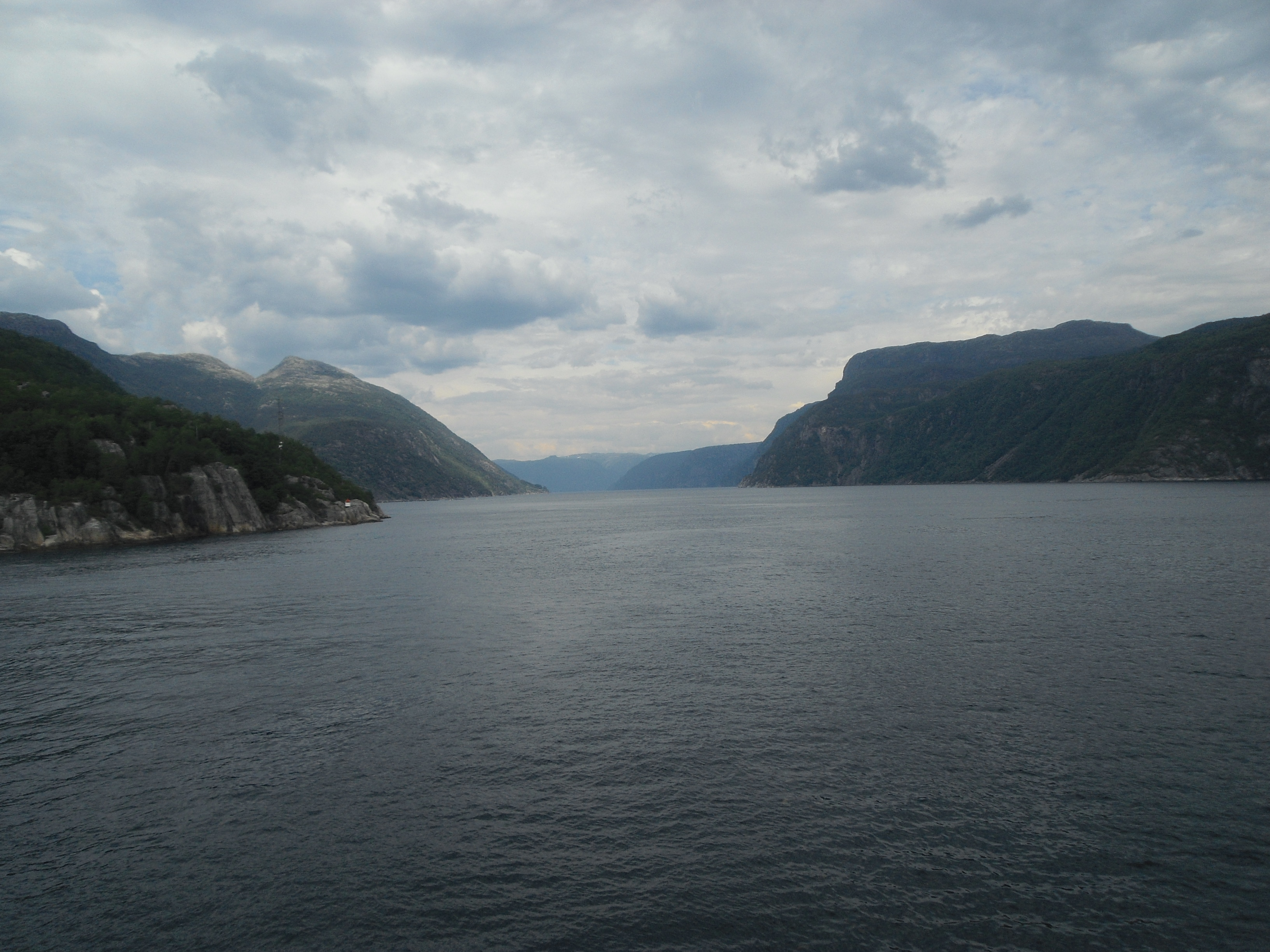
View of the Jøsenfjorden

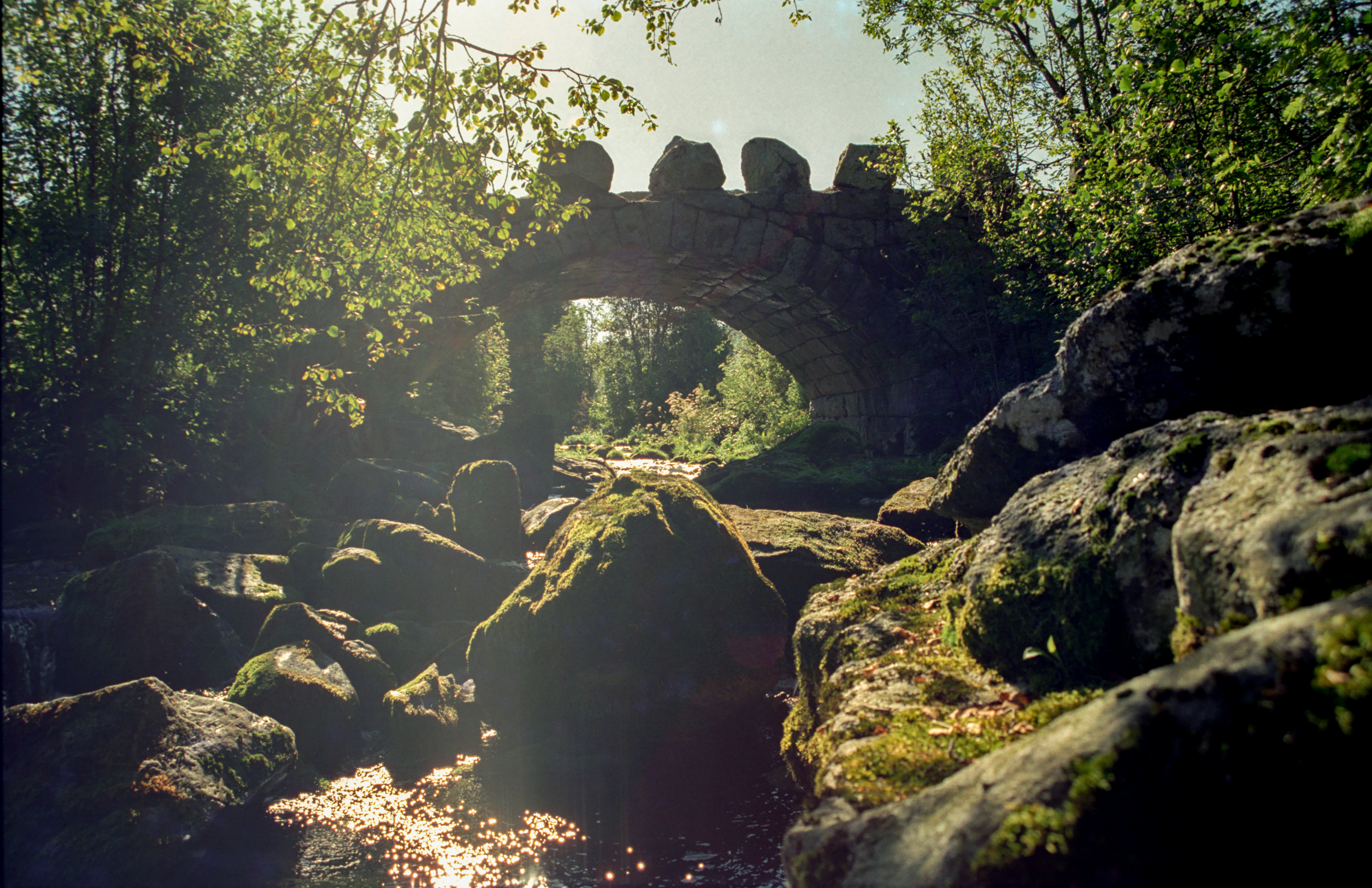
View of an old stone bridge in Hjelmeland

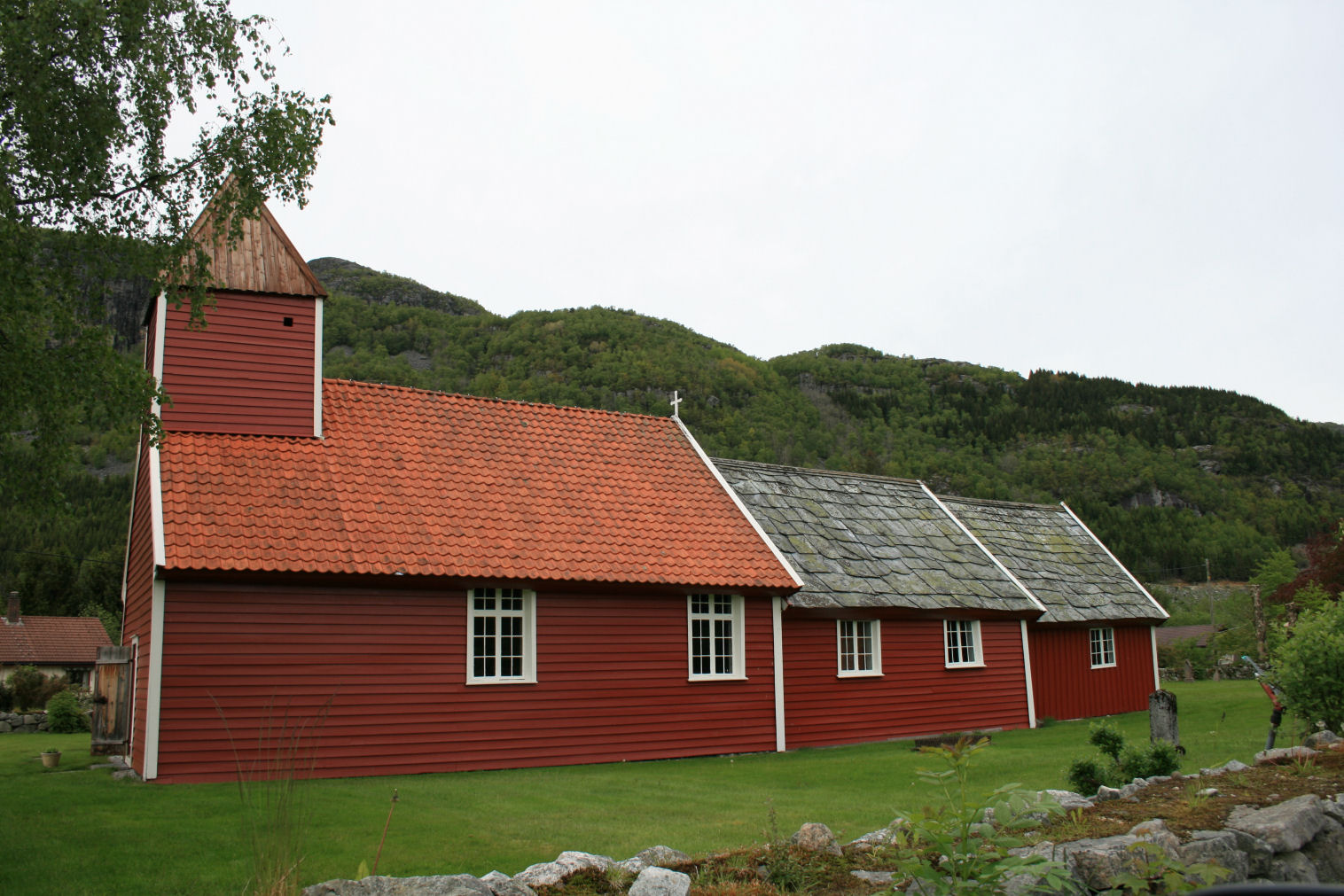
View of the Old Årdal Church

The parish of Hjelmeland was established as a municipality on 1 January 1838 (see formannskapsdistrikt law). In 1859, the large Hjelmeland Municipality was divided into two: the southern portion of the municipality (population: 1,315) was split off to form the new Aardal Municipality and the remainder of the municipality (population: 3,084) remained as a smaller Hjelmeland Municipality which was also renamed as Hjelmeland og Fister Municipality.

On 1 July 1884, Hjelmeland og Fister Municipality was divided into two municipalities: the western islands and the western coast of the mainland (population: 832) became the new Fister Municipality and the remaining eastern district of the municipality (population: 2,249) was renamed as simply Hjelmeland Municipality.

During the 1960s, there were many municipal mergers across Norway due to the work of the Schei Committee. On 1 January 1965, the following areas were merged to form a much larger Hjelmeland Municipality (population: 2,909; nearly doubling the size of the municipal population):

- all of the old Hjelmeland Municipality (population: 1,691)
- the eastern part of Fister Municipality (population: 467), including the mainland and part of Randøy island
- most of Årdal Municipality (population: 743), except for the Sunngardene area which went to Strand Municipality
- the Buergården area on the island of Ombo from Jelsa Municipality (population: 8)

On 1 January 2020 a major municipal merger took place to the west of Hjelmeland Municipality. As part of this merger, the parts of Hjelmeland Municipality that were located on the island of Ombo were transferred to the newly-enlarged Stavanger Municipality so that the whole island would be part of the same municipality.

=== Name ===
The municipality (originally the parish) is named after the old Hjelmeland farm (Old Norse: Hjalmaland) since the first Hjelmeland Church was built there. Today the farm is a part of the Hjelmelandsvågen urban area. The first element of the name is the plural genitive case of hjalmr which means "helmet" (likely referring to two hills behind the farm which have the form of two helmets). The last element is land which means "land" or "farm".

=== Coat of arms ===
The coat of arms was granted on 30 November 1984. The official blazon is "Gules, a triple saltire fretty Or" (Norwegian: På raud grunn ein gull Andreaskross, laga med trilling strengar). This means the arms have a red field (background) and the charge is a set of three interwoven St. Andrew's crosses. The charge has a tincture of Or which means it is commonly colored yellow, but if it is made out of metal, then gold is used. They are based on the local tradition of making chairs and other furniture with seats of woven twigs (jærstoler). The process of weaving is symbolised in the arms. At the same time the arms show the strength and solidarity of the municipality. Furthermore, there are three sets of crosses to represent the fact that Hjelmeland is made up of three previous municipalities (Hjemeland, Fister, and Årdal) that were merged in 1965. The arms were designed by Svein Magnus Håvarstein who based the idea from an initial idea by Magnus Torgersen. The municipal flag has the same design as the coat of arms.

=== Churches ===
The Church of Norway has three parishes (sokn) within Hjelmeland Municipality. It is part of the Ryfylke prosti (deanery) in the Diocese of Stavanger.

Churches in Hjelmeland Municipality
| Parish (sokn) | Church name | Location of the church | Year built |
|---|---|---|---|
| Fister | Fister Church | Fister | 1867 |
| Hjelmeland | Hjelmeland Church | Hjelmeland | 1858 |
| Årdal | Årdal Church | Årdal | 1919 |
| Årdal | Old Årdal Church | Årdal | 1619 |

== Geography ==
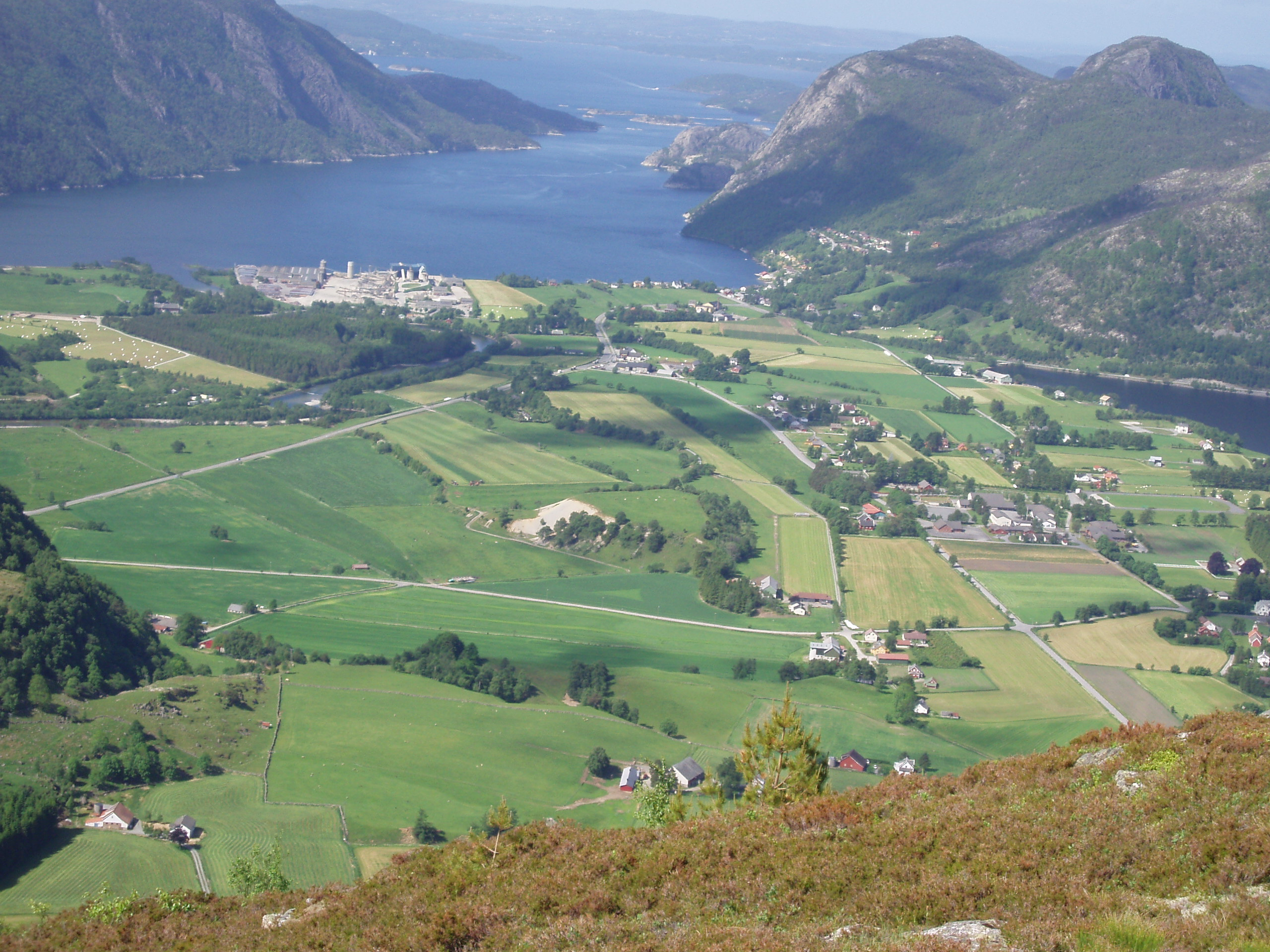
View of Årdal

The municipality stretches from the mountains bordering the Setesdal valley to the shores of the fjords that connect to the main Boknafjorden. The highest point in the municipality is the 1,253.51-metre (4,112.6 ft) tall peak in the eastern part of the municipality. The small Jøsenfjorden and Årdalsfjorden cut into the mainland. There are several islands that are part of Hjelmeland including Randøy as well as some smaller surrounding islands. The island of Randøy is connected to the mainland by the Randøy Bridge.

There are several large lakes in the municipality including Nilsebuvatnet, Øvre Tysdalsvatnet, and Tysdalsvatnet. The large lake Blåsjø partially lies in the municipality. The Trollgarden glacial moraine lies atop a mountain in Hjelmeland. The Ritland crater is also located in the municipality.

Suldal Municipality is located to the north, Bykle Municipality (in Agder county) is located to the east, Sandnes Municipality is located to the southeast, Strand Municipality is located to the southwest, and Stavanger Municipality is located to the west.

== Government ==
Hjelmeland Municipality is responsible for primary education (through 10th grade), outpatient health services, senior citizen services, welfare and other social services, zoning, economic development, and municipal roads and utilities. The municipality is governed by a municipal council of directly elected representatives. The mayor is indirectly elected by a vote of the municipal council. The municipality is under the jurisdiction of the Sør-Rogaland District Court and the Gulating Court of Appeal.

=== Municipal council ===
The municipal council (Kommunestyre) of Hjelmeland Municipality is made up of 19 representatives that are elected to four year terms. The tables below show the current and historical composition of the council by political party.

Hjelmeland kommunestyre 2023–2027
| Party name (in Nynorsk) | Number of representatives |
|---|---|
| Labour Party (Arbeidarpartiet) | 2 |
| Conservative Party (Høgre) | 5 |
| Christian Democratic Party (Kristeleg Folkeparti) | 2 |
| Centre Party (Senterpartiet) | 9 |
| Socialist Left Party (Sosialistisk Venstreparti) | 1 |
| Total number of members: | 19 |

Hjelmeland kommunestyre 2019–2023
| Party name (in Nynorsk) | Number of representatives |
|---|---|
| Labour Party (Arbeidarpartiet) | 2 |
| Green Party (Miljøpartiet Dei Grøne) | 1 |
| Conservative Party (Høgre) | 4 |
| Christian Democratic Party (Kristeleg Folkeparti) | 2 |
| Centre Party (Senterpartiet) | 9 |
| Socialist Left Party (Sosialistisk Venstreparti) | 1 |
| Total number of members: | 19 |

Hjelmeland kommunestyre 2015–2019
| Party name (in Nynorsk) | Number of representatives |
|---|---|
| Labour Party (Arbeidarpartiet) | 3 |
| Conservative Party (Høgre) | 5 |
| Christian Democratic Party (Kristeleg Folkeparti) | 4 |
| Centre Party (Senterpartiet) | 6 |
| Liberal Party (Venstre) | 1 |
| Total number of members: | 19 |

Hjelmeland kommunestyre 2011–2015
| Party name (in Nynorsk) | Number of representatives |
|---|---|
| Labour Party (Arbeidarpartiet) | 2 |
| Progress Party (Framstegspartiet) | 1 |
| Conservative Party (Høgre) | 5 |
| Christian Democratic Party (Kristeleg Folkeparti) | 4 |
| Centre Party (Senterpartiet) | 5 |
| Socialist Left Party (Sosialistisk Venstreparti) | 1 |
| Liberal Party (Venstre) | 1 |
| Total number of members: | 19 |

Hjelmeland kommunestyre 2007–2011
| Party name (in Nynorsk) | Number of representatives |
|---|---|
| Labour Party (Arbeidarpartiet) | 3 |
| Progress Party (Framstegspartiet) | 1 |
| Conservative Party (Høgre) | 2 |
| Christian Democratic Party (Kristeleg Folkeparti) | 4 |
| Centre Party (Senterpartiet) | 7 |
| Socialist Left Party (Sosialistisk Venstreparti) | 1 |
| Liberal Party (Venstre) | 1 |
| Total number of members: | 19 |

Hjelmeland kommunestyre 2003–2007
| Party name (in Nynorsk) | Number of representatives |
|---|---|
| Labour Party (Arbeidarpartiet) | 2 |
| Progress Party (Framstegspartiet) | 1 |
| Conservative Party (Høgre) | 3 |
| Christian Democratic Party (Kristeleg Folkeparti) | 5 |
| Centre Party (Senterpartiet) | 5 |
| Socialist Left Party (Sosialistisk Venstreparti) | 1 |
| Liberal Party (Venstre) | 2 |
| Total number of members: | 19 |

Hjelmeland kommunestyre 1999–2003
| Party name (in Nynorsk) | Number of representatives |
|---|---|
| Labour Party (Arbeidarpartiet) | 1 |
| Progress Party (Framstegspartiet) | 1 |
| Conservative Party (Høgre) | 2 |
| Christian Democratic Party (Kristeleg Folkeparti) | 6 |
| Centre Party (Senterpartiet) | 5 |
| Joint list of the Liberal Party and independents (Fellesliste: Venstre og uavhengige) | 4 |
| Total number of members: | 19 |

Hjelmeland kommunestyre 1995–1999
| Party name (in Nynorsk) | Number of representatives |
|---|---|
| Labour Party (Arbeidarpartiet) | 2 |
| Conservative Party (Høgre) | 4 |
| Christian Democratic Party (Kristeleg Folkeparti) | 5 |
| Centre Party (Senterpartiet) | 9 |
| Socialist Left Party (Sosialistisk Venstreparti) | 1 |
| Liberal Party (Venstre) | 4 |
| Total number of members: | 25 |

Hjelmeland kommunestyre 1991–1995
| Party name (in Nynorsk) | Number of representatives |
|---|---|
| Labour Party (Arbeidarpartiet) | 2 |
| Progress Party (Framstegspartiet) | 1 |
| Conservative Party (Høgre) | 3 |
| Christian Democratic Party (Kristeleg Folkeparti) | 6 |
| Centre Party (Senterpartiet) | 10 |
| Socialist Left Party (Sosialistisk Venstreparti) | 1 |
| Hjelmeland local party (Hjelmeland bygdeparti) | 2 |
| Total number of members: | 25 |

Hjelmeland kommunestyre 1987–1991
| Party name (in Nynorsk) | Number of representatives |
|---|---|
| Labour Party (Arbeidarpartiet) | 3 |
| Progress Party (Framstegspartiet) | 1 |
| Conservative Party (Høgre) | 4 |
| Christian Democratic Party (Kristeleg Folkeparti) | 7 |
| Centre Party (Senterpartiet) | 8 |
| Cross-party list (Tverrpolitisk liste) | 2 |
| Total number of members: | 25 |

Hjelmeland kommunestyre 1983–1987
| Party name (in Nynorsk) | Number of representatives |
|---|---|
| Labour Party (Arbeidarpartiet) | 2 |
| Progress Party (Framstegspartiet) | 1 |
| Conservative Party (Høgre) | 4 |
| Christian Democratic Party (Kristeleg Folkeparti) | 7 |
| Centre Party (Senterpartiet) | 9 |
| Cross-party list (Tverrpolitisk liste) | 2 |
| Total number of members: | 25 |

Hjelmeland kommunestyre 1979–1983
| Party name (in Nynorsk) | Number of representatives |
|---|---|
| Labour Party (Arbeidarpartiet) | 2 |
| Conservative Party (Høgre) | 5 |
| Christian Democratic Party (Kristeleg Folkeparti) | 7 |
| New People's Party (Nye Folkepartiet) | 1 |
| Centre Party (Senterpartiet) | 9 |
| Joint list of the Progress Party and Non-party Group (Framstaggspartiet og Upolitisk Gruppe) | 1 |
| Total number of members: | 25 |

Hjelmeland kommunestyre 1975–1979
| Party name (in Nynorsk) | Number of representatives |
|---|---|
| Labour Party (Arbeidarpartiet) | 2 |
| Conservative Party (Høgre) | 2 |
| Christian Democratic Party (Kristeleg Folkeparti) | 7 |
| New People's Party (Nye Folkepartiet) | 2 |
| Centre Party (Senterpartiet) | 11 |
| Joint list of the Liberal Party and independents (Venstre og Upolitisk) | 1 |
| Total number of members: | 25 |

Hjelmeland kommunestyre 1971–1975
| Party name (in Nynorsk) | Number of representatives |
|---|---|
| Labour Party (Arbeidarpartiet) | 2 |
| Christian Democratic Party (Kristeleg Folkeparti) | 6 |
| Centre Party (Senterpartiet) | 10 |
| Liberal Party (Venstre) | 5 |
| Local List(s) (Lokale lister) | 2 |
| Total number of members: | 25 |

Hjelmeland kommunestyre 1967–1971
| Party name (in Nynorsk) | Number of representatives |
|---|---|
| Labour Party (Arbeidarpartiet) | 2 |
| Christian Democratic Party (Kristeleg Folkeparti) | 5 |
| Centre Party (Senterpartiet) | 10 |
| Liberal Party (Venstre) | 5 |
| Local List(s) (Lokale lister) | 3 |
| Total number of members: | 25 |

Hjelmeland kommunestyre 1963–1967
| Party name (in Nynorsk) | Number of representatives |
|---|---|
| Labour Party (Arbeidarpartiet) | 2 |
| Christian Democratic Party (Kristeleg Folkeparti) | 3 |
| Centre Party (Senterpartiet) | 7 |
| Liberal Party (Venstre) | 4 |
| Local List(s) (Lokale lister) | 1 |
| Total number of members: | 17 |

Hjelmeland heradsstyre 1959–1963
| Party name (in Nynorsk) | Number of representatives |
|---|---|
| Labour Party (Arbeidarpartiet) | 2 |
| Christian Democratic Party (Kristeleg Folkeparti) | 1 |
| Local List(s) (Lokale lister) | 10 |
| Total number of members: | 13 |

Hjelmeland heradsstyre 1955–1959
| Party name (in Nynorsk) | Number of representatives |
|---|---|
| Christian Democratic Party (Kristeleg Folkeparti) | 3 |
| Farmers' Party (Bondepartiet) | 8 |
| Liberal Party (Venstre) | 3 |
| Local List(s) (Lokale lister) | 3 |
| Total number of members: | 17 |

Hjelmeland heradsstyre 1951–1955
| Party name (in Nynorsk) | Number of representatives |
|---|---|
| Christian Democratic Party (Kristeleg Folkeparti) | 2 |
| Farmers' Party (Bondepartiet) | 6 |
| Liberal Party (Venstre) | 4 |
| Local List(s) (Lokale lister) | 4 |
| Total number of members: | 16 |

Hjelmeland heradsstyre 1947–1951
| Party name (in Nynorsk) | Number of representatives |
|---|---|
| Labour Party (Arbeidarpartiet) | 2 |
| Conservative Party (Høgre) | 1 |
| Christian Democratic Party (Kristeleg Folkeparti) | 3 |
| Farmers' Party (Bondepartiet) | 5 |
| Liberal Party (Venstre) | 5 |
| Total number of members: | 16 |

Hjelmeland heradsstyre 1945–1947
| Party name (in Nynorsk) | Number of representatives |
|---|---|
| Labour Party (Arbeidarpartiet) | 4 |
| Joint List(s) of Non-Socialist Parties (Borgarlege Felleslister) | 4 |
| Local List(s) (Lokale lister) | 8 |
| Total number of members: | 16 |

Hjelmeland heradsstyre 1937–1941*
| Party name (in Nynorsk) | Number of representatives |
|---|---|
| Joint List(s) of Non-Socialist Parties (Borgarlege Felleslister) | 8 |
| Local List(s) (Lokale lister) | 8 |
| Total number of members: | 16 |
Note: Due to the German occupation of Norway during World War II, no elections were held for new municipal councils until after the war ended in 1945.

=== Mayors ===
The mayor (Nynorsk: ordførar) of Hjelmeland Municipality is the political leader of the municipality and the chairperson of the municipal council. The following people have held this position:

- 1838–1843: Andreas Sandsberg
- 1844–1847: Rev. Johan Gottleib Thaulow
- 1848–1851: Andreas Sandsberg
- 1852–1853: Svend S. Sigmundstad
- 1854–1854: Peder Thorsen
- 1855–1859: Ole Thorsen
- 1860–1861: Ole Christensen Selvaag
- 1862–1863: Haldor Gundersen Fister
- 1864–1865: Samson Samsonsen Byhrøe
- 1866–1869: Ole Olsen Bjelland
- 1870–1873: Ole Svendsen Sigmundstad
- 1874–1877: Ole Olsen Bjelland
- 1878–1880: Svend Thorsen
- 1880–1881: Ole Svendsen Sigmundstad
- 1882–1889: Orm Olsen Tytlandsvig
- 1890–1893: Daniel Halvorsen
- 1894–1897: Hans Olsen
- 1898–1898: Daniel Halvorsen
- 1899–1899: Hans Olsen
- 1900–1901: Daniel Halvorsen
- 1902–1907: Lorentz Østensen
- 1908–1916: Nils N. Hauge
- 1917–1931: Johannes J. Laugaland
- 1931–1941: Johne Mæland
- 1942–1945: Lars A. Landsnes
- 1945–1945: Johne Mæland
- 1946–1947: Andreas O. Hauge
- 1948–1951: Kristian Hauge
- 1952–1957: Georg Vika
- 1958–1959: Kristian Hauge
- 1960–1963: Georg Vika
- 1964–1965: Jone J. Vadla
- 1966–1967: Tårn Schmidt
- 1968–1969: Georg Vika
- 1970–1979: Arne Hetlelid (KrF)
- 1979–1989: Ole J. Hagalid (Sp)
- 1990–1991: Håkon Helgøy
- 1991–1995: Terje Borgen (Sp)
- 1995–2007: Terje Thornquist (KrF)
- 2007–2011: Bjørn Laugaland (Sp)
- 2011–2015: Trine L. Danielsen (H)
- 2015–2022: Bjørn Laugaland (Sp)
- 2022–present: Anita Husøy Riskedal (Sp)

== Notable people ==
- Jacob Tostrup (1806 in Hjelmeland – 1890), a jeweller, goldsmith, and silversmith
- Per Hovda (1908 in Hjelmeland – 1997), a philologist
- Per Pedersen Tjøstland (1918 in Fister - 2004), a Norwegian Nazi activist and SS volunteer
- Kjell Erfjord (born 1940 in Hjelmeland), an educator and politician who was mayor of Lund Municipality from 1981-1991 and 1999-2007
