= Trine Lotherington Danielsen =

Norwegian politician (born 1967)

Trine Lotherington Danielsen (born 9 March 1967) is a Norwegian politician for the Conservative Party.

Danielsen grew up in Singsaker in the city of Trondheim. She worked in the aquaculture industry as a head of production for Timar Group in Portugal, consultant for EWOS and managing director of CAC and the Blue Planet Academy. From 2011 to 2015 she served as the mayor of Hjelmeland Municipality.

She was elected as a deputy representative to the Parliament of Norway from Rogaland for the term 2017–2021. In total she met during 12 days of parliamentary session. In the 2021 election she desired renomination, but only managed to win a 17th slot.

In February 2020 she was appointed to Solberg's Cabinet as a State Secretary for the Minister of Fisheries in the Ministry of Trade, Industry and Fisheries. She served as a State Secretary until Solberg's Cabinet fell in October 2021.
