= Fister Church =

Church in Rogaland, Norway

- Fister kyrkje
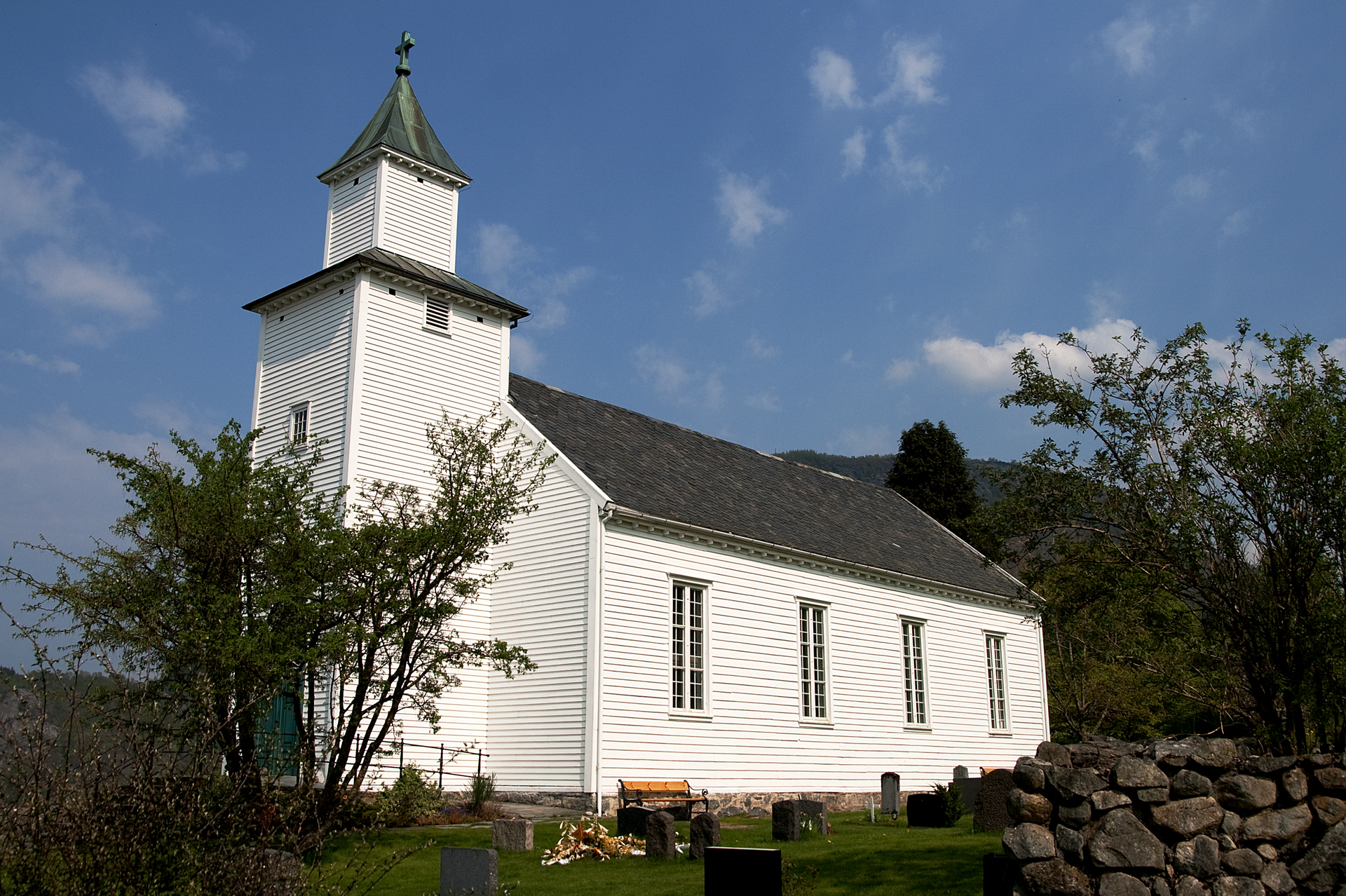
- View of the church
- Fister Church
- 59.175699°N 6.062656°E
- Location: Hjelmeland Municipality, Rogaland
- Country: Norway
- Denomination: Church of Norway
- Churchmanship: Evangelical Lutheran

History
- Status: Parish church
- Founded: 13th century
- Consecrated: 1867

Architecture
- Functional status: Active
- Architect: Hans Linstow
- Architectural type: Long church
- Completed: 1867

Specifications
- Capacity: 200
- Materials: Wood

Administration
- Diocese: Stavanger bispedømme
- Deanery: Ryfylke prosti
- Parish: Fister
- Norwegian Cultural Heritage Site
- Type: Church
- Status: Protected
- ID: 84142

Fister Church (Norwegian: Fister kirke) is a parish church of the Church of Norway in Hjelmeland Municipality in Rogaland county, Norway. It is located in the village of Fister. It is the church for the Fister parish which is part of the Ryfylke prosti (deanery) in the Diocese of Stavanger. The white, wooden church was built in a long church design in 1867 using designs by the architect Hans Linstow. The church seats about 200 people.

== History ==
The earliest existing historical records of the church date back to the year 1300, but it was likely built some time before that. The first church was probably a stave church, located immediately to the west of the present building. In the year 1300, the priest of Fister was involved in a conflict between the Bishop of Stavanger and his canon. The priest of Fister, along with 3 other nearby priests were fined for illegally banning a number of Hird men from the church. In 1867, a new church was constructed immediately to the east of the old church. After the new church was completed, the old church was torn down and its materials were sold at auction.

== See also ==
- List of churches in Rogaland
