= Joker (store) =

Norwegian supermarket chain

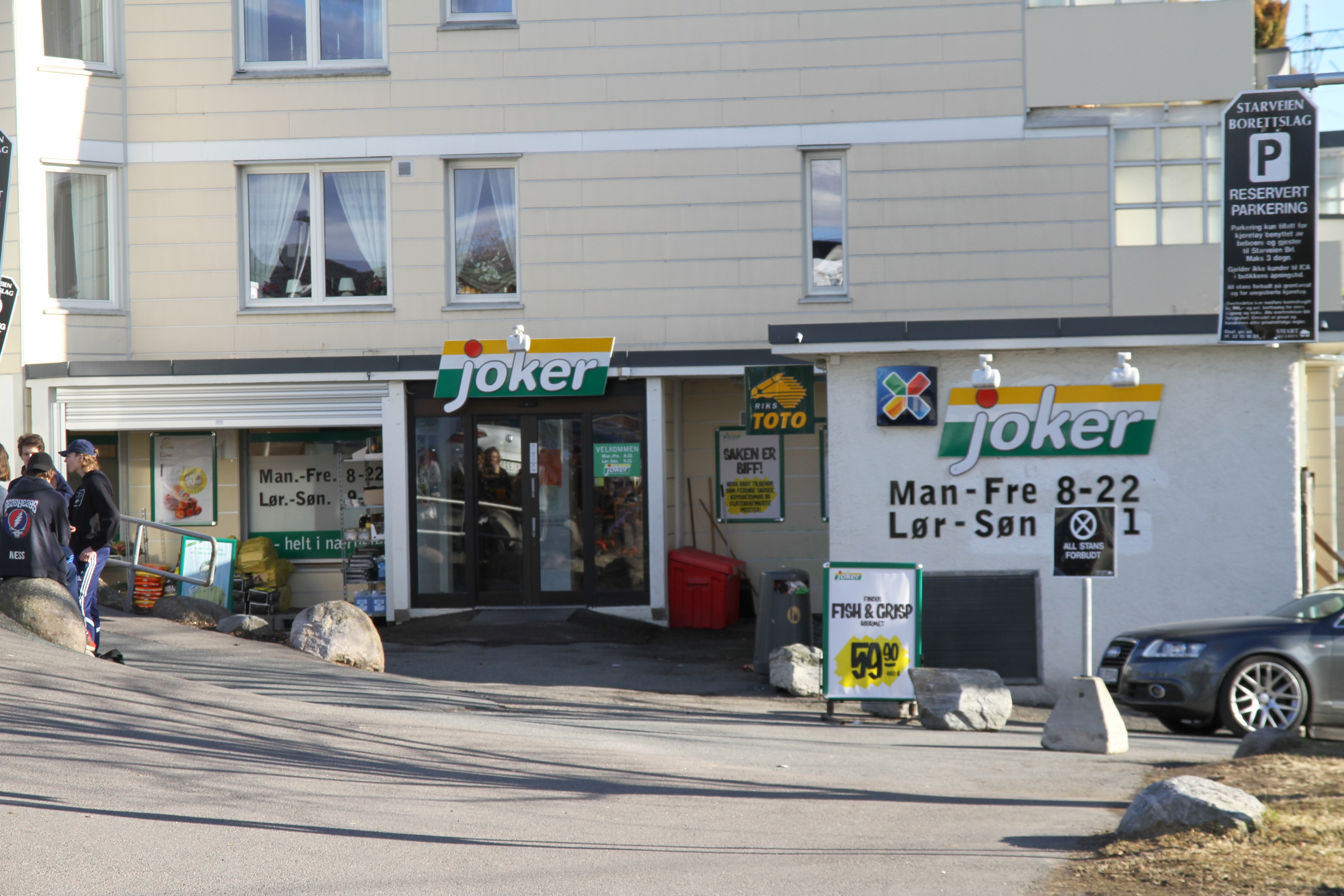
Joker in Oslo

Joker is a Norwegian grocery store chain in partnership with Norgesgruppen. The chain was established with its current name in 1997, rebranding a number of local stores, including those in the former "Nærmat" and "Lønne" chains.

== Store profile ==
The chain has about 450 outlets, many of which are small convenience stores with a floor area of less than 100 m^{2} (1000 sq. ft.) thus allowing them to remain open on Sundays. After complaints by REMA 1000, a review of the stores in 2016 found that some of them were too large to operate legally on Sundays. Norgesgruppen took steps to close or reorganize the store layout to bring them into compliance with the law.

The marketing images the stores as being run by "the local grocer on the corner". A price test found that items purchased from Joker are about 15% more expensive than at discount chains although still cheaper than items purchased from kiosks or gas stations. The smaller shop size also makes the selection more limited. Joker stores compete by being located in areas distant from larger stores.

The store has an annual turnover of about NOK 6 billion. The turnover each Sunday is NOK 10-12 million.
