= Old Årdal Church =

Church in Rogaland, Norway

- Årdal gamle kyrkje
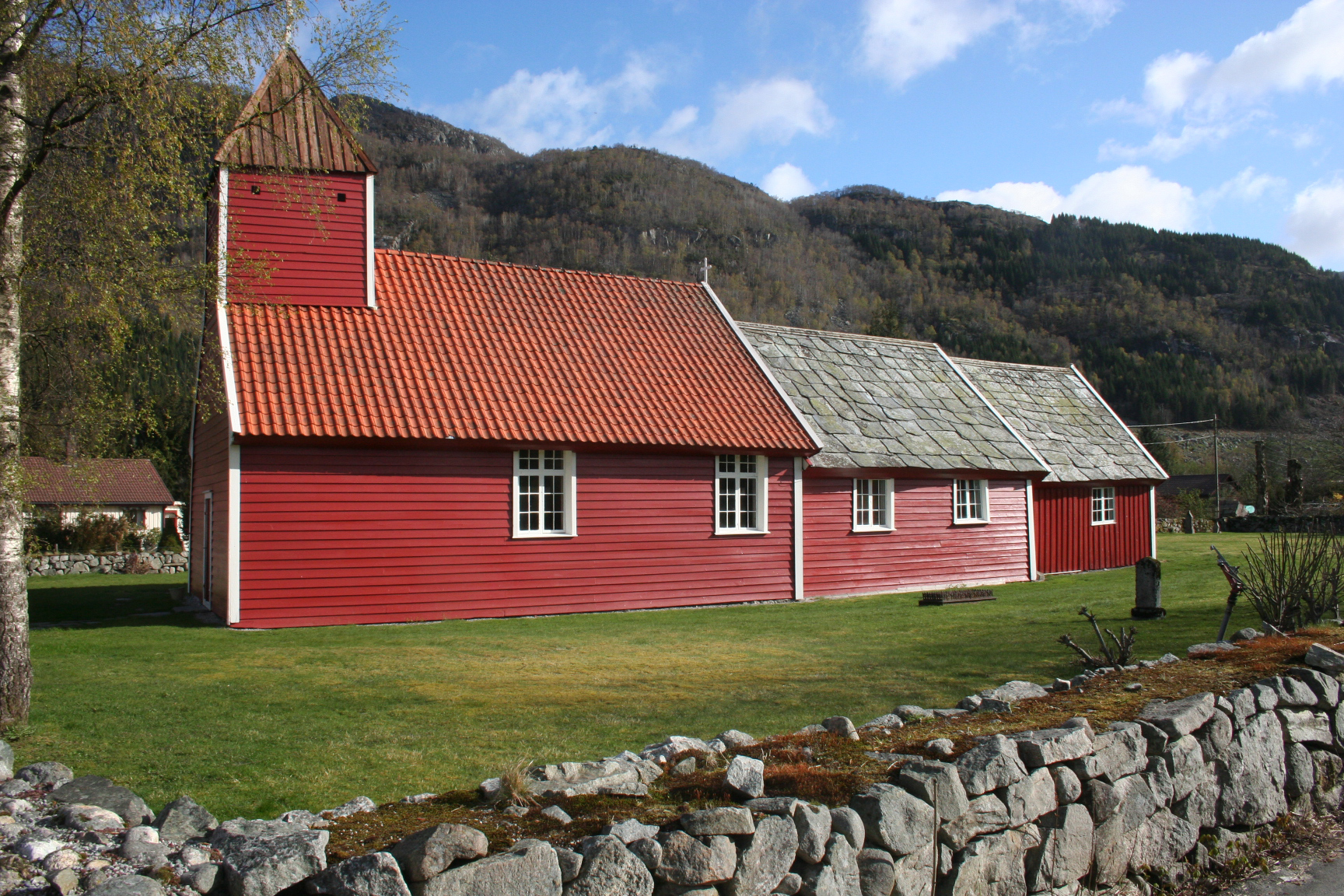
- View of the church
- Old Årdal Church
- 59.157538°N 6.199596°E
- Location: Hjelmeland Municipality, Rogaland
- Country: Norway
- Denomination: Church of Norway
- Churchmanship: Evangelical Lutheran

History
- Status: Parish church
- Founded: 13th century
- Consecrated: 1620

Architecture
- Functional status: Active
- Architectural type: Long church
- Groundbreaking: 1619
- Completed: 1620

Specifications
- Capacity: 175
- Materials: Wood

Administration
- Diocese: Stavanger bispedømme
- Deanery: Ryfylke prosti
- Parish: Årdal
- Norwegian Cultural Heritage Site
- Type: Church
- Status: Automatically protected
- ID: 85978

Old Årdal Church (Norwegian: Årdal gamle kirke) is a historic parish church of the Church of Norway in Hjelmeland Municipality in Rogaland county, Norway. It is located in the village of Årdal. It used to be the church for the Årdal parish (but now it is rarely used) which is part of the Ryfylke prosti (deanery) in the Diocese of Stavanger. The red, wooden church was built in a long church design in 1620 using designs by an unknown architect. The church seats about 175 people.

== History ==
The earliest existing historical records of the church date back to the year 1308, but the stave church was likely built during the 13th century. The church was torn down in 1619 and a new church was built on the same site. The new church was consecrated in 1620. The new building was constructed using some of the reused materials from the previous church on the same general site. Part of the foundation under the southwest corner of the church was the same foundation for the medieval stave church.

The church served this area from its completion date in 1620 until 1919 when the new Årdal Church was completed about 600 metres (2,000 ft) to the southwest. Since that time, the old church has no longer been used regularly, but it has been used for special occasions such as weddings and concerts. There are still two regularly scheduled worship services held at the church each year, one service on Olsok and one other Sunday morning in the summer. The interior of the church is decorated with hand-painted rosemåling; the altarpiece and the pulpit are by Gottfried Hendtzchel.

== Media gallery ==
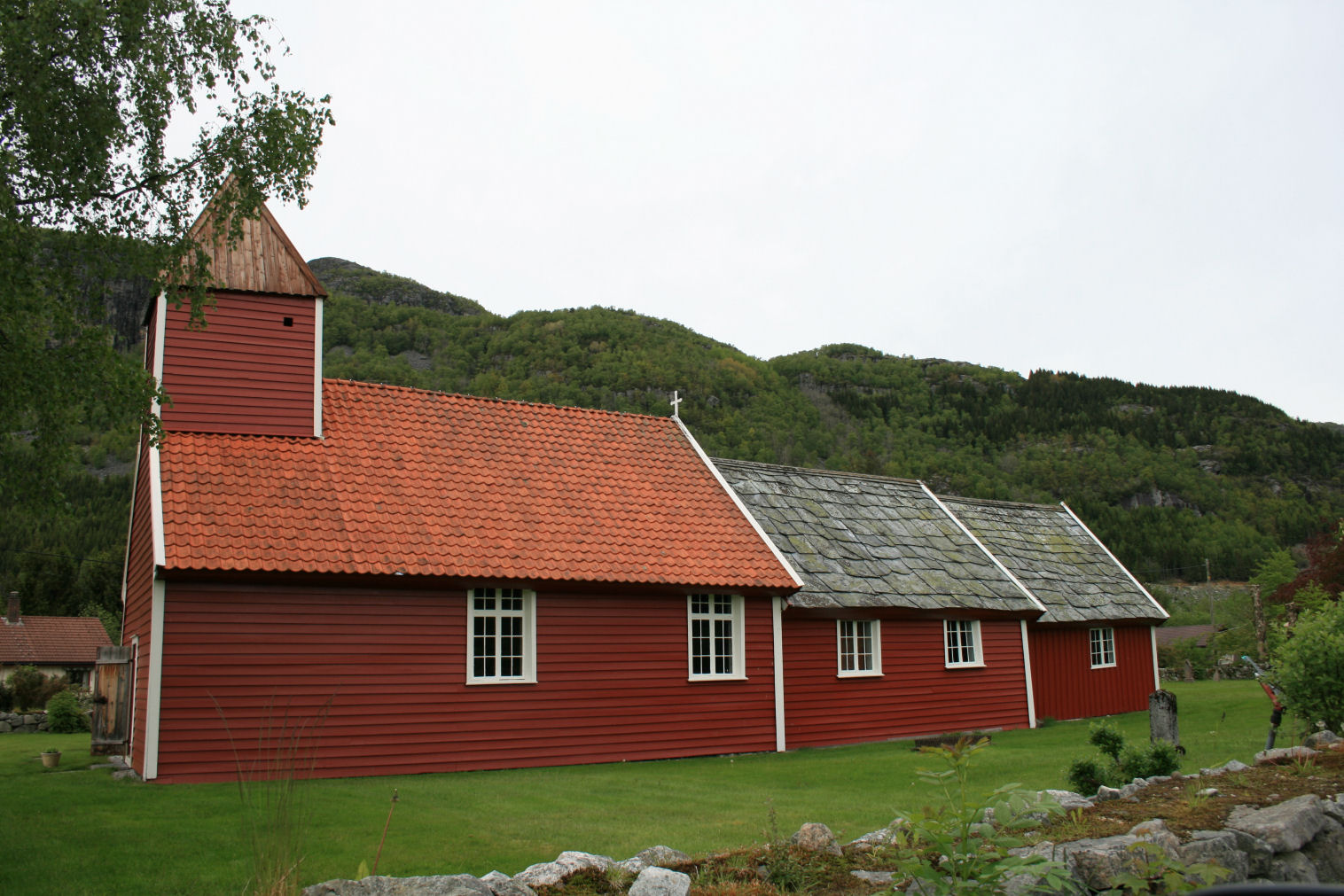
Exterior view

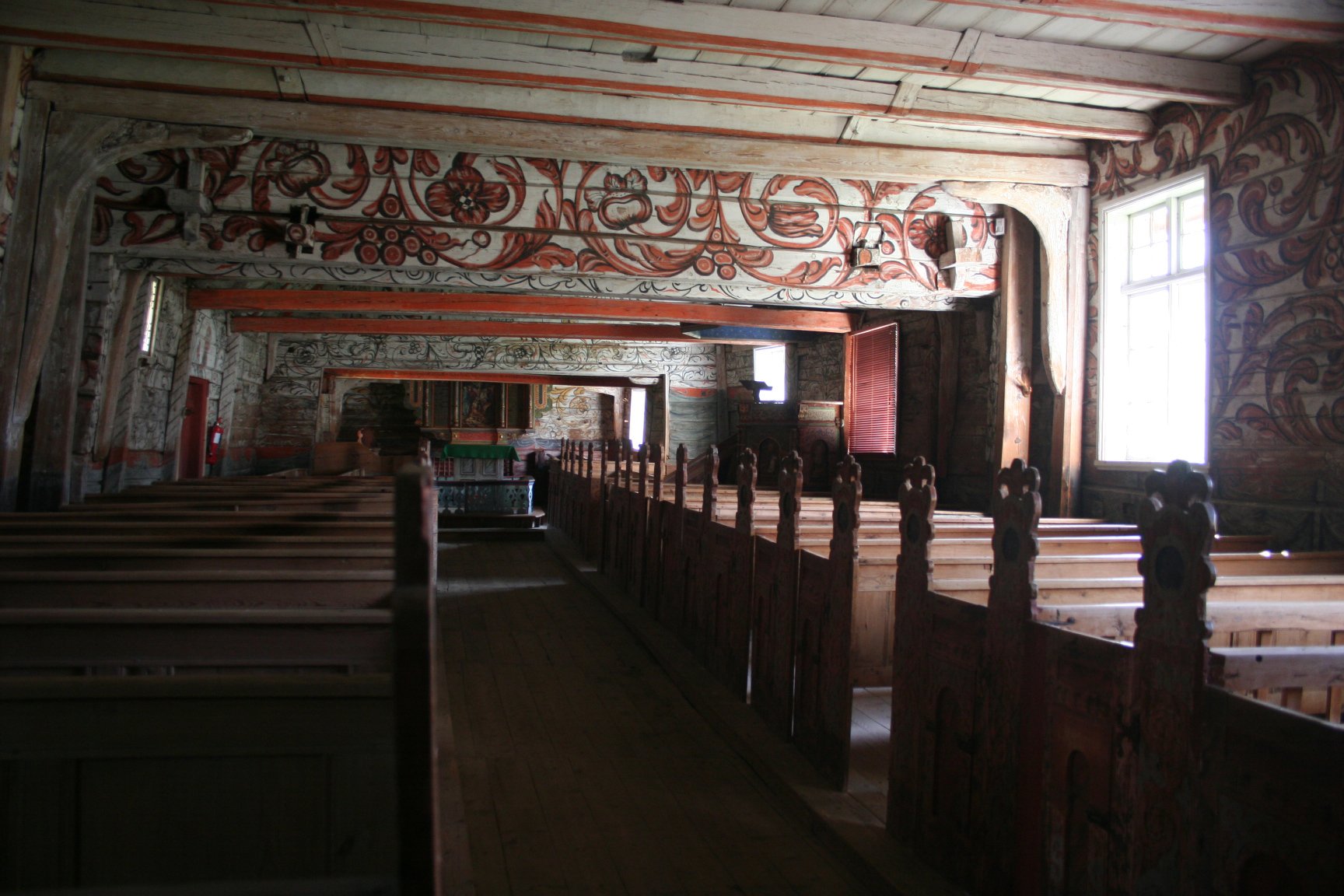
Interior view

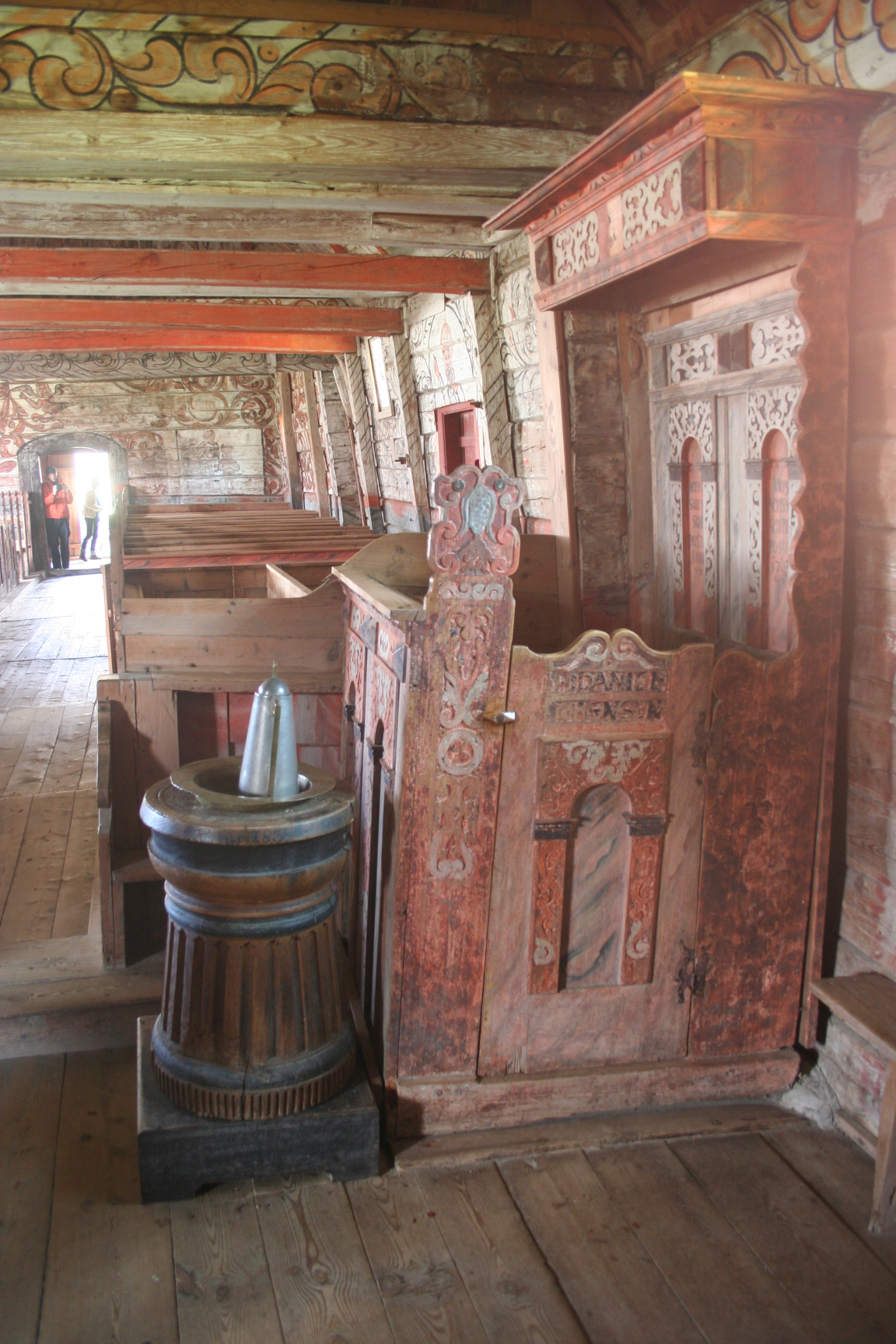
Baptismal font

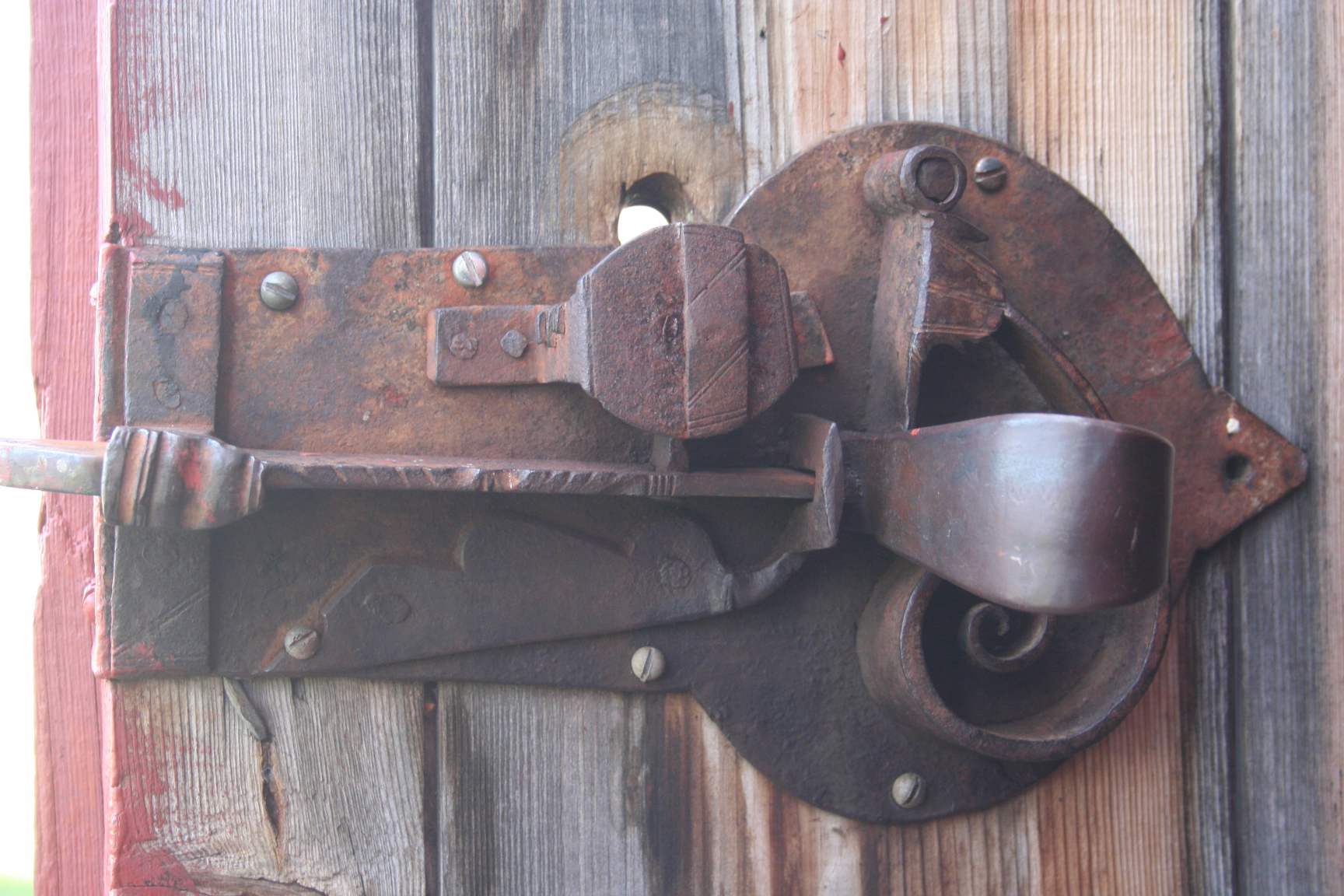
Door lock

== See also ==
- List of churches in Rogaland
