= Hjelmeland Church =

Church in Rogaland, Norway

- Hjelmeland kyrkje
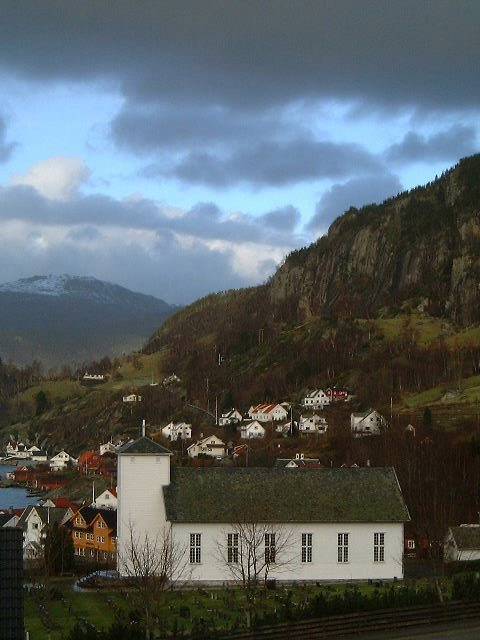
- View of the church
- Hjelmeland Church
- 59.23586°N 6.18066°E
- Location: Hjelmeland Municipality, Rogaland
- Country: Norway
- Denomination: Church of Norway
- Churchmanship: Evangelical Lutheran

History
- Former name: Sæbø kirke
- Status: Parish church
- Founded: 12th century
- Consecrated: 1858

Architecture
- Functional status: Active
- Architect: Hans Linstow
- Architectural type: Long church
- Completed: 1858 (168 years ago)

Specifications
- Capacity: 500
- Materials: Wood

Administration
- Diocese: Stavanger bispedømme
- Deanery: Ryfylke prosti
- Parish: Hjelmeland
- Norwegian Cultural Heritage Site
- Type: Church
- Status: Protected
- ID: 84583

Hjelmeland Church (Norwegian: Hjelmeland kirke) is a parish church of the Church of Norway in Hjelmeland Municipality in Rogaland county, Norway. It is located in the village of Hjelmelandsvågen. It is the church for the Hjelmeland parish which is part of the Ryfylke prosti (deanery) in the Diocese of Stavanger. The white, wooden church was built in a long church design in 1858 using designs by the architect Hans Linstow. The church seats about 500 people.

== History ==
The earliest existing historical records of the church date back to the year 1280, but the church was likely built during the 12th century. Originally, the stave church was located at Sæbø on an island in the estuary of a small river, about 125 metres (410 ft) northwest of the present site of the church in Hjelmeland.

The church was then known as Sæbø Church and the priest had a farm, just south of the river in Hjelmeland. Over time the names Sæbø and Hjelmeland were used interchangeably for the church and parish. In the years 1618–28, a number of construction works were carried out on the church, including the erection of a new tower. Also, a new and larger nave was added to the west.

In 1814, this church served as an election church (Norwegian: valgkirke). Together with more than 300 other parish churches across Norway, it was a polling station for elections to the 1814 Norwegian Constituent Assembly which wrote the Constitution of Norway. This was Norway's first national elections. Each church parish was a constituency that elected people called "electors" who later met together in each county to elect the representatives for the assembly that was to meet at Eidsvoll Manor later that year.

In 1858, a new church was built about 125 metres (410 ft) to the southeast across the river on the site of the priest's farm. The new church was known as Hjelmeland Church, after the name of the farm on which it was located. The old church was torn down soon afterwards.

== See also ==
- List of churches in Rogaland
