= Årdal Church (Rogaland) =

Church in Rogaland, Norway

- Årdal kyrkje
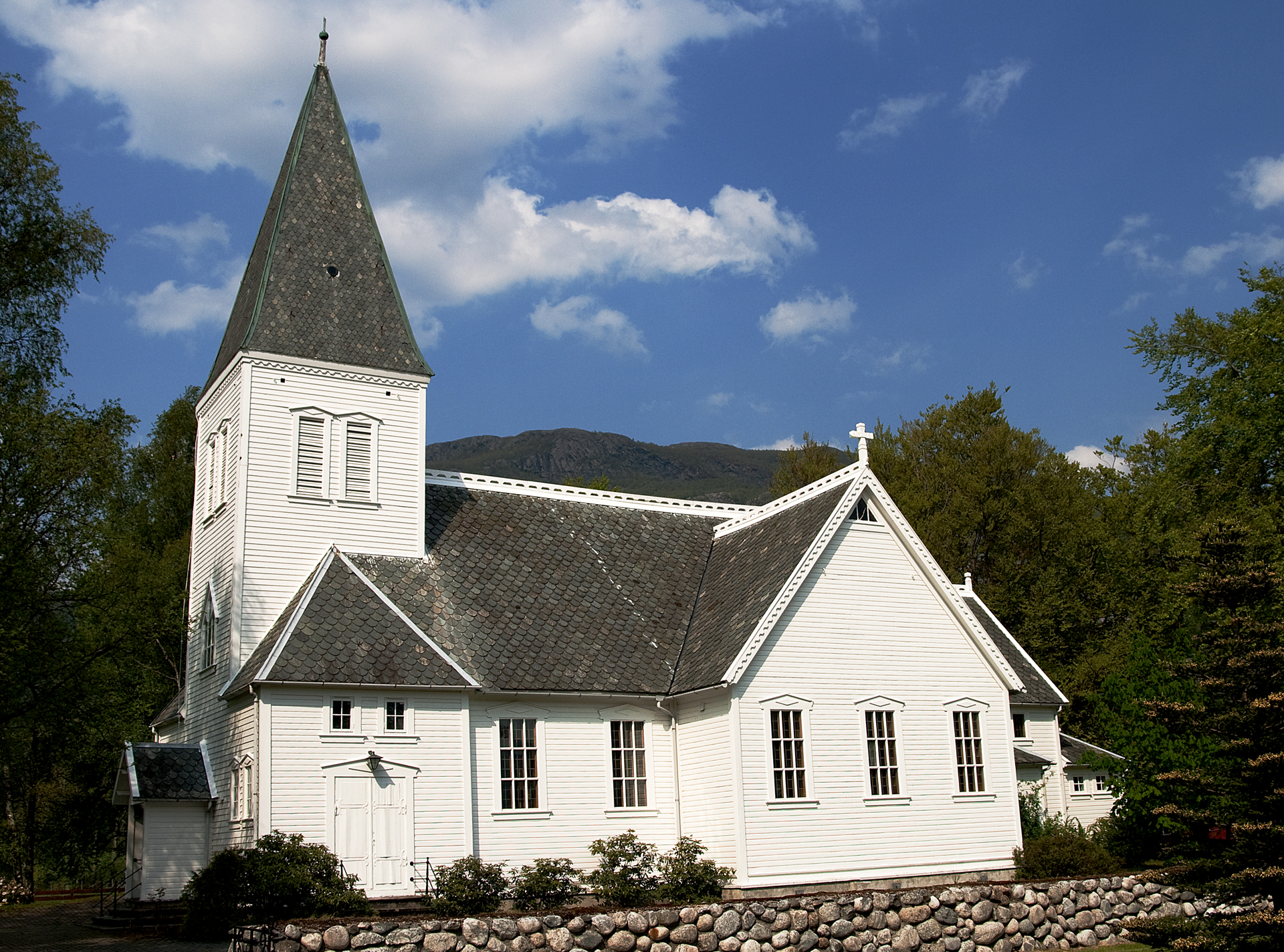
- View of the church
- Årdal Church
- 59.154558°N 6.19082°E
- Location: Hjelmeland Municipality, Rogaland
- Country: Norway
- Denomination: Church of Norway
- Churchmanship: Evangelical Lutheran

History
- Status: Parish church
- Founded: 1914
- Consecrated: 1919

Architecture
- Functional status: Active
- Architect: Einar Halleland
- Architectural type: Cruciform
- Groundbreaking: 1914
- Completed: 1916

Specifications
- Capacity: 250
- Materials: Wood

Administration
- Diocese: Stavanger bispedømme
- Deanery: Ryfylke prosti
- Parish: Årdal
- Norwegian Cultural Heritage Site
- Type: Church
- Status: Not protected
- ID: 85980

Årdal Church (Norwegian: Årdal kirke) is a parish church of the Church of Norway in Hjelmeland Municipality in Rogaland county, Norway. It is located in the village of Årdal. It is the church for the Årdal parish which is part of the Ryfylke prosti (deanery) in the Diocese of Stavanger. The white, wooden church was built in a cruciform design in 1914-1916 using designs by the architect Einar Halleland. The church seats about 250 people.

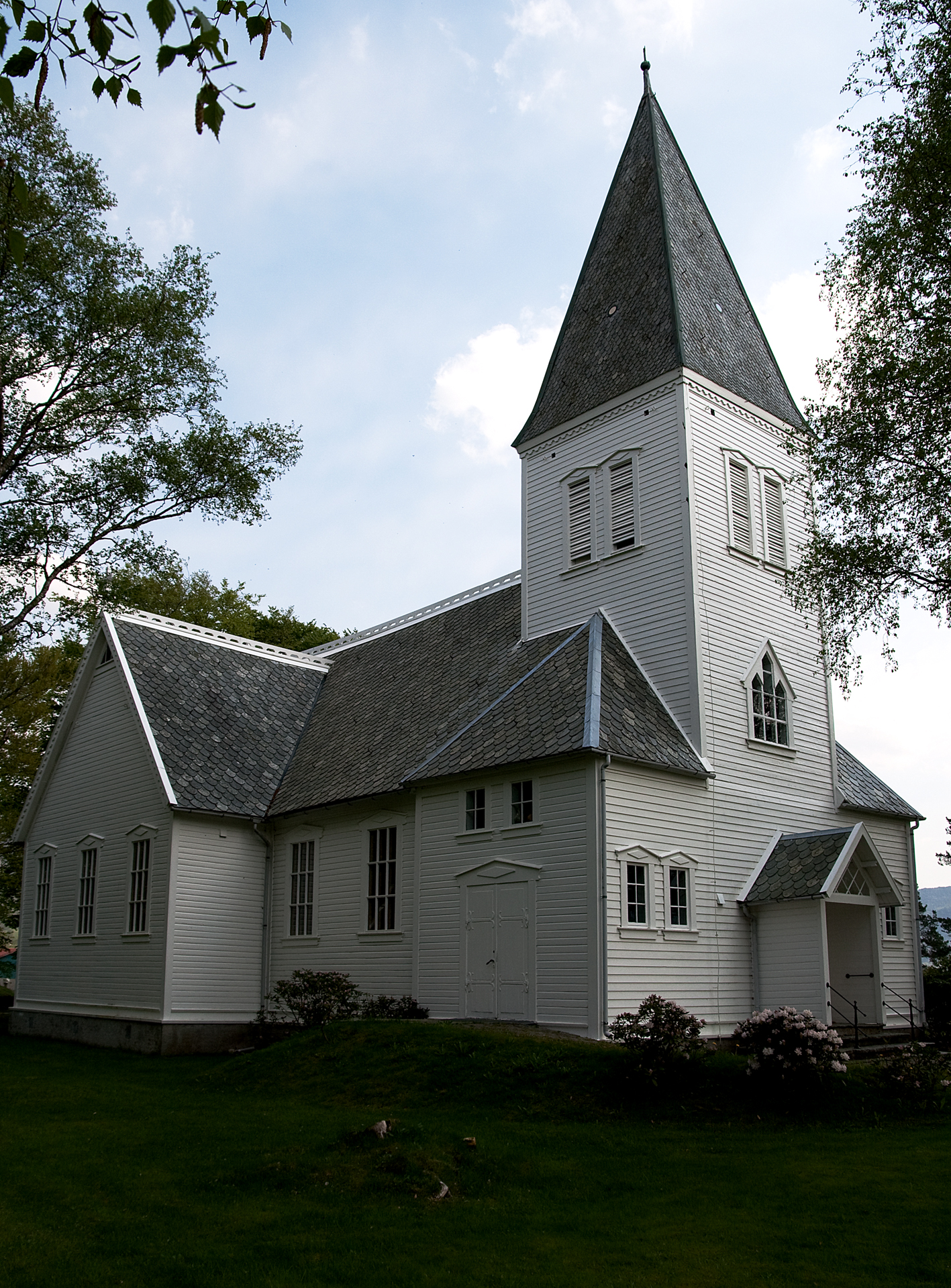
View of the church

The church was completed in 1916 to replace the Old Årdal Church which is located about 600 metres (2,000 ft) to the northeast. It was consecrated in 1919. Since it is the "new" church, it is also known as the New Årdal Church (Norwegian: Nye Årdal kirke).

== See also ==
- List of churches in Rogaland
