= Jøsenfjorden =

Fjord in Hjelmeland, Norway

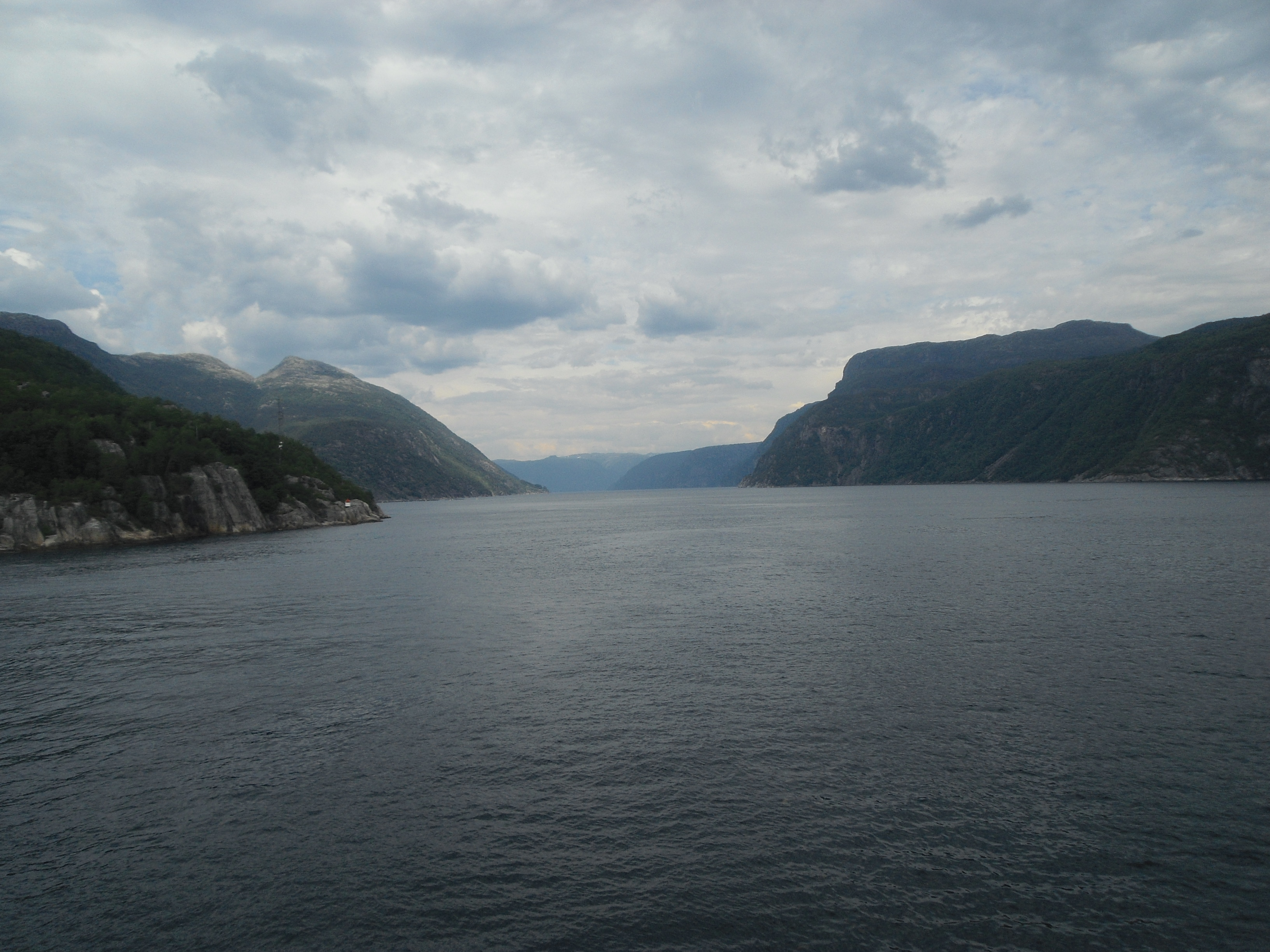
- View of the fjord
- Interactive map of the fjord
- Location: Rogaland county, Norway
- Coordinates: 59.28741°N 6.29679°E
- Type: Fjord
- Primary outflows: Boknafjorden
- Basin countries: Norway
- Max. length: 24 kilometres (15 mi)
- Max. width: 1 to 2 km (0.62 to 1.24 mi)
- Settlements: Jøsenfjorden

Jøsenfjorden is a fjord in Hjelmeland Municipality in Rogaland county, Norway. The fjord is a branch off of the main Boknafjorden. The fjord has a length of 24 kilometres (15 mi) and a width between 1 and 2 kilometres (0.62 and 1.24 mi). The Norwegian National Road 13 runs along the northern shore of the fjord.

The innermost part of the fjord is where the river Førreåa empties into the fjord at small Førrebotn farm. The river Ulla empties into the fjord along the northern shoreline at the village of Jøsenfjorden and the river Vorma empties into the fjord along the southern shoreline of the fjord at the small farming village of Tøtlandsvik. The municipal centre of Hjelmelandsvågen lies at the southern side of the mouth of the fjord. Both sides of the fjord are steep and they rise almost vertically to heights of over 700 metres (2,300 ft) above sea level.

The geology of the Jøsenfjorden was thoroughly investigated and described by Professor Bjørn G. Andersen in his Master's thesis (1954) ”Om isens tilbaketrekking i området mellom Lysefjorden og Jøsenfjorden i Ryfylke” (On the glacial retreat in the area between the Lysefjorden and Jøsenfjorden in Ryfylke).

== See also ==
- List of Norwegian fjords
