= Årdal, Hjelmeland =

Village in Hjelmeland Municipality, Norway

Årdal
- Village
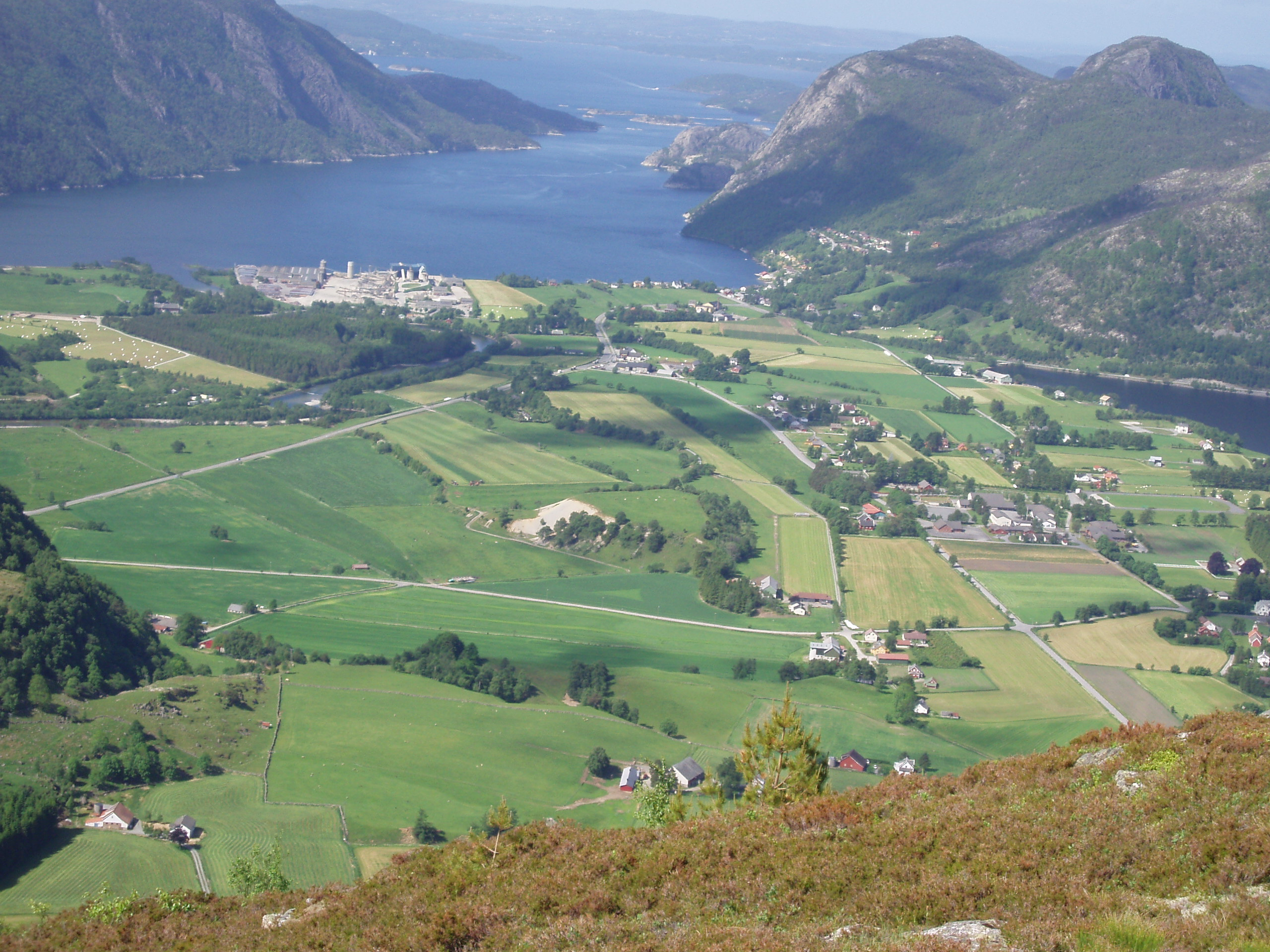
- View of the village
- Interactive map of Årdal
- Coordinates: 59.15°N 6.16667°E
- Country: Norway
- Region: Western Norway
- County: Rogaland
- District: Ryfylke
- Municipality: Hjelmeland Municipality
- Elevation: 4 m (13 ft)
- Time zone: UTC+01:00 (CET)
  - Summer (DST): UTC+02:00 (CEST)
- Post Code: 4137 Årdal i Ryfylke

Årdal is a village in Hjelmeland Municipality in Rogaland county, Norway. The village is located at the eastern end of the Årdalsfjorden at the mouth of the river Storåna. The village sits about 10 kilometres (6.2 mi) southeast of the village of Fister and about 12 kilometres (7.5 mi) south of the village of Hjelmeland.

Årdal's main industries are based on the mining of sand, crushed stone, and gravel. About one million tons of those items are shipped each year from the port of Årdal. The village is also home to the historic Old Årdal Church and the newer Årdal Church.

== History ==
From 1859 until 1965, Årdal was the administrative centre of the old Årdal Municipality.
