= Hjelmeland (village) =

Village in Hjelmeland Municipality, Norway

Hjelmeland Hjelmelandsvågen
- Village
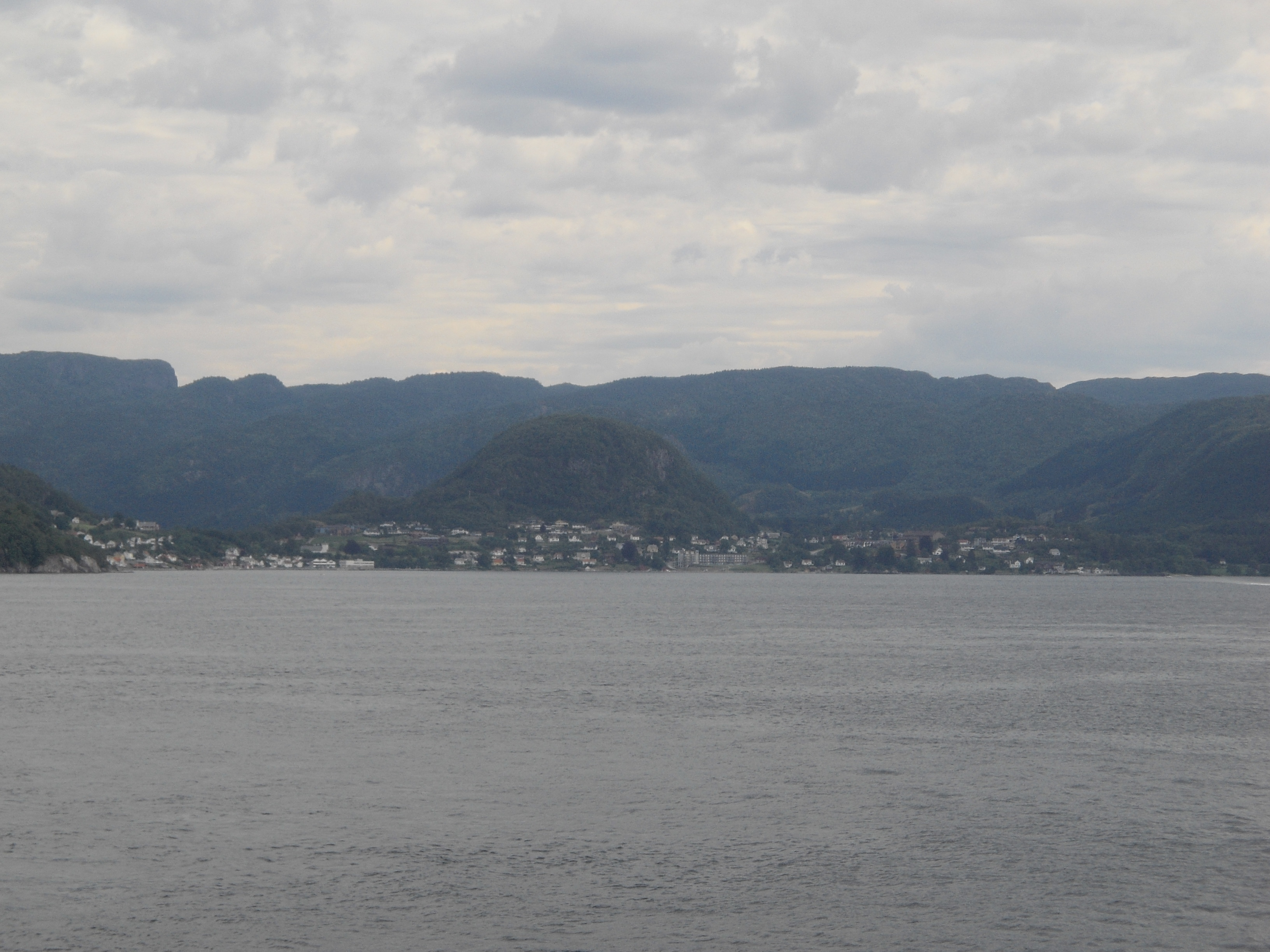
- View of the village
- Interactive map of Hjelmeland
- Coordinates: 59.23727°N 6.17931°E
- Country: Norway
- Region: Western Norway
- County: Rogaland
- District: Ryfylke
- Municipality: Hjelmeland Municipality

Area
  - Total: 0.73 km^{2} (0.28 sq mi)
- Elevation: 2 m (6.6 ft)

Population (2025)
  - Total: 639
  - Density: 875/km^{2} (2,270/sq mi)
- Time zone: UTC+01:00 (CET)
  - Summer (DST): UTC+02:00 (CEST)
- Post Code: 4130 Hjelmeland

Hjelmeland or Hjelmelandsvågen is the administrative centre of Hjelmeland Municipality in Rogaland county, Norway. The village is located on the south side of the mouth of the Jøsenfjorden.

The 0.73-square-kilometre (180-acre) village has a population (2025) of 639 and a population density of 875 inhabitants per square kilometre (2,270/sq mi).

The Norwegian National Road 13 runs through the village, with a ferry connection across the Jøsenfjorden and to the nearby island of Ombo. The village sits about 10 kilometres (6.2 mi) northeast of the village of Fister and about the same distance north of the village of Årdal. Hjelmeland Church is located in the village.
