= Sand Municipality =

Former municipality in Rogaland, Norway

Sand Municipality Sand herred
- Former municipality
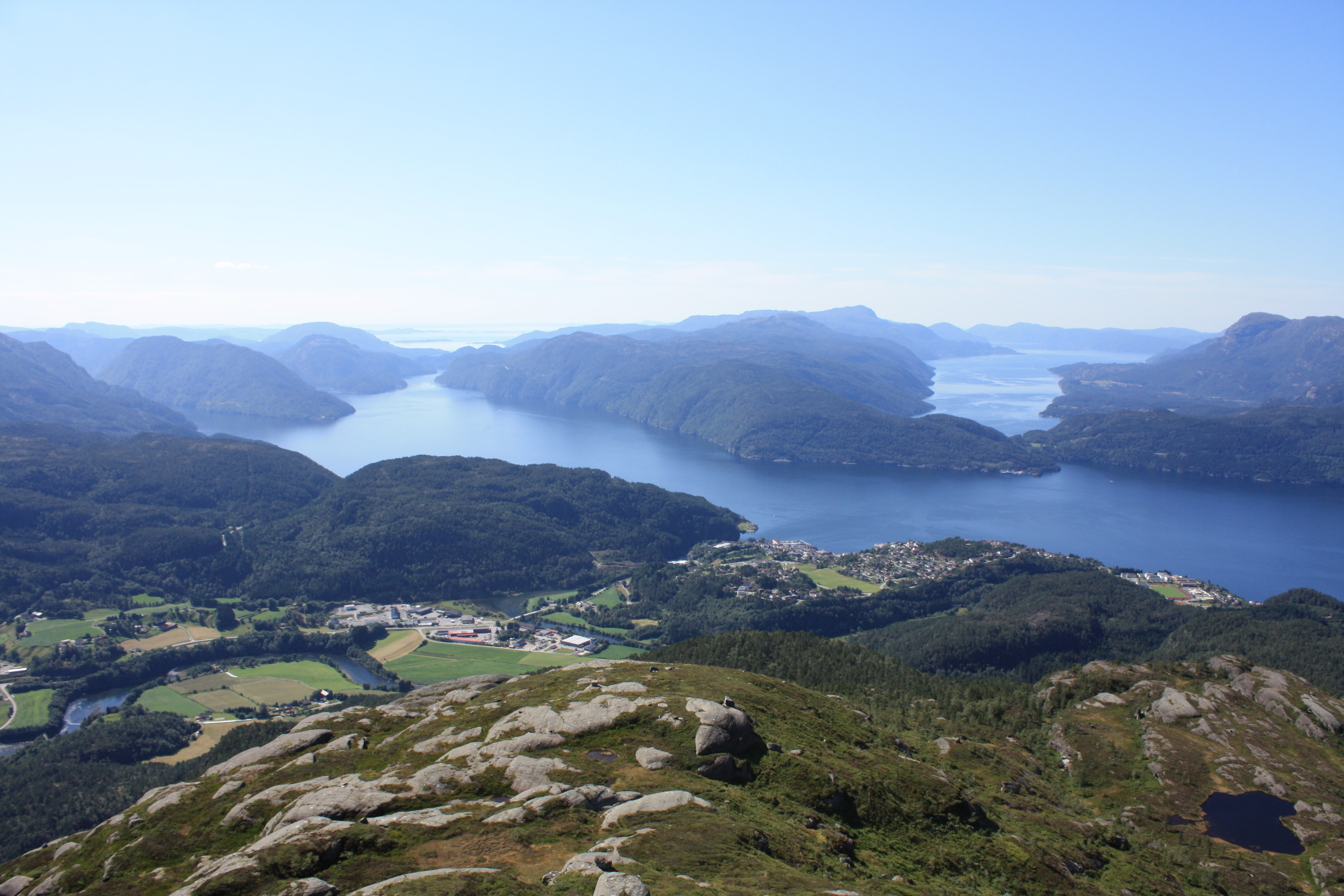
- View of the village and municipality of Sand

- Rogaland within Norway

- Sand within Rogaland
- Coordinates: 59°29′12″N 06°15′04″E
- Country: Norway
- County: Rogaland
- District: Ryfylke
- Established: 1 Jan 1859
  - Preceded by: Jelsa Municipality
- Disestablished: 1 Jan 1965
  - Succeeded by: Suldal Municipality
- Administrative centre: Sand

Government
  - Mayor (1963–1964): Torger Hauge (Ap)

Area (upon dissolution)
  - Total: 213.8 km^{2} (82.5 sq mi)
  - Rank: #329 in Norway
- Highest elevation: 1,371 m (4,498 ft)

Population (1964)
  - Total: 1,167
  - Rank: #476 in Norway
  - Density: 5.5/km^{2} (14/sq mi)
  - Change (10 years): ▼ −0.8%
- Demonym: Sandsbu

Official language
  - Norwegian form: Neutral
- Time zone: UTC+01:00 (CET)
  - Summer (DST): UTC+02:00 (CEST)
- ISO 3166 code: NO-1136

Sand is a former municipality in Rogaland county, Norway. The 213.8-square-kilometre (82.5 sq mi) municipality existed from 1859 until its dissolution in 1965. The area is now part of Suldal Municipality in the traditional district of Ryfylke. The administrative centre was the village of Sand, where Sand Church is located.

Prior to its dissolution in 1965, the 213.8-square-kilometre (82.5 sq mi) municipality was the 329th largest by area out of the 525 municipalities in Norway. Sand Municipality was the 476th most populous municipality in Norway with a population of about 1,167. The municipality's population density was 5.5 inhabitants per square kilometre (14/sq mi) and its population had decreased by 0.8% over the previous 10-year period.

== General information ==
The municipality was created in 1859 when the large Jelsa Municipality was divided in two: the northern district (population: 1,600) became the new Sand Municipality and the southern district (population: 2,606) remained as a smaller Jelsa Municipality.

During the 1960s, there were many municipal mergers across Norway due to the work of the Schei Committee. On 1 January 1965, Sand Municipality was dissolved. The following areas were merged to form a new, larger Suldal Municipality:

- all of Suldal Municipality (population: 1,412)
- all of Sand Municipality (population: 1,135)
- all of Erfjord Municipality (population: 610)
- most of Jelsa Municipality (population: 928), except for the areas of Jelsa located on the island of Ombo which became part of Finnøy Municipality and Hjelmeland Municipality
- the part of Imsland Municipality that was located south of the Vindafjorden (population: 61)

=== Name ===
The municipality (originally the parish) is named after the old Sand farm (Old Norse: Sandr) since the first Sand Church was built there. The name is identical to the word sandr which means "sand".

=== Churches ===
The Church of Norway had one parish (sokn) within Sand Municipality. At the time of the municipal dissolution, it was part of the Sand prestegjeld and the Ryfylke prosti (deanery) in the Diocese of Stavanger.

Churches in Sand Municipality
Parish (sokn)	Church name	Location of the church	Year built
Sand	Sand Church	Sand	1853

== Geography ==
The municipality was located along the Sandsfjorden and Hylsfjorden. The highest point in the municipality was the 1,371-metre (4,498 ft) tall mountain Dyrskardsnuten, a tripoint on the border with Sauda Municipality, Suldal Municipality, and Sand Municipality. Sauda Municipality was located to the north, Suldal Municipality was located to the east, Erfjord Municipality was located to the south, Jelsa Municipality was located to the southwest, Imsland Municipality was located to the west, and Vikedal Municipality was located to the northwest.

== Government ==
While it existed, Sand Municipality was responsible for primary education (through 10th grade), outpatient health services, senior citizen services, welfare and other social services, zoning, economic development, and municipal roads and utilities. The municipality was governed by a municipal council of directly elected representatives. The mayor was indirectly elected by a vote of the municipal council. The municipality was under the jurisdiction of the Ryfylke District Court and the Gulating Court of Appeal.

=== Municipal council ===
The municipal council (Herredsstyre) of Sand Municipality was made up of 13 representatives that were elected to four year terms. The tables below show the historical composition of the council by political party.

Sand herredsstyre 1963–1965
Party name (in Norwegian)	Number of representatives
Labour Party (Arbeiderpartiet)	4
Local List(s) (Lokale lister)	9
Total number of members:	13
Note: On 1 January 1965, Sand Municipality became part of Suldal Municipality.

Sand herredsstyre 1959–1963
Party name (in Norwegian)	Number of representatives
Labour Party (Arbeiderpartiet)	4
Joint List(s) of Non-Socialist Parties (Borgerlige Felleslister)	1
Local List(s) (Lokale lister)	8
Total number of members:	13

Sand herredsstyre 1955–1959
Party name (in Norwegian)	Number of representatives
Labour Party (Arbeiderpartiet)	4
Local List(s) (Lokale lister)	9
Total number of members:	13

Sand herredsstyre 1951–1955
Party name (in Norwegian)	Number of representatives
Labour Party (Arbeiderpartiet)	4
Local List(s) (Lokale lister)	8
Total number of members:	12

Sand herredsstyre 1947–1951
Party name (in Norwegian)	Number of representatives
Labour Party (Arbeiderpartiet)	3
Local List(s) (Lokale lister)	9
Total number of members:	12

Sand herredsstyre 1945–1947
Party name (in Norwegian)	Number of representatives
Labour Party (Arbeiderpartiet)	4
Local List(s) (Lokale lister)	8
Total number of members:	12

Sand herredsstyre 1937–1941*
Party name (in Norwegian)	Number of representatives
Labour Party (Arbeiderpartiet)	2
Farmers' Party (Bondepartiet)	2
Local List(s) (Lokale lister)	8
Total number of members:	12
Note: Due to the German occupation of Norway during World War II, no elections were held for new municipal councils until after the war ended in 1945.

=== Mayors ===
The mayor (Norwegian: ordfører) of Sand Municipality was the political leader of the municipality and the chairperson of the municipal council. The following people have held this position:

- 1859–1861: Osmund Bjerge
- 1862–1863: Rev. Ulrik Wilhelm Koren Tornøe
- 1864–1864: Paul Tengesdal
- 1865–1866: Rev. Ulrik Wilhelm Koren Tornøe
- 1867–1873: Osmund Bjerge
- 1874–1874: Paul Tengesdal
- 1875–1877: Helmert Hylen
- 1878–1879: Osmund Bjerge
- 1880–1884: Lars E. Vandvig
- 1885–1885: Ole O. Berge
- 1886–1893: Lars E. Vandvig
- 1894–1897: Lars Rasmussen
- 1898–1901: Lars Johnsen
- 1902–1904: Lars Rasmussen
- 1905–1907: Anders Klungtvedt
- 1908–1910: Asseus Steinnes
- 1911–1913: Torger Hauge
- 1914–1915: Lars Rasmussen
- 1917–1919: Aasmund Berge
- 1919–1922: Andreas Fanæs
- 1922–1925: Aasmund Berge
- 1925–1928: Olaus Hiim
- 1928–1931: Aasmund Berge
- 1931–1934: Rasmus Rasmussen
- 1934–1941: Bertrand Vandvik
- 1942–1945: Johannes Fatland
- 1946–1955: Olav Kolbeinstveit (LL)
- 1955–1963: Olav Vandvik (LL)
- 1963–1964: Torger Hauge (Ap)

== See also ==
- List of former municipalities of Norway
