= Vikedal (disambiguation) =

Vikedal, alternately spelled Vikadal, may refer to:

== Places ==
- Vikedal, a village in Vindafjord municipality, Rogaland county, Norway
- Vikedal Municipality, a former municipality in Rogaland county, Norway
- Vikedal Church, a church in Vindafjord municipality, Rogaland county, Norway
- Vikadal, Vestland (also spelled Vikedal), a village in Kvam municipality, Vestland county, Norway

== People ==
- Ryan Vikedal, a former member of the band Nickelback
