= Jelsa Municipality =

Former municipality in Rogaland, Norway

Jelsa Municipality Jelsa herred
- Former municipality
- Jælse herred (historic name)
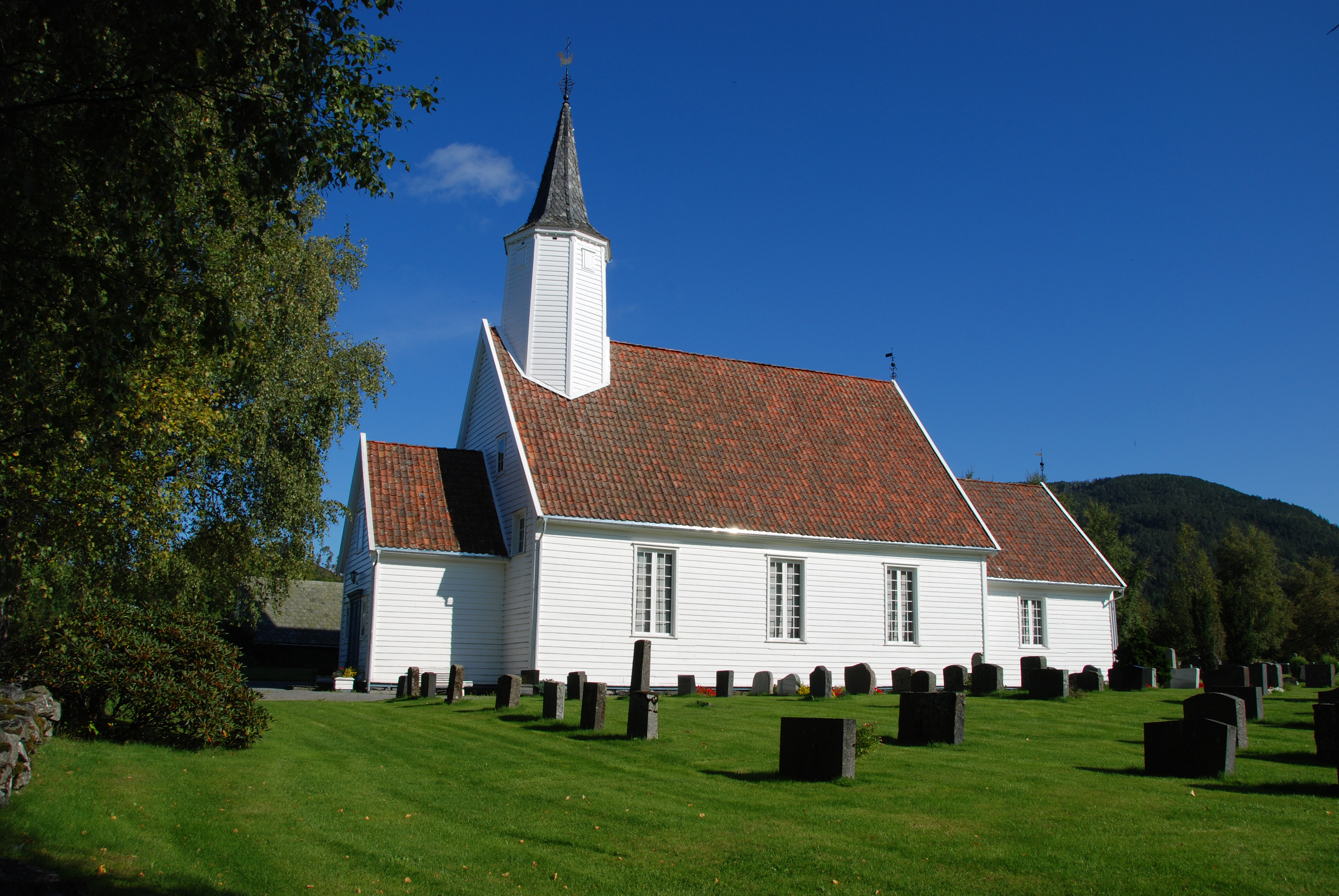
- View of Jelsa Church, the main church for the municipality

- Rogaland within Norway

- Jelsa within Rogaland
- Coordinates: 59°20′N 06°04′E
- Country: Norway
- County: Rogaland
- District: Ryfylke
- Established: 1 Jan 1838
  - Created as: Formannskapsdistrikt
- Disestablished: 1 Jan 1965
  - Succeeded by: Suldal, Hjelmeland, and Finnøy municipalities
- Administrative centre: Jelsa

Government
  - Mayor (1963–1964): Lars Bjørnsen Jelsa

Area (upon dissolution)
  - Total: 129.8 km^{2} (50.1 sq mi)
  - Rank: #392 in Norway
- Highest elevation: 862 m (2,828 ft)

Population (1964)
  - Total: 1,028
  - Rank: #482 in Norway
  - Density: 7.9/km^{2} (20/sq mi)
  - Change (10 years): ▼ −21.7%

Official language
  - Norwegian form: Neutral
- Time zone: UTC+01:00 (CET)
  - Summer (DST): UTC+02:00 (CEST)
- ISO 3166 code: NO-1138

Jelsa is a former municipality in Rogaland county, Norway. The 129.8-square-kilometre (50.1 sq mi) municipality existed from 1838 until its dissolution in 1965. The area is now divided between Hjelmeland Municipality, Stavanger Municipality, and Suldal Municipality in the traditional district of Ryfylke. The administrative centre was the village of Jelsa, where Jelsa Church is located.

Prior to its dissolution in 1965, the 129.8-square-kilometre (50.1 sq mi) municipality was the 392nd largest by area out of the 525 municipalities in Norway. Jelsa Municipality was the 482nd most populous municipality in Norway with a population of about 1,028. The municipality's population density was 7.9 inhabitants per square kilometre (20/sq mi) and its population had decreased by 21.7% over the previous 10-year period.

== General information ==
The parish of Jælse (later spelled Jelsa) was established as a municipality on 1 January 1838 (see formannskapsdistrikt law). In 1859, the municipality was divided in two: the northern district (population: 1,600) became the new Sand Municipality and the southern district (population: 2,606) remained as a smaller Jelsa Municipality.

On 1 January 1914, Jelsa Municipality was divided again: the eastern district (population: 617) became the new Erfjord Municipality and the western district (population: 1,539) remained as a smaller Jelsa Municipality.

During the 1960s, there were many municipal mergers across Norway due to the work of the Schei Committee. On 1 January 1965, Jelsa Municipality was dissolved. The Buergårdene area (population: 8) located on the island of Ombo was moved from Jelsa Municipality to Hjelmeland Municipality, and the rest of Jelsa Municipality located on the island of Ombo (population: 89) was transferred to Finnøy Municipality. On the same date, the rest of Jelsa Municipality was merged with the following areas were merged to form a new, larger Suldal Municipality:

- all of Suldal Municipality (population: 1,412)
- all of Sand Municipality (population: 1,135)
- all of Erfjord Municipality (population: 610)
- the parts of Jelsa Municipality not located on the island of Ombo (population: 928)
- the part of Imsland Municipality that was located south of the Vindafjorden (population: 61)

=== Name ===
The municipality (originally the parish) is named after the old Jelsa farm (Old Norse: Jalsa) since the first Jelsa Church was built there. The meaning of the name is uncertain, but it is probably the old name for the Jelsafjorden. It is possible that the name comes from the word jálmr which means "noise". Another possibility is that it comes from the Shetland word jāl which means "scream" or "screech" (particularly referring to the noise a seagull makes). Historically, the name was spelled Jælse.

=== Churches ===
The Church of Norway had one parish (sokn) within Jelsa Municipality. At the time of the municipal dissolution, it was part of the Jelsa prestegjeld and the Ryfylke prosti (deanery) in the Diocese of Stavanger.

Churches in Jelsa Municipality
Parish (sokn)	Church name	Location of the church	Year built
Jelsa	Jelsa Church	Jelsa	1647
Jelsa	Marvik Chapel	Marvik	1920

== Geography ==
The municipality was located along the Sandsfjorden including land on the Ropeid peninsula and on the mainland. The highest point in the municipality was the 862-metre (2,828 ft) tall mountain Grytenuten, a tripoint on the border of Imsland Municipality, Vikedal Municipality, and Jelsa Municipality. Imsland Municipality was located to the north, Sand Municipality was located to the northeast, Erfjord Municipality was located to the southeast, Hjelmeland Municipality was located to the south, Sjernarøy Municipality was located to the southwest, Nedstrand Municipality was located to the west, and Vikedal Municipality was located to the northwest.

== Government ==
While it existed, Jelsa Municipality was responsible for primary education (through 10th grade), outpatient health services, senior citizen services, welfare and other social services, zoning, economic development, and municipal roads and utilities. The municipality was governed by a municipal council of directly elected representatives. The mayor was indirectly elected by a vote of the municipal council. The municipality was under the jurisdiction of the Ryfylke District Court and the Gulating Court of Appeal.

=== Municipal council ===
The municipal council (Herredsstyre) of Jelsa Municipality was made up of 17 representatives that were elected to four year terms. The tables below show the historical composition of the council by political party.

Jelsa herredsstyre 1963–1965
Party name (in Norwegian)	Number of representatives
Labour Party (Arbeiderpartiet)	3
Christian Democratic Party (Kristelig Folkeparti)	6
Centre Party (Senterpartiet)	8
Total number of members:	17
Note: On 1 January 1965, Jelsa Municipality was divided between Finnøy Municipality, Hjelmeland Municipality, and Suldal Municipality.

Jelsa herredsstyre 1959–1963
Party name (in Norwegian)	Number of representatives
Labour Party (Arbeiderpartiet)	4
Joint List(s) of Non-Socialist Parties (Borgerlige Felleslister)	9
Local List(s) (Lokale lister)	4
Total number of members:	17

Jelsa herredsstyre 1955–1959
Party name (in Norwegian)	Number of representatives
Local List(s) (Lokale lister)	17
Total number of members:	17

Jelsa herredsstyre 1951–1955
Party name (in Norwegian)	Number of representatives
Local List(s) (Lokale lister)	16
Total number of members:	16

Jelsa herredsstyre 1947–1951
Party name (in Norwegian)	Number of representatives
Local List(s) (Lokale lister)	16
Total number of members:	16

Jelsa herredsstyre 1945–1947
Party name (in Norwegian)	Number of representatives
Local List(s) (Lokale lister)	16
Total number of members:	16

Jelsa herredsstyre 1937–1941*
Party name (in Norwegian)	Number of representatives
Local List(s) (Lokale lister)	16
Total number of members:	16
Note: Due to the German occupation of Norway during World War II, no elections were held for new municipal councils until after the war ended in 1945.

=== Mayors ===
The mayor (Norwegian: ordfører) of Jelsa Municipality was the political leader of the municipality and the chairperson of the municipal council. The following people have held this position:

- 1838–1839: Ole Stephensen Fatnæs
- 1840–1840: Rev. Edvard Vilhelm Vedøe
- 1841–1845: Ole Stephensen Fatnæs
- 1846–1847: Johannes Bergesen Naadland
- 1848–1855: Ole Stephensen Fatnæs
- 1856–1859: Bjørn Larsen Jelsø
- 1860–1863: Ole Larsen Jelsø
- 1864–1865: Rasmus Gudmundsen Østhusbygden
- 1866–1869: Svend Thorsen Jelsa
- 1869–1869: Lars Haldorsen Jaarvig
- 1870–1875: Rasmus Gudmundsen Østhusbygden
- 1876–1877: Rev. Johan Fredrik Monrad
- 1878–1885: Edvard Thorsen
- 1886–1891: Lars Konrad Bjørnsen Jelsa
- 1892–1897: Edvard Thorsen
- 1898–1904: Christoffer P. Thorsen
- 1905–1910: Jon Foldøen
- 1911–1913: Thore E. Thorsen
- 1914–1920: Jon Foldøen
- 1920–1925: Lars Konrad Bjørnsen Jelsa
- 1926–1926: Ola Mehus
- 1927–1928: Albert Tveita
- 1929–1934: Christoffer Berg-Christensen
- 1935–1937: Sigurd Lindal
- 1938–1941: Christoffer Berg-Christensen
- 1942–1945: Arnt Knutsen
- 1945–1947: Olav Østerhus
- 1947–1951: Arne Selsvik
- 1951–1955: Jakob Bjørklund
- 1955–1959: Einar Thorsen
- 1959–1963: Leiv Oppedal
- 1963–1964: Lars Bjørnsen Jelsa

== See also ==
- List of former municipalities of Norway
