= Imsland Municipality =

Former municipality in Rogaland, Norway

Imsland Municipality Imsland herred
- Former municipality
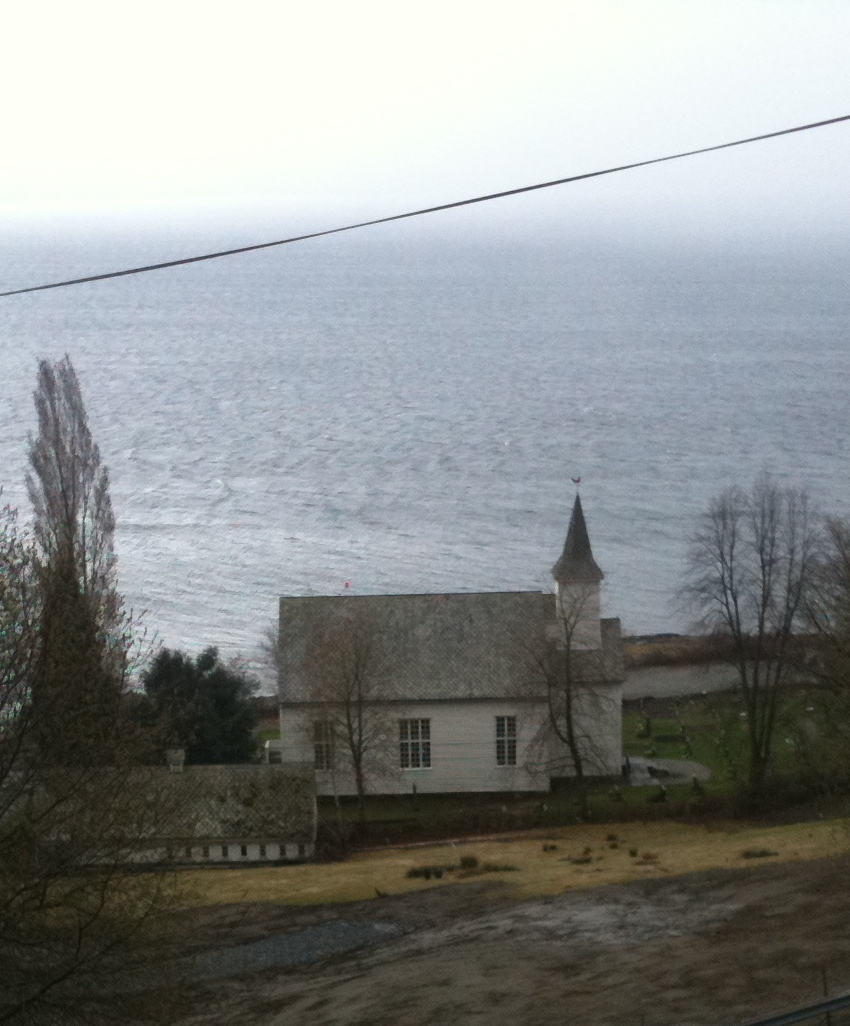
- View of the local church

- Rogaland within Norway

- Imsland within Rogaland
- Coordinates: 59°28′44″N 05°59′25″E
- Country: Norway
- County: Rogaland
- District: Ryfylke
- Established: 1 Jan 1923
  - Preceded by: Vikedal Municipality
- Disestablished: 1 Jan 1965
  - Succeeded by: Vindafjord Municipality and Suldal Municipality
- Administrative centre: Imslandsjøen

Government
  - Mayor (1955–1964): Jone Hustveit

Area (upon dissolution)
  - Total: 90.9 km^{2} (35.1 sq mi)
  - Rank: #427 in Norway
- Highest elevation: 954 m (3,130 ft)

Population (1964)
  - Total: 445
  - Rank: #520 in Norway
  - Density: 4.9/km^{2} (13/sq mi)
  - Change (10 years): ▼ −20.4%

Official language
  - Norwegian form: Neutral
- Time zone: UTC+01:00 (CET)
  - Summer (DST): UTC+02:00 (CEST)
- ISO 3166 code: NO-1156

Imsland is a former municipality in Rogaland county, Norway. The 90.9-square-kilometre (35.1 sq mi) municipality existed from 1923 until its dissolution in 1965. The area is now divided between Suldal Municipality and Vindafjord Municipality in the traditional district of Haugaland. The administrative centre was the village of Imslandsjøen.

Prior to its dissolution in 1965, the 90.9-square-kilometre (35.1 sq mi) municipality was the 427th largest by area out of the 525 municipalities in Norway. Imsland Municipality was the 520th most populous municipality in Norway with a population of about 445. The municipality's population density was 4.9 inhabitants per square kilometre (13/sq mi) and its population had decreased by 20.4% over the previous 10-year period.

== General information ==
The municipality was established on 1 January 1923 when the large Vikedal Municipality was divided into three:

- the southeastern part (population: 604) became the new Imsland Municipality
- the northern part (population: 558) became the new Sandeid Municipality
- the central part (population: 924) remained as a smaller Vikedal Municipality

Imsland Municipality existed for 42 years before it was dissolved in a merger brought upon by the recommendations of the Schei Committee. On 1 January 1965, Imsland Municipality was dissolved and its lands were split up as follows:

- the part of Imsland Municipality located south of the Vindafjorden (population: 61) was merged with Suldal Municipality, Sand Municipality, Erfjord Municipality plus parts of Jelsa Municipality to form a larger Suldal Municipality
- the rest of Imsland Municipality (population: 372) was merged with Sandeid Municipality and parts of Vikedal Municipality, Vats Municipality, and Skjold Municipality to form the new Vindafjord Municipality

=== Name ===
The municipality (originally the parish) is named after the old Imsland farm (Old Norse: Ylmisland) since the first Imsland Church was built there. The first element is the old name for a local river that used to be called Ylma. It is likely that the river name comes from the genitive case of the word olmr which means "fierce" or "angry". The last element is land which means "land" or "district".

=== Churches ===
The Church of Norway had one parish (sokn) within Imsland Municipality. At the time of the municipal dissolution, it was part of the Vikedal prestegjeld and the Ryfylke prosti (deanery) in the Diocese of Stavanger.

Churches in Imsland Municipality
Parish (sokn)	Church name	Location of the church	Year built
Imsland	Imsland Church	Imslandsjøen	1861

== Geography ==
The municipality included the area surrounding the inner part of the Vindafjorden. The highest point in the municipality was the 954-metre (3,130 ft) tall mountain Kaldanuten. Vikedal Municipality was located to the west and north, Sand Municipality was located to the east, and Jelsa Municipality was located to the south.

== Government ==
While it existed, Imsland Municipality was responsible for primary education (through 10th grade), outpatient health services, senior citizen services, welfare and other social services, zoning, economic development, and municipal roads and utilities. The municipality was governed by a municipal council of directly elected representatives. The mayor was indirectly elected by a vote of the municipal council. The municipality was under the jurisdiction of the Ryfylke District Court and the Gulating Court of Appeal.

=== Municipal council ===
The municipal council (Herredsstyre) of Imsland Municipality was made up of 13 representatives that were elected to four year terms. The tables below show the historical composition of the council by political party.

Imsland herredsstyre 1963–1964
Party name (in Norwegian)	Number of representatives
Local List(s) (Lokale lister)	13
Total number of members:	13
Note: On 1 January 1965, Imsland Municipality was divided between Suldal Municipality and Vindafjord Municipality.

Imsland herredsstyre 1959–1963
Party name (in Norwegian)	Number of representatives
Local List(s) (Lokale lister)	13
Total number of members:	13

Imsland herredsstyre 1955–1959
Party name (in Norwegian)	Number of representatives
Local List(s) (Lokale lister)	13
Total number of members:	13

Imsland herredsstyre 1951–1955
Party name (in Norwegian)	Number of representatives
Local List(s) (Lokale lister)	12
Total number of members:	12

Imsland herredsstyre 1947–1951
Party name (in Norwegian)	Number of representatives
Local List(s) (Lokale lister)	12
Total number of members:	12

Imsland herredsstyre 1945–1947
Party name (in Norwegian)	Number of representatives
Local List(s) (Lokale lister)	12
Total number of members:	12

Imsland herredsstyre 1937–1941*
Party name (in Norwegian)	Number of representatives
Local List(s) (Lokale lister)	12
Total number of members:	12
Note: Due to the German occupation of Norway during World War II, no elections were held for new municipal councils until after the war ended in 1945.

=== Mayors ===
The mayor (Norwegian: ordfører) of Imsland Municipality was the political leader of the municipality and the chairperson of the municipal council. The following people have held this position:

- 1923–1925: Bjørn Nybru
- 1926–1928: Torbjørn Moe
- 1929–1931: Bjørn Nybru
- 1931–1935: Bernhard Skipevåg
- 1935–1937: Ivar Finnvik
- 1938–1943: Bernhard Skipevåg
- 1943–1944: Inge Sigvald Sand (NS)
- 1944–1945: Lars M. Skibevåg
- 1945–1951: Jone Hustveit
- 1951–1955: Bernhard Skipevåg
- 1955–1964: Jone Hustveit

== See also ==
- List of former municipalities of Norway
