= Vikedal Municipality =

Former municipality in Rogaland, Norway

Vikedal Municipality Vikedal herred
- Former municipality
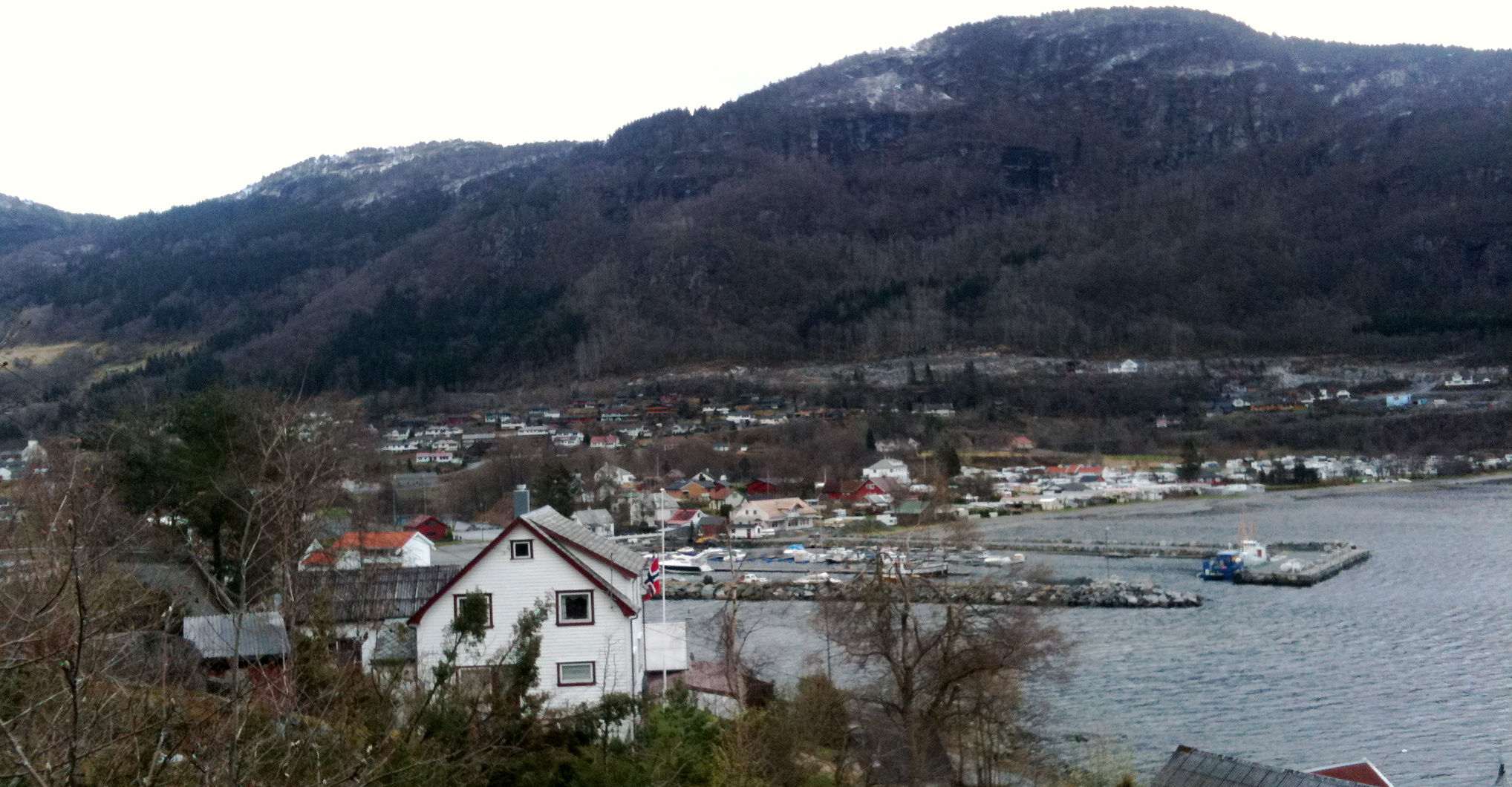
- View of the village of Vikedal

- Rogaland within Norway

- Vikedal within Rogaland
- Coordinates: 59°29′52″N 05°54′21″E
- Country: Norway
- County: Rogaland
- District: Ryfylke
- Established: 1 Jan 1838
  - Created as: Formannskapsdistrikt
- Disestablished: 1 Jan 1965
  - Succeeded by: Vindafjord Municipality
- Administrative centre: Vikedal

Government
  - Mayor (1963–1964): Gunnar Saua (LL)

Area (upon dissolution)
  - Total: 134.03 km^{2} (51.75 sq mi)
  - Rank: #389 in Norway
- Highest elevation: 1,013.75 m (3,326.0 ft)

Population (1964)
  - Total: 977
  - Rank: #484 in Norway
  - Density: 7.3/km^{2} (19/sq mi)
  - Change (10 years): ▲ +3.5%

Official language
  - Norwegian form: Nynorsk
- Time zone: UTC+01:00 (CET)
  - Summer (DST): UTC+02:00 (CEST)
- ISO 3166 code: NO-1157

Vikedal is a former municipality in Rogaland county, Norway. The 134-square-kilometre (52 sq mi) municipality existed from 1838 until its dissolution in 1965. The area is now part of Vindafjord Municipality in the traditional district of Ryfylke. The administrative centre was the village of Vikedal where Vikedal Church is located.

Prior to its dissolution in 1965, the 134.03-square-kilometre (51.75 sq mi) municipality was the th largest by area out of the 525 municipalities in Norway. Vikedal Municipality was the 484th most populous municipality in Norway with a population of about 977. The municipality's population density was 7.3 inhabitants per square kilometre (19/sq mi) and its population had increased by 3.5% over the previous 10-year period.

== General information ==
The parish of Vikedal was created as a municipality on 1 January 1838 (see formannskapsdistrikt law). On 1 January 1923 when the large Vikedal Municipality was divided into three:

- the southeastern part (population: 604) became the new Imsland Municipality
- the northern part (population: 558) became the new Sandeid Municipality
- the central part (population: 924) remained as a smaller Vikedal Municipality

On 1 January 1965, the municipality was dissolved due to recommendations of the Schei Committee and its lands were divided as follows:

- the Hapnes and Dokskar farms on the south side of the Yrkefjorden (population: 2) was merged with Nedstrand Municipality, Tysvær Municipality, and parts of Avaldsnes Municipality, Skjold Municipality, and Vats Municipality to form a larger Tysvær Municipality
- the rest of Vikedal Municipality (population: 978) was merged with parts of Imsland Municipality, Skjold Municipality, and Vats Municipality, as well as all of Sandeid Municipality to form the new Vindafjord Municipality

=== Name ===
The municipality (originally the parish) is named after the old Vikedal farm (Old Norse: Víkadalr) since the first Vikedal Church was built there. The first element is the plural genitive case of vík which means "bay" or "cove". The last element is dalr which means "valley" or "dale". The farm is located at the mouth of the main river that runs through the valley where it flows out into a bay along the fjord.

=== Churches ===
The Church of Norway had one parish (sokn) within Vikedal Municipality. At the time of the municipal dissolution, it was part of the Vikedal prestegjeld and the Ryfylke prosti (deanery) in the Diocese of Stavanger.

Churches in Vikedal Municipality
Parish (sokn)	Church name	Location of the church	Year built
Vikedal	Vikedal Church	Vikedal	1881

== Geography ==
Vikedal Municipality was located along the Vindafjorden and Sandeidfjorden in the northern part of the Ryfylke district. The highest point in the municipality was the 1,013.75-metre (3,326.0 ft) tall mountain Bjørndalsnuten. Sand Municipality and Imsland Municipality were located to the east, Jelsa Municipality was located to the southeast, Nedstrand Municipality was located to the southwest, Vats Municipality was located to the west, Sandeid Municipality was located to the north, and Etne Municipality was located to the northeast.

== Government ==
While it existed, Vikedal Municipality was responsible for primary education (through 10th grade), outpatient health services, senior citizen services, welfare and other social services, zoning, economic development, and municipal roads and utilities. The municipality was governed by a municipal council of directly elected representatives. The mayor was indirectly elected by a vote of the municipal council. The municipality was under the jurisdiction of the Ryfylke District Court and the Gulating Court of Appeal.

=== Municipal council ===
The municipal council (Heradsstyre) of Vikedal Municipality was made up of 17 representatives that were elected to four year terms. The tables below show the historical composition of the council by political party.

Vikedal herredsstyre 1963–1964
Party name (in Norwegian)	Number of representatives
Labour Party (Arbeiderpartiet)	3
Joint List(s) of Non-Socialist Parties (Borgerlige Felleslister)	8
Local List(s) (Lokale lister)	6
Total number of members:	17
Note: On 1 January 1965, Vikedal Municipality was divided between Tysvær Municipality and Vindafjord Municipality.

Vikedal herredsstyre 1959–1963
Party name (in Norwegian)	Number of representatives
Labour Party (Arbeiderpartiet)	3
Joint List(s) of Non-Socialist Parties (Borgerlige Felleslister)	8
Local List(s) (Lokale lister)	6
Total number of members:	17

Vikedal herredsstyre 1955–1959
Party name (in Norwegian)	Number of representatives
Labour Party (Arbeiderpartiet)	3
Joint List(s) of Non-Socialist Parties (Borgerlige Felleslister)	9
Local List(s) (Lokale lister)	5
Total number of members:	17

Vikedal herredsstyre 1951–1955
Party name (in Norwegian)	Number of representatives
Labour Party (Arbeiderpartiet)	3
Joint List(s) of Non-Socialist Parties (Borgerlige Felleslister)	8
Local List(s) (Lokale lister)	5
Total number of members:	16

Vikedal herredsstyre 1947–1951
Party name (in Norwegian)	Number of representatives
Local List(s) (Lokale lister)	16
Total number of members:	16

Vikedal herredsstyre 1945–1947
Party name (in Norwegian)	Number of representatives
Labour Party (Arbeiderpartiet)	4
Christian Democratic Party (Kristelig Folkeparti)	2
Joint List(s) of Non-Socialist Parties (Borgerlige Felleslister)	8
Local List(s) (Lokale lister)	2
Total number of members:	16

Vikedal herredsstyre 1937–1941*
Party name (in Norwegian)	Number of representatives
Labour Party (Arbeiderpartiet)	2
Farmers' Party (Bondepartiet)	6
Joint list of the Conservative Party (Høyre) and the Free-minded People's Party (Frisinnede Folkeparti)	3
Local List(s) (Lokale lister)	5
Total number of members:	16
Note: Due to the German occupation of Norway during World War II, no elections were held for new municipal councils until after the war ended in 1945.

=== Mayors ===
The mayor (Nynorsk: ordførar) of Vikedal Municipality was the political leader of the municipality and the chairperson of the municipal council. The following people have held this position:

- 1838–1845: Rev. Ole Nicolai Løberg
- 1846–1847: Svend T. Rønnevig
- 1848–1849: Henrik Rasmussen Vigedal
- 1850–1853: Rev. August Thorvald Deinboll
- 1854–1855: Johannes Olsen Røgletvedt
- 1856–1857: Rasmus E. Viland
- 1858–1861: Knud O. Monrad
- 1862–1863: Johannes Olsen Røgletvedt
- 1864–1865: Ole S. Strandnæs
- 1866–1869: Henning Meidell
- 1870–1873: Jens Pedersen Hundseid
- 1874–1877: Henning Meidell
- 1878–1881: Jens Pedersen Hundseid
- 1882–1895: Ambjørn O. Birkeland
- 1896–1901: Thore P. Thorsen
- 1902–1904: Bjørn T. Nybru
- 1905–1907: Lars J. Vaagen
- 1907–1909: Bjørn T. Nybru
- 1910–1912: Otto Reimers (Bp)
- 1913–1913: Ole L. Søndenaa
- 1914–1916: Otto Reimers (Bp)
- 1916–1922: Torbjørn Moe
- 1923–1925: P. Blikra
- 1926–1928: Lars O. Søndenå
- 1928–1929: Emil Flydal
- 1929–1931: Gustav Høiekvam
- 1931–1942: Lars O. Søndenå
- 1943–1945: Sverre Hallingstad
- 1946–1951: Osmund Dybdal Holthe
- 1951–1955: Emil Flydal
- 1955–1959: Einar S. Andreassen
- 1959–1963: Sofus Opsal (LL)
- 1963–1964: Gunnar Saua (LL)

== See also ==
- List of former municipalities of Norway
