= Erfjord Municipality =

Former municipality in Rogaland, Norway

Erfjord Municipality Erfjord herred
- Former municipality
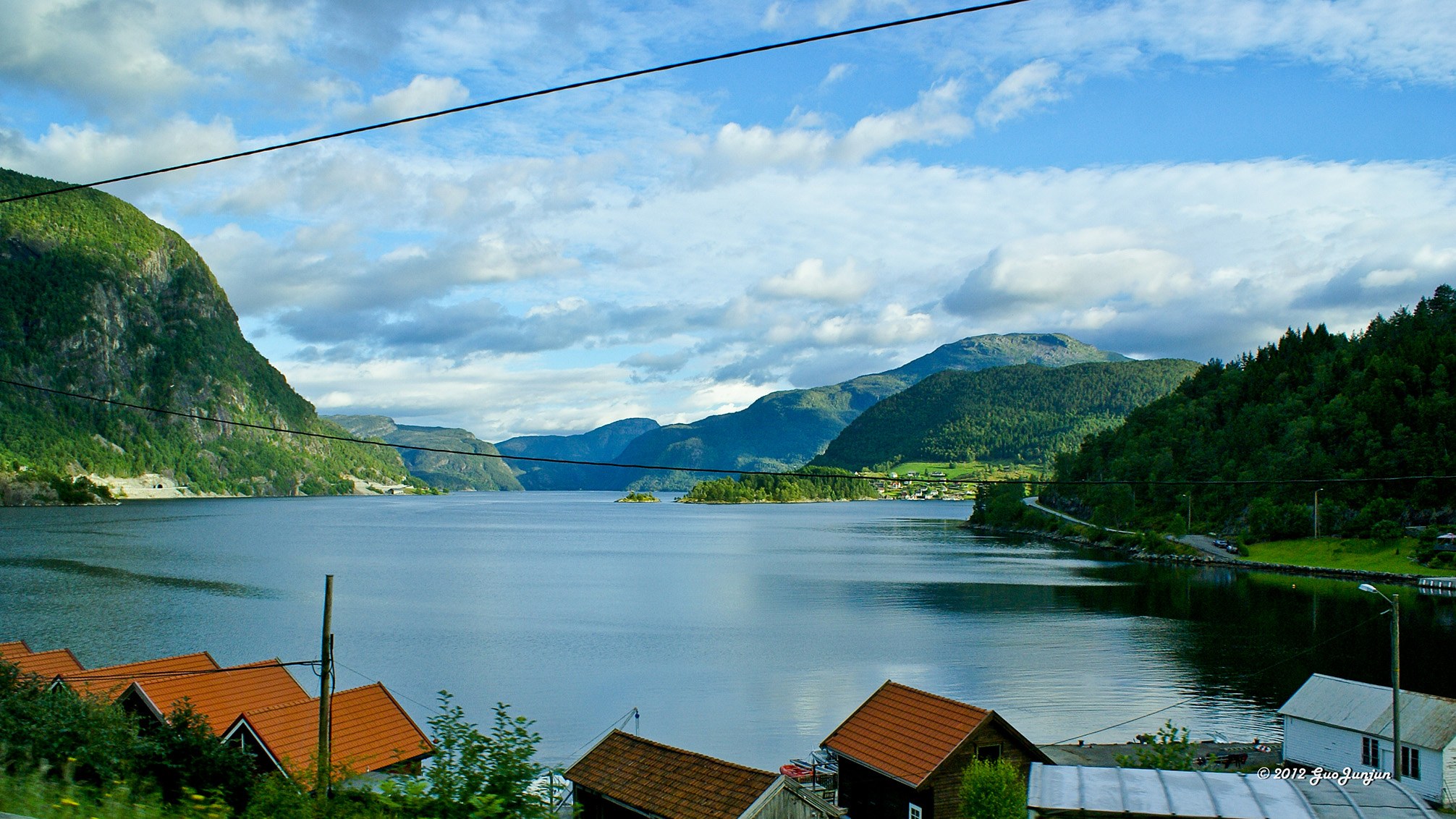
- View of the fjord area

- Rogaland within Norway

- Erfjord within Rogaland
- Coordinates: 59°21′N 06°13′E
- Country: Norway
- County: Rogaland
- District: Ryfylke
- Established: 1 Jan 1914
  - Preceded by: Jelsa Municipality
- Disestablished: 1 Jan 1965
  - Succeeded by: Suldal Municipality
- Administrative centre: Hålandsosen

Government
  - Mayor (1963–1964): Ola Natland

Area (upon dissolution)
  - Total: 131.8 km^{2} (50.9 sq mi)
  - Rank: #391 in Norway
- Highest elevation: 964 m (3,163 ft)

Population (1964)
  - Total: 597
  - Rank: #517 in Norway
  - Density: 4.5/km^{2} (12/sq mi)
  - Change (10 years): ▼ −3.4%

Official language
  - Norwegian form: Neutral
- Time zone: UTC+01:00 (CET)
  - Summer (DST): UTC+02:00 (CEST)
- ISO 3166 code: NO-1137

Erfjord is a former municipality in Rogaland county, Norway. The 131.8-square-kilometre (50.9 sq mi) municipality existed from 1914 until its dissolution in 1965. The area is now part of Suldal Municipality in the traditional district of Ryfylke. The administrative centre was the village of Hålandsosen, where the Erfjord Church is located.

Prior to its dissolution in 1965, the 131.8-square-kilometre (50.9 sq mi) municipality was the 391st largest by area out of the 525 municipalities in Norway. Erfjord Municipality was the 517th most populous municipality in Norway with a population of about 597. The municipality's population density was 4.5 inhabitants per square kilometre (12/sq mi) and its population had decreased by 3.4% over the previous 10-year period.

== General information ==
The municipality of Erfjord was established on 1 January 1914, when Jelsa Municipality was divided in two: the eastern district (population: 617) became the new Erfjord Municipality and the western district (population: 1,539) remained as a smaller Jelsa Municipality.

During the 1960s, there were many municipal mergers across Norway due to the work of the Schei Committee. On 1 January 1965, Erfjord Municipality was dissolved. The following areas were merged to form a new, larger Suldal Municipality:

- all of Suldal Municipality (population: 1,412)
- all of Sand Municipality (population: 1,135)
- all of Erfjord Municipality (population: 610)
- most of Jelsa Municipality (population: 928), except for the areas of Jelsa located on the island of Ombo which became part of Finnøy Municipality and Hjelmeland Municipality
- the part of Imsland Municipality that was located south of the Vindafjorden (population: 61)

=== Name ===
The municipality (originally the parish) is named after the old Erfjord farm (Old Norse: Elrifjǫrðr or Æðrafjǫrðr) since the first Erfjord Church was built there. The meaning of the first element of the name is uncertain, but there are two strong possibilities. The first possibility is that it comes from the word elri which means "alder", a type of common tree in the area (the more modern local name is ør which sounds a lot like Er-). The other main possibility is that it comes from the word æðr which means "eider", a local type of waterfowl. The last element is fjǫrðr which means "fjord".

=== Churches ===
The Church of Norway had one parish (sokn) within Erfjord Municipality. At the time of the municipal dissolution, it was part of the Jelsa prestegjeld and the Ryfylke prosti (deanery) in the Diocese of Stavanger.

Churches in Erfjord Municipality
Parish (sokn)	Church name	Location of the church	Year built
Erfjord	Erfjord Church	Hålandsosen	1877

== Geography ==
The municipality was centered around the Erfjorden. The highest point in the municipality was the 962-metre (3,156 ft) tall mountain Nattlandsnuten. Sand Municipality was located to the north, Suldal Municipality was located to the east, Hjelmeland Municipality was located to the south, and Jelsa Municipality was located to the west.

== Government ==
While it existed, Erfjord Municipality was responsible for primary education (through 10th grade), outpatient health services, senior citizen services, welfare and other social services, zoning, economic development, and municipal roads and utilities. The municipality was governed by a municipal council of directly elected representatives. The mayor was indirectly elected by a vote of the municipal council. The municipality was under the jurisdiction of the Ryfylke District Court and the Gulating Court of Appeal.

=== Municipal council ===
The municipal council (Herredsstyre) of Erfjord Municipality was made up of 13 representatives that were elected to four year terms. The tables below show the historical composition of the council by political party.

Erfjord herredsstyre 1963–1964
Party name (in Norwegian)	Number of representatives
Local List(s) (Lokale lister)	13
Total number of members:	13
Note: On 1 January 1965, Erfjord Municipality became part of Suldal Municipality.

Erfjord herredsstyre 1959–1963
Party name (in Norwegian)	Number of representatives
Local List(s) (Lokale lister)	13
Total number of members:	13

Erfjord herredsstyre 1955–1959
Party name (in Norwegian)	Number of representatives
Local List(s) (Lokale lister)	13
Total number of members:	13

Erfjord herredsstyre 1951–1955
Party name (in Norwegian)	Number of representatives
Local List(s) (Lokale lister)	12
Total number of members:	12

Erfjord herredsstyre 1947–1951
Party name (in Norwegian)	Number of representatives
Local List(s) (Lokale lister)	12
Total number of members:	12

Erfjord herredsstyre 1945–1947
Party name (in Norwegian)	Number of representatives
List of workers, fishermen, and small farmholders (Arbeidere, fiskere, småbrukere liste)	7
Local List(s) (Lokale lister)	5
Total number of members:	12

Erfjord herredsstyre 1937–1941*
Party name (in Norwegian)	Number of representatives
Local List(s) (Lokale lister)	12
Total number of members:	12
Note: Due to the German occupation of Norway during World War II, no elections were held for new municipal councils until after the war ended in 1945.

=== Mayors ===
The mayor (Norwegian: ordfører) of Erfjord Municipality was the political leader of the municipality and the chairperson of the municipal council. The following people have held this position:

- 1914–1916: Malenius Lovre
- 1917–1919: Gudmund D. Sørhus
- 1920–1925: Gudmund Håland
- 1926–1928: Malenius Lovre
- 1929–1931: Gudmund Håland
- 1932–1941: Paul P. Bog
- 1942–1943: Magnus Lovre
- 1943–1945: Gudmund Håland
- 1946–1947: Lars Vaage
- 1947–1951: Paul P. Bog
- 1951–1955: Lars Vaage
- 1955–1963: Karl Helgeland
- 1963–1964: Ola Natland

== See also ==
- List of former municipalities of Norway
