= Imslandsjøen =

Village in Vindafjord Municipality, Norway

Imslandsjøen Imsland
- Village
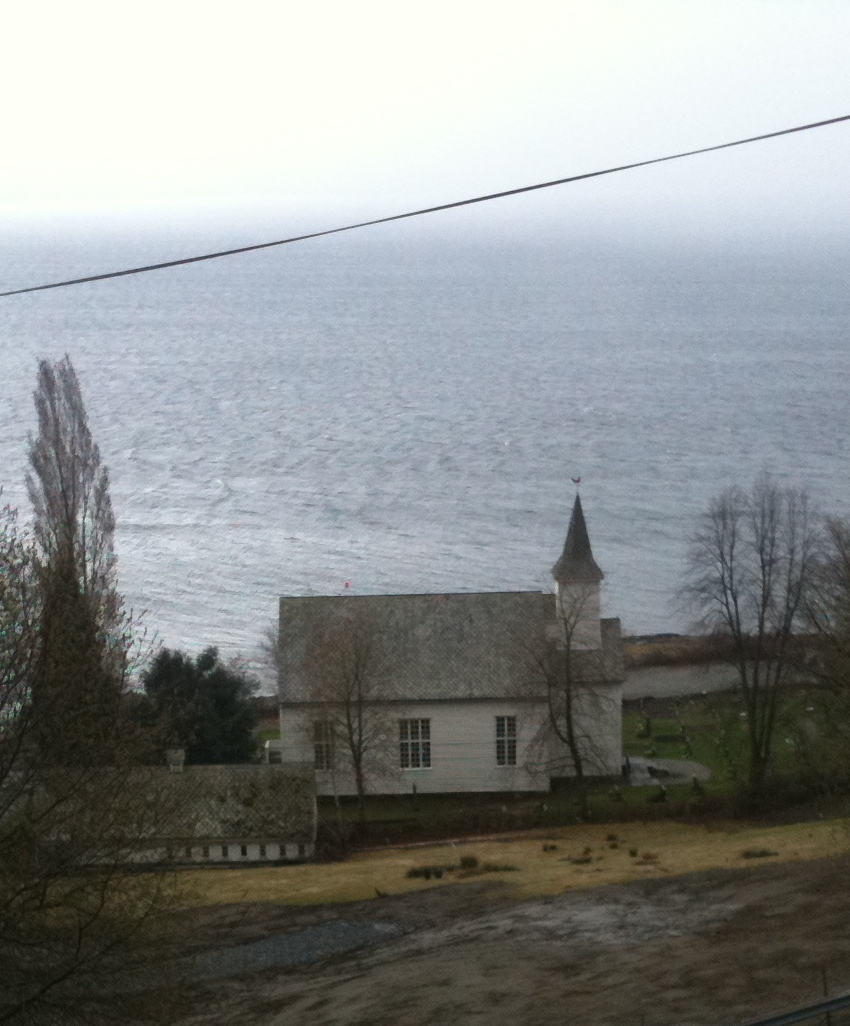
- View of the village church
- Interactive map of Imslandsjøen
- Coordinates: 59.47722°N 5.99197°E
- Country: Norway
- Region: Western Norway
- County: Rogaland
- District: Haugaland
- Municipality: Vindafjord Municipality
- Elevation: 5 m (16 ft)
- Time zone: UTC+01:00 (CET)
  - Summer (DST): UTC+02:00 (CEST)
- Post Code: 5583 Vikedal

Imslandsjøen is a village in Vindafjord Municipality in Rogaland county, Norway. The village is located on the northern shore of the Vindafjorden, about 5 kilometres (3.1 mi) southeast of the village of Vikedal and about 12 kilometres (7.5 mi) west of the village of Sand in neighboring Suldal Municipality. Imsland Church is located in the village.

== History ==
The village was the administrative centre of the old Imsland Municipality which existed from 1923 until 1965 when the municipality was dissolved. Historically, Imslandsjøen had a post office and a steamship stop. Today ships no longer call at the village, and the post office is located in nearby Vikedal.
