= Sandeid Municipality =

Former municipality in Rogaland, Norway

Sandeid Municipality Sandeid herred
- Former municipality
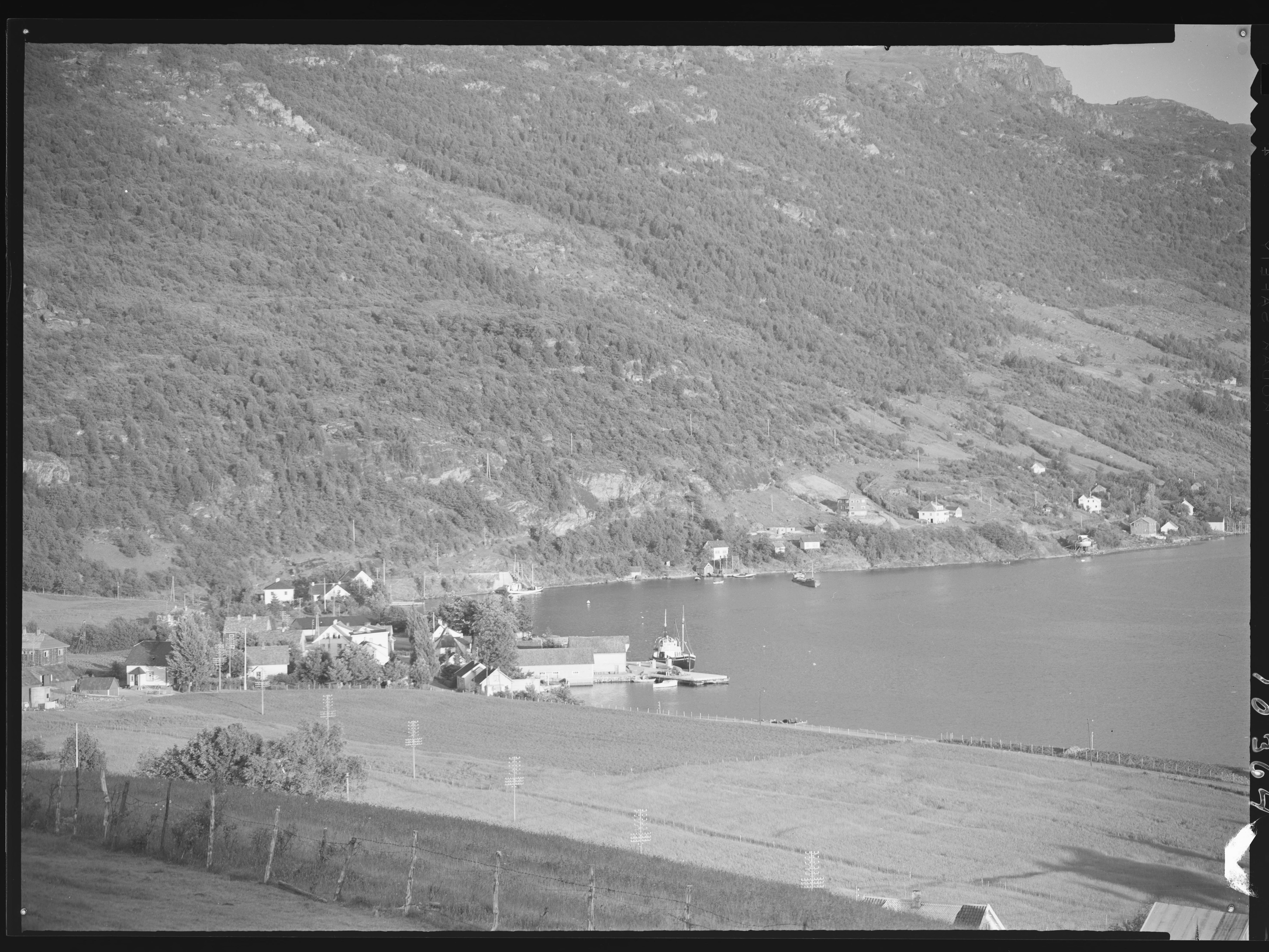
- Sandeid village in the early 20th century

- Rogaland within Norway

- Sandeid within Rogaland
- Coordinates: 59°32′39″N 05°51′44″E
- Country: Norway
- County: Rogaland
- District: Ryfylke
- Established: 1 Jan 1923
  - Preceded by: Vikedal Municipality
- Disestablished: 1 Jan 1965
  - Succeeded by: Vindafjord Municipality
- Administrative centre: Sandeid

Government
  - Mayor (1951–1964): Herlof O. Lærdal (Sp)

Area (upon dissolution)
  - Total: 66.2 km^{2} (25.6 sq mi)
  - Rank: #457 in Norway
- Highest elevation: 755 m (2,477 ft)

Population (1964)
  - Total: 845
  - Rank: #497 in Norway
  - Density: 12.8/km^{2} (33/sq mi)
  - Change (10 years): ▲ +10.2%
- Demonym: Sandeidbu

Official language
  - Norwegian form: Neutral
- Time zone: UTC+01:00 (CET)
  - Summer (DST): UTC+02:00 (CEST)
- ISO 3166 code: NO-1158

Sandeid is a former municipality in Rogaland county, Norway. The 66.2-square-kilometre (25.6 sq mi) municipality existed from 1923 until its dissolution in 1965. The area is now part of Vindafjord Municipality in the traditional district of Haugaland. The administrative centre was the village of Sandeid where Sandeid Church is located.

Prior to its dissolution in 1965, the 66.2-square-kilometre (25.6 sq mi) municipality was the 457th largest by area out of the 525 municipalities in Norway. Sandeid Municipality was the 497th most populous municipality in Norway with a population of about 845. The municipality's population density was 12.8 inhabitants per square kilometre (33/sq mi) and its population had increased by 10.2% over the previous 10-year period.

== General information ==
The municipality was established on 1 January 1923 when the large Vikedal Municipality was divided into three:

- the southeastern part (population: 604) became the new Imsland Municipality
- the northern part (population: 558) became the new Sandeid Municipality
- the central part (population: 924) remained as a smaller Vikedal Municipality

During the 1960s, there were many municipal mergers across Norway due to the work of the Schei Committee. On 1 January 1965, Sandeid Municipality (population: 876) was dissolved and its lands were merged with parts of Imsland Municipality, Vikedal Municipality, Vats Municipality, and Skjold Municipality to form the new Vindafjord Municipality.

=== Name ===
The municipality (originally the parish) is named after an old name for the area, Sandeid (Old Norse: Sandaeið). The first element is the plural genitive case of the word sandr which means "sand". The last element is eið which means "isthmus". Thus it is the sandy area at the isthmus, referring to the isthmus between Ølensjøen and Sandeid.

=== Churches ===
The Church of Norway had one parish (sokn) within Sandeid Municipality. At the time of the municipal dissolution, it was part of the Vikedal prestegjeld and the Ryfylke prosti (deanery) in the Diocese of Stavanger.

Churches in Sandeid Municipality
Parish (sokn)	Church name	Location of the church	Year built
Sandeid	Sandeid Church	Sandeid	1904

== Geography ==
It was located at the northern end of the Sandeidfjorden. The highest point in the municipality was the 755-metre (2,477 ft) tall mountain Hauganuten, a tripoint located on the border with Vikedal Municipality and Etne Municipality (in Hordaland county). Ølen Municipality (in Hordaland county) was located to the north, Etne Municipality (in Hordaland county) was located to the northeast, Vikedal Municipality was located to the east and south, and Vats Municipality was located to the west.

== Government ==
While it existed, Sandeid Municipality was responsible for primary education (through 10th grade), outpatient health services, senior citizen services, welfare and other social services, zoning, economic development, and municipal roads and utilities. The municipality was governed by a municipal council of directly elected representatives. The mayor was indirectly elected by a vote of the municipal council. The municipality was under the jurisdiction of the Ryfylke District Court and the Gulating Court of Appeal.

=== Municipal council ===
The municipal council (Herredsstyre) of Sandeid Municipality was made up of 13 representatives that were elected to four year terms. The tables below show the historical composition of the council by political party.

Sandeid herredsstyre 1963–1964
Party name (in Norwegian)	Number of representatives
Joint List(s) of Non-Socialist Parties (Borgerlige Felleslister)	7
Local List(s) (Lokale lister)	6
Total number of members:	13
Note: On 1 January 1965, Sandeid Municipality became part of Vindafjord Municipality.

Sandeid herredsstyre 1959–1963
Party name (in Norwegian)	Number of representatives
Labour Party (Arbeiderpartiet)	2
Conservative Party (Høyre)	1
Centre Party (Senterpartiet)	6
Liberal Party (Venstre)	1
Local List(s) (Lokale lister)	3
Total number of members:	13

Sandeid herredsstyre 1955–1959
Party name (in Norwegian)	Number of representatives
Conservative Party (Høyre)	1
Farmers' Party (Bondepartiet)	5
Liberal Party (Venstre)	2
Local List(s) (Lokale lister)	5
Total number of members:	13

Sandeid herredsstyre 1951–1955
Party name (in Norwegian)	Number of representatives
Labour Party (Arbeiderpartiet)	1
Conservative Party (Høyre)	2
Farmers' Party (Bondepartiet)	4
Local List(s) (Lokale lister)	5
Total number of members:	12

Sandeid herredsstyre 1947–1951
Party name (in Norwegian)	Number of representatives
Labour Party (Arbeiderpartiet)	1
Liberal Party (Venstre)	2
Joint List(s) of Non-Socialist Parties (Borgerlige Felleslister)	5
Local List(s) (Lokale lister)	4
Total number of members:	12

Sandeid herredsstyre 1945–1947
Party name (in Norwegian)	Number of representatives
Local List(s) (Lokale lister)	12
Total number of members:	12

Sandeid herredsstyre 1937–1941*
Party name (in Norwegian)	Number of representatives
Labour Party (Arbeiderpartiet)	1
Conservative Party (Høyre)	2
Farmers' Party (Bondepartiet)	4
Liberal Party (Venstre)	5
Total number of members:	12
Note: Due to the German occupation of Norway during World War II, no elections were held for new municipal councils until after the war ended in 1945.

=== Mayors ===
The mayor (Norwegian: ordfører) of Sandeid Municipality was the political leader of the municipality and the chairperson of the municipal council. The following people have held this position:

- 1923–1925: Bjørn Skeie
- 1926–1934: Hans J. Helgevold
- 1934–1941: Anfinn Høiekvam
- 1941–1942: Anders R. Hervig
- 1943–1944: Anfinn Høiekvam
- 1945–1945: Andreas Skeie
- 1945–1951: Anders A. Stople
- 1951–1964: Herlof O. Lærdal (Sp)

== See also ==
- List of former municipalities of Norway
