= Vats Municipality =

Former municipality in Rogaland, Norway

Vats Municipality Vats herred
- Former municipality
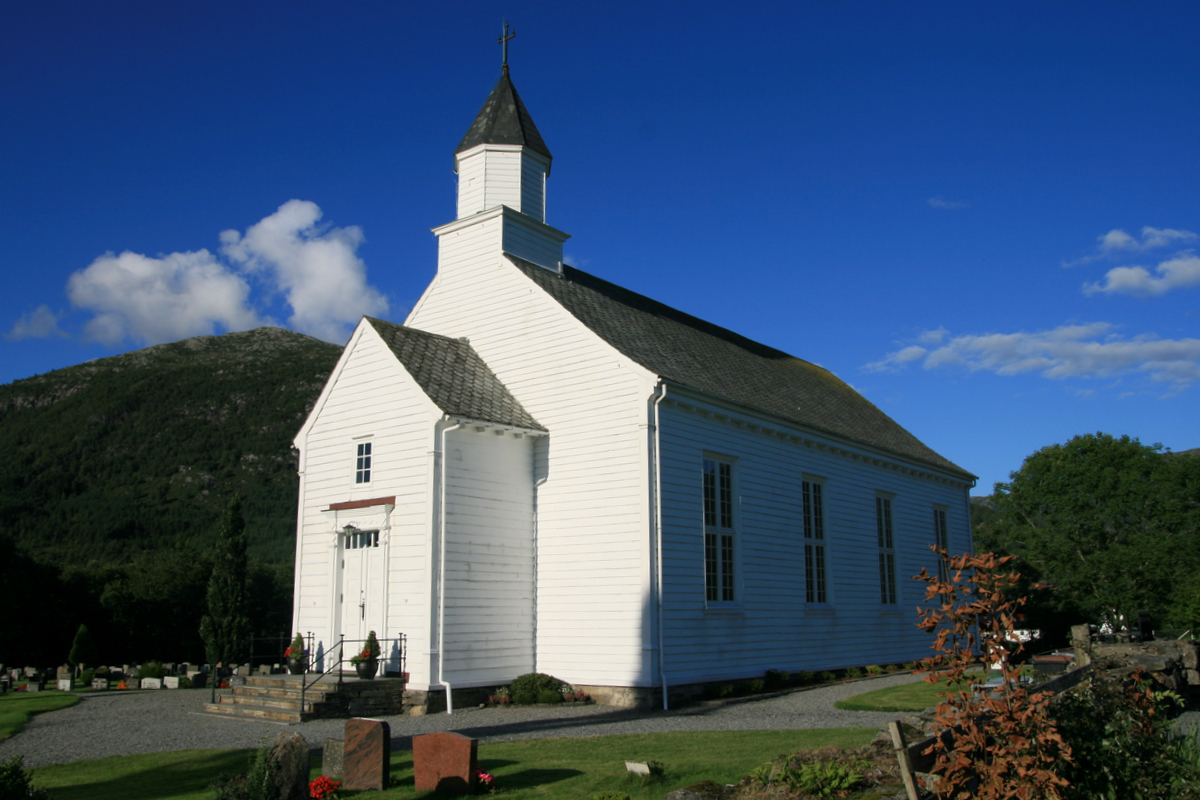
- View of the local church

- Rogaland within Norway

- Vats within Rogaland
- Coordinates: 59°29′30″N 05°44′01″E
- Country: Norway
- County: Rogaland
- District: Ryfylke
- Established: 1 Jan 1891
  - Preceded by: Skjold Municipality
- Disestablished: 1 Jan 1965
  - Succeeded by: Vindafjord Municipality
- Administrative centre: Vats

Government
  - Mayor (1951–1964): Olav Koltveit

Area (upon dissolution)
  - Total: 123.7 km^{2} (47.8 sq mi)
  - Rank: #397 in Norway
- Highest elevation: 735 m (2,411 ft)

Population (1964)
  - Total: 1,126
  - Rank: #477 in Norway
  - Density: 9.1/km^{2} (24/sq mi)
  - Change (10 years): ▼ −7.3%
- Demonym: Vatsbu

Official language
  - Norwegian form: Nynorsk
- Time zone: UTC+01:00 (CET)
  - Summer (DST): UTC+02:00 (CEST)
- ISO 3166 code: NO-1155

Vats is a former municipality in Rogaland county, Norway. The 123.7-square-kilometre (47.8 sq mi) municipality existed from 1891 until its dissolution in 1965. The area is now part of Vindafjord Municipality in the traditional district of Haugaland. The administrative centre was the village of Vats.

Prior to its dissolution in 1965, the 123.7-square-kilometre (47.8 sq mi) municipality was the 397th largest by area out of the 525 municipalities in Norway. Vats Municipality was the 477th most populous municipality in Norway with a population of about 1,126. The municipality's population density was 9.1 inhabitants per square kilometre (24/sq mi) and its population had decreased by 7.3% over the previous 10-year period.

== General information ==
The municipality of Vats was established on 1 January 1891 when Skjold Municipality was divided: the eastern part (population: 1,095) became the new Vats Municipality and the western part (population: 1,961) remained as a smaller Skjold Municipality.

On 1 January 1965, the municipality was dissolved due to recommendations of the Schei Committee and its lands were divided as follows:

- the Breidal and Stølsvik farms on the south side of the Yrkefjorden (population: 16) was merged with Nedstrand Municipality, Tysvær Municipality, and parts of Avaldsnes Municipality, Skjold Municipality, and Vikedal Municipality to form a larger Tysvær Municipality
- the rest of Vats Municipality (population: 1,128) was merged with parts of Imsland Municipality, Skjold Municipality, and Vikedal Municipality, as well as all of Sandeid Municipality to form the new Vindafjord Municipality

=== Name ===
The municipality (originally the parish) is named after the old Vatne farm (Old Norse: Vatn) since the first Vats Church was built there. The name comes from the dative case of the word vatn which means "water", likely referring to the lake know known as Vatsvatnet.

=== Churches ===
The Church of Norway had one parish (sokn) within Vats Municipality. At the time of the municipal dissolution, it was part of the Skjold prestegjeld and the Karmsund prosti (deanery) in the Diocese of Stavanger.

Churches in Vats Municipality
Parish (sokn)	Church name	Location of the church	Year built
Vats	Vats Church	Vats	1855

== Geography ==
The municipality encompassed the land to the east and west surrounding the Vatsfjorden and the lake Vatsvatnet. Vats was typically divided into two parts Øvre Vats (around the lake in the north) and Nedre Vats (around the fjord in the south). The highest point in the municipality was the 735-metre (2,411 ft) tall mountain Døldarheia, located along the border with Sandeid Municipality. Ølen Municipality (in Hordaland county) was located to the north, Sandeid Municipality was located to the northeast, Vikedal Municipality was located to the east, Nedstrand Municipality was located to the south, and Skjold Municipality was located to the west.

== Government ==
While it existed, Vats Municipality was responsible for primary education (through 10th grade), outpatient health services, senior citizen services, welfare and other social services, zoning, economic development, and municipal roads and utilities. The municipality was governed by a municipal council of directly elected representatives. The mayor was indirectly elected by a vote of the municipal council. The municipality was under the jurisdiction of the Karmsund District Court and the Gulating Court of Appeal.

=== Municipal council ===
The municipal council (Heradsstyre) of Vats Municipality was made up of 15 representatives that were elected to four year terms. The tables below show the historical composition of the council by political party.

Vats herredsstyre 1963–1964
Party name (in Norwegian)	Number of representatives
Conservative Party (Høyre)	4
Local List(s) (Lokale lister)	11
Total number of members:	15
Note: On 1 January 1965, Vats Municipality was divided between Tysvær Municipality and Vindafjord Municipality.

Vats herredsstyre 1959–1963
Party name (in Norwegian)	Number of representatives
Conservative Party (Høyre)	1
Local List(s) (Lokale lister)	14
Total number of members:	15

Vats herredsstyre 1955–1959
Party name (in Norwegian)	Number of representatives
Local List(s) (Lokale lister)	15
Total number of members:	15

Vats herredsstyre 1951–1955
Party name (in Norwegian)	Number of representatives
Local List(s) (Lokale lister)	12
Total number of members:	12

Vats herredsstyre 1947–1951
Party name (in Norwegian)	Number of representatives
Local List(s) (Lokale lister)	12
Total number of members:	12

Vats herredsstyre 1945–1947
Party name (in Norwegian)	Number of representatives
List of workers, fishermen, and small farmholders (Arbeidere, fiskere, småbrukere liste)	2
Joint List(s) of Non-Socialist Parties (Borgerlige Felleslister)	4
Local List(s) (Lokale lister)	6
Total number of members:	12

Vats herredsstyre 1937–1941*
Party name (in Norwegian)	Number of representatives
Labour Party (Arbeiderpartiet)	2
Joint List(s) of Non-Socialist Parties (Borgerlige Felleslister)	6
Local List(s) (Lokale lister)	4
Total number of members:	12
Note: Due to the German occupation of Norway during World War II, no elections were held for new municipal councils until after the war ended in 1945.

=== Mayors ===
The mayor (Nynorsk: ordførar) of Vats Municipality was the political leader of the municipality and the chairperson of the municipal council. The following people have held this position:

- 1891–1901: Erik Eriksen Koltveit
- 1901–1907: Carl C. Hatteland
- 1908–1910: Hans Frøland
- 1911–1913: Nils Eidhammer
- 1913–1914: Hans Frøland
- 1914–1917: Erik Eriksen Koltveit
- 1917–1919: Martin E. Eide
- 1920–1922: Tor Alvseike
- 1923–1925: Nils Eidhammer
- 1926–1928: Olav Eide
- 1929–1935: Jakob Hatteland
- 1935–1937: Olav Eide
- 1938–1941: S.M. Eide
- 1941–1944: Anders R. Hervig (NS)
- 1945–1945: Jakob Hatteland
- 1946–1947: Olav Koltveit
- 1948–1951: Thor Alvseike
- 1951–1964: Olav Koltveit

== See also ==
- List of former municipalities of Norway
