= Jelsa, Norway =

Village in Suldal Municipality, Norway

Jelsa
- Village
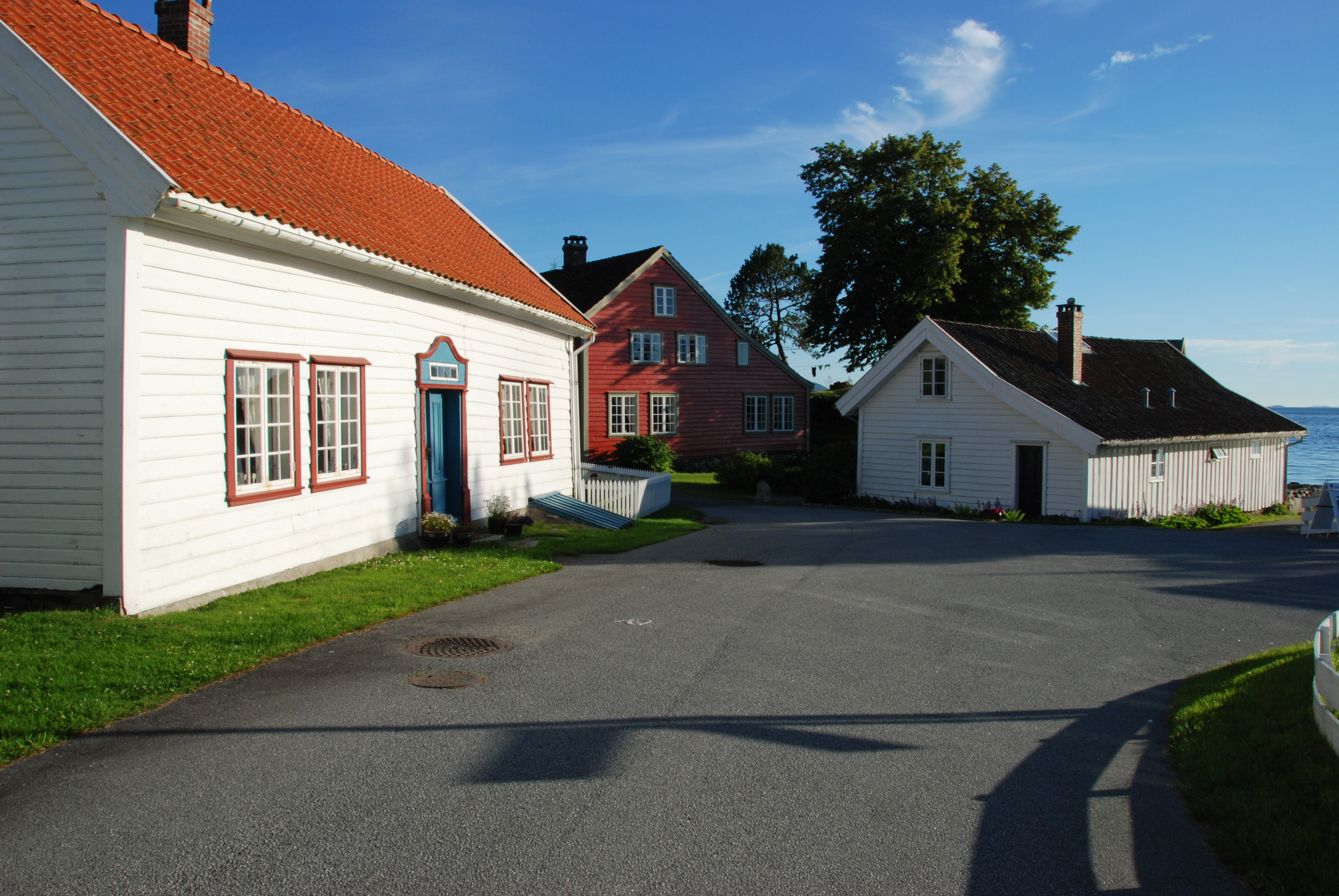
- View of the village
- Interactive map of Jelsa
- Coordinates: 59.33743°N 6.02662°E
- Country: Norway
- Region: Western Norway
- County: Rogaland
- District: Ryfylke
- Municipality: Suldal Municipality
- Elevation: 3 m (9.8 ft)
- Time zone: UTC+01:00 (CET)
  - Summer (DST): UTC+02:00 (CEST)
- Post Code: 4234 Jelsa

Jelsa is a village in Suldal Municipality in Rogaland county, Norway. The village is located along the inner part of the Boknafjorden, near the mouths of the Sandsfjorden and Erfjorden. The village is the site of a school, store, gas station, and some small stores. There was a barrel factory here until it closed in 2009. Jelsa Church is also located in this village.

The village lies along Norwegian county road 517, and it is a regular ferry stop on the route from Nedstrand-Hebnes-Foldøy-Jelsa.

== History ==
The village was the administrative centre of the old Jelsa Municipality which existed from 1838 until 1965.
