= Sandeid =

Village in Vindafjord Municipality, Norway

- Village
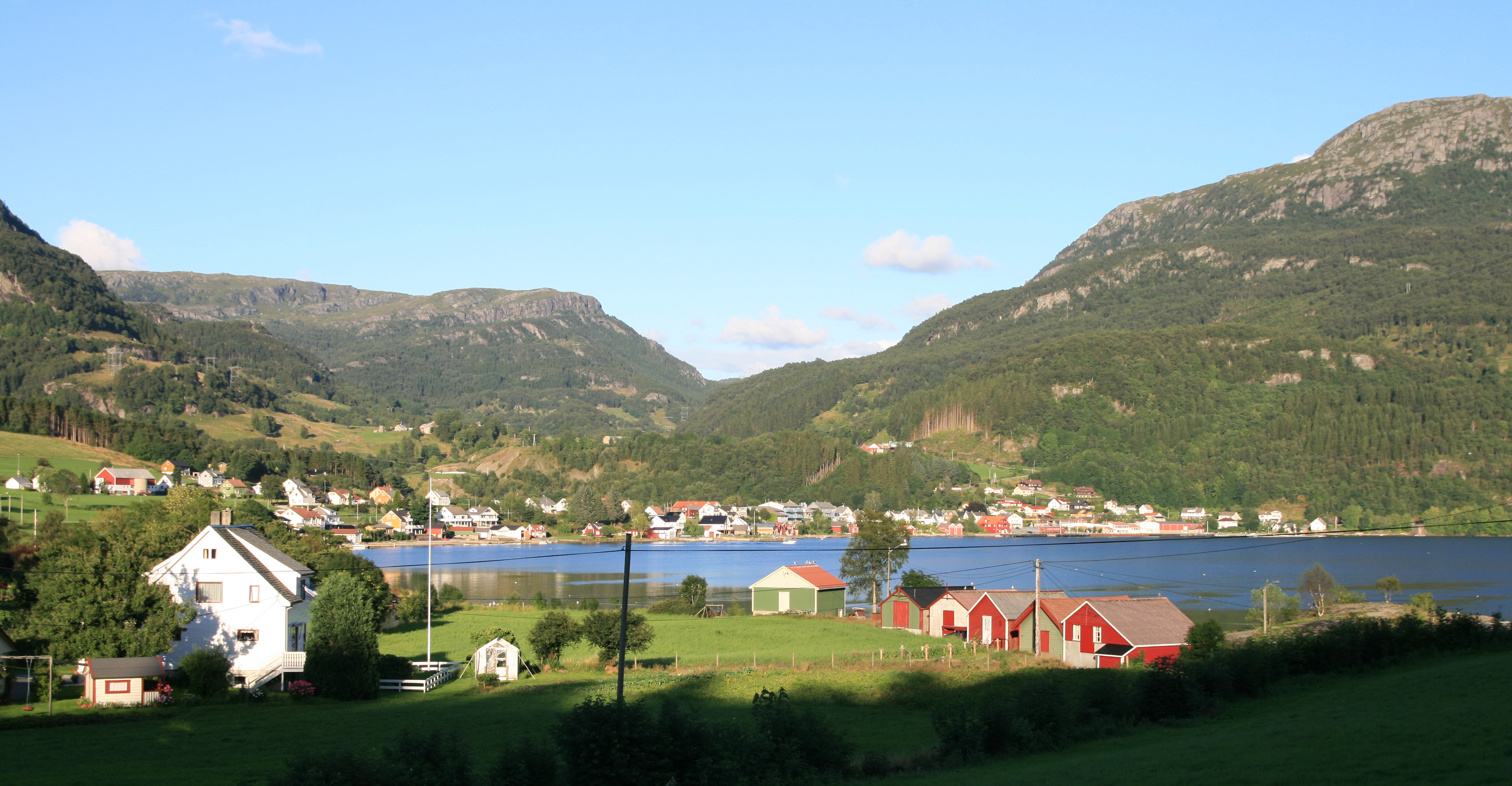
- View of the village
- Interactive map of Sandeid
- Coordinates: 59.54441°N 5.86229°E
- Country: Norway
- Region: Western Norway
- County: Rogaland
- District: Haugaland
- Municipality: Vindafjord Municipality

Area
  - Total: 0.63 km^{2} (0.24 sq mi)
- Elevation: 12 m (39 ft)

Population (2025)
  - Total: 762
  - Density: 1,210/km^{2} (3,100/sq mi)
- Time zone: UTC+01:00 (CET)
  - Summer (DST): UTC+02:00 (CEST)
- Post Code: 5585 Sandeid

Sandeid is a village in Vindafjord Municipality in Rogaland county, Norway. The village is located at the head of the Sandeidfjorden, about 7 kilometres (4.3 mi) northwest of the village of Vikedal and about 11 kilometres (6.8 mi) south of the village of Ølensjøen.

The 0.63-square-kilometre (160-acre) village has a population (2025) of 762 and a population density of 1,210 inhabitants per square kilometre (3,100/sq mi).

Sandeid has a slaughterhouse, sand pits, and a cement factory. Sandeid Church is also located in the village.

== History ==
The village was an administrative centre for many years. It was the administrative centre of the old Sandeid Municipality from 1923 until 1965 when it was merged into Vindafjord Municipality. Then, the village was the administrative centre of Vindafjord Municipality from 1965 until 2006. In 2006, Ølen Municipality was merged into Vindafjord Municipality. Since 2006, the administrative centre of Vindafjord Municipality has been the village of Ølen in what was previously Ølen Municipality.
