= Jelsa Church =

Church in Rogaland, Norway

- Jelsa kyrkje
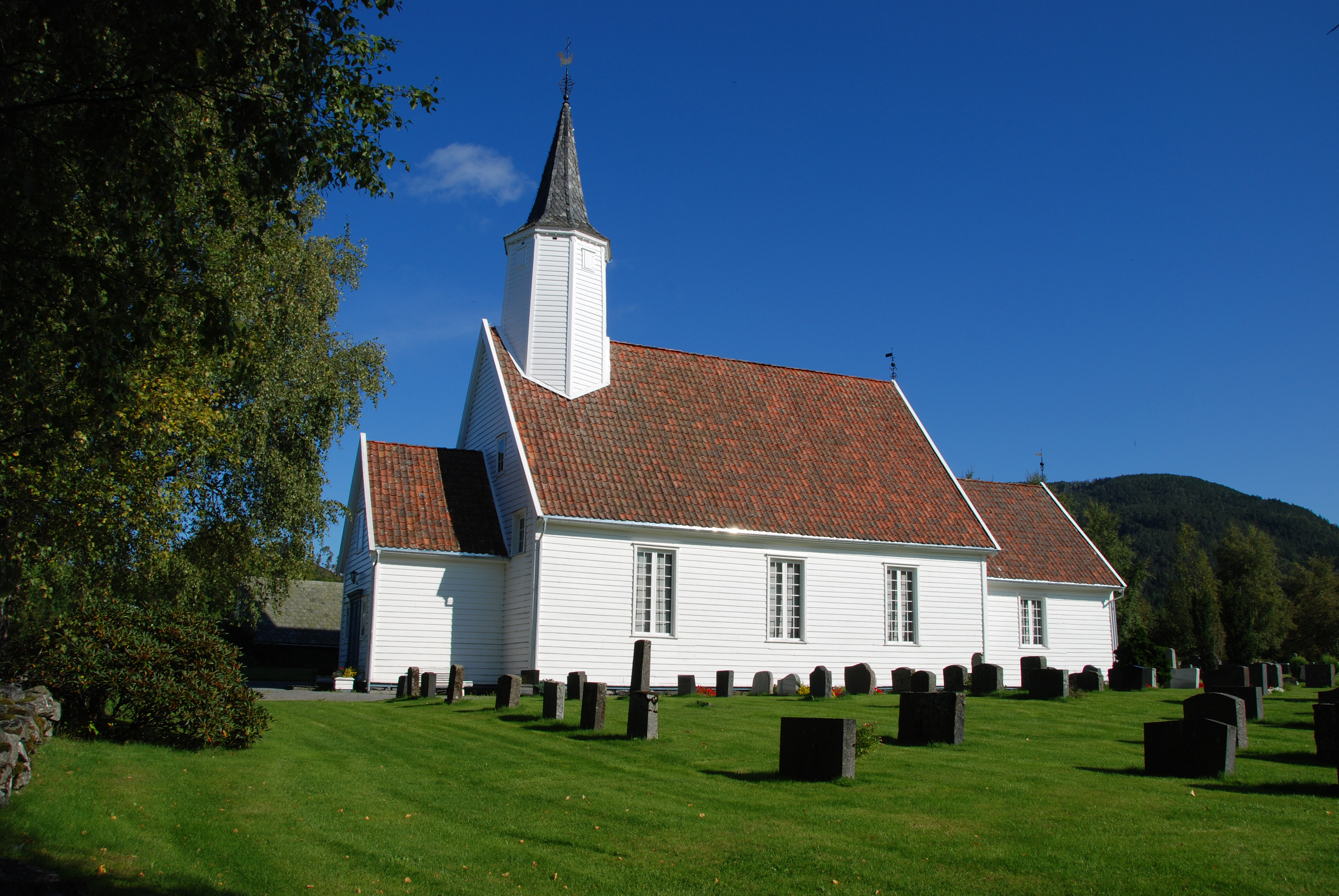
- View of the church
- Jelsa Church
- 59.33849°N 06.025833°E
- Location: Suldal Municipality, Rogaland
- Country: Norway
- Denomination: Church of Norway
- Churchmanship: Evangelical Lutheran

History
- Status: Parish church
- Founded: 12th century
- Consecrated: 1647

Architecture
- Functional status: Active
- Architectural type: Long church
- Completed: 1647

Specifications
- Capacity: 150
- Materials: Wood

Administration
- Diocese: Stavanger bispedømme
- Deanery: Ryfylke prosti
- Parish: Jelsa
- Norwegian Cultural Heritage Site
- Type: Church
- Status: Automatically protected
- ID: 84734

Jelsa Church (Norwegian: Jelsa kyrkje) is a parish church of the Church of Norway in Suldal Municipality in Rogaland county, Norway. It is located in the village of Jelsa. It is the church for the Jelsa parish which is part of the Ryfylke prosti (deanery) in the Diocese of Stavanger. The white, wooden church was built in a long church design in 1647 using designs by an unknown architect. The church seats about 150 people.

== History ==
The earliest existing historical records of the church date back to the year 1280, but it was not new that year. The original church was a stave church that was located on the same site as the present building. In 1647, the old stave church was torn down and replaced. The west gable of the new church appears to have been built of staves from the older church. The new church has a rectangular nave and a somewhat narrower and lower choir.

In 1814, this church served as an election church (Norwegian: valgkirke). Together with more than 300 other parish churches across Norway, it was a polling station for elections to the 1814 Norwegian Constituent Assembly which wrote the Constitution of Norway. This was Norway's first national elections. Each church parish was a constituency that elected people called "electors" who later met together in each county to elect the representatives for the assembly that was to meet at Eidsvoll Manor later that year.

In the 1850s, the church underwent a major restoration and a sacristy was constructed on the east side of the choir and the exterior walls were re-sided. Also, the second floor galleries with additional seating were constructed around the sides of the nave. In 1871, the tower on the west end was demolished and replaced with a larger sacristy and an octagonal steeple was built on the west end of the nave.

In the 1950s, the church was restored and much of the 17th century interior and fixtures were restored. The original ceilings were restored and reconstructed. The ceiling of the nave has a starry sky painted on the ceiling, and in the chancel there are vines and arches with biblical figures painted on the walls. The richly decorated bench rails and doors from the original interior were restored and supplemented. Also, Christian IV's royal monogram was hung above the chancel opening. The pulpit comes from the previous stave church and it was made in 1623-1625.

== Media gallery ==
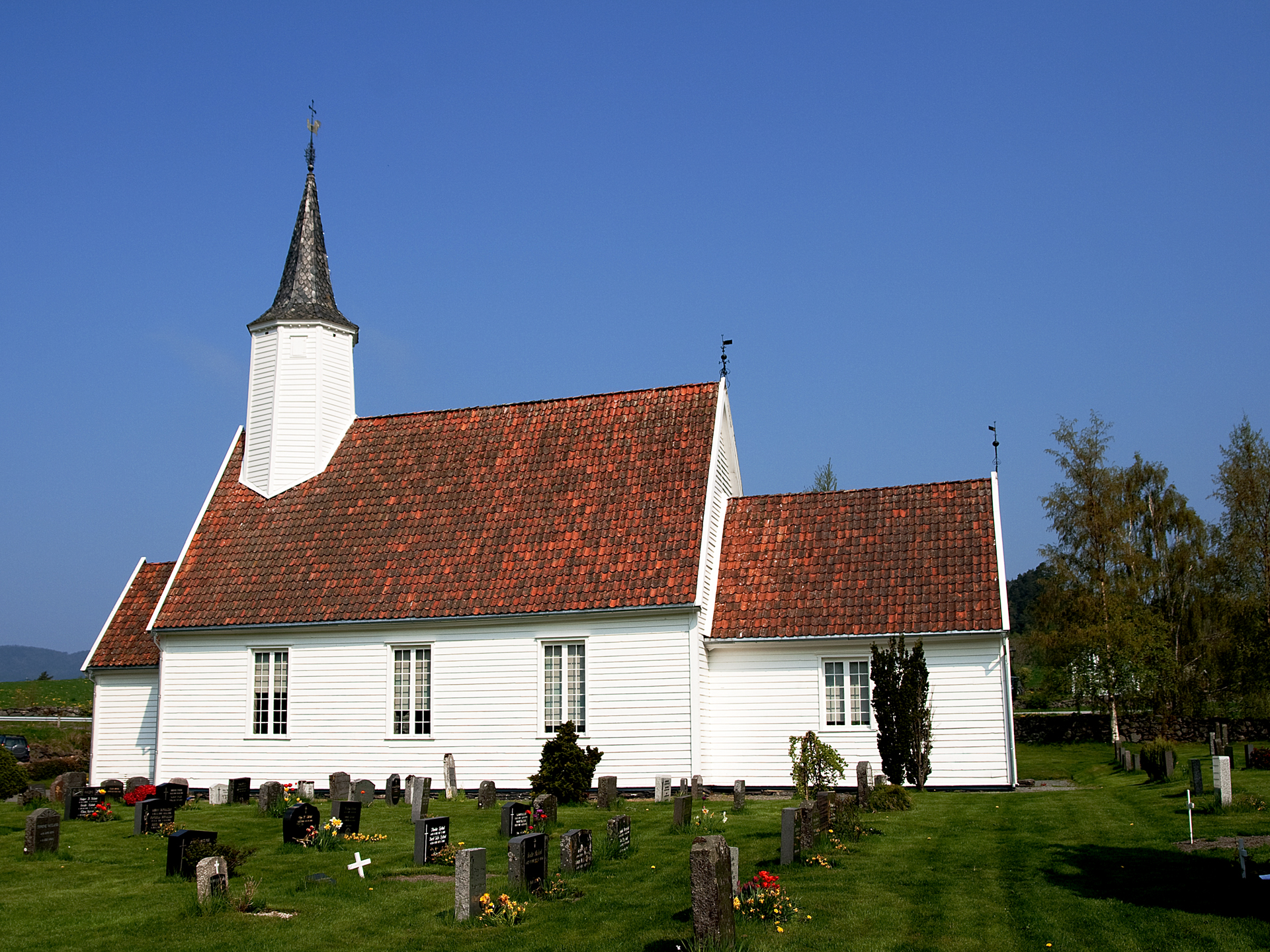

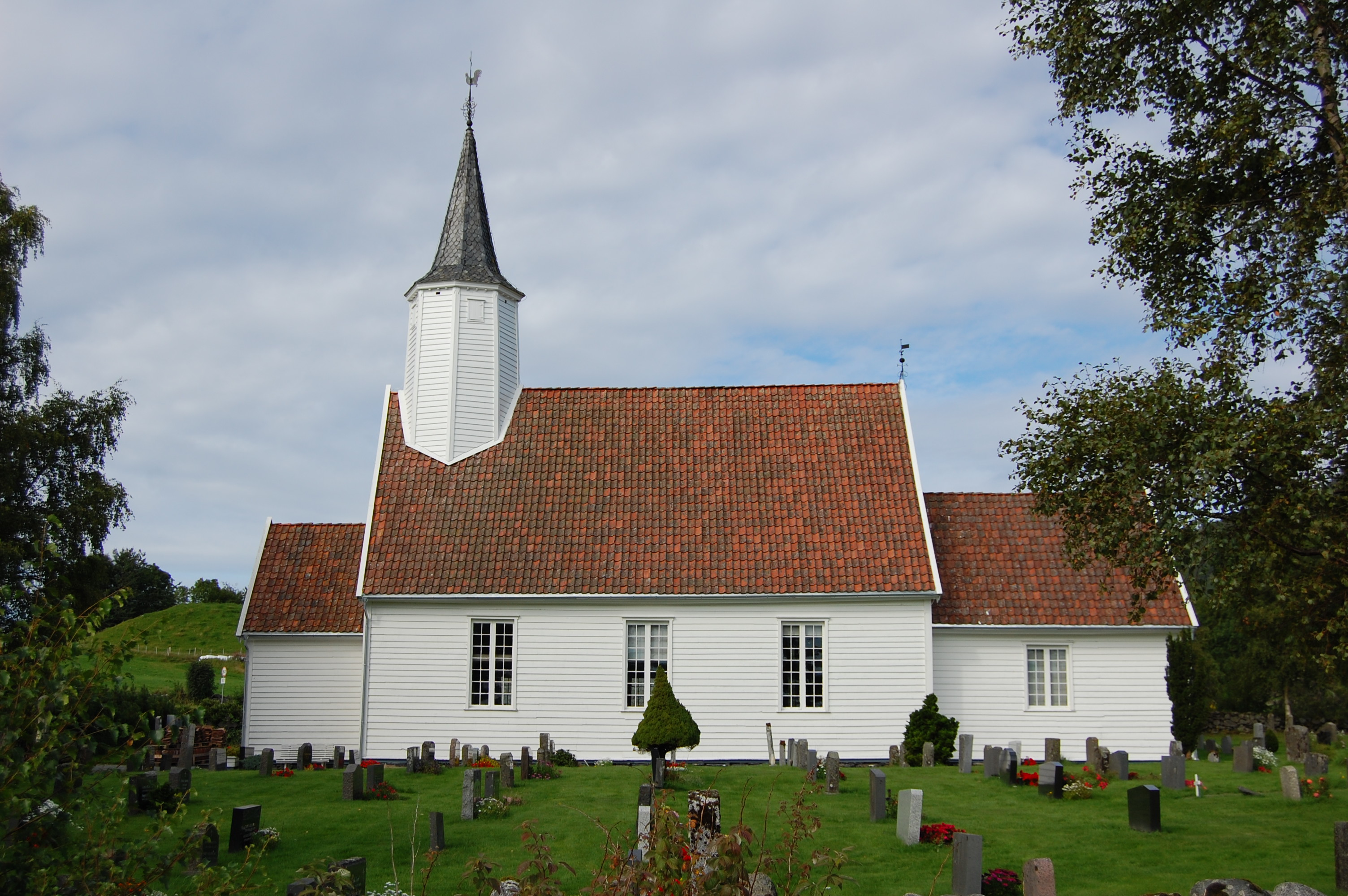

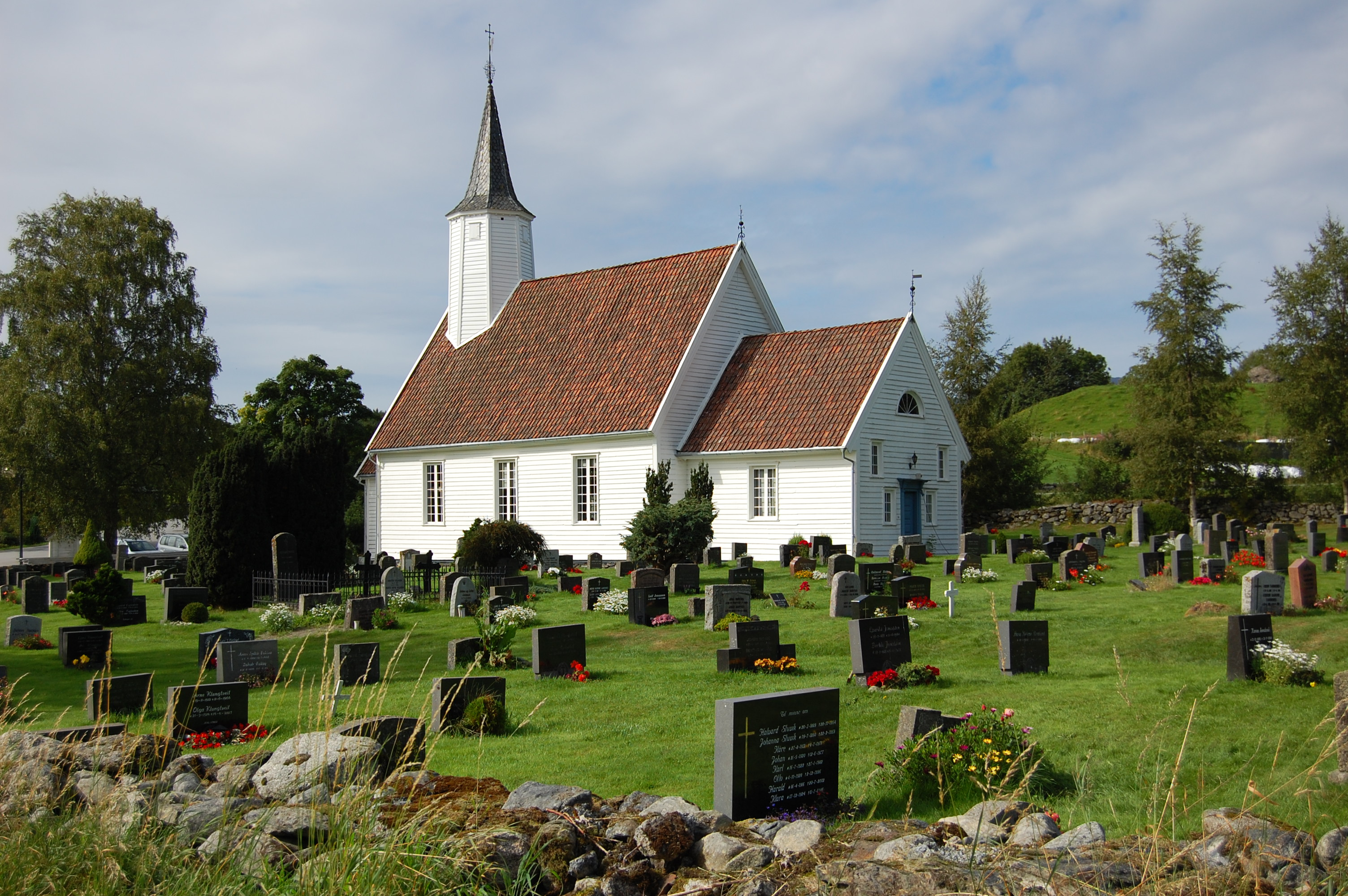

== See also ==
- List of churches in Rogaland
