= Sand, Rogaland =

Village in Suldal Municipality, Norway

Sand
- Village
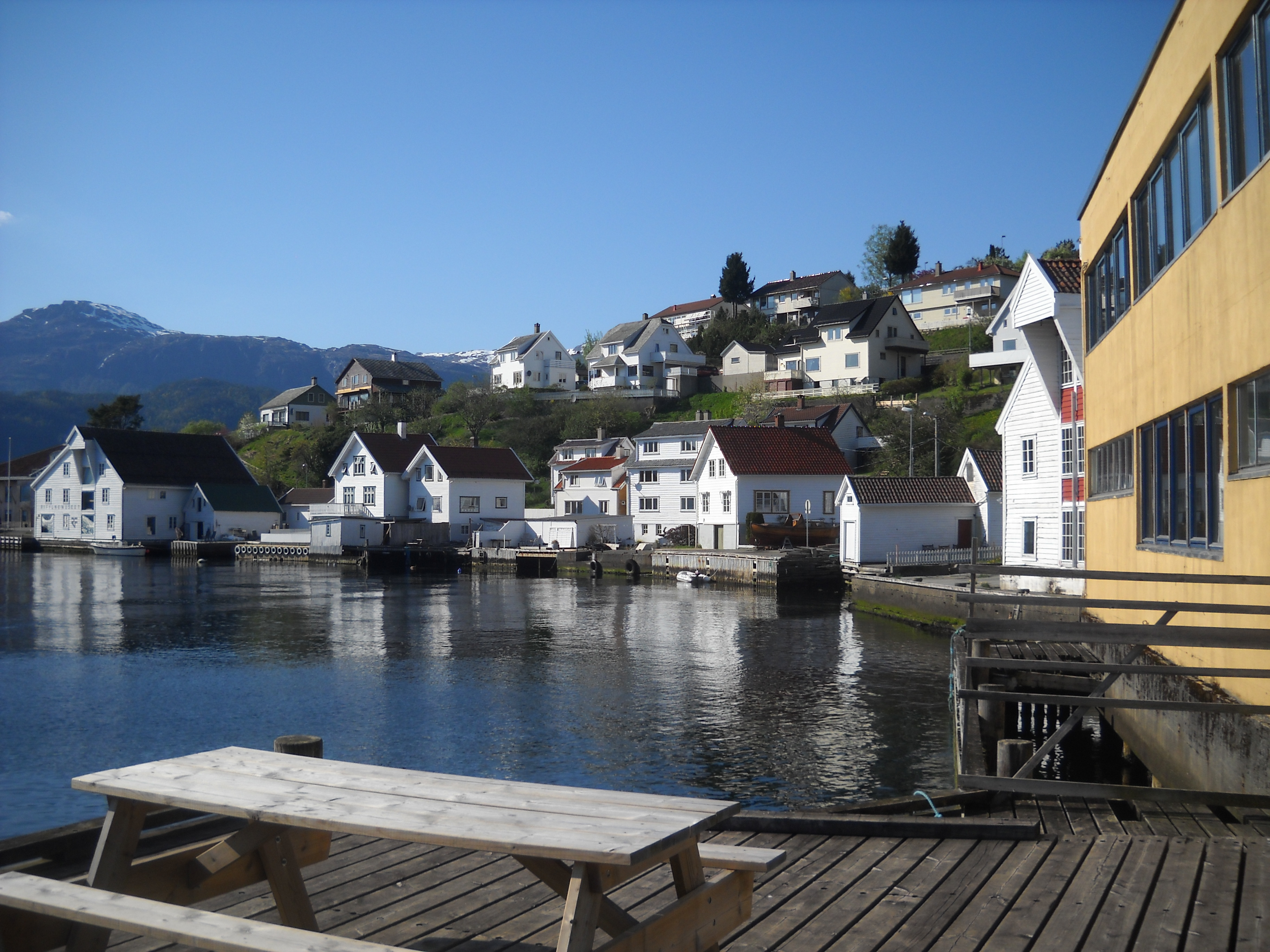
- View of the village
- Interactive map of Sand
- Coordinates: 59.48468°N 6.25109°E
- Country: Norway
- Region: Western Norway
- County: Rogaland
- District: Ryfylke
- Municipality: Suldal Municipality

Area
  - Total: 1.04 km^{2} (0.40 sq mi)
- Elevation: 2 m (6.6 ft)

Population (2025)
  - Total: 1,245
  - Density: 1,197/km^{2} (3,100/sq mi)
- Time zone: UTC+01:00 (CET)
  - Summer (DST): UTC+02:00 (CEST)
- Post Code: 4230 Sand

Sand is the administrative centre of Suldal Municipality in Rogaland county, Norway. The village lies on the shore of the Sandsfjorden at the mouth of the river Suldalslågen, just south of the mouth of the Hylsfjorden. Norwegian National Road 13 runs through the eastern part of the village. Sand Church is also located in the village.

The 1.04-square-kilometre (260-acre) village has a population (2025) of 1,245 and a population density of 1,197 inhabitants per square kilometre (3,100/sq mi).

The newspaper Suldalsposten is published in Sand.
