= Sand Church (Rogaland) =

Church in Rogaland, Norway

- Sand kyrkje
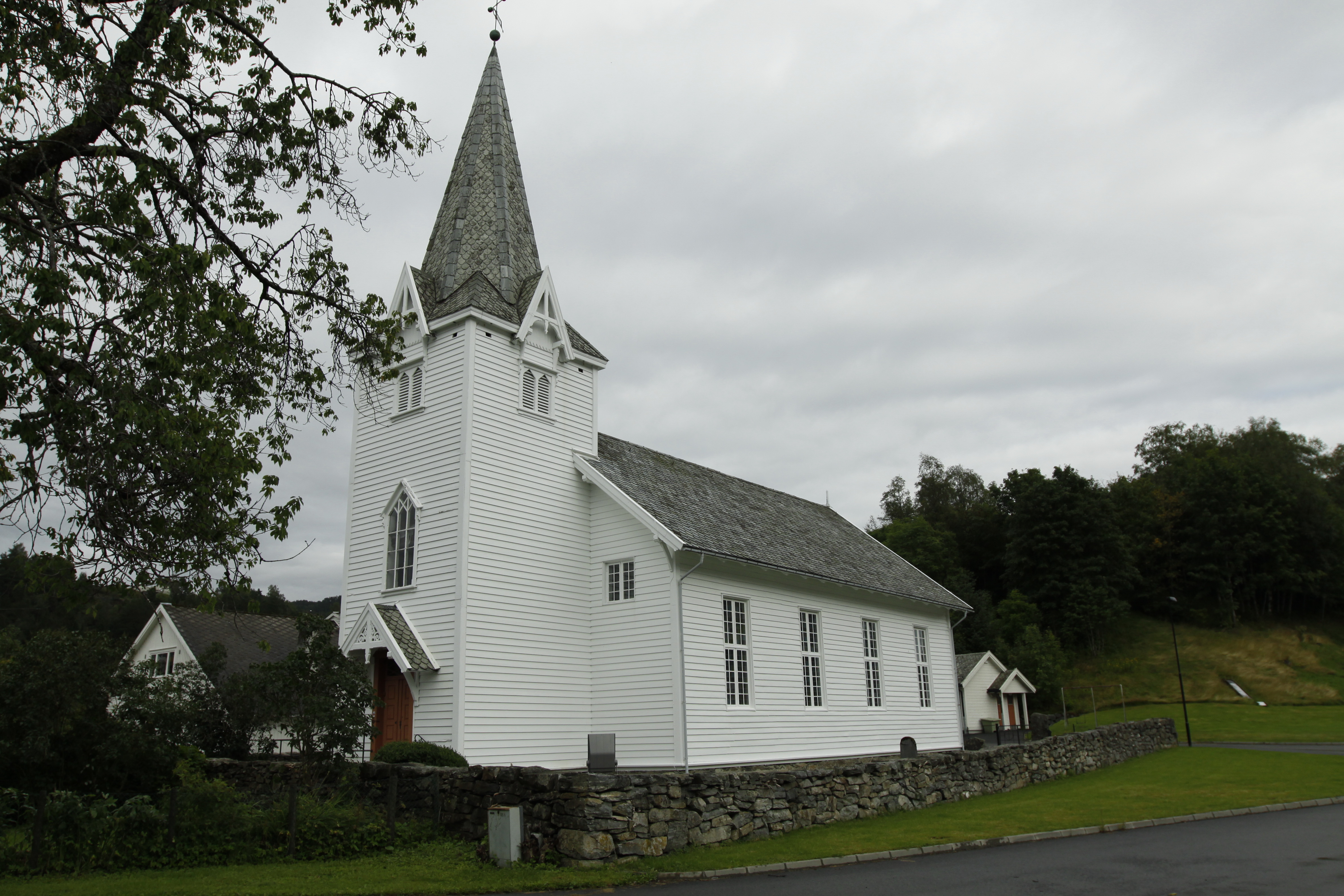
- View of the church
- Sand Church
- 59.48272°N 06.252495°E
- Location: Suldal Municipality, Rogaland
- Country: Norway
- Denomination: Church of Norway
- Churchmanship: Evangelical Lutheran

History
- Status: Parish church
- Founded: 12th century
- Consecrated: 1852

Architecture
- Functional status: Active
- Architect: Hans Linstow
- Architectural type: Long church
- Completed: 1852

Specifications
- Capacity: 450
- Materials: Wood

Administration
- Diocese: Stavanger bispedømme
- Deanery: Ryfylke prosti
- Parish: Sand
- Norwegian Cultural Heritage Site
- Type: Church
- Status: Not protected
- ID: 85370

Sand Church (Norwegian: Sand kyrkje) is a parish church of the Church of Norway in Suldal Municipality in Rogaland county, Norway. It is located in the village of Sand. It is the church for the Sand parish which is part of the Ryfylke prosti (deanery) in the Diocese of Stavanger. The white, wooden church was built in a long church design in 1852 using designs by the architect Hans Linstow. The church seats about 450 people.

== History ==
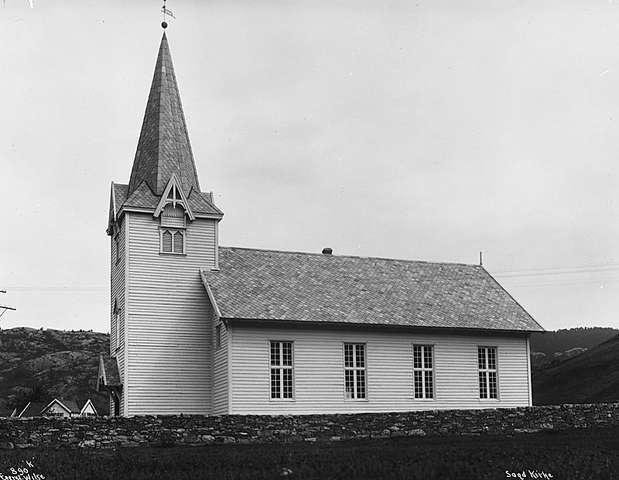
View of the church in 1913.

The earliest existing historical records of the church date back to the year 1283, but it was not new that year. The first church in Sand was a stave church that was built on a high hill about 60 metres (200 ft) east of the present site of the church.

Around the year 1600, the old stave church was torn down and replaced with a timber-framed building on the same site. In 1852, a new church was built at the bottom of the hill, about 60 metres (200 ft) west of the old site of the church. After the new church was completed, the old church was torn down. The old church grounds were converted into a cemetery.

== See also ==
- List of churches in Rogaland
