= Vikedal Church =

Church in Rogaland, Norway

- Vikedal kyrkje
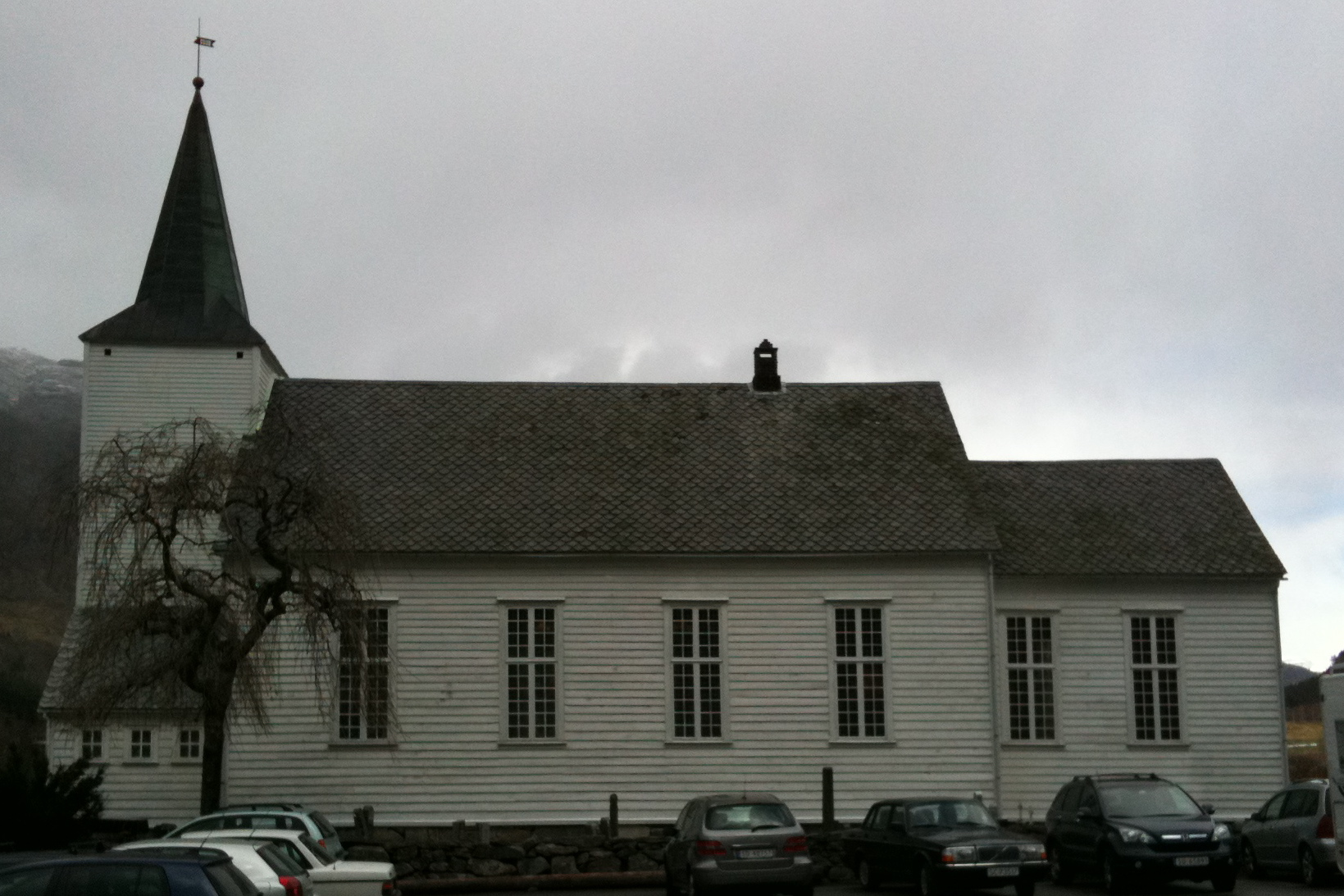
- View of the church
- Vikedal Church
- 59.497077°N 5.910058°E
- Location: Vindafjord Municipality, Rogaland
- Country: Norway
- Denomination: Church of Norway
- Churchmanship: Evangelical Lutheran

History
- Status: Parish church
- Founded: 12th century
- Consecrated: 1881

Architecture
- Functional status: Active
- Architect: Jacob Wilhelm Nordan
- Architectural type: Long church
- Completed: 1881 (145 years ago)

Specifications
- Capacity: 400
- Materials: Wood

Administration
- Diocese: Stavanger bispedømme
- Deanery: Haugaland prosti
- Parish: Vikedal
- Norwegian Cultural Heritage Site
- Type: Church
- Status: Not protected
- ID: 85840

Vikedal Church (Norwegian: Vikedal kyrkje) is a parish church of the Church of Norway in Vindafjord Municipality in Rogaland county, Norway. It is located in the village of Vikedal. It is the church for the Vikedal parish which is part of the Haugaland prosti (deanery) in the Diocese of Stavanger. The white, wooden church was built in a long church style in 1881 using designs by the architect Jacob Wilhelm Nordan. The church seats about 400 people.

== History ==
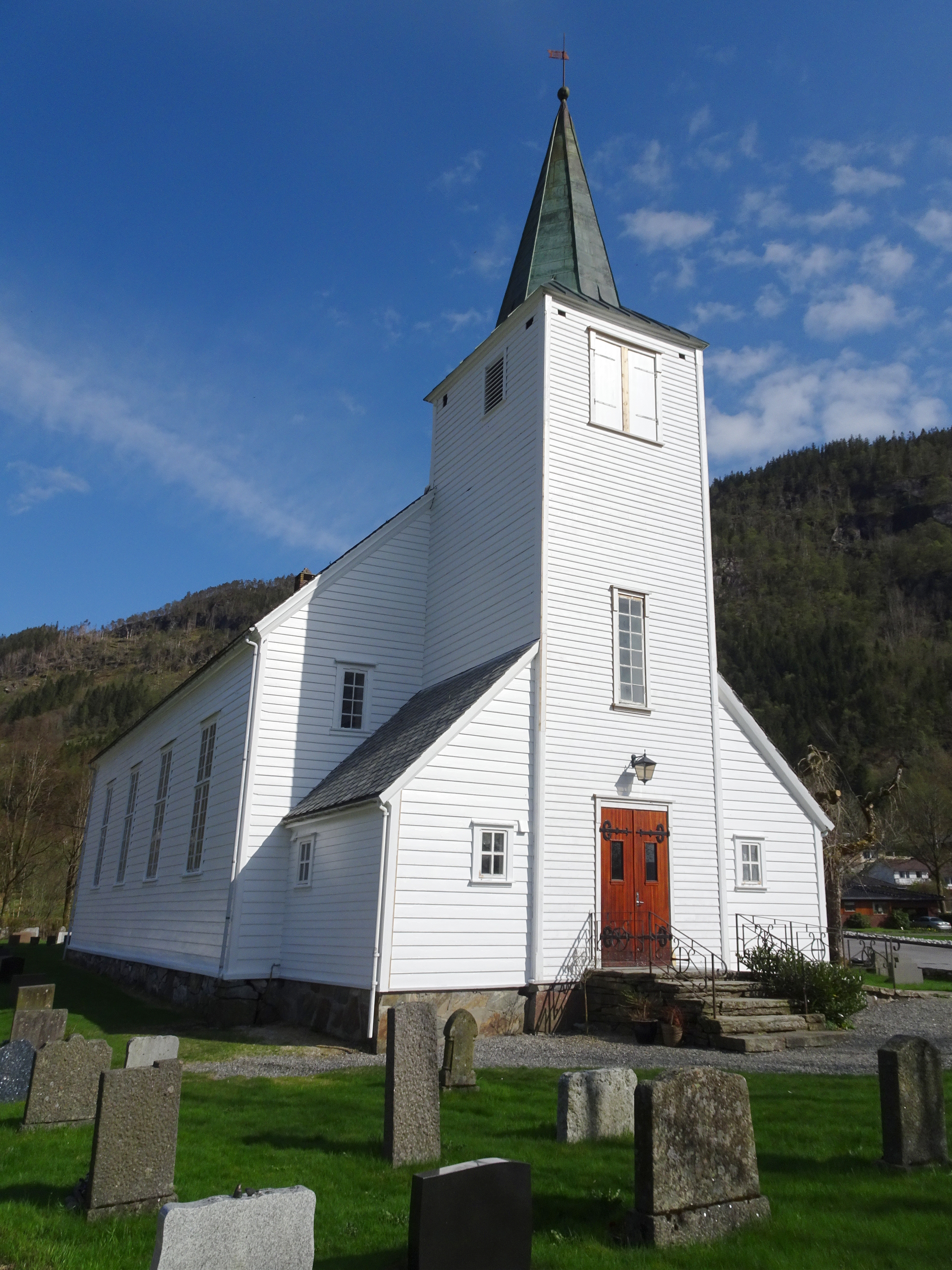
View of the church in 2018

The earliest existing historical records of the church date back to the year 1311, but the church was likely built in the 12th century. The medieval church was probably a stave church and it stood at Sønnanå, about 500 metres (0.31 mi) to the southwest of the present site of the church. During the 1620s, the church underwent a major renovation and then in 1670, the congregation decided to demolish the old church and build a new one on the same site.

In 1814, this church served as an election church (Norwegian: valgkirke). Together with more than 300 other parish churches across Norway, it was a polling station for elections to the 1814 Norwegian Constituent Assembly which wrote the Constitution of Norway. This was Norway's first national elections. Each church parish was a constituency that elected people called "electors" who later met together in each county to elect the representatives for the assembly that was to meet at Eidsvoll Manor later that year.

In the late 1820s and again in 1834, the church was repaired after being struck by lightning and heavily damaged. In 1881, the parish built a new church about 500 metres (0.31 mi) to the northeast. After the new church was consecrated and in use, the old church was closed and in 1883, the old church was torn down. The cemetery surrounding the old church continued to be used for a time after the church was torn down, but eventually the cemetery was closed as well.

== See also ==
- List of churches in Rogaland
