= Vikedal =

Village in Vindafjord Municipality, Norway

Vikedal Vikadal
- Village
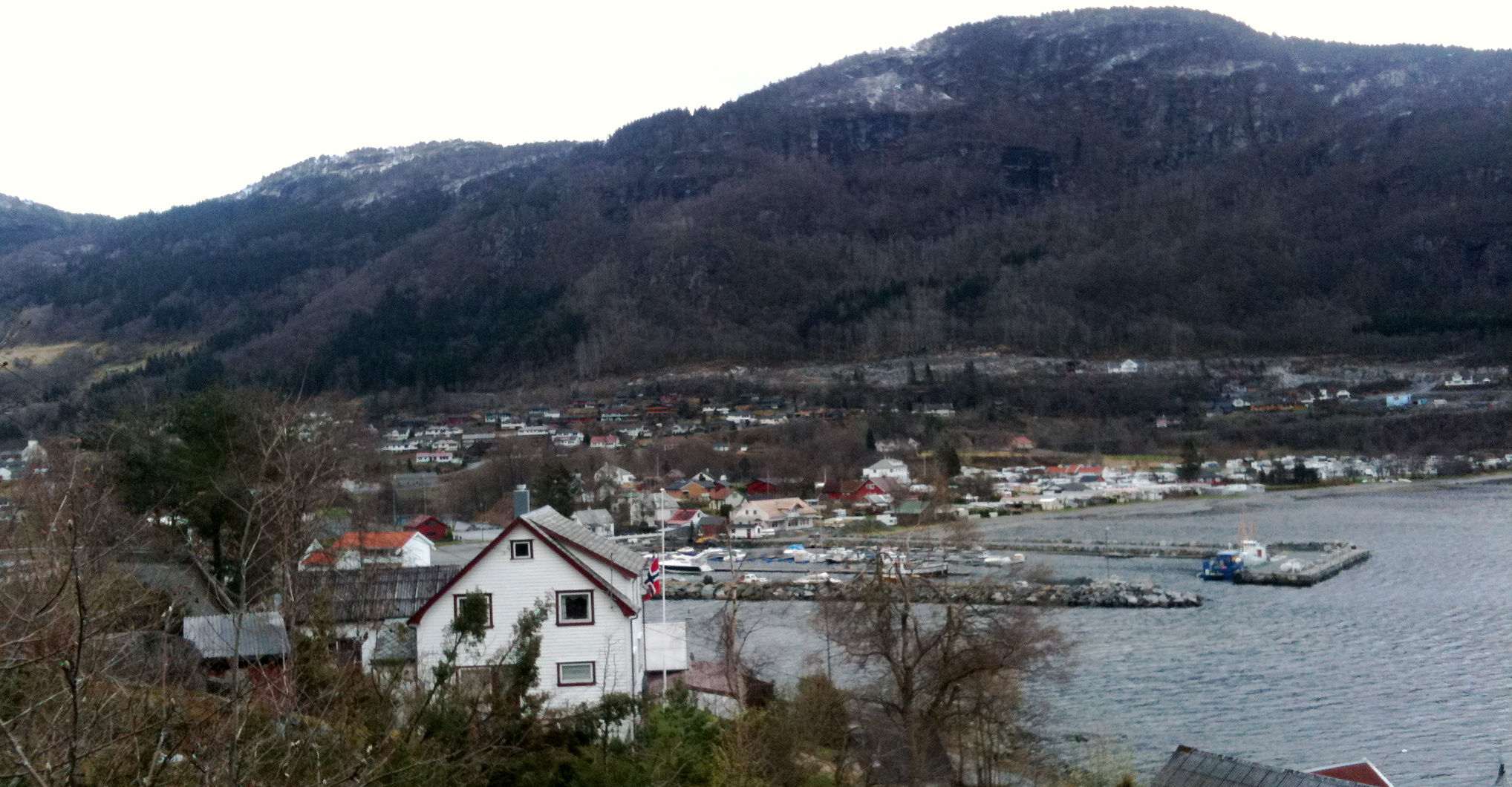
- View of the village
- Interactive map of Vikedal
- Coordinates: 59.49804°N 5.90594°E
- Country: Norway
- Region: Western Norway
- County: Rogaland
- District: Haugaland
- Municipality: Vindafjord Municipality

Area
  - Total: 0.76 km^{2} (0.29 sq mi)
- Elevation: 3 m (9.8 ft)

Population (2025)
  - Total: 518
  - Density: 682/km^{2} (1,770/sq mi)
- Time zone: UTC+01:00 (CET)
  - Summer (DST): UTC+02:00 (CEST)
- Post Code: 5583 Vikedal

Vikedal is a village in Vindafjord Municipality in Rogaland county, Norway. The village is located along the Sandeidfjorden, about 7 kilometres (4.3 mi) south of the village of Sandeid and about 8 kilometres (5.0 mi) northwest of the village of Imslandsjøen. Vikedal Church is located in this village.

The 0.76-square-kilometre (190-acre) village has a population (2025) of 518 and a population density of 682 inhabitants per square kilometre (1,770/sq mi).

== History ==
The village has a long history of boat-building. The village was the administrative center of the old Vikedal Municipality which existed from 1838 until 1965.
