= Imsland Church =

Church in Rogaland, Norway

- Imsland kyrkje
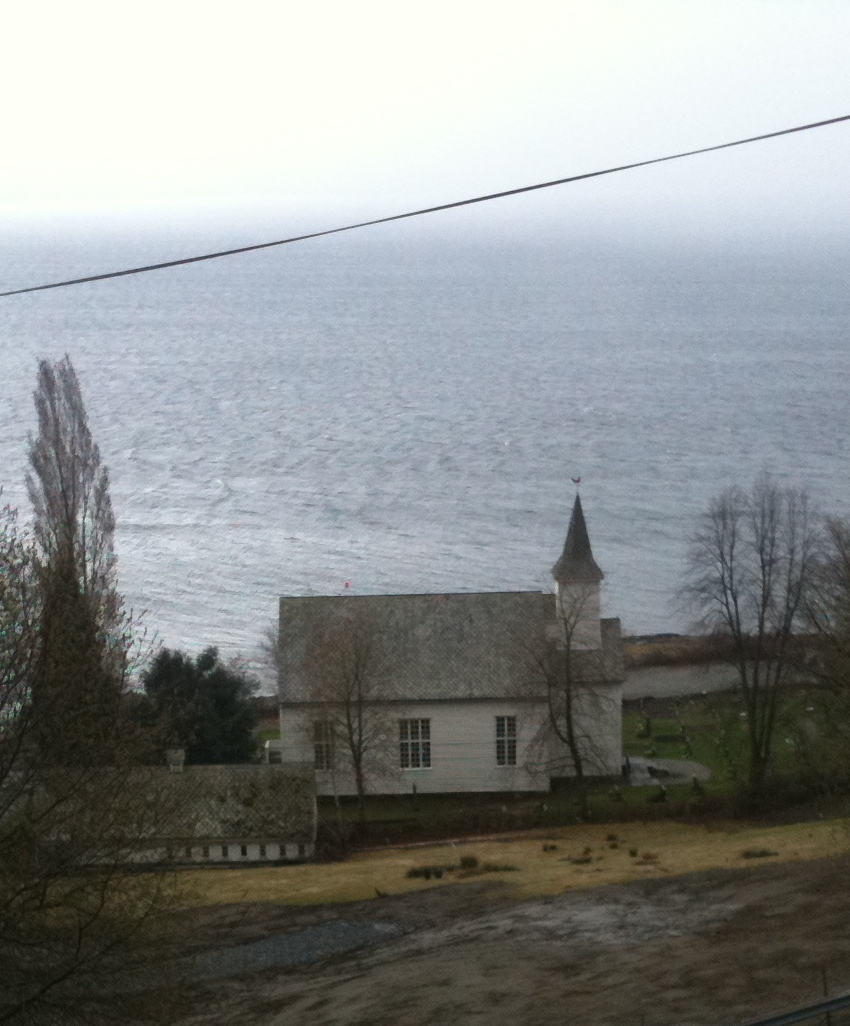
- View of the church
- Imsland Church
- 59.4772°N 5.9887°E
- Location: Vindafjord Municipality, Rogaland
- Country: Norway
- Denomination: Church of Norway
- Churchmanship: Evangelical Lutheran

History
- Status: Parish church
- Founded: Middle Ages
- Consecrated: 1861

Architecture
- Functional status: Active
- Architect: Hans Linstow
- Architectural type: Long church
- Completed: 1861 (165 years ago)

Specifications
- Capacity: 260
- Materials: Wood

Administration
- Diocese: Stavanger bispedømme
- Deanery: Haugaland prosti
- Parish: Imsland
- Norwegian Cultural Heritage Site
- Type: Church
- Status: Protected
- ID: 84715

Imsland Church (Norwegian: Imsland kyrkje) is a parish church of the Church of Norway in Vindafjord Municipality in Rogaland county, Norway. It is located in the village of Imslandsjøen. It is the church for the Imsland parish which is part of the Haugaland prosti (deanery) in the Diocese of Stavanger. The white, wooden church was built in a long church style in 1861 using designs by the architect Hans Linstow. The church seats about 260 people.

== History ==
The earliest existing historical records of the church date back to the year 1620, but it was not new that year. The original church at Imsland was a stave church, located slightly to the southwest of the present church site. In the 1670s, the church had structural problems and started to collapse, so it was torn down and replaced by a small timber-framed church on the same site. In 1861, a new church was built about 7 metres (23 ft) to the northeast of the old church. The following year, the old church was torn down and its materials were sold at auction.

== See also ==
- List of churches in Rogaland
