= Sandeidfjorden =

Fjord in Rogaland, Norway

- Sandeidsfjorden
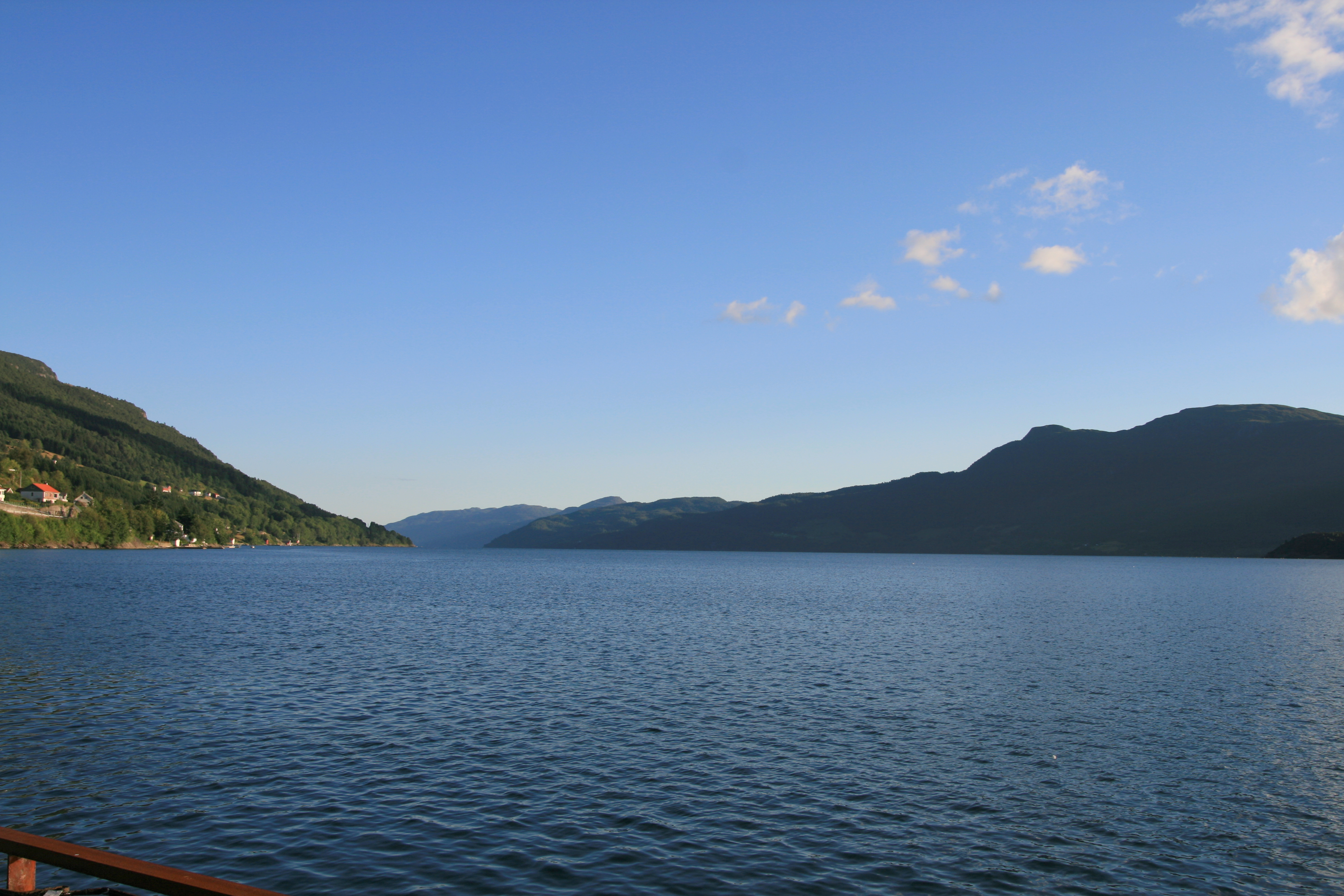
- View of the fjord, from Sandeid
- Interactive map of the fjord
- Location: Rogaland county, Norway
- Coordinates: 59.50891°N 5.85084°E
- Type: Fjord
- Primary outflows: Vindafjorden
- Basin countries: Norway
- Max. length: 9 kilometres (5.6 mi)
- Settlements: Sandeid, Vikedal

Sandeidfjorden (English: Sandeid Fjord) is a fjord in Vindafjord Municipality in Rogaland county, Norway. The 9-kilometre (5.6 mi) long fjord is a northern branch of main Vindafjorden. The village of Sandeid lies at the northern end of the fjord and the village of Vikedal lies on the eastern shore near the mouth of the fjord.

== See also ==
- List of Norwegian fjords
