= Vindafjorden =

Fjord in Rogaland, Norway

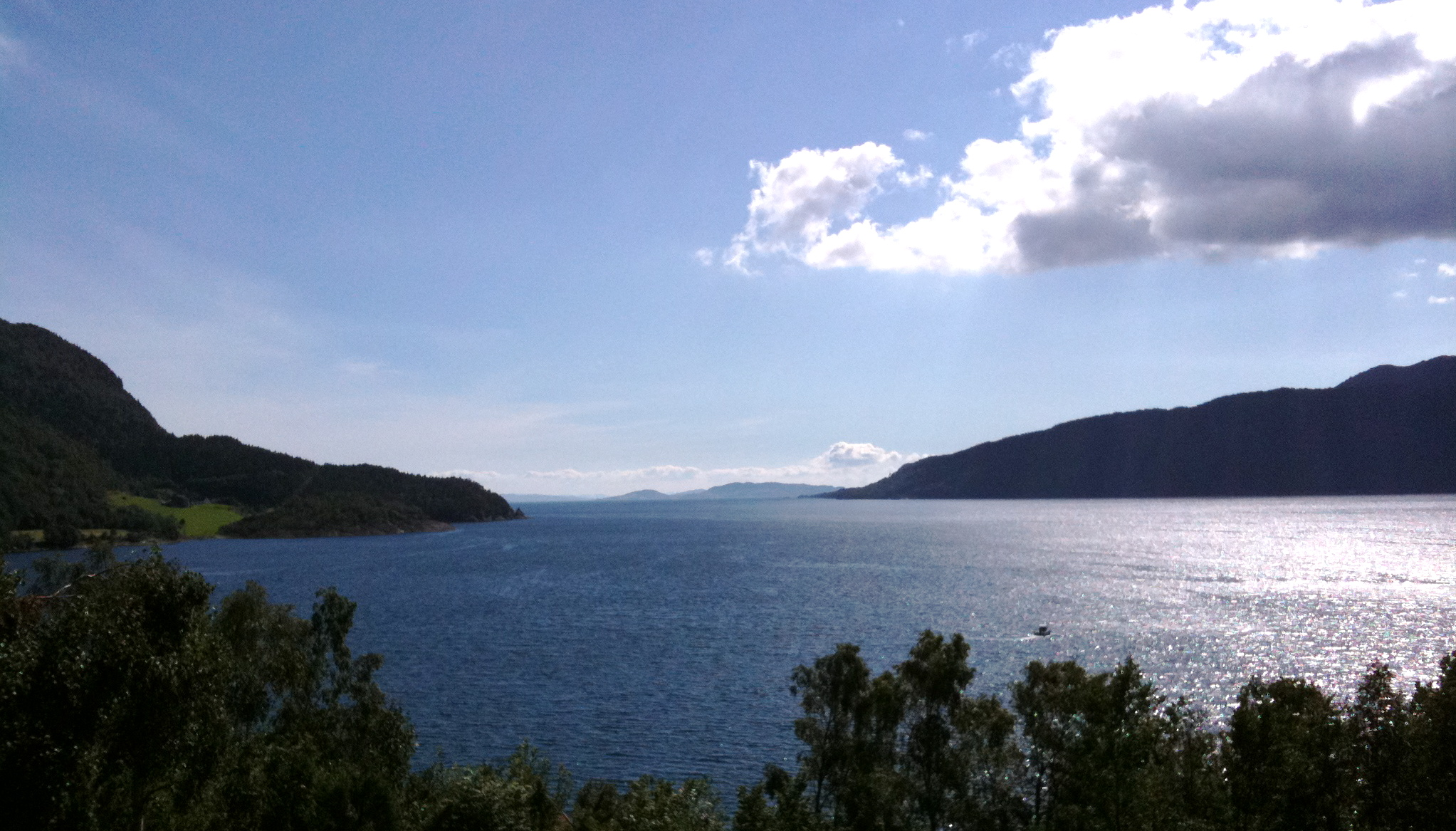
- View of the fjord
- Interactive map of the fjord
- Location: Rogaland county, Norway
- Coordinates: 59.46379°N 5.92749°E
- Type: Fjord
- Primary outflows: Boknafjorden
- Basin countries: Norway
- Max. length: 30 kilometres (19 mi)
- Max. depth: 580 metres (1,900 ft)

Vindafjorden (English: Vinde Fjord or Vinda Fjord) is a fjord in Rogaland county, Norway. The 30-kilometre (19 mi) long fjord is a northern branch off of the main Boknafjorden. The fjord marks the boundaries between Vindafjord Municipality, Suldal Municipality, and Tysvær Municipality.

The fjord initially runs from the very narrow Ropeid isthmus to the west and near the village of Vikadal, the fjord heads to the south before emptying into the Boknafjorden near the village of Nedstrand. There are two smaller fjords which branch off of the Vindafjorden. They are the Sandeidfjorden (to the north) and the Yrkjefjorden (to the west). The deepest part of the fjord reaches about 580 metres (1,900 ft) below sea level, just off the shore from Imsland Church.

== See also ==
- List of Norwegian fjords
