= Ryfylke =

- District
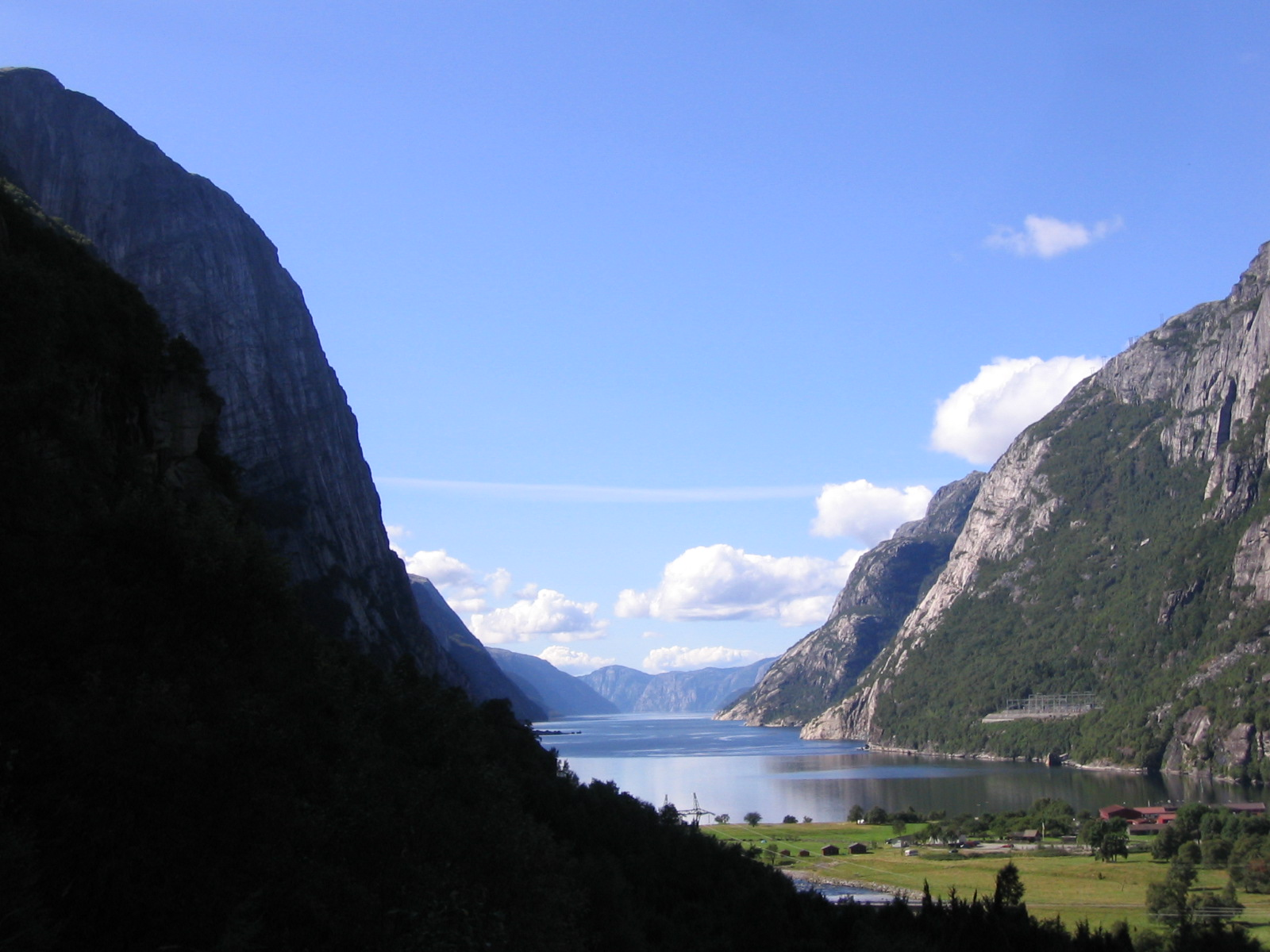
- View of the Lysefjorden

- Ryfylke
- Coordinates: 59.2275°N 6.2472°E
- Country: Norway
- County: Rogaland
- Region: Vestlandet

Area
  - Total: 4,546 km^{2} (1,755 sq mi)

Population (2015)
  - Total: 33,511
  - Density: 7.372/km^{2} (19.09/sq mi)
- Demonym: Ryfylkebu

Ryfylke is a traditional district in the northeastern part of Rogaland county, Norway. The 4,546-square-kilometre (1,755 sq mi) district, encompassing about 60% of the county's area is located northeast of the city of Stavanger and east of the city of Haugesund. It includes the mainland, which is northeast and east of the Boknafjorden and east of the Høgsfjorden. It also consists of the islands on the south side of the Boknafjorden. To the east, Ryfylke borders the districts of Setesdal and Sirdal, to the south is Jæren, and to the west is Haugalandet. Ryfylke is one of the 15 districts in Western Norway.

Ryfylke comprises the contemporary municipalities of Sauda, Suldal, Hjelmeland, Strand, Kvitsøy, the eastern island portion of Stavanger, the eastern part of Sandnes, and the eastern part of Gjesdal. There are no large cities in Ryfylke, but there are two large towns: Sauda and Jørpeland.

Scenic attractions include the Lysefjord with the mountains of Preikestolen ("Pulpit Rock") and Kjerag. The landscape of Ryfylke is characterized by high mountains in the interior; the highest and wildest are located in the north and are formed by hard, igneous rock.

At Haukalivatnet Lake (near Lysefjorden), there is a distinct end moraine presumably created by a prehistoric glacier. This moraine led professor Jens Esmark (in 1824) to formulate the theory of an ice age over Scandinavia and other parts of the world. Esmark believed that climate change due to changes in Earth's orbit caused the ice ages.

== Etymology ==
The Old Norse form of the name was Rygjafylki. The first element is the genitive plural of rygir, which means "person that eats rye", and the last element is fylke, which means "people" and has the same origin as German volk.
