= Ølen Municipality =

Former municipality in Western Norway

Ølen Municipality Ølen kommune
- Former municipality
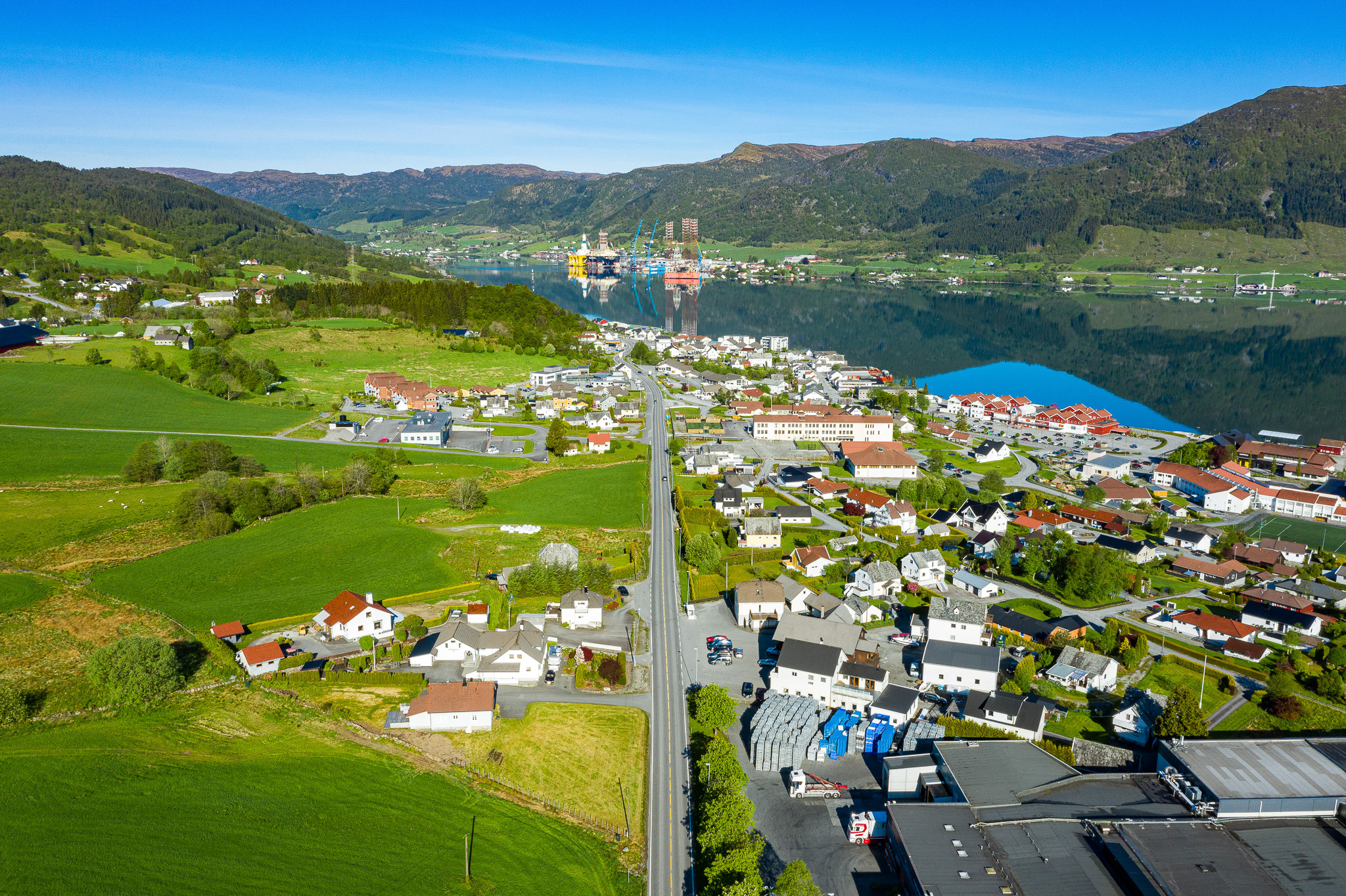
- View over Ølensjøen and Ølensvåg

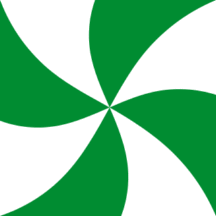
- Flag Coat of arms

- Rogaland within Norway

- Ølen within Rogaland
- Coordinates: 59°38′59″N 05°38′13″E
- Country: Norway
- County: Rogaland
- District: Haugalandet
- Established: 1 Jan 1916
  - Preceded by: Fjelberg Municipality
- Disestablished: 1 Jan 2006
  - Succeeded by: Vindafjord Municipality
- Administrative centre: Ølensjøen

Government
  - Mayor (2004–2005): Arne Bergsvåg (Sp)

Area (upon dissolution)
  - Total: 180.74 km^{2} (69.78 sq mi)
  - Land: 177.8 km^{2} (68.6 sq mi)
  - Water: 2.94 km^{2} (1.14 sq mi) 1.6%
  - Rank: #343 in Norway
- Highest elevation: 740 m (2,430 ft)

Population (2005)
  - Total: 3,420
  - Rank: #250 in Norway
  - Density: 18.9/km^{2} (49/sq mi)
  - Change (10 years): ▲ +6%
- Demonym: Ølsbu

Official language
  - Norwegian form: Nynorsk
- Time zone: UTC+01:00 (CET)
  - Summer (DST): UTC+02:00 (CEST)
- ISO 3166 code: NO-1159

Ølen is a former municipality in Rogaland county, Norway. The 180.74-square-kilometre (69.78 sq mi) municipality existed from 1916 until its dissolution in 2006. The area is now part of Vindafjord Municipality in the traditional district of Haugaland (although it was part of Hordaland county from 1916 until 2002 when it switched counties). The administrative centre was the village of Ølensjøen. Other villages in the municipality included Ølensvåg, Vikebygd, and Bjoa.

Prior to its dissolution in 2006, the 180.74-square-kilometre (69.78 sq mi) municipality was the 343rd largest by area out of the 433 municipalities in Norway. Ølen Municipality was the 250th most populous municipality in Norway with a population of about 3,420. The municipality's population density was 18.9 inhabitants per square kilometre (49/sq mi) and its population had increased by 6% over the previous 10-year period.

== General information ==
Map of Ølen in Hordaland county prior to 2002 when it was transferred to Rogaland county

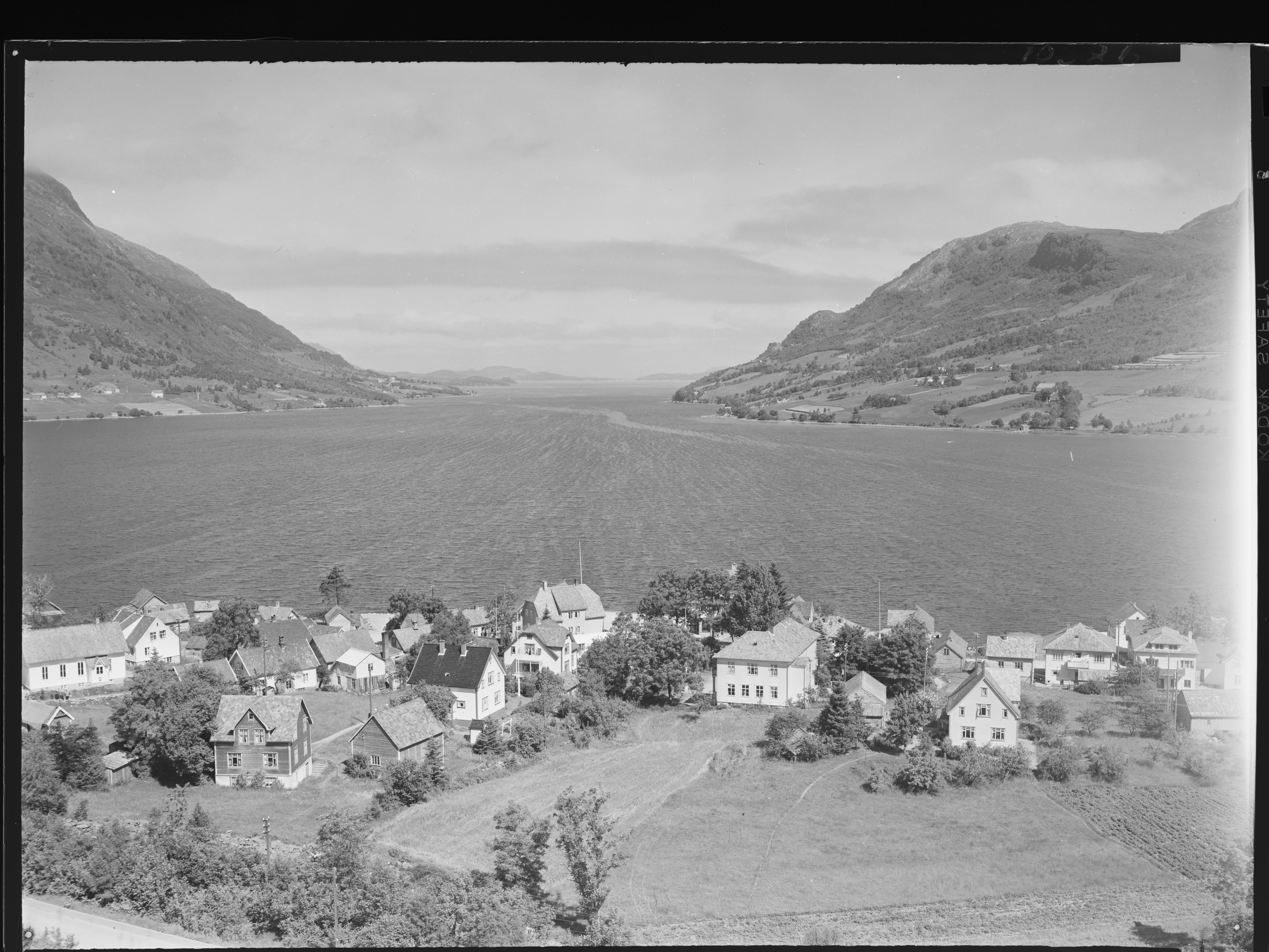
View of Ølen in the first half of the 20th century

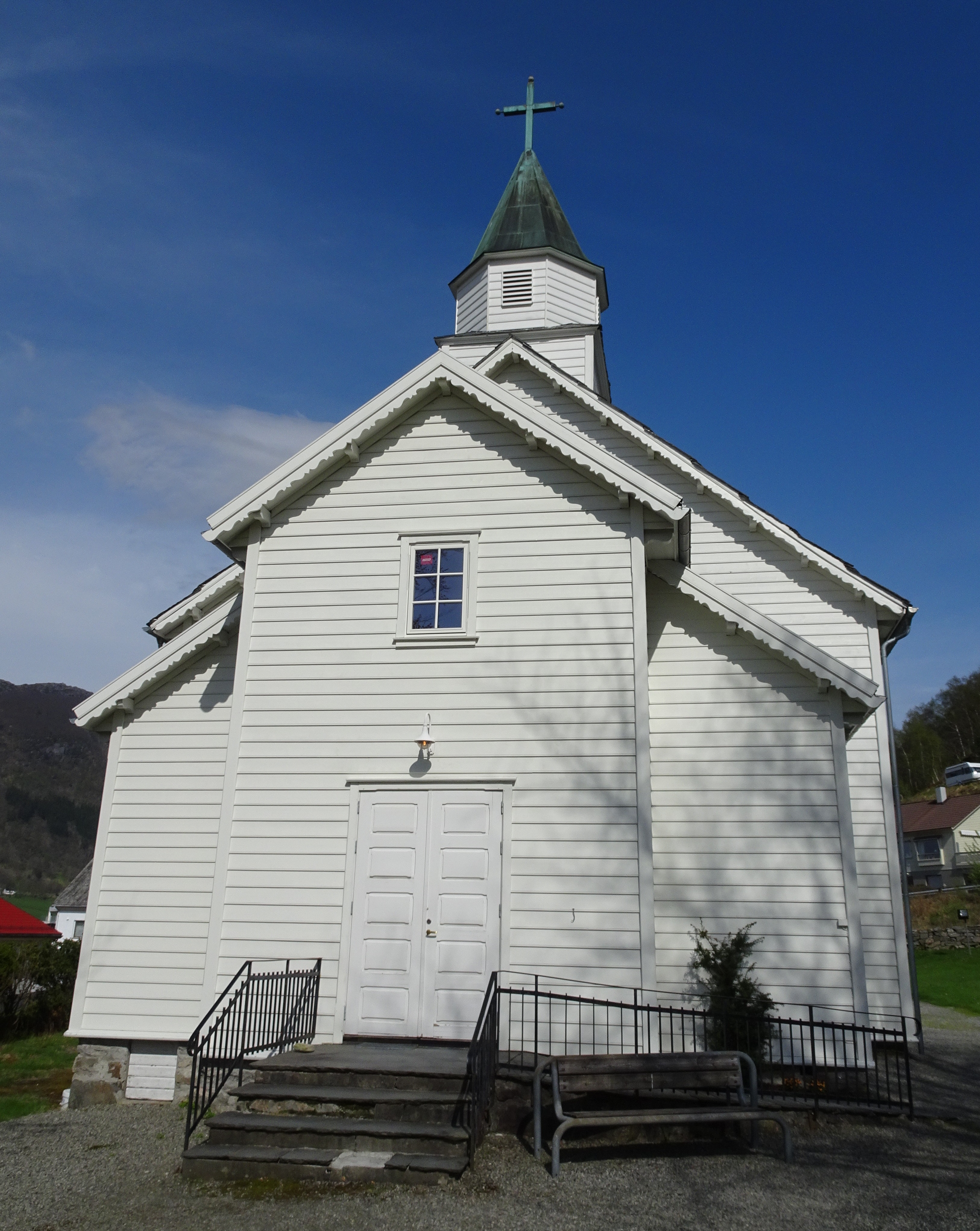
Ølen Church

The parish of Ølen was established as a municipality on 1 July 1916 when the large Fjelberg Municipality was divided as follows:

- the southern mainland areas (population: 1,715) became the new Ølen Municipality
- the northern district (population: 1,926) remained as a smaller Fjelberg Municipality

During the 1960s, there were many municipal mergers across Norway due to the work of the Schei Committee. On 1 January 1964, the neighboring Vikebygd Municipality was dissolved and the eastern half of it (population: 578) was merged into Ølen Municipality.

On 1 January 2002, Ølen Municipality was administratively transferred from Hordaland county to Rogaland county. On 1 January 2003, the people of Ølen Municipality and the neighboring Vindafjord Municipality held a merger referendum which was successful. On 1 January 2006, Ølen Municipality and Vindafjord Municipality merged, forming a new, larger Vindafjord Municipality. Before the merger, Ølen Municipality had a population of 3,426.

=== Name ===
The municipality (originally the parish) is named after the Ølsfjorden (Old Norse: Ǫlund) since it was a central geographical feature of the municipality. The meaning of the name is uncertain, but it may come from the word ala which means "to produce" or "to nourish", possibly referring to the rich fishing in the fjord.

=== Coat of arms ===
The coat of arms was granted on 4 April 1986 and it was in used until 2006 when the municipality was dissolved. The official blazon was "Gyronny embowed argent and vert" (Norwegian: Åttedelt av sølv og grønt ved virvelsnitt). This means the arms are a whirl design that divides the shield into 8 curved sections. The field (background) alternates colors, with half having a tincture of green and the other half have a tincture of argent which means it is commonly colored white, but if it is made out of metal, then silver is used. The design was chosen to symbolise the way that several major roads come together in the municipality, making it an important centre of trade. The arms were designed by Vigdis Viland. The municipal flag has the same design as the coat of arms.

In 2006, the new coat of arms for the new Vindafjord Municipality was designed to combine aspects of the two predecessor municipalities. It bears the design of the old Ølen Municipality coat of arms and the colours of the old Vindafjord Municipality coat of arms.

=== Churches ===
The Church of Norway had three parishes (sokn) within Ølen Municipality. At the time of the municipal dissolution, it was part of the Ølen prestegjeld and the Nordre Ryfylke prosti (deanery) in the Diocese of Stavanger.

Churches in Ølen Municipality
| Parish (sokn) | Church name | Location of the church | Year built |
|---|---|---|---|
| Austre Vikebygd | Vikebygd Church | Vikebygd | 1937 |
| Bjoa | Bjoa Church | Bjoa | 1895 |
| Ølen | Ølen Church | Ølensjøen | 1874 |

== Geography ==
The municipality was located on the mainland south of the Hardangerfjorden, along the shores of the smaller side-fjords: Ålfjorden, Bjoafjorden, and Olsfjorden. The municipality is located along the traditional districts of Sunnhordland (to the north in Hordaland county) and Haugalandet (to the south in Rogaland county). The highest point in the municipality was the 740-metre (2,430 ft) tall mountain Gråhorga. Kvinnherad Municipality was located to the north, Etne Municipality was located to the east, Vindafjord Municipality was located to the south, and Sveio Municipality was located to the west.

== Government ==
While it existed, Ølen Municipality was responsible for primary education (through 10th grade), outpatient health services, senior citizen services, welfare and other social services, zoning, economic development, and municipal roads and utilities. The municipality was governed by a municipal council of directly elected representatives. The mayor was indirectly elected by a vote of the municipal council. The municipality was under the jurisdiction of the Karmsund District Court and the Gulating Court of Appeal.

=== Municipal council ===
The municipal council (Kommunestyre) of Ølen Municipality was made up of 21 representatives that were elected to four year terms. The tables below show the historical composition of the council by political party.

Ølen kommunestyre 2003–2005
| Party name (in Nynorsk) | Number of representatives |
|---|---|
| Labour Party (Arbeidarpartiet) | 3 |
| Progress Party (Framstegspartiet) | 3 |
| Conservative Party (Høgre) | 2 |
| Christian Democratic Party (Kristeleg Folkeparti) | 2 |
| Centre Party (Senterpartiet) | 4 |
| Local list for Utbjoa, Innbjoa, and Haugsgjerdet (Krinsliste for Utbjoa, Innbjoa og Haugsgjerdet) | 4 |
| Vikebygd local list (Vikebygd bygdeliste) | 3 |
| Total number of members: | 21 |
Note: On 1 January 2006, Ølen Municipality became part of Vindafjord Municipality.

Ølen kommunestyre 1999–2003
| Party name (in Nynorsk) | Number of representatives |
|---|---|
| Labour Party (Arbeidarpartiet) | 6 |
| Progress Party (Framstegspartiet) | 1 |
| Conservative Party (Høgre) | 2 |
| Christian Democratic Party (Kristeleg Folkeparti) | 3 |
| Centre Party (Senterpartiet) | 3 |
| Liberal Party (Venstre) | 1 |
| Local list for Utbjoa, Innbjoa, and Haugsgjerdet (Krinsliste for Utbjoa, Innbjoa og Haugsgjerdet) | 2 |
| Vikebygd local list (Vikebygd bygdeliste) | 3 |
| Total number of members: | 21 |

Ølen kommunestyre 1995–1999
| Party name (in Nynorsk) | Number of representatives |
|---|---|
| Labour Party (Arbeidarpartiet) | 2 |
| Conservative Party (Høgre) | 3 |
| Christian Democratic Party (Kristeleg Folkeparti) | 3 |
| Centre Party (Senterpartiet) | 4 |
| Liberal Party (Venstre) | 4 |
| Local list for Utbjoa, Innbjoa, and Haugsgjerdet (Krinsliste for Utbjoa, Innbjoa og Haugsgjerdet) | 2 |
| Vikebygd local list (Vikebygd bygdeliste) | 3 |
| Total number of members: | 21 |

Ølen kommunestyre 1991–1995
| Party name (in Nynorsk) | Number of representatives |
|---|---|
| Labour Party (Arbeidarpartiet) | 3 |
| Progress Party (Framstegspartiet) | 1 |
| Conservative Party (Høgre) | 3 |
| Christian Democratic Party (Kristeleg Folkeparti) | 3 |
| Centre Party (Senterpartiet) | 5 |
| Socialist Left Party (Sosialistisk Venstreparti) | 1 |
| Liberal Party (Venstre) | 1 |
| Local list for Utbjoa, Innbjoa, and Haugsgjerdet (Krinsliste for Utbjoa, Innbjoa og Haugsgjerdet) | 2 |
| Local list for Vikebygd (Bygdeliste for Vikebygd) | 2 |
| Total number of members: | 21 |

Ølen kommunestyre 1987–1991
| Party name (in Nynorsk) | Number of representatives |
|---|---|
| Labour Party (Arbeidarpartiet) | 3 |
| Progress Party (Framstegspartiet) | 1 |
| Conservative Party (Høgre) | 4 |
| Christian Democratic Party (Kristeleg Folkeparti) | 3 |
| Centre Party (Senterpartiet) | 2 |
| Socialist Left Party (Sosialistisk Venstreparti) | 1 |
| Liberal Party (Venstre) | 3 |
| Local list for Bjoa (Krinsliste for Bjoa) | 2 |
| Local list for Vikebygd (Bygdeliste for Vikebygd) | 2 |
| Total number of members: | 21 |

Ølen kommunestyre 1983–1987
| Party name (in Nynorsk) | Number of representatives |
|---|---|
| Labour Party (Arbeidarpartiet) | 3 |
| Progress Party (Framstegspartiet) | 1 |
| Conservative Party (Høgre) | 4 |
| Christian Democratic Party (Kristeleg Folkeparti) | 3 |
| Centre Party (Senterpartiet) | 2 |
| Liberal Party (Venstre) | 4 |
| Local list for Vikebygd, Bjoa, and Haugsgjerdet (Krinsliste for Vikebygd, Bjoa, og Haugsgjerdet) | 4 |
| Total number of members: | 21 |

Ølen kommunestyre 1979–1983
| Party name (in Nynorsk) | Number of representatives |
|---|---|
| Labour Party (Arbeidarpartiet) | 2 |
| Conservative Party (Høgre) | 5 |
| Christian Democratic Party (Kristeleg Folkeparti) | 4 |
| Centre Party (Senterpartiet) | 3 |
| Liberal Party (Venstre) | 2 |
| Local list for Utbjoa, Innbjoa and Haugsgjerdet (Bygdeliste for Utbjoa, Innbjoa og Haugsgjerdet) | 3 |
| Local list for Vikebygd (Krinsliste for Vikebygd) | 2 |
| Total number of members: | 21 |

Ølen kommunestyre 1975–1979
| Party name (in Nynorsk) | Number of representatives |
|---|---|
| Labour Party (Arbeidarpartiet) | 2 |
| Conservative Party (Høgre) | 4 |
| Christian Democratic Party (Kristeleg Folkeparti) | 5 |
| Centre Party (Senterpartiet) | 4 |
| Local list for Utbjoa, Innbjoa and Haugsgjerdet (Bygdeliste for Utbjoa, Innbjoa og Haugsgjerdet) | 3 |
| Local list for Vikebygd (Krinsliste for Vikebygd) | 3 |
| Total number of members: | 21 |

Ølen kommunestyre 1971–1975
| Party name (in Nynorsk) | Number of representatives |
|---|---|
| Labour Party (Arbeidarpartiet) | 3 |
| Conservative Party (Høgre) | 2 |
| Christian Democratic Party (Kristeleg Folkeparti) | 3 |
| Centre Party (Senterpartiet) | 5 |
| Local List(s) (Lokale lister) | 8 |
| Total number of members: | 21 |

Ølen kommunestyre 1967–1971
| Party name (in Nynorsk) | Number of representatives |
|---|---|
| Labour Party (Arbeidarpartiet) | 3 |
| Conservative Party (Høgre) | 2 |
| Christian Democratic Party (Kristeleg Folkeparti) | 3 |
| Centre Party (Senterpartiet) | 3 |
| Liberal Party (Venstre) | 2 |
| Local List(s) (Lokale lister) | 8 |
| Total number of members: | 21 |

Ølen kommunestyre 1963–1967
| Party name (in Nynorsk) | Number of representatives |
|---|---|
| Labour Party (Arbeidarpartiet) | 4 |
| Conservative Party (Høgre) | 1 |
| Christian Democratic Party (Kristeleg Folkeparti) | 4 |
| Joint List(s) of Non-Socialist Parties (Borgarlege Felleslister) | 5 |
| Local List(s) (Lokale lister) | 7 |
| Total number of members: | 21 |

Ølen heradsstyre 1959–1963
| Party name (in Nynorsk) | Number of representatives |
|---|---|
| Labour Party (Arbeidarpartiet) | 4 |
| Conservative Party (Høgre) | 2 |
| Christian Democratic Party (Kristeleg Folkeparti) | 3 |
| Centre Party (Senterpartiet) | 3 |
| Local List(s) (Lokale lister) | 9 |
| Total number of members: | 21 |

Ølen heradsstyre 1955–1959
| Party name (in Nynorsk) | Number of representatives |
|---|---|
| Labour Party (Arbeidarpartiet) | 3 |
| Conservative Party (Høgre) | 3 |
| Local List(s) (Lokale lister) | 15 |
| Total number of members: | 21 |

Ølen heradsstyre 1951–1955
| Party name (in Nynorsk) | Number of representatives |
|---|---|
| Labour Party (Arbeidarpartiet) | 3 |
| Local List(s) (Lokale lister) | 17 |
| Total number of members: | 20 |

Ølen heradsstyre 1947–1951
| Party name (in Nynorsk) | Number of representatives |
|---|---|
| Labour Party (Arbeidarpartiet) | 3 |
| Joint List(s) of Non-Socialist Parties (Borgarlege Felleslister) | 1 |
| Local List(s) (Lokale lister) | 16 |
| Total number of members: | 20 |

Ølen heradsstyre 1945–1947
| Party name (in Nynorsk) | Number of representatives |
|---|---|
| Labour Party (Arbeidarpartiet) | 3 |
| Local List(s) (Lokale lister) | 17 |
| Total number of members: | 20 |

Ølen heradsstyre 1937–1941*
| Party name (in Nynorsk) | Number of representatives |
|---|---|
| Labour Party (Arbeidarpartiet) | 4 |
| Local List(s) (Lokale lister) | 16 |
| Total number of members: | 20 |
Note: Due to the German occupation of Norway during World War II, no elections were held for new municipal councils until after the war ended in 1945.

=== Mayors ===
The mayor (Nynorsk: ordførar) of Ølen Municipality was the political leader of the municipality and the chairperson of the municipal council. The following people have held this position:

- 1916–1919: J.H. Haugland
- 1920–1922: Gunner T. Lunde
- 1923–1925: Jonas Svendsbø
- 1926–1937: Tørris T. Heggen
- 1937–1942: H.J. Haugland
- 1942–1945: Anders Vik
- 1945–1945: H.J. Haugland
- 1946–1955: Thomas Skålnes (V)
- 1955–1959: Johannes Haugland (H)
- 1959–1963: Thomas Haraldsen (LL)
- 1963–1967: Johannes Eikeland (H)
- 1967–1975: Magnus Haugland (Sp)
- 1975–1979: Endre Heggen (H)
- 1979–1999: Dominikus N. Bjordal (V)
- 1999–2005: Arne Bergsvåg (Sp)

== See also ==
- List of former municipalities of Norway
