= Vikebygd (disambiguation) =

Vikebygd may refer to:

== Places ==
- Vikebygd, a village in Vindafjord municipality, Rogaland county, Norway
- Vikebygd Church, a church in Vindafjord municipality, Rogaland county, Norway
- Vikebygd Municipality, a former municipality in the old Hordaland county, Norway
- Vikebygd, Ullensvang, a village in Ullensvang municipality in Vestland county, Norway
