= Olen =

Olen may refer to:

== Places ==
- Olen, Belgium, a municipality in the province of Antwerp, Belgium
- Olen, Russia, a village in Tula Oblast, Russia
- Ølen Municipality, a former municipality in Rogaland county, Norway
- Ølensjøen, or Ølen, a village in Vindafjord Municipality in Rogaland county, Norway
- Ølen Church, a church in Vindafjord Municipality in Rogaland county, Norway
- Olën Park, a stadium in Potchefstroom, South Africa

== People ==
- Olen (poet) (c. 1000 BCE), a Greek poet of legend from Lycia
- Helaine Olen (born mid-1960s), American journalist and author
- Eric Olen (born 1980), American basketball coach
- Lairenjam Olen (born 1973), Indian actor
- Otto L. Olen (1867–1946), American politician from Wisconsin
- Fred Olen Ray (born 1954), American filmmaker
- Frederick Olen Mercer (1901–1966), US federal judge
- Robert Olen Butler (born 1945), American fiction writer
  - Robert Olen Butler Prize, writing prize with winners selected by Butler
- Olen Lovell Burrage (1930–2013), American businessman suspected of three murders
- Olen Steinhauer (born 1970), American fiction writer
- Olen Underwood (born 1942), American football player
- Olen Zellweger (born 2003), Canadian ice hockey player

== See also ==
- Olene, a genus of moths
