= Vikebygd Municipality =

Former municipality in Hordaland, Norway

Vikebygd Municipality Vikebygd herad
- Former municipality
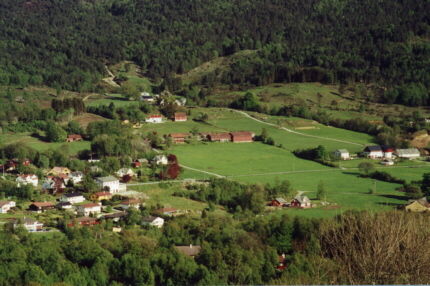
- View of the village of Vikebygd

- Hordaland within Norway

- Vikebygd within Hordaland
- Coordinates: 59°35′39″N 05°35′14″E
- Country: Norway
- County: Hordaland
- District: Sunnhordland
- Established: 1 Jan 1902
  - Preceded by: Sveen Municipality
- Disestablished: 1 Jan 1964
  - Succeeded by: Ølen Municipality and Sveio Municipality
- Administrative centre: Vikebygd

Government
  - Mayor (1959–1963): S. Ludvig Rasmussen (V)

Area (upon dissolution)
  - Total: 101.9 km^{2} (39.3 sq mi)
  - Rank: #518 in Norway
- Highest elevation: 637.5 m (2,092 ft)

Population (1962)
  - Total: 1,075
  - Rank: #602 in Norway
  - Density: 10.5/km^{2} (27/sq mi)
  - Change (10 years): ▼ −7.6%

Official language
  - Norwegian form: Nynorsk
- Time zone: UTC+01:00 (CET)
  - Summer (DST): UTC+02:00 (CEST)
- ISO 3166 code: NO-1215

Vikebygd is a former municipality in the old Hordaland county, Norway. The 101.9-square-kilometre (39.3 sq mi) municipality existed from 1902 until its dissolution in 1964. The area is now divided between Sveio Municipality (in Vestland county) and Vindafjord Municipality (in Rogaland county) in the traditional district of Sunnhordland in Vestland county. The administrative centre was the village of Vikebygd.

Prior to its dissolution in 1964, the 101.9-square-kilometre (39.3 sq mi) municipality was the 518th largest by area out of the 689 municipalities in Norway. Vikebygd Municipality was the 602nd most populous municipality in Norway with a population of about 1,075. The municipality's population density was 10.5 inhabitants per square kilometre (27/sq mi) and its population had decreased by 7.6% over the previous 10-year period.

== General information ==
Historically, the parish of Vikebygd was a part of the old Fjeldberg Municipality. In 1865, Vikebygd parish became a part of the new Sveen Municipality. On 1 January 1902, Sveen Municipality was divided as follows: the eastern part (population: 1,092) became the new Vikebygd Municipality and the western part (population: 1,977) remained as a smaller Sveen Municipality.

During the 1960s, there were many municipal mergers across Norway due to the work of the Schei Committee. On 1 January 1964, Vikebygd Municipality of Vikebygd was dissolved and its lands were divided:

- the areas west of the Ålfjorden (population: 471) became part of the neighboring Sveio Municipality
- the areas east of the Ålfjorden (population: 578) became part of the neighboring Ølen Municipality (on 1 January 2006, all of Ølen Municipality was incorporated into Vindafjord Municipality in Rogaland county)

=== Name ===
The municipality (originally the parish) is named after the old Vik farm (Old Norse: Víkr). The first element is the plural genitive case vík which means "bay" or "cove". The last element was added as a suffix. It comes from the word byggð which means "settlement" or "inhabited area".

=== Churches ===
The Church of Norway had two parishes (sokn) within Vikebygd Municipality. At the time of the municipal dissolution, it was part of the Sveio prestegjeld and the Søndre Sunnhordland prosti (deanery) in the Diocese of Bjørgvin.

Churches in Vikebygd Municipality
Parish (sokn)	Church name	Location of the church	Year built
Austre Vikebygd	Vikebygd Church	Vikebygd	1937
Vestre Vikebygd	Vestre Vikebygd Church	Førde	1938

== Geography ==
It was located along the eastern and western shores of the Ålfjorden, a small branch off the main Hardangerfjorden. The highest point in the municipality was the 637.5-metre (2,092 ft) tall mountain Trollafjellet. Valestrand Municipality was located to the northwest, Ølen Municipality was located to the east, Vats Municipality was located to the southeast, Skjold Municipality was located to the southwest, and Sveio Municipality was located to the west.

== Government ==
While it existed, Vikebygd Municipality was responsible for primary education (through 10th grade), outpatient health services, senior citizen services, welfare and other social services, zoning, economic development, and municipal roads and utilities. The municipality was governed by a municipal council of directly elected representatives. The mayor was indirectly elected by a vote of the municipal council. The municipality was under the jurisdiction of the Sunnhordland District Court and the Gulating Court of Appeal.

=== Municipal council ===
The municipal council (Heradsstyre) of Vikebygd Municipality was made up of 17 representatives that were elected to four year terms. The tables below show the historical composition of the council by political party.

Vikebygd heradsstyre 1959–1963
Party name (in Nynorsk)	Number of representatives
Labour Party (Arbeidarpartiet)	2
Local List(s) (Lokale lister)	15
Total number of members:	17
Note: On 1 January 1964, Vikebygd Municipality was divided between Ølen Municipality and Sveio Municipality.

Vikebygd heradsstyre 1955–1959
Party name (in Nynorsk)	Number of representatives
Labour Party (Arbeidarpartiet)	3
Local List(s) (Lokale lister)	14
Total number of members:	17

Vikebygd heradsstyre 1951–1955
Party name (in Nynorsk)	Number of representatives
Labour Party (Arbeidarpartiet)	2
Local List(s) (Lokale lister)	14
Total number of members:	16

Vikebygd heradsstyre 1947–1951
Party name (in Nynorsk)	Number of representatives
Labour Party (Arbeidarpartiet)	2
Local List(s) (Lokale lister)	14
Total number of members:	16

Vikebygd heradsstyre 1945–1947
Party name (in Nynorsk)	Number of representatives
Labour Party (Arbeidarpartiet)	3
Local List(s) (Lokale lister)	13
Total number of members:	16

Vikebygd heradsstyre 1937–1941*
Party name (in Nynorsk)	Number of representatives
Labour Party (Arbeidarpartiet)	1
Local List(s) (Lokale lister)	15
Total number of members:	16
Note: Due to the German occupation of Norway during World War II, no elections were held for new municipal councils until after the war ended in 1945.

=== Mayors ===
The mayor (Nynorsk: ordførar) of Vikebygd Municipality was the political leader of the municipality and the chairperson of the municipal council. The following people have held this position:

- 1902–1903: Ivar Rodvold
- 1904–1904: A. Alme
- 1905–1916: Jens E. Østvik
- 1917–1922: I. Svendsbø
- 1923–1931: Jens E. Østvik
- 1932–1934: Knut P. Skartland
- 1935–1942: Gunnar J. Røkenes
- 1942–1945: Klaus Meland
- 1945–1946: Gunnar J. Røkenes
- 1946–1955: Hans A. Dommersnes (LL)
- 1955–1959: Øystein Jensen (LL)
- 1959–1963: S. Ludvig Rasmussen (V)

== See also ==
- List of former municipalities of Norway
