= Elleflåt =

Farm in Vindafjord Municipality, Norway

Elleflåt Elleflot
- Village
- Interactive map of Elleflåt
- Coordinates: 59.5251°N 5.66282°E
- Country: Norway
- Region: Western Norway
- County: Vestland
- District: Haugaland
- Municipality: Vindafjord Municipality
- Elevation: 93 m (305 ft)
- Time zone: UTC+01:00 (CET)
  - Summer (DST): UTC+02:00 (CEST)
- Post Code: 5574 Skjold

Elleflåt (or historically Elleflot) is a small farm in Vindafjord Municipality in Rogaland county, Norway. The farm is located along the European route E134 highway about 2 kilometres (1.2 mi) west of the lake Vatsvatnet and about 4 kilometres (2.5 mi) northeast of the village of Skjold.

== History ==
Elleflåt is smaller than the main farms in the Austrheim area, just to the west. In the mid-17th century the farm had no more than four head of cattle, six sheep, and two goats. It is estimated that the farm at that time had about 7 "mål" (a measure of area) of fields, about the same as 7 decares (1.7 acres). In 1723, Elleflot was mentioned as "hard to manage" in historical records.

=== Name ===
A tale says that after the Black Plague a man from Sandeid went up on Mount Blikra. He saw smoke from somewhere west of the lake Vatsvatnet. He followed the smoke to a farm and found a girl who was the only survivor after the plague. The two stayed together, and the farm was known as Elleflot ("Fire-flat": the flat piece of land where the fire had been built by the girl). The tale also claims that the two of them became the predecessors of almost all the people in the Austrheim area (the area between the village of Skjold and the lake Vatsvatnet).
