= Vats, Rogaland =

Village in Vindafjord Municipality, Norway

Vats Vatne
- Village
- Interactive map of Vats
- Coordinates: 59.49148°N 5.72868°E
- Country: Norway
- Region: Western Norway
- County: Rogaland
- District: Haugaland
- Municipality: Vindafjord Municipality
- Elevation: 26 m (85 ft)
- Time zone: UTC+01:00 (CET)
  - Summer (DST): UTC+02:00 (CEST)
- Post Code: 5578 Nedre Vats

Vats is a village in Vindafjord Municipality in Rogaland county, Norway. The village is located in the traditional district of Haugalandet between the southern end of the lake Vatsvatnet and the northern end of the Vatsfjorden. t sits about 10 kilometres (6.2 mi) southwest of the village of Sandeid and about 12 kilometres (7.5 mi) southeast of the village of Skjold. The small Elleflåt farm lies about 5 kilometres (3.1 mi) to the northwest. Vats Church is located in this village.

The village area is an important industrial location. The oil platforms Statfjord, Gullfaks and Troll were all built here. The Norwegian computer and software company Hatteland Group responsible for the AutoStore system is also headquartered in the village.

== History ==
The village was the administrative center of the old Vats Municipality which existed from 1891 until the municipality's dissolution in 1965.
