= Vats Church =

Church in Rogaland, Norway

- Vats kyrkje
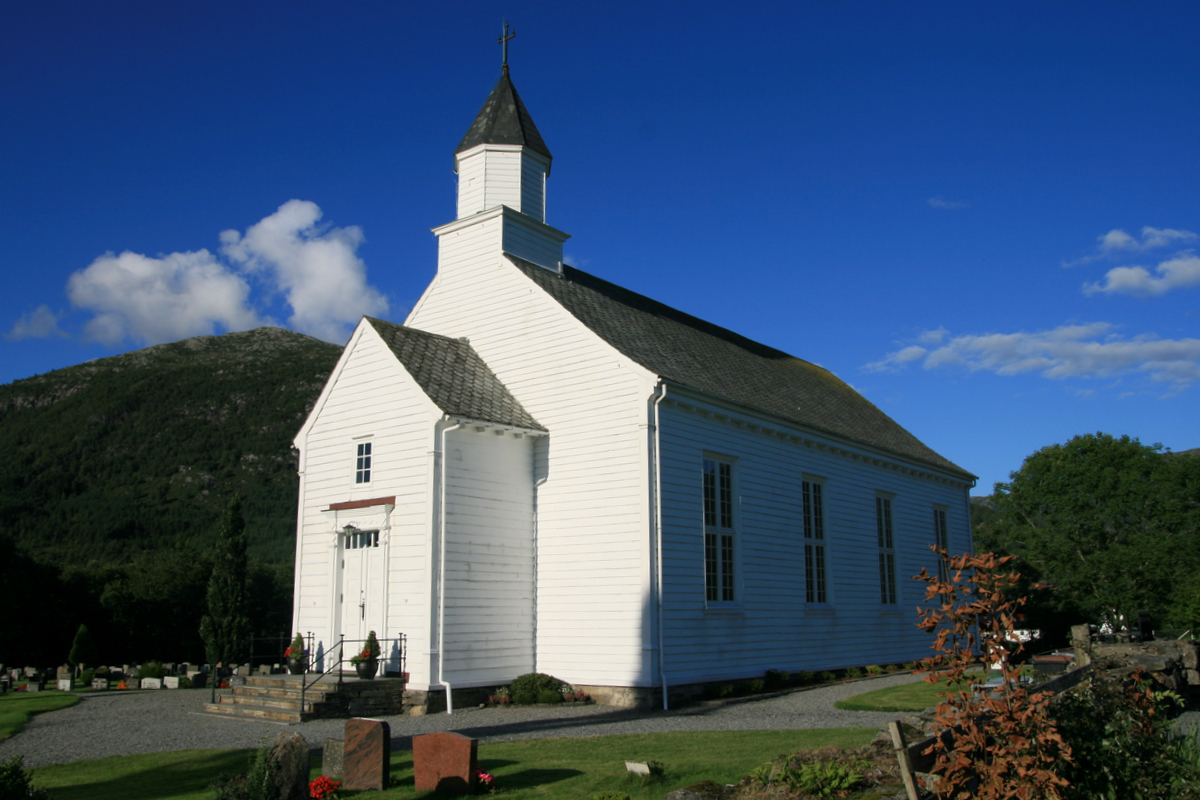
- View of the church (Photo: Jarle Vines)
- Vats Church
- 59.493121°N 5.727891°E
- Location: Vindafjord Municipality, Rogaland
- Country: Norway
- Denomination: Church of Norway
- Churchmanship: Evangelical Lutheran

History
- Status: Parish church
- Founded: 12th century
- Consecrated: 24 Oct 1855

Architecture
- Functional status: Active
- Architect: Hans Linstow
- Architectural type: Long church
- Completed: 1855 (171 years ago)

Specifications
- Capacity: 534
- Materials: Wood

Administration
- Diocese: Stavanger bispedømme
- Deanery: Haugaland prosti
- Parish: Vats
- Norwegian Cultural Heritage Site
- Type: Church
- Status: Protected
- ID: 85784

Vats Church (Norwegian: Vats kyrkje) is a parish church of the Church of Norway in Vindafjord Municipality in Rogaland county, Norway. It is located in the village of Vats at the southern end of the lake Vatsvatnet. It is the church for the Vats parish which is part of the Haugaland prosti (deanery) in the Diocese of Stavanger. The white, wooden church was built in a long church style in 1855 using designs by the architect Hans Linstow. The church seats about 534 people.

== History ==
The earliest existing historical records of the church date back to the year 1319, but the baptismal font is dated back to the 12th century, so the church was likely built around that time. The first church was a stave church located about 8 metres (26 ft) north of the present church. In 1640, the church was renovated and expanded with a new nave being built on the west side of the building and the old nave became the choir and sacristy. (Some sources say that instead of a renovation, the church was torn down and rebuilt on the same site.) In 1855, a new timber-framed church was constructed about 8 metres (26 ft) south of the old building. The new church was consecrated on 24 October 1855. After the new church was completed, the old church was torn down. In 1940, a sacristy was added to the east end of the church.

== See also ==
- List of churches in Rogaland
