= Sandeid Church =

Church in Rogaland, Norway

- Sandeid kyrkje
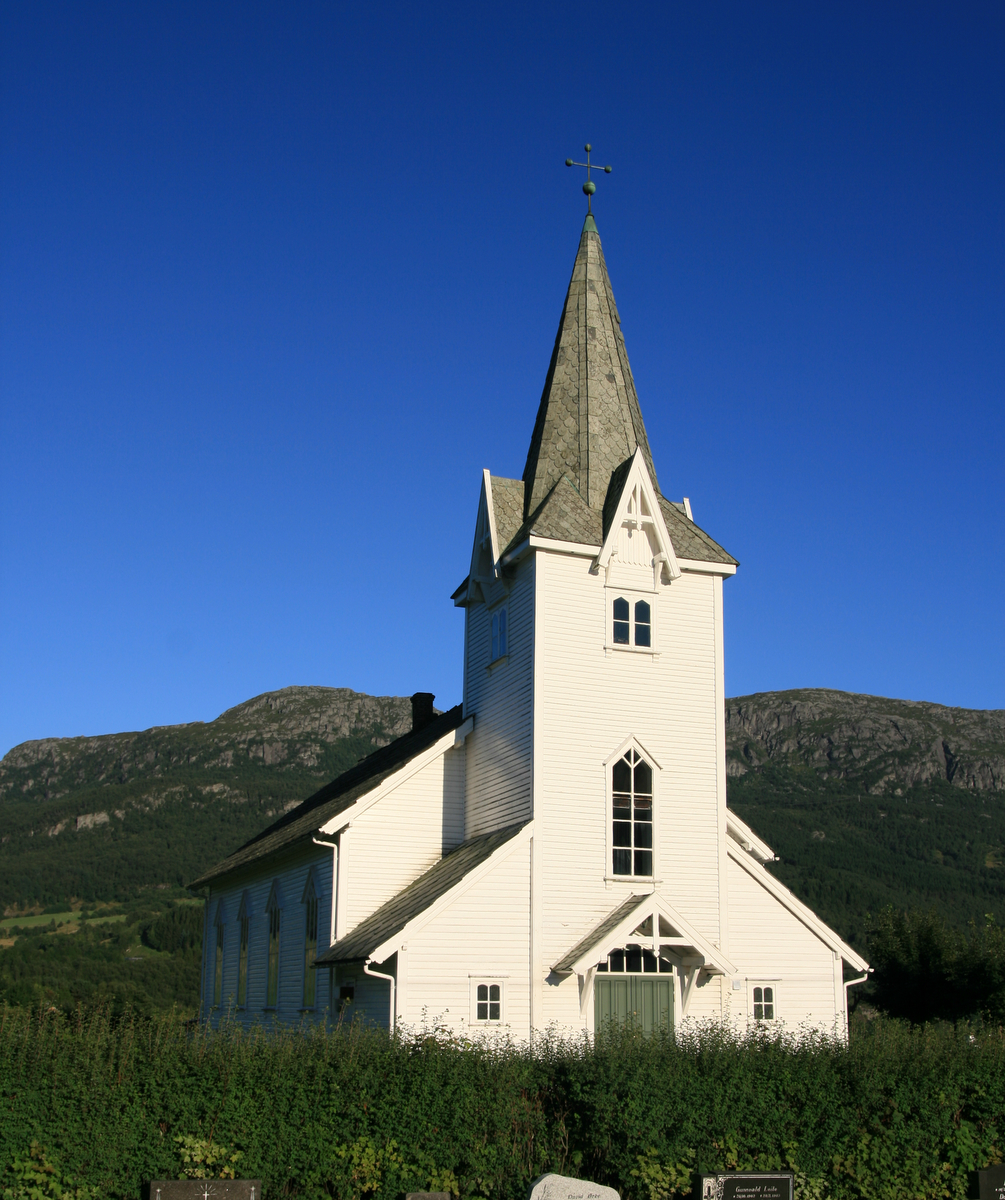
- View of the church (Photo: Jarle Vines)
- Sandeid Church
- 59.546748°N 5.857689°E
- Location: Vindafjord Municipality, Rogaland
- Country: Norway
- Denomination: Church of Norway
- Churchmanship: Evangelical Lutheran

History
- Status: Parish church
- Founded: 12th century
- Consecrated: 1904
- Events: Steeple fire (2017)

Architecture
- Functional status: Active
- Architect(s): Tengesdal and H.S. Eckhoff
- Architectural type: Long church
- Completed: 1904 (122 years ago)

Specifications
- Capacity: 230
- Materials: Wood

Administration
- Diocese: Stavanger bispedømme
- Deanery: Haugaland prosti
- Parish: Sandeid
- Norwegian Cultural Heritage Site
- Type: Church
- Status: Not protected
- ID: 85384

Sandeid Church (Norwegian: Sandeid kyrkje) is a parish church of the Church of Norway in Vindafjord Municipality in Rogaland county, Norway. It is located in the village of Sandeid. It is the church for the Sandeid parish which is part of the Haugaland prosti (deanery) in the Diocese of Stavanger. The white, wooden church was built in a long church style in 1904 using designs by the architects Hartvig Sverdrup Eckhoff and Tengesdal. The church seats about 230 people.

== History ==
The earliest existing historical records of the church date back to the year 1311, but the church was likely built during the 12th century. The medieval stave church was located at Vestbø, along the harbor of today's village of Sandeid. There is a preserved crucifix from the church that dates back to around the year 1200. The stave church was renovated and expanded over the centuries.

In 1628, the choir was replaced with a new timber-framed addition. Eventually the church was in poor condition and in 1814, the church was torn down and replaced with a smaller church with no steeple. In the 1850s, the church was extended to the west so that it could seat more people.

In 1904, a new church building was constructed 400 metres (1,300 ft) to the northwest on a new plot of land that was part of the same farm. After the new church was completed, the old church was closed and in 1906, the old church was torn down. As workers tore down the church, a number of coins were found under the floor that dated back as far as the 1200s.

In the early hours of 5 April 2017 the church's steeple was struck by lightning and caught fire, causing significant damage to the structure before the fire was put out by firefighters.

== Media gallery ==
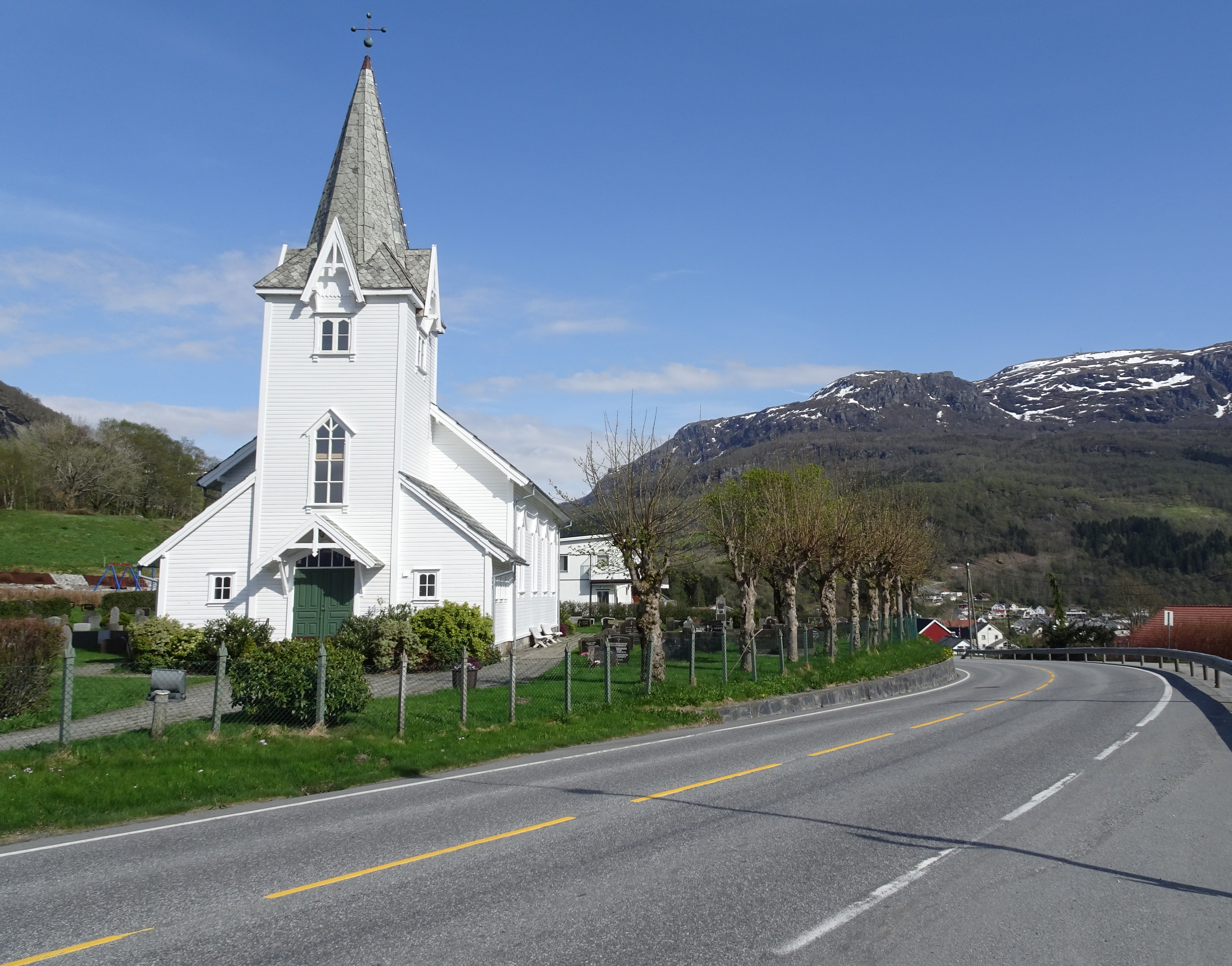
Present church building (since 1907)

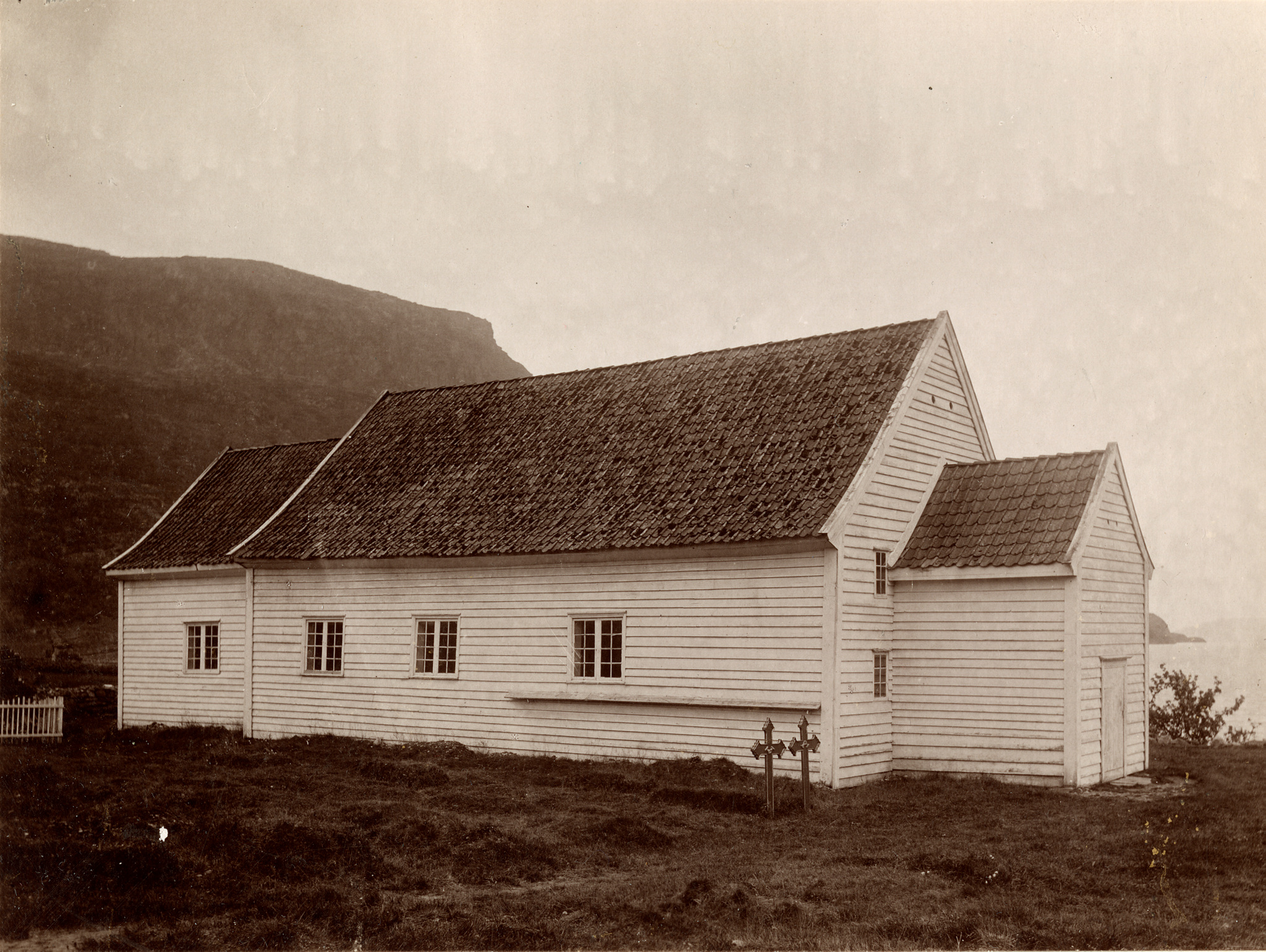
Exterior of the old church (1814-1906)

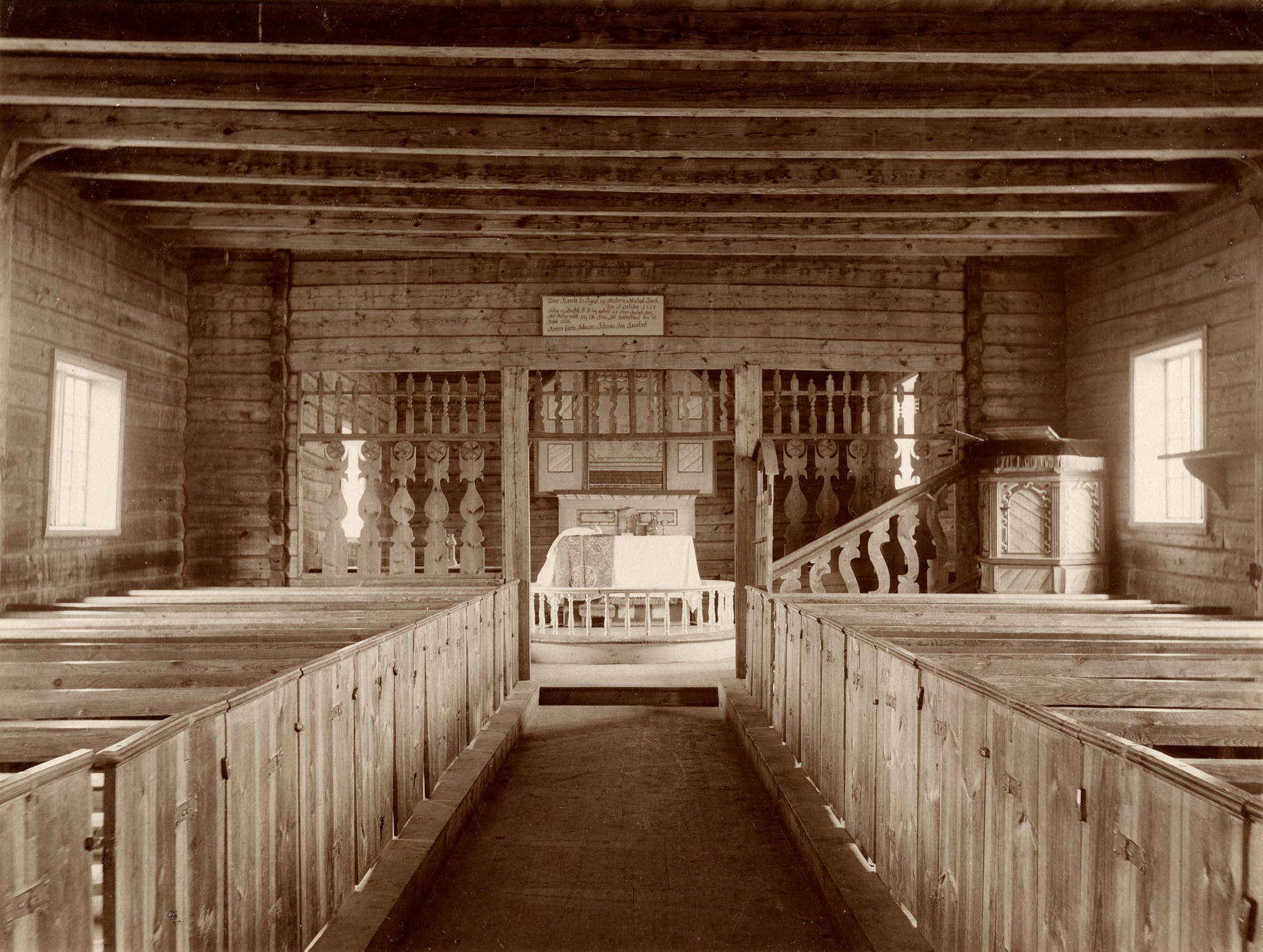
Interior of the old church (1814-1906)

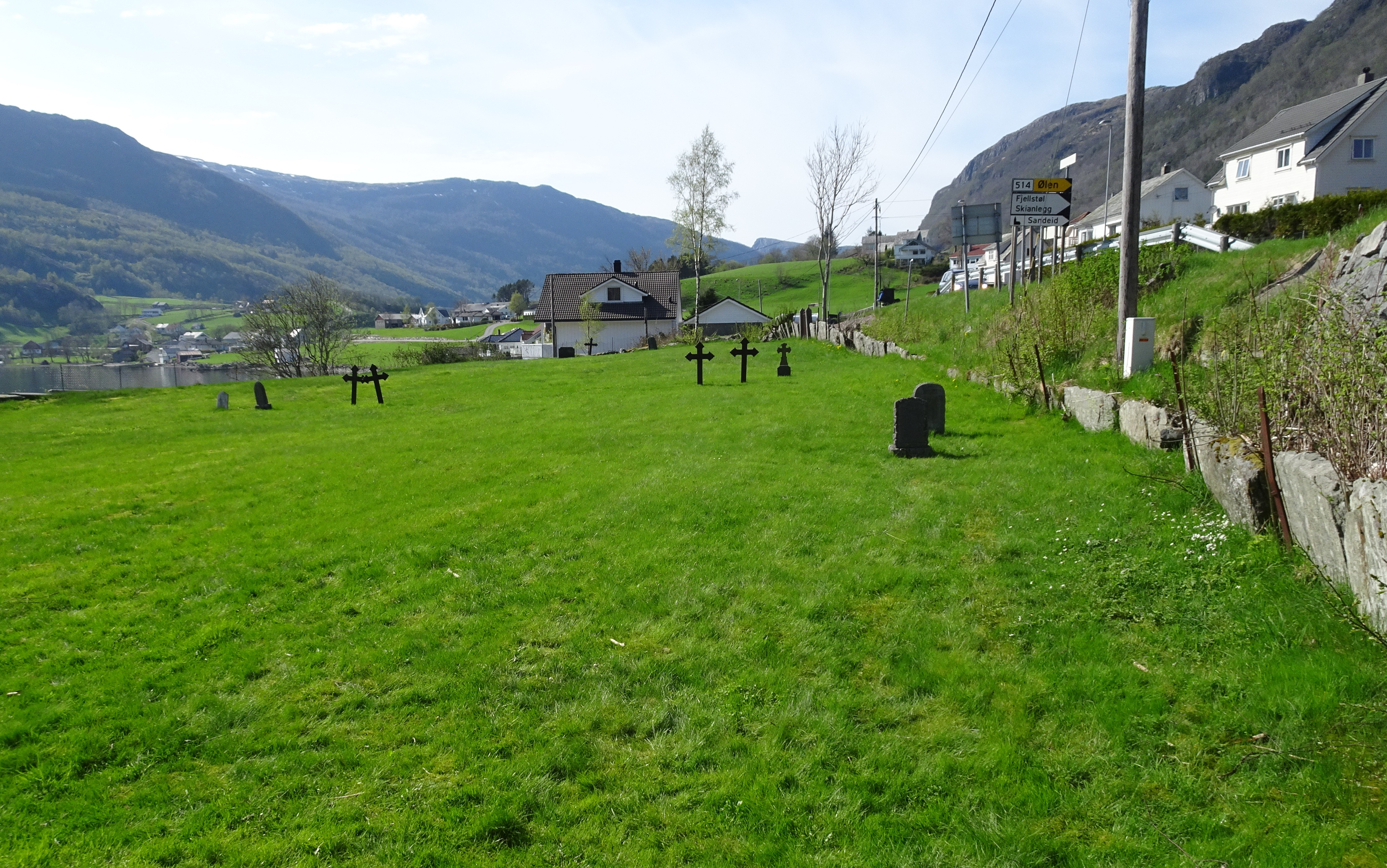
Location where the old church once stood

== See also ==
- List of churches in Rogaland
