= Arne Bergsvåg =

Norwegian politician (born 1958)

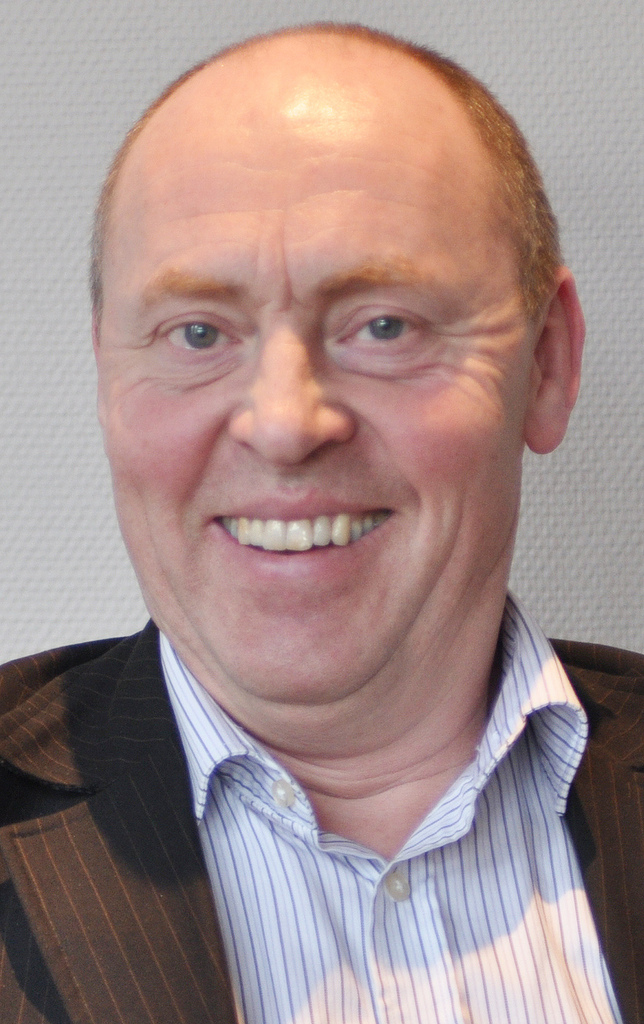

Deputy County Mayor of Rogaland
- In office 22 October 2019 – 24 October 2023
- County Mayor: Marianne Chesak
- Preceded by: Marianne Chesak
- Succeeded by: Svein Erik Indbjo

Mayor of Vindafjord Municipality
- In office 20 September 2005 – October 2011
- Deputy: Marit Hustvedt
- Preceded by: Reidar Havås
- Succeeded by: Ole Johan Vierdal

Mayor of Ølen Municipality
- In office October 1999 – 20 September 2005
- Deputy: Ståle Jordal; Peder Lothe
- Preceded by: Dominikus N. Bjordal
- Succeeded by: Position abolished

Personal details
- Born: 2 February 1958 (age 68)
- Party: Centre
- Spouse: Anne Bergsvåg
- Children: 3

Arne Bergsvåg (born 2 February 1958) is a Norwegian builder and politician for the Centre Party. He served as mayor of Ølen Municipality from 1999 to 2005 and then mayor of Vindafjord Municipality between 2005 and 2011. He later served as deputy county mayor of Rogaland between 2019 and 2023, and was also a deputy member of parliament for Rogaland between 2005 and 2013 and again from 2017 to 2021.

== Political career ==
=== Parliament ===
He served as a deputy representative to the Storting from Rogaland between 2005 and 2013 and was re-elected at the 2009 election. During his time in parliament, he sat for a total of 132 days of session. He was later re-elected at the 2017 election and sat until 2021.

=== Local politics ===
On the local level, Bergsvåg became mayor of Ølen Municipality in 1999. When it was incorporated into Vindafjord Municipality in 2005, Bergsvåg became the new mayor of that municipality. He declined to stand for another term as mayor in the 2011 local elections.

He was a member of the Rogaland county council between 2003 and 2023 and he had the top spot on the Rogaland Centre Party's list for the election to the county council in 2011. He also served as the deputy county mayor of Rogaland between 2019 and 2023. He was succeeded by Svein Erik Indbjo.

== Personal life ==
He is married to Anne Bergsvåg, with whom has three children and a further six grandchildren. He is also a builder by education.
