= Bjoa =

Village in Vindafjord Municipality, Norway

- Village
- Interactive map of Bjoa
- Coordinates: 59.66453°N 5.64305°E
- Country: Norway
- Region: Western Norway
- County: Rogaland
- District: Haugaland
- Municipality: Vindafjord Municipality
- Elevation: 49 m (161 ft)
- Time zone: UTC+01:00 (CET)
  - Summer (DST): UTC+02:00 (CEST)
- Post Code: 5584 Bjoa

Bjoa is a village in Vindafjord Municipality in Rogaland county, Norway. The village is located along the coast of the Bjoafjorden, just across the fjord from the island of Borgundøya. The village has a kindergarten and an elementary school, serving the northern portion of Vindafjord Municipality.

Bjoa is the site of a large blueberry farm as well as several companies such as Tveit Maskin AS and T.Sandsgård Anlegg AS. The headquarters of Granberg AS is also located in Innbjoa. Granberg is the biggest import company in Norway for Gloves. Bjoa Church is also located in the village.

Gråhorga is the tallest mountain in the area, measuring at 740 metres (2,430 ft) above sea level. Another smaller mountain near Bjoa is Steinslandsåta, a small hill measuring 249 metres (817 ft) above sea level.
