= Bjoa Church =

Church in Rogaland, Norway

- Bjoa kyrkje
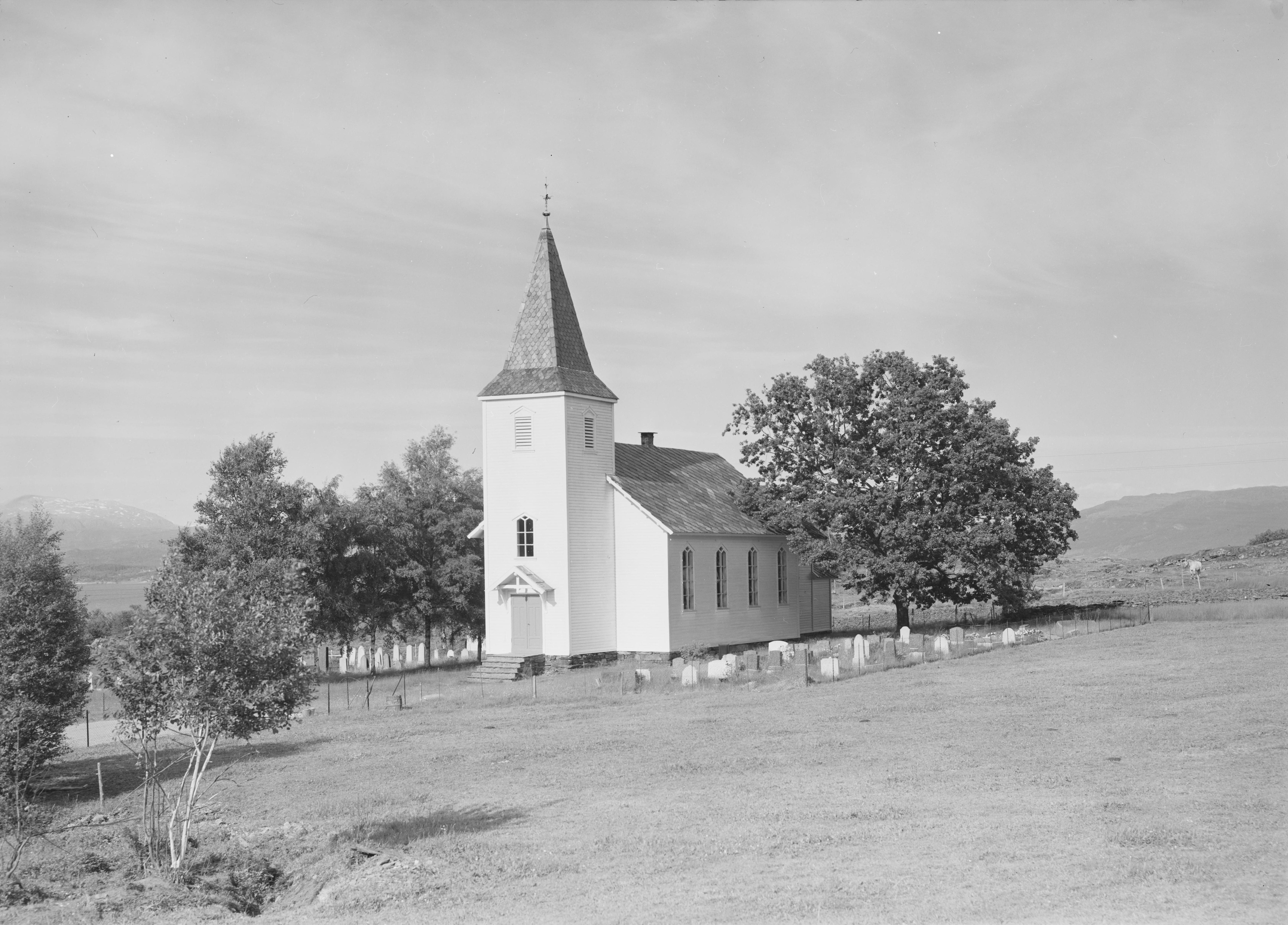
- View of the church
- Bjoa Church
- 59.664950°N 5.644399°E
- Location: Vindafjord Municipality, Rogaland
- Country: Norway
- Denomination: Church of Norway
- Churchmanship: Evangelical Lutheran

History
- Status: Parish church
- Founded: Middle Ages
- Consecrated: 1895

Architecture
- Functional status: Active
- Architect: Hartvig Sverdrup Eckhoff
- Architectural type: Long church
- Style: Neo-Gothic
- Completed: 1895 (131 years ago)

Specifications
- Capacity: 250
- Materials: Wood

Administration
- Diocese: Stavanger bispedømme
- Deanery: Haugaland prosti
- Parish: Ølen og Bjoa
- Norwegian Cultural Heritage Site
- Type: Church
- Status: Not protected
- ID: 83898

Bjoa Church (Norwegian: Bjoa kyrkje) is a parish church of the Church of Norway in Vindafjord Municipality in Rogaland county, Norway. It is located in the village of Bjoa. It is one of the two churches for the Ølen og Bjoa parish which is part of the Haugaland prosti (deanery) in the Diocese of Stavanger. The white, wooden church was built in a long church design and in a neo-Gothic style in 1895 using designs by the architect Hartvig Sverdrup Eckhoff. The church seats about 250 people.

== History ==
The earliest existing historical records of the church date back to the 1300s. The location of the medieval church is somewhat unclear. According to local traditions as well as recent studies, there are several possible locations for the church at Bjoa:

- One site is located on the farm known as Innbjoa 10, about 200 metres (660 ft) east of the present location of the church where there was a 12-metre (39 ft) long remnant of a foundation wall with a right-angled end. According to legend, there was a monastery or church located at that site.
- Another possible location is on the farm known as Innbjoa 4, about 150 metres (490 ft) southeast of the church. A local man born 1890 was the source of this information.
- Some historical records refer to the church at Bjoa and it makes it seem like the church was located on the same site as the present church.

Regardless of where the church was located, in 1895, a new church was constructed on the present site and the old church was torn down.

== See also ==
- List of churches in Rogaland
