= Ølensvåg =

Village in Vindafjord Municipality, Norway

Ølensvåg Ølsvågen
- Village
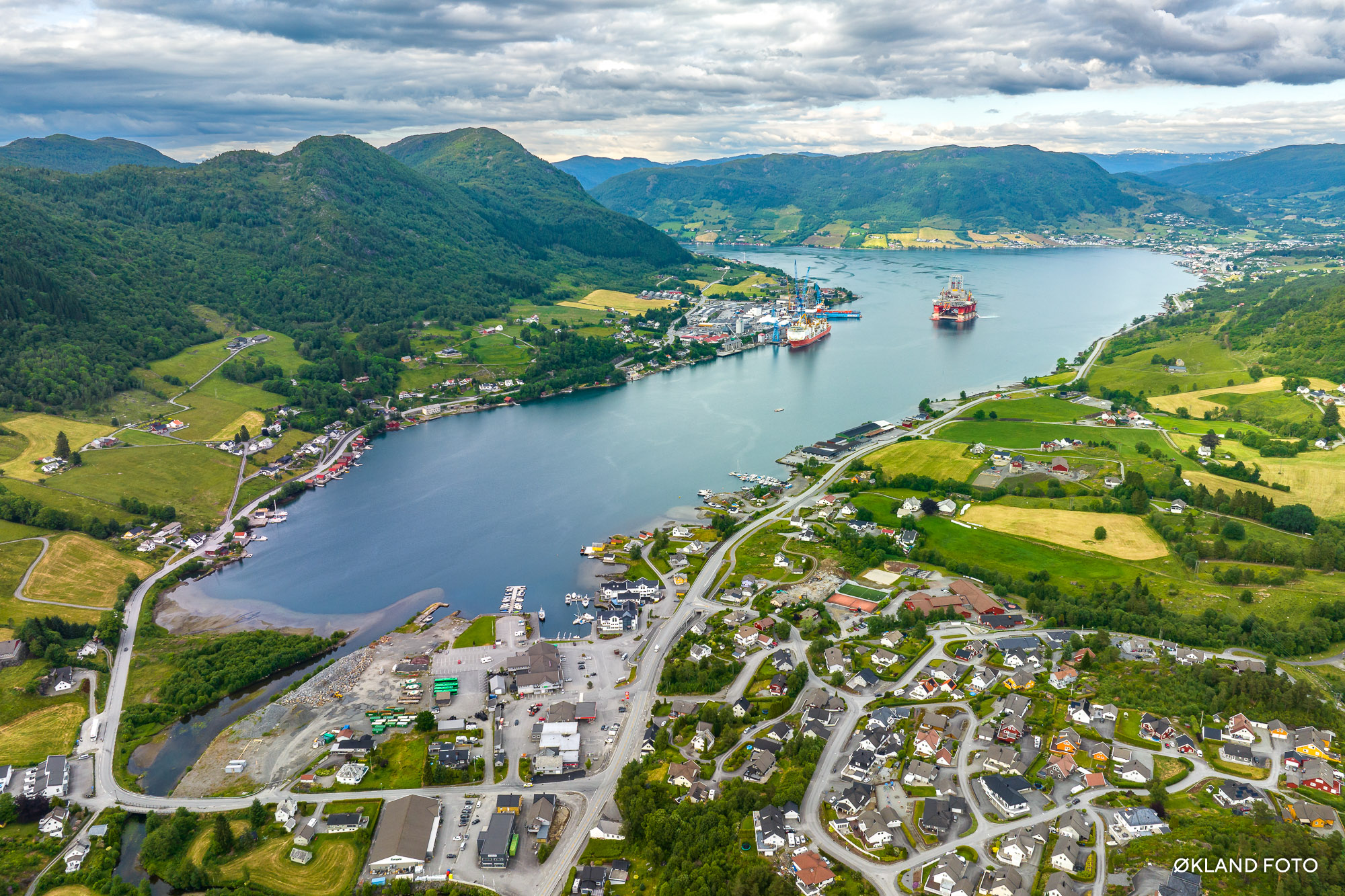
- View of the village
- Interactive map of Ølensvåg
- Coordinates: 59.59649°N 5.74239°E
- Country: Norway
- Region: Western Norway
- County: Vestland
- District: Haugaland
- Municipality: Vindafjord Municipality

Area
  - Total: 0.41 km^{2} (0.16 sq mi)
- Elevation: 4 m (13 ft)

Population (2025)
  - Total: 487
  - Density: 1,188/km^{2} (3,080/sq mi)
- Time zone: UTC+01:00 (CET)
  - Summer (DST): UTC+02:00 (CEST)
- Post Code: 5582 Ølensvåg

Ølensvåg is a village in Vindafjord Municipality in Rogaland county, Norway. The village is located at the southwestern end of the Ølsfjorden, along the European route E134 highway, just west of the municipal centre of Ølensjøen.

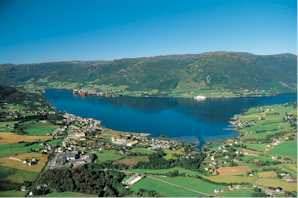
View of Ølensvåg at the left end of the fjord and Ølen in the front centre of the photo.

The 0.41-square-kilometre (100-acre) village has a population (2025) of 487 and a population density of 1,188 inhabitants per square kilometre (3,080/sq mi).

== History ==
The village was historically a part of the old Ølen Municipality, which was merged into Vindafjord Municipality in 2006.
