= Ølensjøen =

Village in Vindafjord Municipality, Norway

Ølen Ølensjøen
- Village
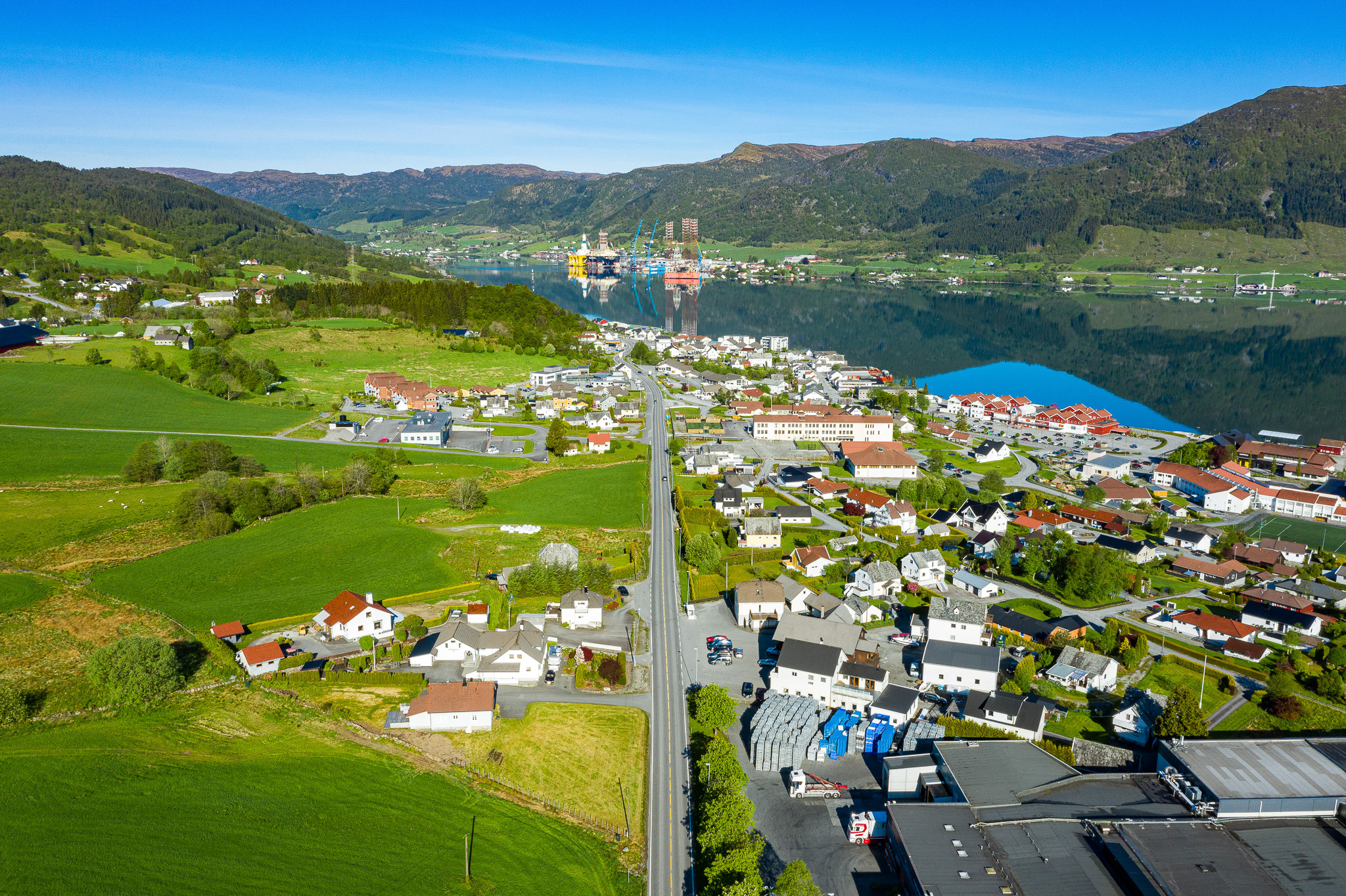
- View of the village Ølen in 2019
- Interactive map of the village
- Coordinates: 59.60421°N 5.8079°E
- Country: Norway
- Region: Western Norway
- County: Vestland
- District: Haugaland
- Municipality: Vindafjord Municipality

Area
  - Total: 1.11 km^{2} (0.43 sq mi)
- Elevation: 14 m (46 ft)

Population (2025)
  - Total: 1,410
  - Density: 1,270/km^{2} (3,300/sq mi)
- Time zone: UTC+01:00 (CET)
  - Summer (DST): UTC+02:00 (CEST)
- Post Code: 5580 Ølen

Ølensjøen or Ølen is the administrative centre of Vindafjord Municipality in Rogaland county, Norway. The village is located at the southern end of the Ølsfjorden, along the European route E134 highway, just east of the village of Ølensvåg.

The 1.11-square-kilometre (270-acre) village has a population (2025) of 1,410 and a population density of 1,270 inhabitants per square kilometre (3,300/sq mi). It is the largest urban area in the municipality.

Ølensjøen is the regional center for commerce for the inner part of the Haugaland area. It has a secondary school, sports club, and a public swimming pool. Norway's largest privately owned slaughterhouse, Fatland slakteri, is located in Ølensjøen. There is a large shopping center with a pharmacy and post office in Ølensjøen that serves the residents of the Etne-Vindafjord area. Ølen Church is also located in this village.

== History ==
Prior to 2006, Ølensjøen was the administrative centre of the old Ølen Municipality. In 2006, Ølen Municipality was merged with Vindafjord Municipality, and the administration of the new, larger Vindafjord Municipality was moved to the village of Ølensjøen.
