= Vikebygd =

- Village
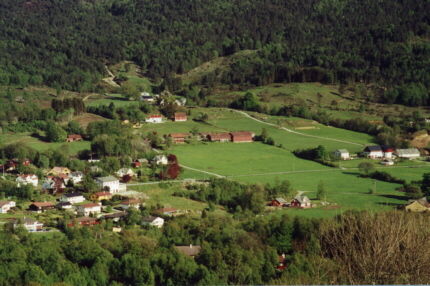
- View of the village
- Interactive map of Vikebygd
- Coordinates: 59.59442°N 5.58749°E
- Country: Norway
- Region: Western Norway
- County: Rogaland
- District: Haugalandet
- Municipality: Vindafjord Municipality
- Elevation: 6 m (20 ft)
- Time zone: UTC+01:00 (CET)
  - Summer (DST): UTC+02:00 (CEST)
- Post Code: 5568 Vikebygd

Vikebygd is a village in Vindafjord Municipality in Rogaland county, Norway. The village is located along the Ålfjorden, about 9 kilometres (5.6 mi) straight west of the village of Ølensvåg. The village was the administrative centre of the old Vikebygd Municipality which existed from 1902 until 1964. Vikebygd is the site of Vikebygd Church. The village is a mostly agricultural area, although many residents commute to the nearby city of Haugesund, about 40 kilometres (25 mi) to the southwest.

== Media gallery ==
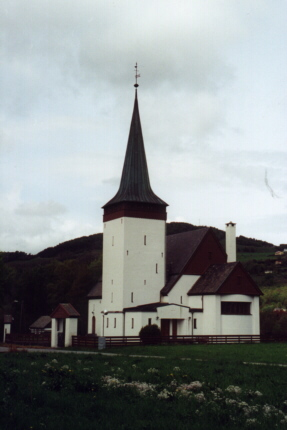
View of Vikebygd Church

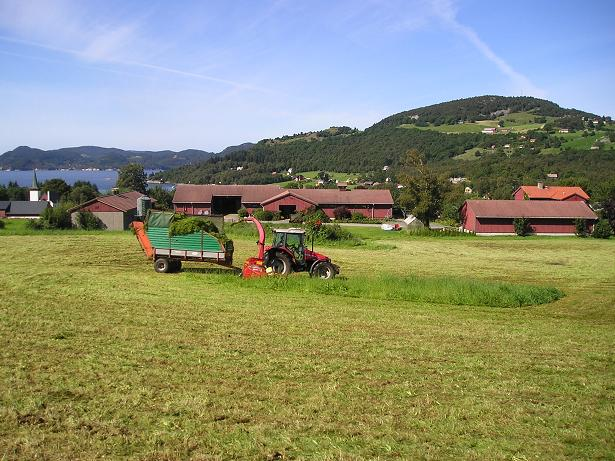
Local farm area in Vikebygd
