= Ølen Church =

Church in Rogaland, Norway

- Ølen kyrkje
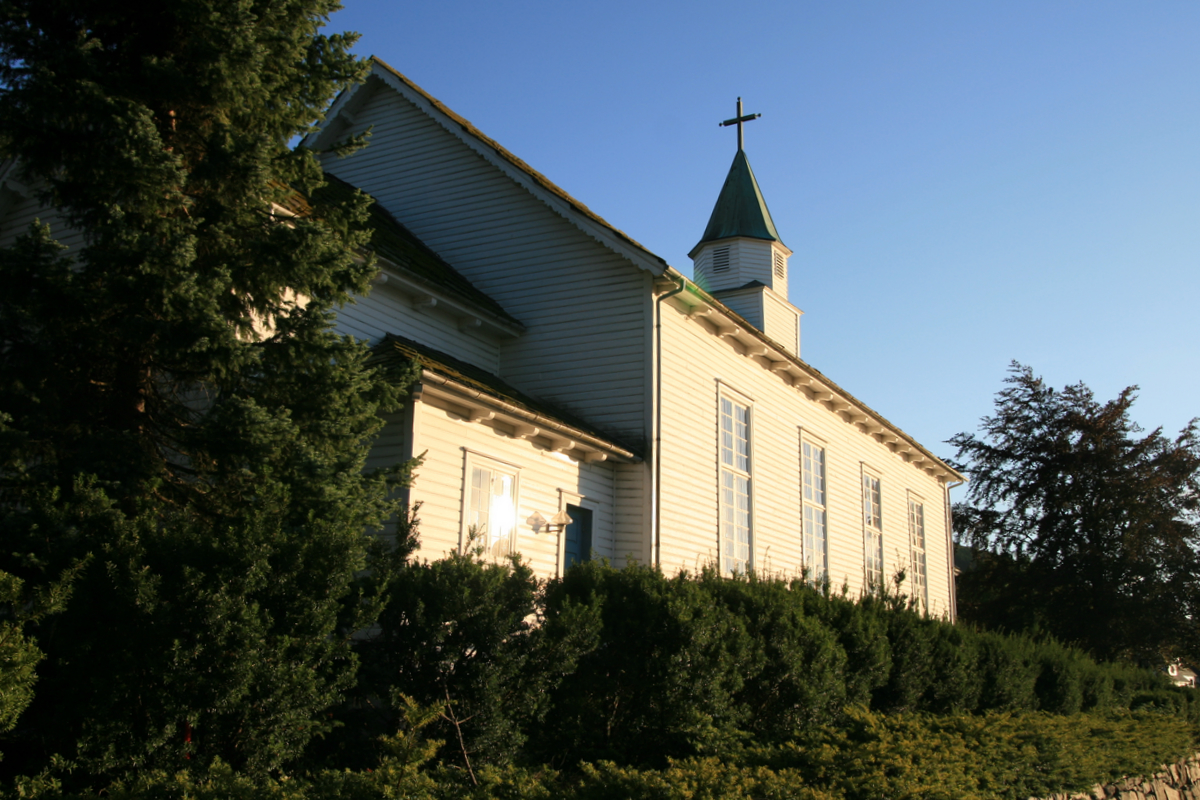
- View of the church
- Ølen Church
- 59.603674°N 5.801933°E
- Location: Vindafjord Municipality, Rogaland
- Country: Norway
- Denomination: Church of Norway
- Churchmanship: Evangelical Lutheran

History
- Status: Parish church
- Founded: 13th century
- Consecrated: 20 Nov 1874

Architecture
- Functional status: Active
- Architect: T. Solheim
- Architectural type: Long church
- Completed: 1874 (152 years ago)

Specifications
- Capacity: 550
- Materials: Wood

Administration
- Diocese: Stavanger bispedømme
- Deanery: Haugaland prosti
- Parish: Ølen og Bjoa
- Norwegian Cultural Heritage Site
- Type: Church
- Status: Not protected
- ID: 85902

Ølen Church (Norwegian: Ølen kyrkje) is a parish church of the Church of Norway in Vindafjord Municipality in Rogaland county, Norway. It is located in the village of Ølensjøen. It is one of the two churches for the Ølen og Bjoa parish which is part of the Haugaland prosti (deanery) in the Diocese of Stavanger. The white, wooden church was built in a long church style in 1874 using designs by the architect T. Solheim. The church seats about 550 people.

== History ==
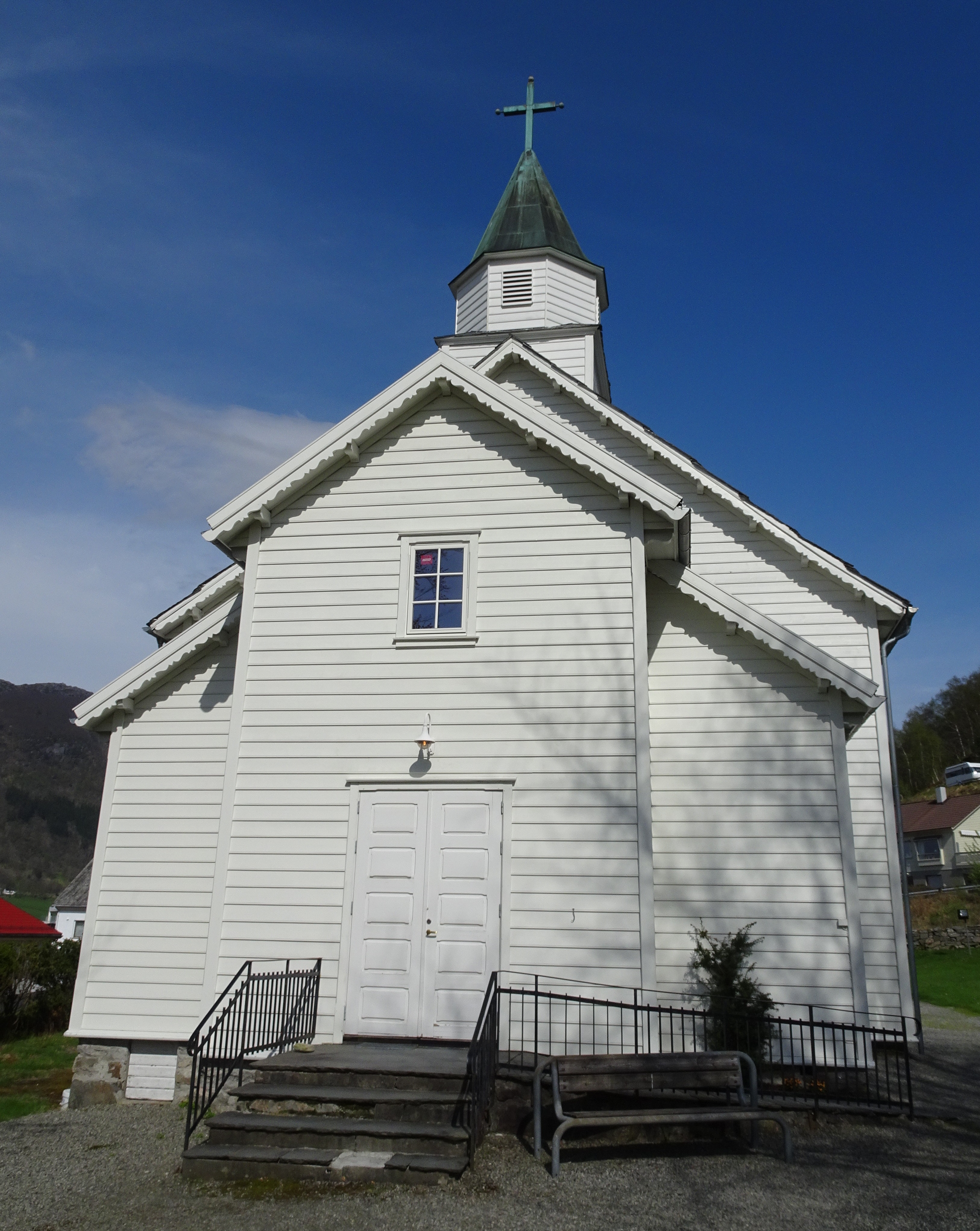
View of the church in 2018

The first known church at Ølen was a stave church that was first mentioned in historical records in 1326, but it was not new that year. The original Ølen Church was built on a steep, prominent moraine ridge overlooking the village and fjord about 200 metres (660 ft) southeast of the present church site. In 1733, the old church was heavily renovated and rebuilt with a new timber-framed nave being built by the priest of Fjelberg Church who owned the church at that time. Some of the old materials from the old building were reused in the new addition.

In 1874, a new church was built about 200 metres (660 ft) to the west, down the hill by the fjord. This church at Ølen was consecrated on 20 November 1874 by the local Dean Kierulff from Stord Church. Shortly afterwards, the old church was torn down, but the small entrance area to the old church was kept and converted into a small tool shed that would be used for the cemetery. The cemetery that surrounded the old church is still in use today as there was no room for a cemetery at the site of the new church.

== See also ==
- List of churches in Rogaland
