= Vatsvatnet =

Lake in Rogaland, Norway

- Storavatnet
- Interactive map of Vatsvatnet
- Location: Vindafjord Municipality, Rogaland
- Coordinates: 59.51262°N 5.71404°E
- Primary outflows: Åmselva river
- Basin countries: Norway
- Max. length: 5.8 kilometres (3.6 mi)
- Max. width: 900 metres (3,000 ft)
- Surface area: 2.16 km^{2} (0.83 sq mi)
- Shore length^{1}: 14.22 kilometres (8.84 mi)
- Surface elevation: 15 metres (49 ft)
- References: NVE
- ^{1} Shore length is not a well-defined measure.

Vatsvatnet is a lake in Vindafjord Municipality in Rogaland county, Norway. The 2.16-square-kilometre (0.83 sq mi) lake lies south of the European route E134 highway and north of the village of Vats. The long, narrow lake is 5.8 kilometres (3.6 mi) long, and has a maximum width of 900 metres (3,000 ft). The primary outflow of the lake is the river Åmselva which flows south into the Vatsfjorden.

== See also ==
- List of lakes in Norway
