= Vindafjord Municipality =

Municipality in Rogaland, Norway

Vindafjord Municipality Vindafjord kommune
- Municipality
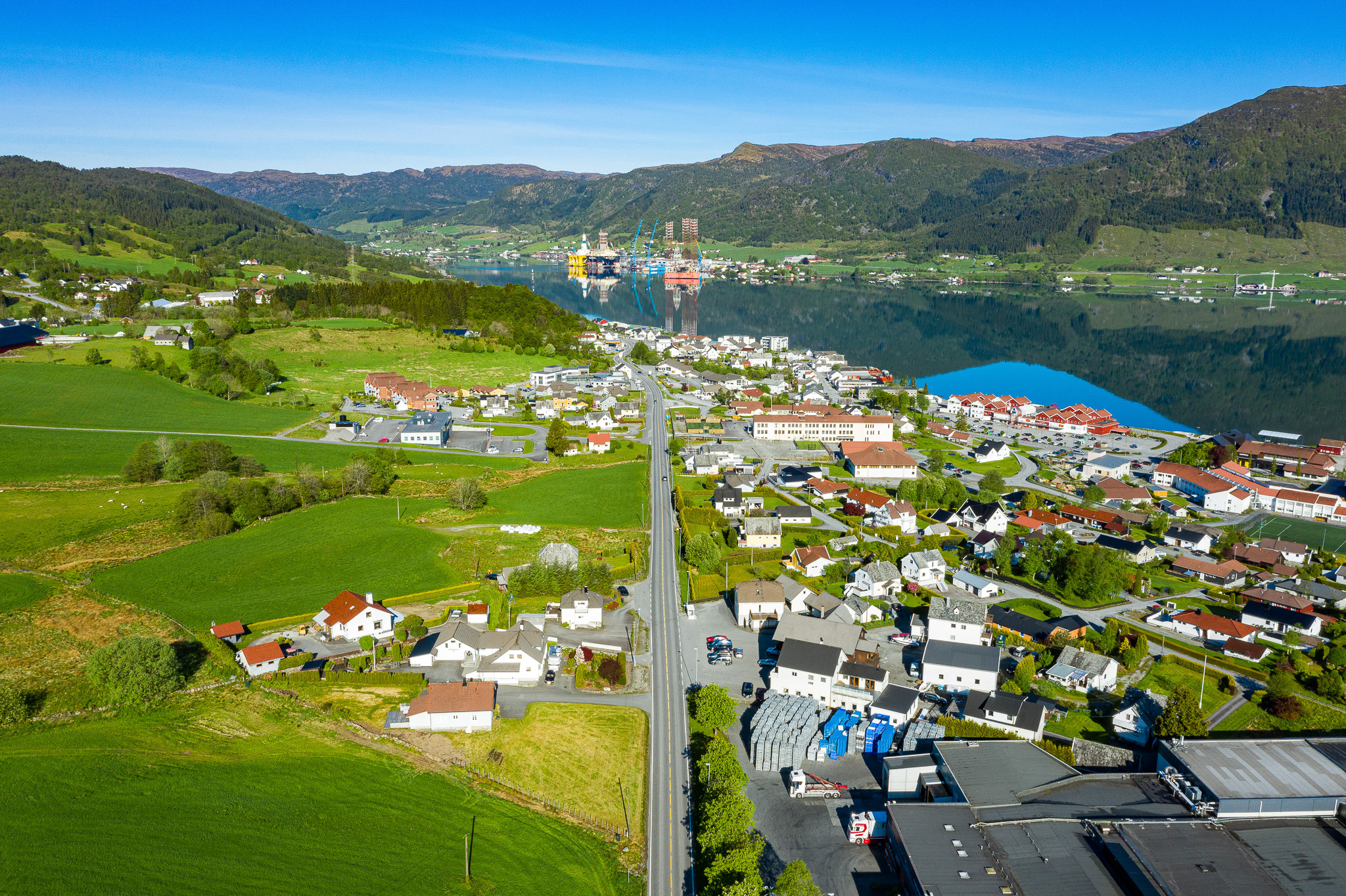
- View of the municipal centre of Ølensjøen

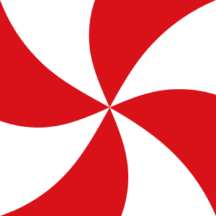
- Flag Coat of arms

- Rogaland within Norway

- Vindafjord within Rogaland
- Coordinates: 59°32′44″N 05°49′05″E
- Country: Norway
- County: Rogaland
- District: Haugaland
- Established: 1 Jan 1965
  - Preceded by: Sandeid, Vats, Imsland, Vikedal, and Skjold municipalities
- Administrative centre: Ølensjøen

Government
  - Mayor (2011): Ole Johan Vierdal (Sp)

Area
  - Total: 620.53 km^{2} (239.59 sq mi)
  - Land: 598.85 km^{2} (231.22 sq mi)
  - Water: 21.68 km^{2} (8.37 sq mi) 3.5%
  - Rank: #185 in Norway
- Highest elevation: 1,013.75 m (3,326.0 ft)

Population (2026)
  - Total: 9,181
  - Rank: #123 in Norway
  - Density: 14.8/km^{2} (38/sq mi)
  - Change (10 years): ▲ +4.5%
- Demonym: Vindafjording

Official language
  - Norwegian form: Nynorsk
- Time zone: UTC+01:00 (CET)
  - Summer (DST): UTC+02:00 (CEST)
- ISO 3166 code: NO-1160
- Website: Official website

Vindafjord is a municipality in Rogaland county, Norway. It is part of the traditional district of Haugaland. Since 2005, the administrative centre of the municipality has been the village of Ølen (prior to that time it was the village of Sandeid). Other villages in the municipality include Bjoa, Imslandsjøen, Ølensvåg, Skjold, Vats, Vikebygd, and Vikedal. The municipality is centered on the Vindafjorden and Sandeidfjorden in the east and it lies north and east of the Skjoldafjorden in the west.

The 620.53-square-kilometre (239.59 sq mi) municipality is the 185th largest by area out of the 357 municipalities in Norway. Vindafjord Municipality is the 123rd most populous municipality in Norway with a population of 9,181. The municipality's population density is 14.8 inhabitants per square kilometre (38/sq mi) and its population has increased by 4.5% over the previous 10-year period.

== General information ==
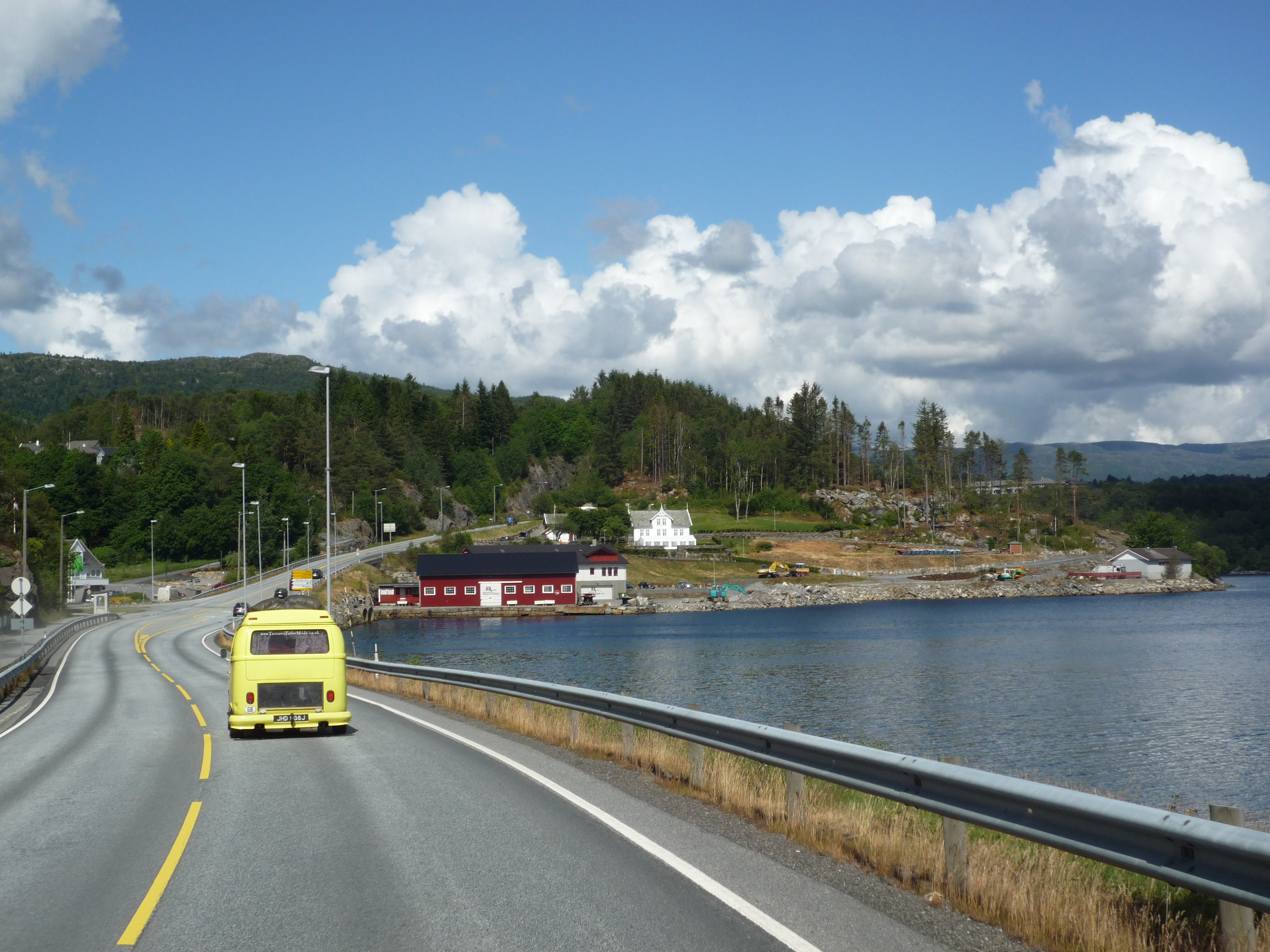
View of the E134 highway in Skjold, Vindafjord

During the 1960s, there were many municipal mergers across Norway due to the work of the Schei Committee. On 1 January 1965, the new Vindafjord Municipality was created from several areas in northern Rogaland county:

- all of Sandeid Municipality (population: 876)
- the Liarheim and Langeland areas of Skjold Municipality on the north side of the Skjoldafjorden (population: 1,262)
- most of Vats Municipality except for the Breidal and Stølsvik farms (population: 1,128)
- the part of Imsland Municipality located north of the Vindafjorden (population: 372)
- most of Vikedal Municipality except for the Hapnes and Dokskar farms (population: 978)

Initially, Vindafjord Municipality had 4,616 residents. On 1 January 1969, the Sponevik farm (population: 6) was transferred from Vindafjord Municipality to the neighboring Tysvær Municipality. Then on 1 January 1978, the Vormestrand area along the southern shore of the Vindafjorden (population: 13) was transferred to the neighboring Suldal Municipality.

On 1 January 2006, Vindafjord Municipality merged with the neighboring Ølen Municipality (population: 3,420). Ølen Municipality had transferred from Hordaland county to Rogaland county 2002. After the merger, the municipal centre of Vindafjord Municipality was moved from the village of Sandeid to the larger village of Ølensjøen, which had been the administrative centre of the old Ølen Municipality.

=== Name ===
The municipality (created in 1965) is named after the Vindafjorden (Old Norse: Vindafjǫrðr), a fjord that runs through the eastern part of the municipality. The first element is derived from the verb vinda which means "to turn" or "to twist", referring to the sharp turn of the fjord at Dragneset. The last element is fjǫrðr which means "fjord".

=== Coat of arms ===
The original coat of arms was granted on 12 December 1986 and it was in use until a new coat of arms was approved on 10 March 2006. The official blazon is "Gules, five chevrons argent two over two over one" (Norwegian: På raud grunn fem svevande kvite sparrar, 2-2-1). This means the arms have a red field (background) and the charge is a set of five chevrons. The charge has a tincture of argent which means it is commonly colored white, but if it is made out of metal, then silver is used. The design was meant to give the appearance of a collection of rorbuer or nauster (these are typical Norwegian boat houses that are often painted red and white). There were five shapes used in order to represent the five predecessor municipalitites that were merged into Vindafjord in 1965: Sandeid, Vikedal, Imsland, Vats, and Skjold. The arms were designed by John Digernes. The municipal flag had the same design as the coat of arms.

A new coat of arms was granted on 10 March 2006, shortly after the merger of Ølen Municipality with Vindafjord Municipality. The new arms were a mix of the arms of the two municipalities which were merged. The swirling design is taken from the old coat of arms of Ølen Municipality and the colours (red and silver/white) are from the old arms of Vindafjord Municipality. The official blazon is "Gyronny embowed argent and gules" (Norwegian: Åttedelt av kvitt og raudt ved virvelsnitt). This means the arms are a whirl design that divides the shield into 8 curved sections. The field (background) alternates colors, with half having a tincture of green and the other half have a tincture of argent which means it is commonly colored white, but if it is made out of metal, then silver is used. The design was chosen to symbolise the way that several major roads come together in the municipality, making it an important centre of trade. The arms were designed by Vigdis Viland. The new municipal flag has the same design as the coat of arms.

Current arms of Vindafjord (since 2006)

Old arms of Vindafjord Municipality (1986-2005)

Old arms of Ølen Municipality (1986-2005)

=== Churches ===
The Church of Norway has eight parishes (sokn) within Vindafjord Municipality. It is part of the Haugaland prosti (deanery) in the Diocese of Stavanger.

Churches in Vindafjord Municipality
Parish (sokn)	Church name	Location of the church	Year built
Bjoa	Bjoa Church	Bjoa	1895
Imsland	Imsland Church	Imslandsjøen	1861
Sandeid	Sandeid Church	Sandeid	1904
Skjold	Skjold Church	Skjold	1999
Vats	Vats Church	Vats	1855
Vikebygd	Vikebygd Church	Vikebygd	1937
Vikedal	Vikedal Church	Vikedal	1881
Ølen	Ølen Church	Ølensjøen	1874

== Government ==
Vindafjord Municipality is responsible for primary education (through 10th grade), outpatient health services, senior citizen services, welfare and other social services, zoning, economic development, and municipal roads and utilities. The municipality is governed by a municipal council of directly elected representatives. The mayor is indirectly elected by a vote of the municipal council. The municipality is under the jurisdiction of the Haugaland og Sunnhordland District Court and the Gulating Court of Appeal.

=== Municipal council ===
The municipal council (Kommunestyre) of Vindafjord Municipality is made up of 25 representatives that are elected to four year terms. The tables below show the current and historical composition of the council by political party.

Vindafjord kommunestyre 2023–2027
Party name (in Nynorsk)	Number of representatives
Labour Party (Arbeidarpartiet)	2
Progress Party (Framstegspartiet)	3
Conservative Party (Høgre)	5
Christian Democratic Party (Kristeleg Folkeparti)	3
Centre Party (Senterpartiet)	8
Socialist Left Party (Sosialistisk Venstreparti)	1
Vindafjord List (Vindafjordlista)	3
Total number of members:	25

Vindafjord kommunestyre 2019–2023
Party name (in Nynorsk)	Number of representatives
Labour Party (Arbeidarpartiet)	3
Progress Party (Framstegspartiet)	2
Green Party (Miljøpartiet Dei Grøne)	1
Conservative Party (Høgre)	5
Christian Democratic Party (Kristeleg Folkeparti)	3
Centre Party (Senterpartiet)	9
Socialist Left Party (Sosialistisk Venstreparti)	1
Bjoa local list (Bjoa bygdeliste)	1
Total number of members:	25

Vindafjord kommunestyre 2015–2019
Party name (in Nynorsk)	Number of representatives
Labour Party (Arbeidarpartiet)	3
Progress Party (Framstegspartiet)	2
Conservative Party (Høgre)	3
Christian Democratic Party (Kristeleg Folkeparti)	3
Centre Party (Senterpartiet)	10
Socialist Left Party (Sosialistisk Venstreparti)	1
Liberal Party (Venstre)	2
Bjoa local list (Bjoa bygdeliste)	1
Total number of members:	25

Vindafjord kommunestyre 2011–2015
Party name (in Nynorsk)	Number of representatives
Labour Party (Arbeidarpartiet)	4
Progress Party (Framstegspartiet)	3
Conservative Party (Høgre)	5
Christian Democratic Party (Kristeleg Folkeparti)	3
Centre Party (Senterpartiet)	8
Socialist Left Party (Sosialistisk Venstreparti)	1
Bjoa local list (Bjoa bygdeliste)	1
Total number of members:	25

Vindafjord kommunestyre 2007–2011
Party name (in Nynorsk)	Number of representatives
Labour Party (Arbeidarpartiet)	5
Progress Party (Framstegspartiet)	3
Conservative Party (Høgre)	4
Christian Democratic Party (Kristeleg Folkeparti)	3
Centre Party (Senterpartiet)	9
Bjoa local list (Bjoa bygdeliste)	1
Total number of members:	25

Vindafjord kommunestyre 2003–2007
Party name (in Nynorsk)	Number of representatives
Labour Party (Arbeidarpartiet)	4
Conservative Party (Høgre)	4
Christian Democratic Party (Kristeleg Folkeparti)	2
Centre Party (Senterpartiet)	6
Skold and Vats cross-party list (Skjold og Vats tverrpolitisk liste)	3
Total number of members:	19
Note: On 1 January 2006, Ølen Municipality became part of Vindafjord Municipality.

Vindafjord kommunestyre 1999–2003
Party name (in Nynorsk)	Number of representatives
Labour Party (Arbeidarpartiet)	4
Conservative Party (Høgre)	4
Christian Democratic Party (Kristeleg Folkeparti)	4
Centre Party (Senterpartiet)	6
Vikedal and Imsland local list (Vikedal og Imsland bygdeliste)	2
Cross-party list for Skjold/Vats and Sandeid/Ilsvåg (Tverrpolitisk liste for Skjold/Vats og Sandeid/Ilsvåg)	9
Total number of members:	29

Vindafjord kommunestyre 1995–1999
Party name (in Nynorsk)	Number of representatives
Labour Party (Arbeidarpartiet)	3
Conservative Party (Høgre)	3
Christian Democratic Party (Kristeleg Folkeparti)	4
Centre Party (Senterpartiet)	10
Vikedal and Imsland local list (Skjold og Vats bygdeliste)	6
Sandeid and Ilsvåg local list (Sandeid og Ilsvåg bygdeliste)	3
Total number of members:	29

Vindafjord kommunestyre 1991–1995
Party name (in Nynorsk)	Number of representatives
Labour Party (Arbeidarpartiet)	2
Conservative Party (Høgre)	3
Christian Democratic Party (Kristeleg Folkeparti)	3
Centre Party (Senterpartiet)	8
Skjold and Vats local list (Skjold og Vats bygdeliste)	8
Sandeid and Ilsvåg local list (Sandeid og Ilsvåg bygdeliste)	3
Local list for Skjold (Bygdeliste for Skjold)	1
Left wind (Venstrevind)	1
Total number of members:	29

Vindafjord kommunestyre 1987–1991
Party name (in Nynorsk)	Number of representatives
Labour Party (Arbeidarpartiet)	2
Conservative Party (Høgre)	3
Christian Democratic Party (Kristeleg Folkeparti)	2
Skjold and Vats local list (Skjold og Vats bygdeliste)	11
Sandeid and Ilsvåg local list (Sandeid og Ilsvåg bygdeliste)	4
Vikedal and Imsland local list (Vikedal og Imsland bygdeliste)	6
Left wind (Venstrevind)	1
Total number of members:	29

Vindafjord kommunestyre 1983–1987
Party name (in Nynorsk)	Number of representatives
Labour Party (Arbeidarpartiet)	4
Conservative Party (Høgre)	6
Christian Democratic Party (Kristeleg Folkeparti)	5
Centre Party (Senterpartiet)	10
Sandeid and Ilsvåg local list (Sandeid og Ilsvåg bygdeliste)	3
Left wind (Venstrevind)	1
Total number of members:	29

Vindafjord kommunestyre 1979–1983
Party name (in Nynorsk)	Number of representatives
Labour Party (Arbeidarpartiet)	2
Conservative Party (Høgre)	7
Christian Democratic Party (Kristeleg Folkeparti)	5
Centre Party (Senterpartiet)	8
Vindafjord non-partisan women's list (Vindafjord upolitisk kvinneliste)	1
Sandeid and Ilsvåg local list (Sandeid og Ilsvåg bygdeliste)	3
Vikedal and Imsland local list (Vikedal og Imsland bygdeliste)	3
Total number of members:	29

Vindafjord kommunestyre 1975–1979
Party name (in Nynorsk)	Number of representatives
Labour Party (Arbeidarpartiet)	3
Conservative Party (Høgre)	6
Christian Democratic Party (Kristeleg Folkeparti)	6
Centre Party (Senterpartiet)	11
Skjold local list (Skjold Bygdeliste)	1
Non-partisan list for Skjold and Vats (Upolitisk liste for Skjold og Vats)	2
Total number of members:	29

Vindafjord kommunestyre 1971–1975
Party name (in Nynorsk)	Number of representatives
Labour Party (Arbeidarpartiet)	2
Local List(s) (Lokale lister)	27
Total number of members:	29

Vindafjord kommunestyre 1967–1971
Party name (in Nynorsk)	Number of representatives
Labour Party (Arbeidarpartiet)	2
Christian Democratic Party (Kristeleg Folkeparti)	4
Local List(s) (Lokale lister)	23
Total number of members:	29

=== Mayors ===
The mayor (Nynorsk: ordførar) of Vindafjord Municipality is the political leader of the municipality and the chairperson of the municipal council. The following people have held this position:

- 1965–1965: Olav Koltveit (LL)
- 1965–1969: Gunnar Saua (KrF)
- 1969–1971: Gerhard Kyvik (LL)
- 1971–1975: Herlof O. Lærdal (LL)
- 1975–1987: Trygve Mikal Viga (Sp)
- 1987–1991: Gunnar Vierdal (H)
- 1991–1999: Signy Rønnevik (Sp)
- 1999–2003: Oddvard Haugland (KrF)
- 2003–2005: Reidar Håvås (Ap)
- 2005–2011: Arne Bergsvåg (Sp)
- 2011–present: Ole Johan Vierdal (Sp)

== Geography ==
Vindafjord Municipality lies south of the Hardangerfjorden and north of the Skjoldafjorden and Vindafjorden. The Sandeidfjorden flows through the municipality also. The lake Vatsvatnet lies in the central part of the municipality. The municipality sits near the base of the Haugalandet peninsula, connecting the mainland to the city of Haugesund on the western end of the peninsula. The European route E134 highway runs through the municipality. The highest point in the municipality is the 1,013.75-metre (3,326.0 ft) tall mountain Bjørndalsnuten, located on the border with Etne Municipality.

Kvinnherad Municipality is located to the north, Etne Municipality is located to the northeast, Suldal Municipality is located to the southeast, Tysvær Municipality is located to the southwest, and Sveio Municipality is located to the west.

== Notable people ==
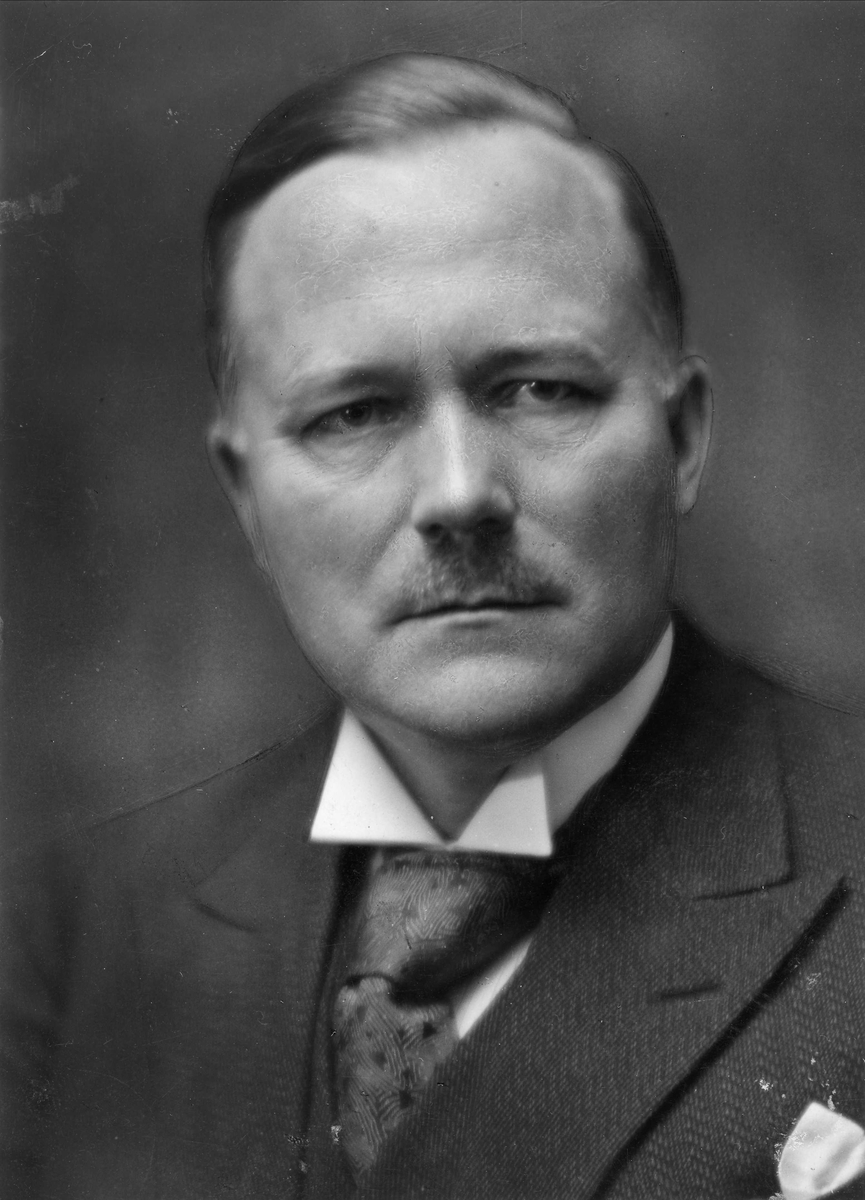
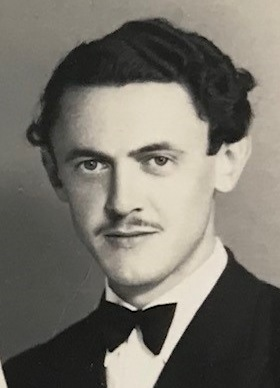
Jens Hundseid (1935) and R. Eikeland (1949)
- Knud Baade (1808 in Skjold - 1879), a painter of portraits and landscapes, particularly moonlight paintings
- Jens Hundseid (1883 in Vikedal – 1965), a Norwegian politician who was Prime Minister of Norway from 1932 to 1933;
- Ragnvald Eikeland (1921 – 1960, Øvre Vats), an artist and painter
- Thormod Næs (1930 in Skjold – 1997), a sport shooter who competed at the 1964 Summer Olympics
- Per Øyvind Heradstveit (1932 in Skjold – 2004), a TV journalist and non-fiction writer
- Agnes Ravatn (born 1983 in Ølen), a novelist, columnist, and journalist

== Gallery ==
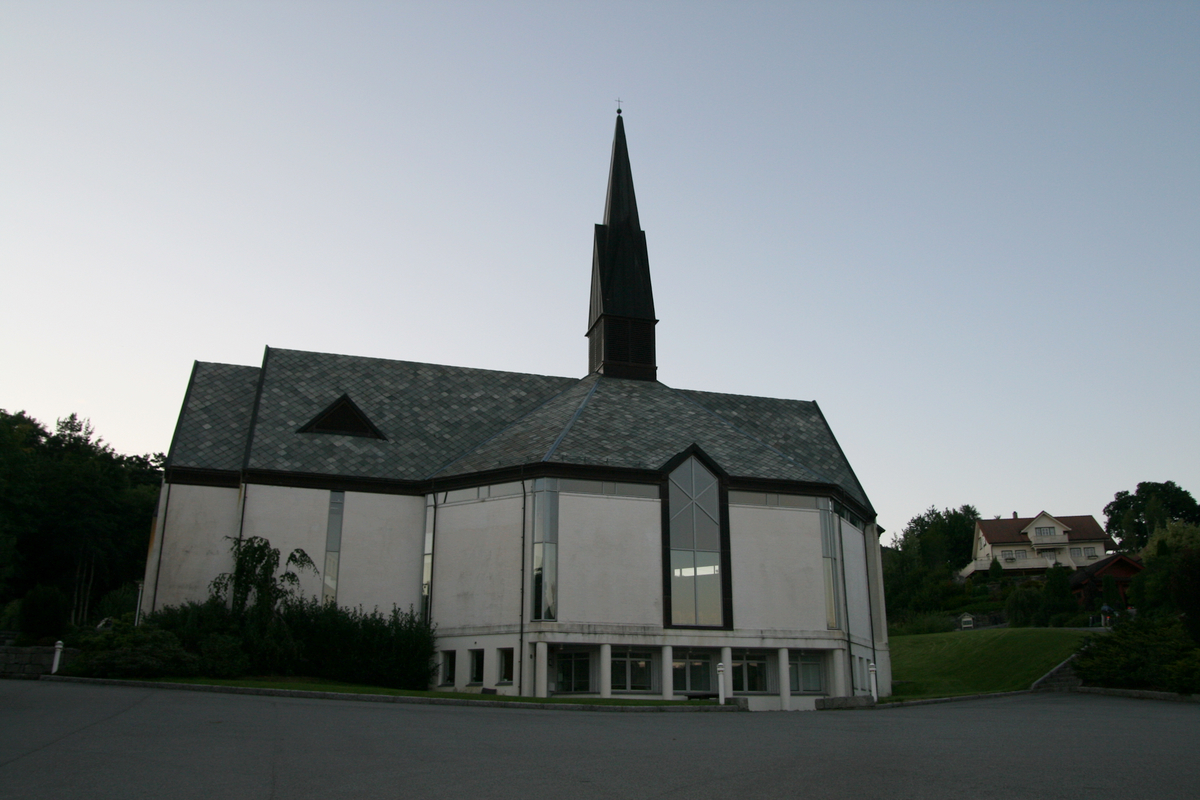
Skjold Church

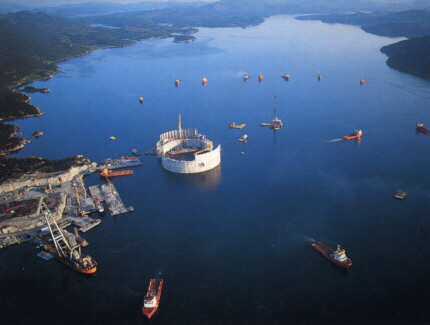
Building of Ekofisk wall in Vikebygd

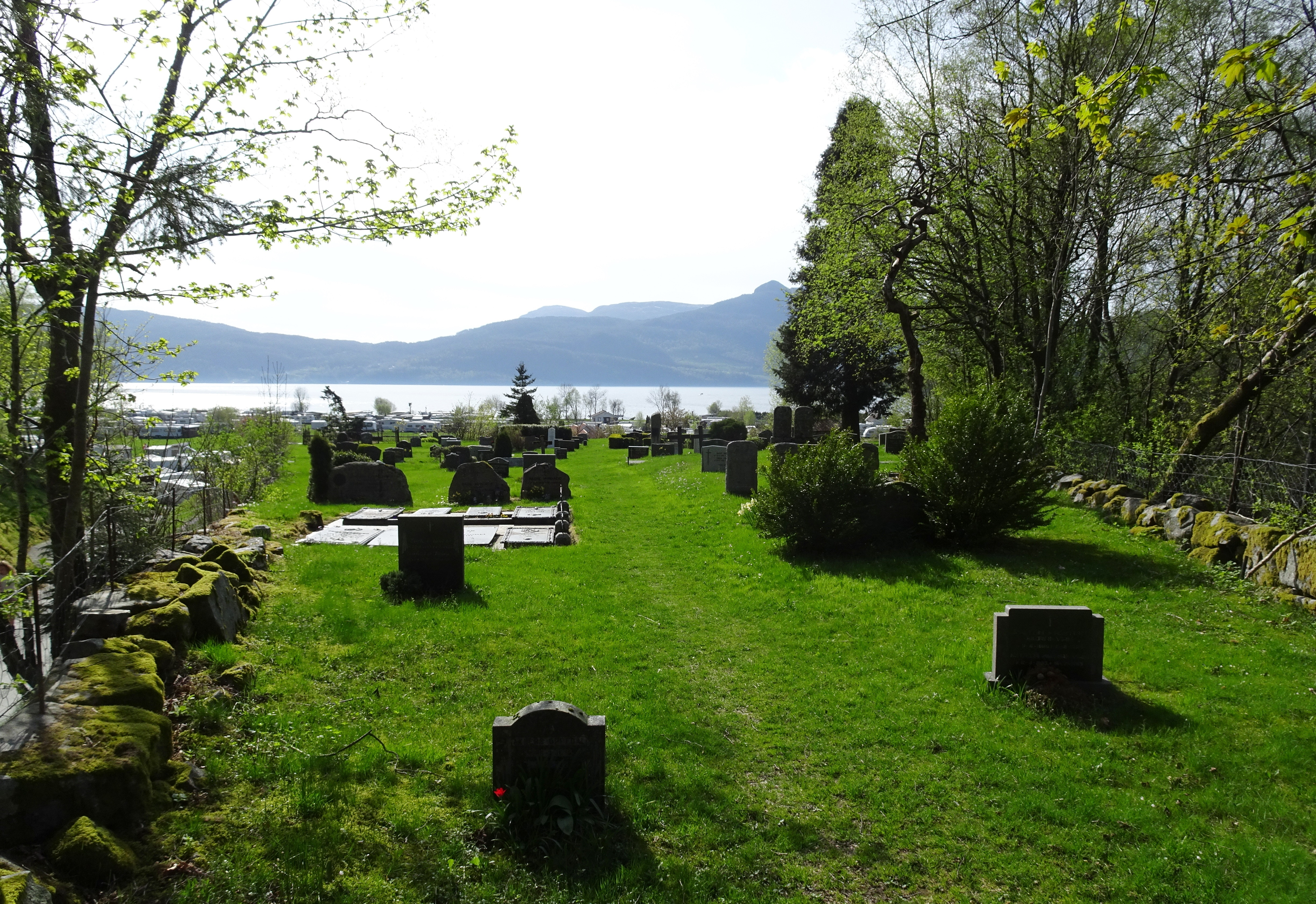
Old Vikedal churchyard
