= Vikebygd Church =

Church in Rogaland, Norway

- Vikebygd kyrkje
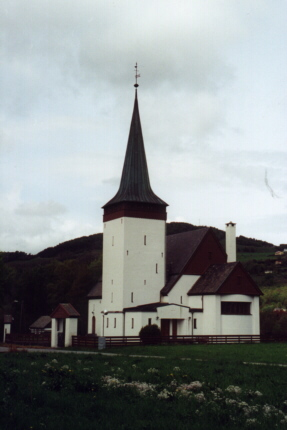
- View of the church
- Vikebygd Church
- 59.591314°N 5.586874°E
- Location: Vindafjord Municipality, Rogaland
- Country: Norway
- Denomination: Church of Norway
- Churchmanship: Evangelical Lutheran

History
- Status: Parish church
- Founded: 13th century
- Consecrated: 1937

Architecture
- Functional status: Active
- Architect: Torgeir Alvsaker
- Architectural type: Long church
- Completed: 1937 (89 years ago)

Specifications
- Materials: Stone

Administration
- Diocese: Stavanger bispedømme
- Deanery: Haugaland prosti
- Parish: Vikebygd
- Norwegian Cultural Heritage Site
- Type: Church
- Status: Protected
- ID: 85839

Vikebygd Church (Norwegian: Vikebygd kyrkje) is a parish church of the Church of Norway in Vindafjord Municipality in Rogaland county, Norway. It is located in the village of Vikebygd. It is the church for the Vikebygd parish which is part of the Haugaland prosti (deanery) in the Diocese of Stavanger. The white, stone church was built in a long church style in 1937 using designs by the architect Torgeir Alvsaker.

== History ==
The first church at Vikebygd was built in the Middle Ages and it was first mentioned in historical records in 1315. That church was most likely a stave church. The original church was torn down in 1682 and replaced with a timber-framed church on the same site. This second church eventually needed replacing and in 1872 a new church was built near the old one, but somewhat closer to the fjord. The new church was designed by the architect Ole Vangberg and it was consecrated on 16 October 1872 by the Bishop Peter Hersleb Graah Birkeland. After the new church was in use, the old church was torn down and the materials sold off in 1873.

On 16 April 1926, the church at Vikebygd burned down. The church was quickly rebuilt in a style reminiscent of the old stave churches, designed by the architect Torgeir Alvsaker. This new (4th) church was consecrated on 11 July 1928 by the Bishop Peter Hognestad. Sadly, this new church was very short-lived. A fire claimed this church on 8 December 1930, just about two and a half years after its completion. A few years later in 1937, a new church was built by the same architect, but it was built about 70 metres (230 ft) up the hill from the fjord where the old church was previously located. The new stone church was consecrated by the Bishop Andreas Fleischer.

== See also ==
- List of churches in Rogaland
