= Suldal =

Suldal may refer to:

== Places ==
- Suldal Municipality, a municipality in Rogaland county, Norway
- Suldalsosen, a village (also known as Suldal) in Suldal Municipality in Rogaland county, Norway
- Suldal Church, a church in Suldal Municipality in Rogaland county, Norway
- Suldal River, or Suldalslågen, a river in Suldal Municipality in Rogaland county, Norway
- Lake Suldal, or Suldalsvatnet, a lake in Suldal Municipality in Rogaland county, Norway
