= Erfjord =

Erfjord may refer to:

== Places ==
- Erfjorden, a fjord in Suldal Municipality in Rogaland county, Norway
- Erfjord Municipality, a former municipality in Rogaland county, Norway
- Erfjord (village), a village in Suldal Municipality in Rogaland county, Norway
- Erfjord Bridge, a bridge in Suldal Municipality in Rogaland county, Norway
- Erfjord Church, a church in Suldal Municipality in Rogaland county, Norway

== Other ==
- Edvard Førre Erfjord, a member of the Norwegian songwriting and production duo "Electric"
- Kjell Erfjord (born 1940), a Norwegian former educator and politician for the Christian Democratic Party
- 5019 Erfjord, a minor planet
