= Snønuten =

Mountain in Rogaland, Norway

Highest point
- Elevation: 1,604 m (5,262 ft)
- Prominence: 545 m (1,788 ft)
- Isolation: 24.8 km (15.4 mi) to Trollaskeinuten
- Coordinates: 59°31′13″N 6°51′48″E

Geography
- Location: Rogaland, Norway

Snønuten is a mountain in Suldal Municipality in Rogaland county, Norway. The 1,604-metre (5,262 ft) mountain lies about 35 kilometres (22 mi) east of the village of Sand. The mountains Kaldafjellet, Leirnuten, and Steinkilenuten all lie to the southeast of Snønuten.

== See also ==
- List of mountains of Norway
