= Nesflaten =

- Village
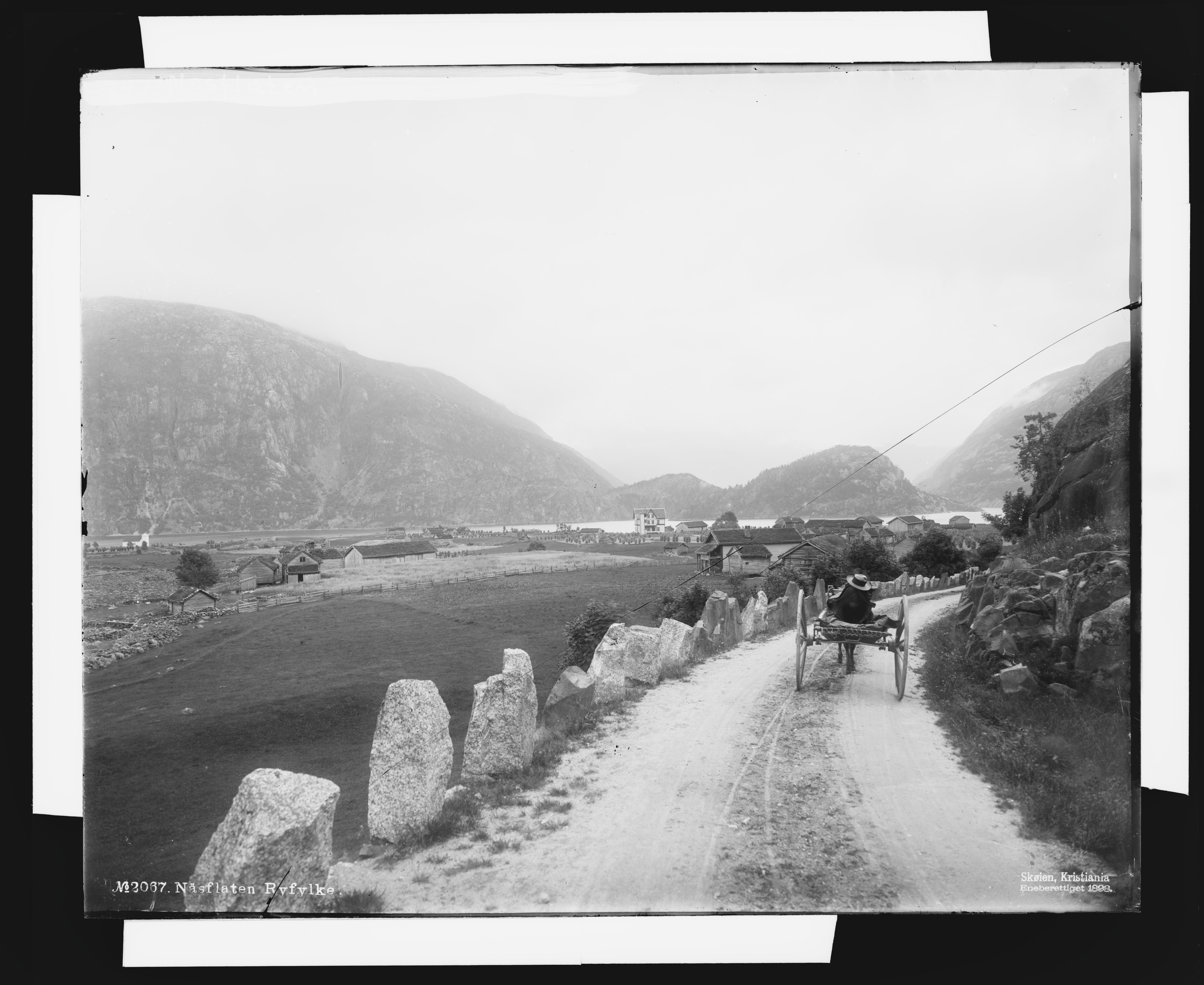
- View of the village (c. 1880s)
- Interactive map of Nesflaten
- Coordinates: 59.64649°N 6.79976°E
- Country: Norway
- Region: Western Norway
- County: Rogaland
- District: Ryfylke
- Municipality: Suldal Municipality
- Elevation: 87 m (285 ft)
- Time zone: UTC+01:00 (CET)
  - Summer (DST): UTC+02:00 (CEST)
- Post Code: 4244 Nesflaten

Nesflaten is a village in Suldal Municipality in Rogaland county, Norway. The village is located on the northern end of the lake Suldalsvatnet, just west of the smaller village of Roalkvam. Nesflaten lies along the Norwegian National Road 13 which connects it to the village of Suldalsosen to the southwest and to the village of Botnen (in the neighboring Ullensvang Municipality in Vestland county). Nesflaten Chapel is located in the village.

The village lies in a valley in the northwestern part of Suldal Municipality. It is surrounded by many mountains to the northwest of the village including Mælen, Trollaskeinuten, Fitjanuten, Vassdalseggi, Kistenuten, and Knoda.
