= Simlenuten =

Mountain in Rogaland, Norway

Highest point
- Elevation: 1,439 m (4,721 ft)
- Prominence: 115 m (377 ft)
- Parent peak: Raudberga
- Coordinates: 59°44′28″N 7°04′43″E

Geography
- Location: Rogaland, Norway

Simlenuten is a mountain in Suldal Municipality in Rogaland county, Norway. The 1,439-metre (4,721 ft) tall mountain is located immediately northwest of the lake Isvatnet, on the east side of the Kvanndalen valley, just a short distance south of the mountains Kistenuten and Raudberga.

== See also ==
- List of mountains of Norway
