= Trollaskeinuten =

Mountain in Rogaland, Norway

Highest point
- Elevation: 1,622 m (5,322 ft)
- Prominence: 443 m (1,453 ft)
- Parent peak: Vassdalseggi
- Isolation: 7.2 km (4.5 mi)
- Coordinates: 59°43′56″N 6°59′50″E

Geography
- Location: Rogaland, Norway

Trollaskeinuten is a mountain in Suldal Municipality in Rogaland county, Norway. The 1,622-metre (5,322 ft) tall mountain lies in the mountainous northeastern corner of the municipality, surrounded by the mountains Knoda, Kistenuten, Vassdalseggi, Fitjanuten, and Mælen. Trollaskeinuten lies about 15 kilometres (9.3 mi) northeast of the village of Nesflaten.

== See also ==
- List of mountains of Norway
