= Raudberga =

Mountain in Rogaland, Norway

Highest point
- Elevation: 1,431 m (4,695 ft)
- Prominence: 104 m (341 ft)
- Parent peak: Vassdalseggi
- Isolation: 2.9 km (1.8 mi)
- Coordinates: 59°44′01″N 7°03′47″E

Geography
- Location: Rogaland, Norway

Raudberga is a mountain in Suldal Municipality in Rogaland county, Norway. The 1,433-metre (4,701 ft) tall mountain lies on the east side of the Kvanndalen valley, about 7 kilometres (4.3 mi) south of the mountain Kistenuten.

== See also ==
- List of mountains of Norway
