= Knoda =

Mountain in Norway

Highest point
- Elevation: 1,542 m (5,059 ft)
- Prominence: 220 m (720 ft)
- Parent peak: Blåbergnuten
- Isolation: 3.7 km (2.3 mi)
- Coordinates: 59.77117°N 6.97732°E

Geography
- Location: Rogaland and Vestland, Norway

Knoda is a mountain in southern Norway. The 1,542-metre (5,059 ft) tall mountain lies on the border of Suldal Municipality (in Rogaland county) and Ullensvang Municipality (in Vestland county). The mountain lies about 10 kilometres (6.2 mi) southeast of the village of Røldal. The mountains Kistenuten, Vassdalseggi, and Trollaskeinuten all lie to the southeast of Knoda.

== See also ==
- List of mountains of Norway
