= Lågen =

Lågen is a Norwegian word meaning "the river". It may refer to:

== Places ==
- Gudbrandsdalslågen, a river running through the Gudbrandsdalen valley in Innlandet county in Norway
- Numedalslågen, a river running through the Numedalen valley in Vestland, Buskerud, and Vestfold counties in Norway
- Suldalslågen, a river running through the Suldalen valley in Rogaland county in Norway
