= Leirnuten =

Mountain in Rogaland, Norway

Highest point
- Elevation: 1,487 m (4,879 ft)
- Prominence: 269 m (883 ft)
- Parent peak: Snønuten
- Isolation: 4.1 km (2.5 mi)
- Coordinates: 59°29′44″N 6°55′02″E

Geography
- Location: Rogaland, Norway

Leirnuten is a mountain in Suldal Municipality in Rogaland county, Norway. The 1,486-metre (4,875 ft) mountain lies just to the southwest of the mountain Steinkilenuten, about 20 kilometres (12 mi) south of the village of Nesflaten.
