= Kaldafjellet =

Mountain in Norway

Highest point
- Elevation: 1,480 m (4,860 ft)
- Prominence: 210 m (690 ft)
- Parent peak: Leirnuten
- Isolation: 4.2 km (2.6 mi)
- Coordinates: 59°31′24″N 6°58′49″E

Geography
- Location: Rogaland and Agder, Norway
- Parent range: Setesdalsheiene

Kaldafjellet is a mountain on the border of Agder and Rogaland counties in southern Norway. The mountain lies on the border of Suldal Municipality (in Rogaland county) and Bykle Municipality (in Agder county). The mountain has two peaks: the eastern one lies on the municipal-county border reaching 1,452 metres (4,764 ft), while the highest point on the mountain lies less than 1 kilometre (0.62 mi) to the west, reaching a peak of 1,480 metres (4,860 ft). The prominence of the mountain is 210 metres (690 ft) and the isolation is 4.2 kilometres (2.6 mi).

The mountain sits about 17 kilometres (11 mi) southeast of the village of Nesflaten, just east of the mountain Steinkilenuten (in Suldal Municipality) and it is about 20 kilometres (12 mi) west of Hovden in Bykle Municipality. The lake Ormsavatnet lies just east of the mountain and the lake Holmevatnet.

== See also ==
- List of mountains of Norway by height
