= Suldal Church =

Church in Rogaland, Norway

- Suldal kyrkje
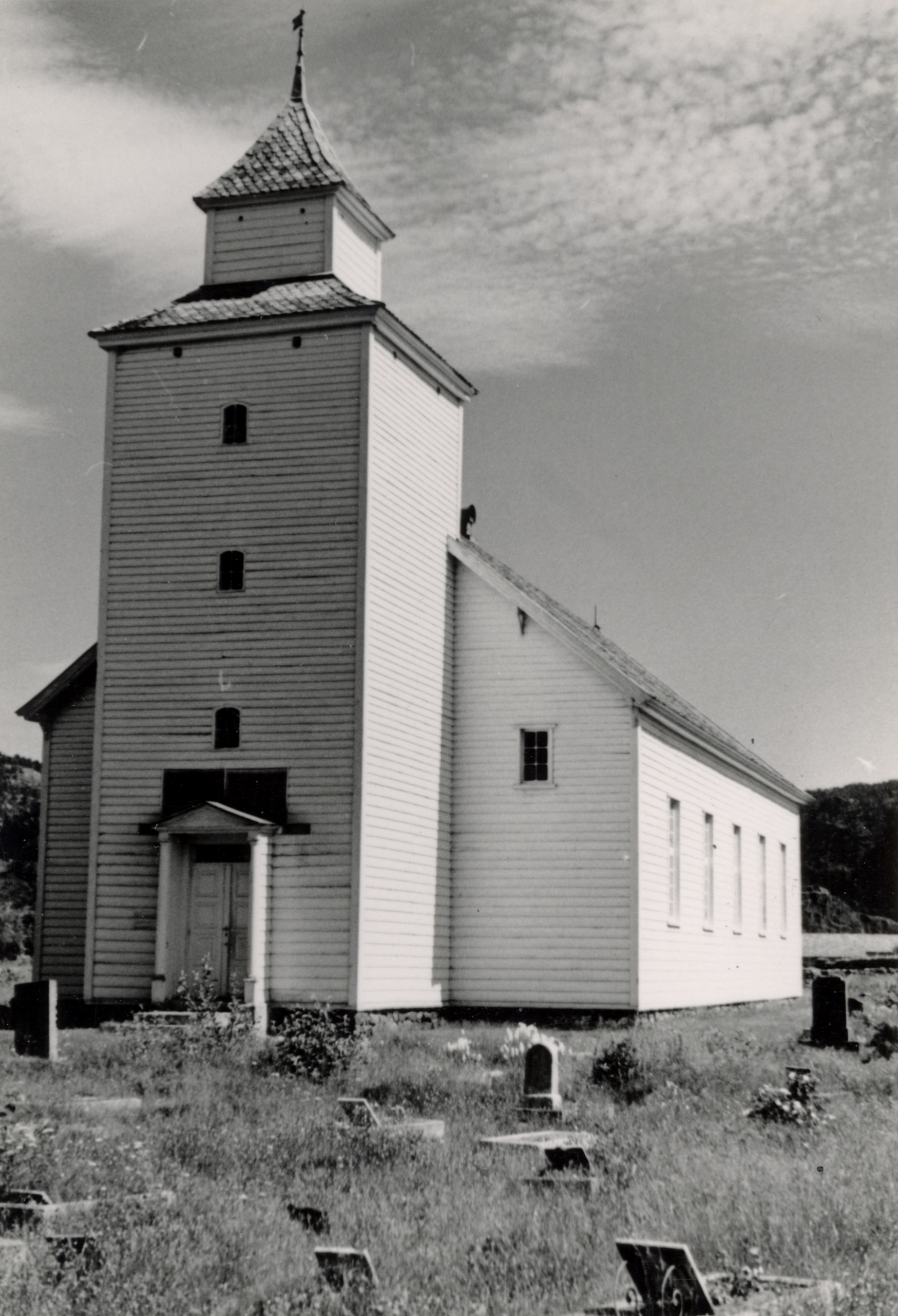
- View of the church (c. 1946)
- Suldal Church
- 59.490130°N 06.494135°E
- Location: Suldal Municipality, Rogaland
- Country: Norway
- Denomination: Church of Norway
- Churchmanship: Evangelical Lutheran

History
- Status: Parish church
- Founded: 11th century
- Consecrated: 1852

Architecture
- Functional status: Active
- Architect: Hans Linstow
- Architectural type: Long church
- Completed: 1852

Specifications
- Capacity: 600
- Materials: Wood

Administration
- Diocese: Stavanger bispedømme
- Deanery: Ryfylke prosti
- Parish: Suldal
- Norwegian Cultural Heritage Site
- Type: Church
- Status: Protected
- ID: 84996

Suldal Church (Norwegian: Suldal kyrkje) is a parish church of the Church of Norway in Suldal Municipality in Rogaland county, Norway. It is located in the village of Suldalsosen, on the shore of the river Suldalslågen, at the southern end of the lake Suldalsvatnet. It is one of the two churches for the Suldal parish which is part of the Ryfylke prosti (deanery) in the Diocese of Stavanger. The white, wooden church was built in a long church design in 1852 using designs by the architect Hans Linstow. The church seats about 600 people.

== History ==
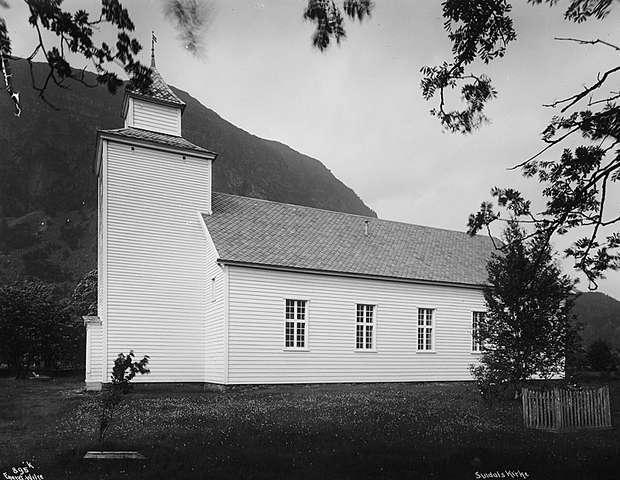
View of the church in 1913

The earliest existing historical records of the church date back to the year 1319, but the church was probably built in the 11th century. The first church here was a stave church and it was historically called Vinje Church since it was located on the Vinje farm, just west of the village of Suldalsosen. During the Late Middle Ages, the priests of Vinje Church were canons at the Stavanger Cathedral. During the 1640s, the church was torn down and replaced with a new timber-framed building. The new church was not fully completed until 1670. This church served the Suldal valley for over 200 years before it was deemed to be too small for the parish.

In 1814, this church served as an election church (Norwegian: valgkirke). Together with more than 300 other parish churches across Norway, it was a polling station for elections to the 1814 Norwegian Constituent Assembly which wrote the Constitution of Norway. This was Norway's first national elections. Each church parish was a constituency that elected people called "electors" who later met together in each county to elect the representatives for the assembly that was to meet at Eidsvoll Manor later that year.

In 1852, a new, larger church was built about 50 metres (160 ft) to the east of the old church. After the new church was completed, the old church was torn down.

== See also ==
- List of churches in Rogaland
