= Ulla-Førre =

Hydroelectric dam in Norway

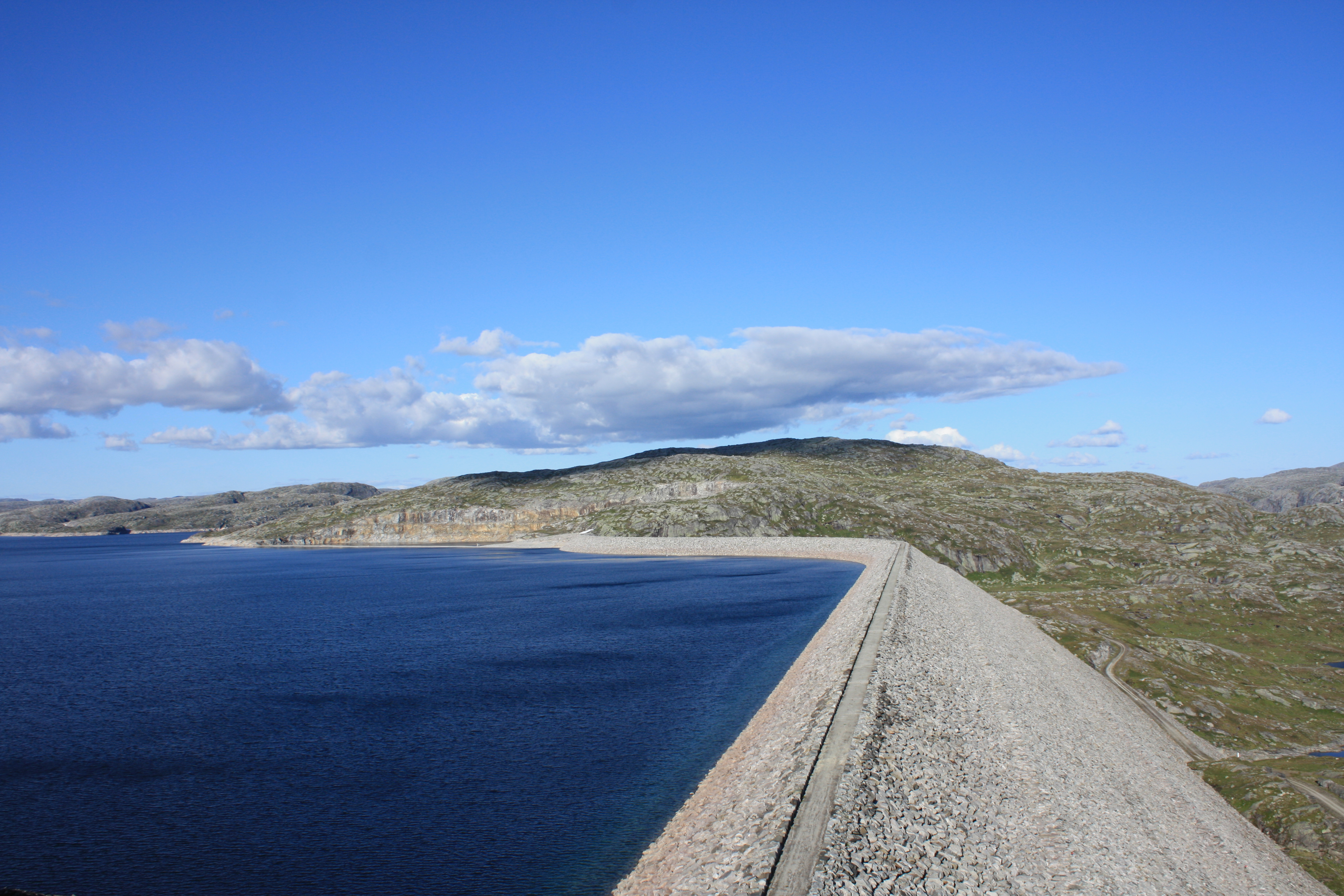
- The artificial lake Blåsjø and Storvassdammen
- Interactive map of Ulla-Førre
- Country: Norway
- Status: Operational
- Owner: Statkraft

Reservoir
- Creates: Blåsjø
- Total capacity: 3.1 km^{3} (0.74 cu mi)
- Active capacity: 7.8 TWh (28 PJ)
- Surface area: 84.48 km^{2} (32.62 sq mi)
- Normal elevation: 930–1,055 metres (3,051–3,461 feet)
- List of power stations

Kvilldal Hydroelectric Power Station
- Installed capacity: 1,240 MW (1,660,000 hp)
- Annual generation: 3,517 GWh (12,660 TJ)

Saurdal Hydroelectric Power Station
- Installed capacity: 640 MW (860,000 hp)
- Annual generation: 1,335 GWh (4,810 TJ)

Hylen Hydroelectric Power Station
- Installed capacity: 160 MW (210,000 hp)
- Annual generation: 583 GWh (2,100 TJ)

Stølsdal Hydroelectric Power Station
- Installed capacity: 17 MW (23,000 hp)
- Annual generation: 51 GWh (180 TJ)

Ulla-Førre is a hydropower complex in Southern Norway. It is situated along the borders of Suldal Municipality and Hjelmeland Municipality (in Rogaland county) and Bykle Municipality (in Agder county), Norway. It has an installed capacity of approximately 2,100 megawatts (2,800,000 hp), and the annual average production is 4.45 terawatt-hours (16.0 PJ) (1987–2006), while its reservoir capacity is about 7.8 TWh (28 PJ); at full production, it can last seven to eight months. The complex includes the artificial lake Blåsjø, which is made by dams around 1,000 metres (3,300 ft) above the sea level. The hydroelectric power stations in the complex are Saurdal, Kvilldal, Hylen and Stølsdal, operated by Statkraft.

== Blåsjø ==
Blåsjø is the tenth largest lake in Norway by area. It is located on the border of Bykle Municipality in Agder county and Hjelmeland Municipality and Suldal Municipality in Rogaland county. The lake is about 20 kilometres (12 mi) west of the village of Bykle. It has a surface area of 84.48 square kilometres (32.62 sq mi). Its surface swings between 930 and 1,055 metres (3,051 and 3,461 ft) above sea level depending on seasonal weather and power consumption, and it has a shoreline of about 200 kilometres (120 mi). At the highest regulated water level, Blåsjø contains 3,105,000,000 cubic metres (4.061×10^{9} yd^{3}) of water.

== Kvilldal Hydroelectric Power Station ==
The Kvilldal Power Station is a located in Suldal Municipality. The facility operates at an installed capacity of 1,240 megawatts (1,660,000 hp), making it the largest power station in Norway in terms of capacity. Statnett plans to upgrade the western grid from 300 kV to 420 kV at a cost of 8 billion kr, partly to accommodate the North Sea Link cable from Kvilldal to Blyth, UK.

== Saurdal Hydroelectric Power Station ==
The Saurdal Power Station is a hydroelectric and pumped-storage power station located in Suldal Municipality. The facility operates at an installed capacity of 674 megawatts (904,000 hp) (in 2015). The average energy absorbed by pumps per year is 1,189 GWh (4,280 TJ) (in 2009 to 2012). The average annual production is 1,335 GWh (4,810 TJ) (up to 2012).

== Hylen Hydroelectric Power Station ==
The Hylen Power Station is located at the bottom of Hylsfjorden in Suldal Municipality. It operates at an installed capacity of 160 megawatts (210,000 hp), with an average annual production of 583 GWh (2,100 TJ). The plant exploits water through a tunnel from the lake Suldalsvatnet.
