= Saudafjorden =

Fjord in Rogaland, Norway

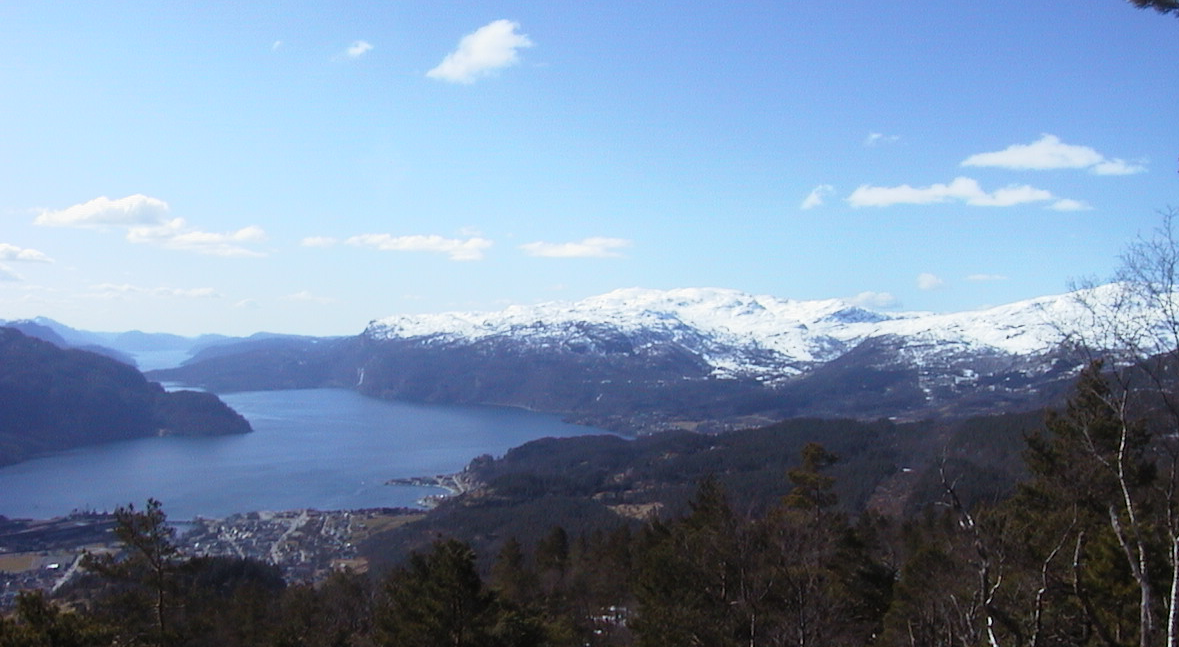
- View of the fjord
- Interactive map of the fjord
- Location: Rogaland county, Norway
- Coordinates: 59.59943°N 6.30775°E
- Type: Fjord
- Primary inflows: Hylsfjorden
- Primary outflows: Sandsfjorden
- Basin countries: Norway
- Max. length: 17 kilometres (11 mi)
- Max. depth: 400 metres (1,300 ft)
- Settlements: Sauda

Saudafjorden is a fjord in Rogaland county, Norway. The fjord stretches from the town of Sauda in Sauda Municipality in the north to the village of Sand in Suldal Municipality where the Saudafjorden and Hylsfjorden join together to form the Sandsfjorden.

The Saudafjorden is the northernmost branch of the main Boknafjord which dominates Rogaland county. The 17-kilometre (11 mi) long Saudafjorden is an open, wide fjord with a depth approaching 400 metres (1,300 ft).

The fjord was carved by the action of glaciers in the ice ages and was flooded by the sea when the later glaciers retreated. The fjord has no marked threshold as the glacial ice flow joined that from the Hylsfjord and flowed into the Sandsfjord.

== See also ==
- List of Norwegian fjords
