= Hålandsosen =

Village in Suldal Municipality, Norway

- Village
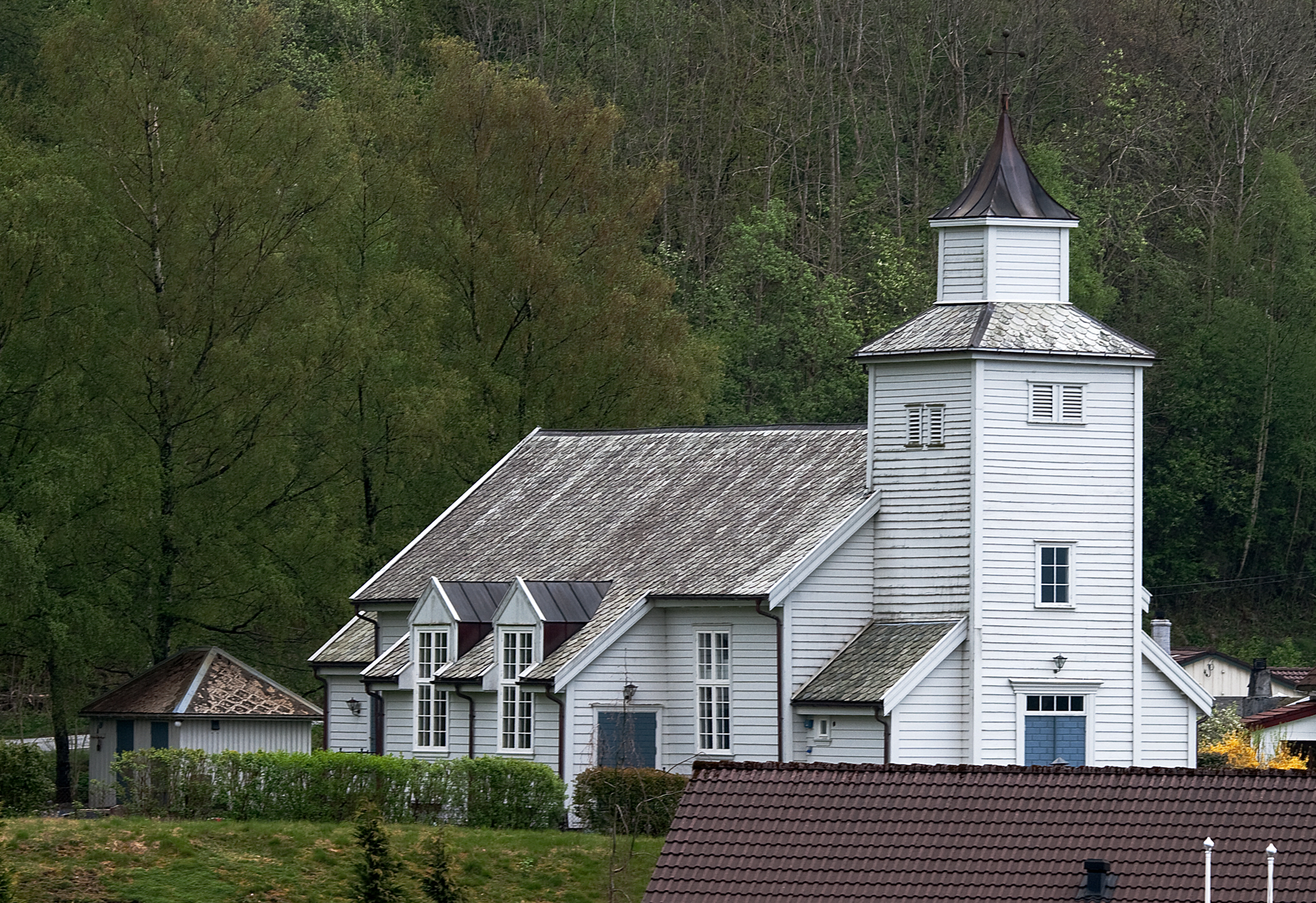
- View of the village church
- Interactive map of Hålandsosen
- Coordinates: 59.34829°N 6.2397°E
- Country: Norway
- Region: Western Norway
- County: Rogaland
- District: Ryfylke
- Municipality: Suldal Municipality
- Elevation: 7 m (23 ft)
- Time zone: UTC+01:00 (CET)
  - Summer (DST): UTC+02:00 (CEST)
- Post Code: 4233 Erfjord

Hålandsosen is a village in Suldal Municipality in Rogaland county, Norway. The village is located along the eastern shore of the Erfjorden, about 13 kilometres (8.1 mi) east of the village of Jelsa and about 15 kilometres (9.3 mi) south of the municipal centre of Sand. The Norwegian National Road 13 runs through the village, and the Erfjord Bridge lies just north of the village (it is the only bridge over the Erfjorden).

== History ==
The village was the administrative centre of the old Erfjord Municipality which existed from 1914 until 1965. The village is also the site of the historic Erfjord Church.
