= Nesflaten Chapel =

Church in Rogaland, Norway

- Nesflaten kapell
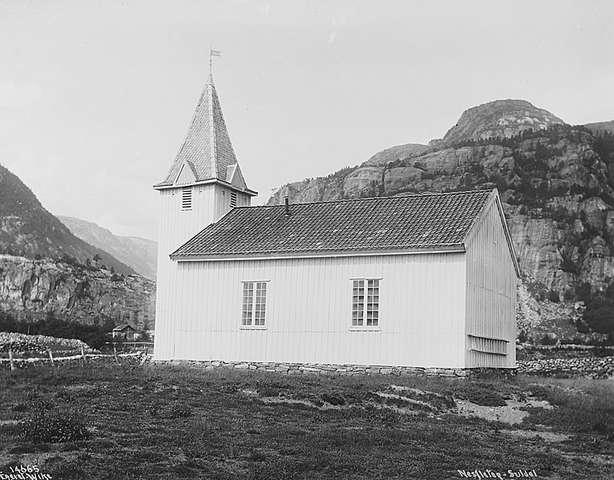
- View of the church (c. 1912)
- Nesflaten Chapel
- 59.64523°N 06.80658°E
- Location: Suldal Municipality, Rogaland
- Country: Norway
- Denomination: Church of Norway
- Churchmanship: Evangelical Lutheran

History
- Status: Parish church
- Founded: 1853
- Consecrated: 4 Sept 1853

Architecture
- Functional status: Active
- Architect: Hans Linstow
- Architectural type: Long church
- Completed: 1853

Specifications
- Capacity: 150
- Materials: Wood

Administration
- Diocese: Stavanger bispedømme
- Deanery: Ryfylke prosti
- Parish: Suldal
- Norwegian Cultural Heritage Site
- Type: Church
- Status: Not protected
- ID: 85119

Nesflaten Chapel (Norwegian: Nesflaten kapell) is a parish church of the Church of Norway in Suldal Municipality in Rogaland county, Norway. It is located in the village of Nesflaten. It is one of the two churches for the Suldal parish which is part of the Ryfylke prosti (deanery) in the Diocese of Stavanger. The white, wooden church was built in a long church design in 1853 using designs by the architect Hans Linstow. The church seats about 150 people.

== History ==
A cemetery was built in Nesflaten for the upper Suldalen valley in 1848. A church was built by the cemetery in 1852-1853 by the people who lived in that area. The chapel was consecrated on 4 September 1853. Initially, the chapel was privately owned and paid for by the residents of the area. In 1900, the municipality took over the chapel. The chapel has a tower on the west end of the building with a choir on the east end that is the same width and height of the nave. Later, a smaller sacristy was built on the east end of the choir.

== See also ==
- List of churches in Rogaland
