= Suldalsosen =

Village in Suldal Municipality, Norway

- Village
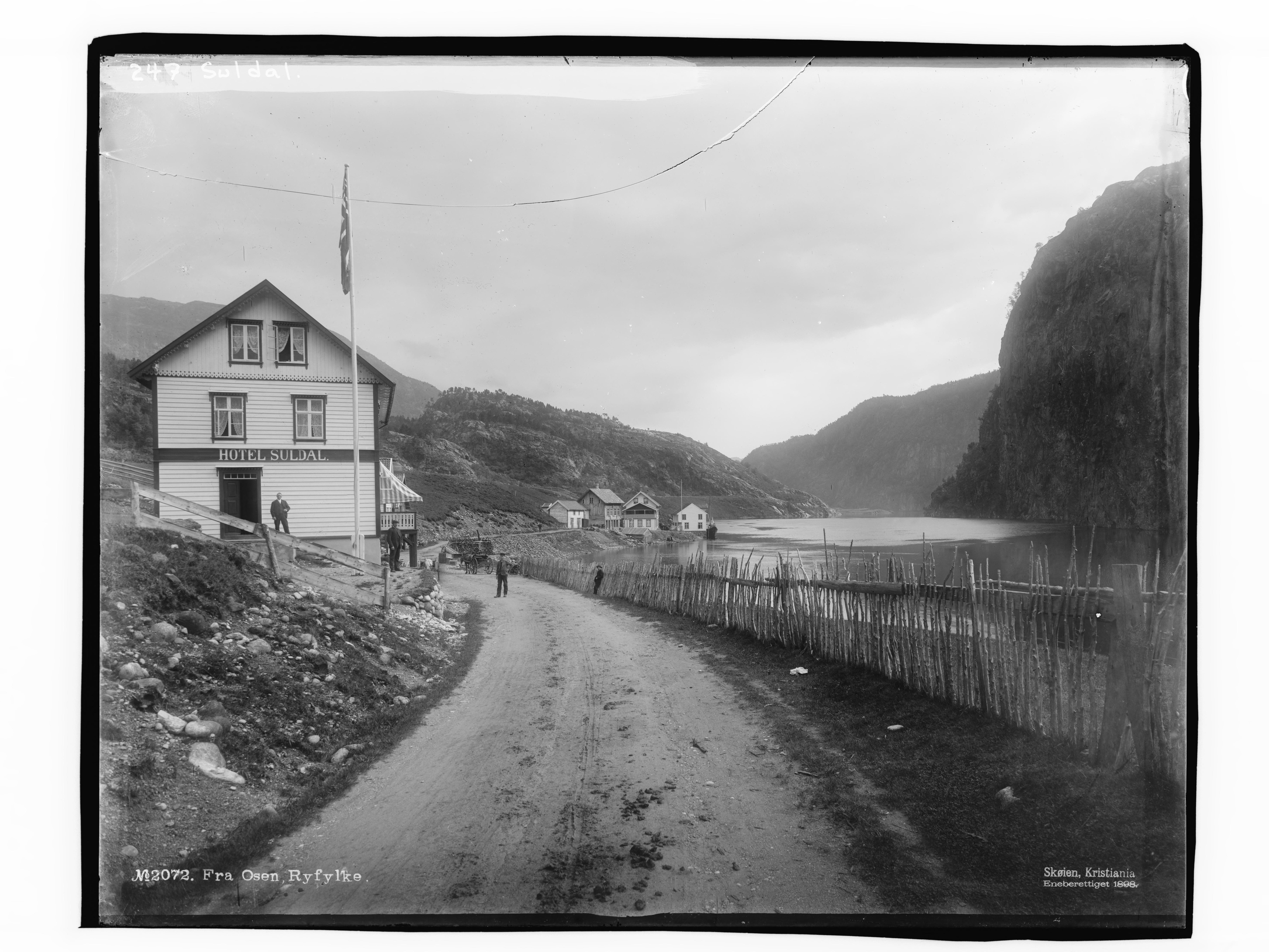
- View of the village (1898)
- Interactive map of Suldalsosen
- Coordinates: 59.49305°N 6.51921°E
- Country: Norway
- Region: Western Norway
- County: Rogaland
- District: Ryfylke
- Municipality: Suldal Municipality
- Elevation: 68 m (223 ft)
- Time zone: UTC+01:00 (CET)
  - Summer (DST): UTC+02:00 (CEST)
- Post Code: 4237 Suldalsosen

Suldalsosen is a village in Suldal Municipality in Rogaland county, Norway. The village is located along the northern shore of the river Suldalslågen on the southwestern end of the lake Suldalsvatnet.

The main administrative offices of Statkraft's Ulla-Førre hydropower plants are located in Suldalsosen. The village also has two stores, a hairdresser shop, petrol stations, a school, a kindergarten, a nursing home, and Suldal Church. The western part of the village area is sometimes referred to as Vinje or Vinjar.

== History ==
Suldalsosen historically was a central starting point for boat traffic on the lake Suldalsvatnet. The village was the administrative centre of Suldal Municipality prior to 1965 when the municipality was greatly expanded and the administration was moved to Sand.
