= Hylsfjorden =

Fjord in Rogaland, Norway

- Hylsfjord (unofficial)
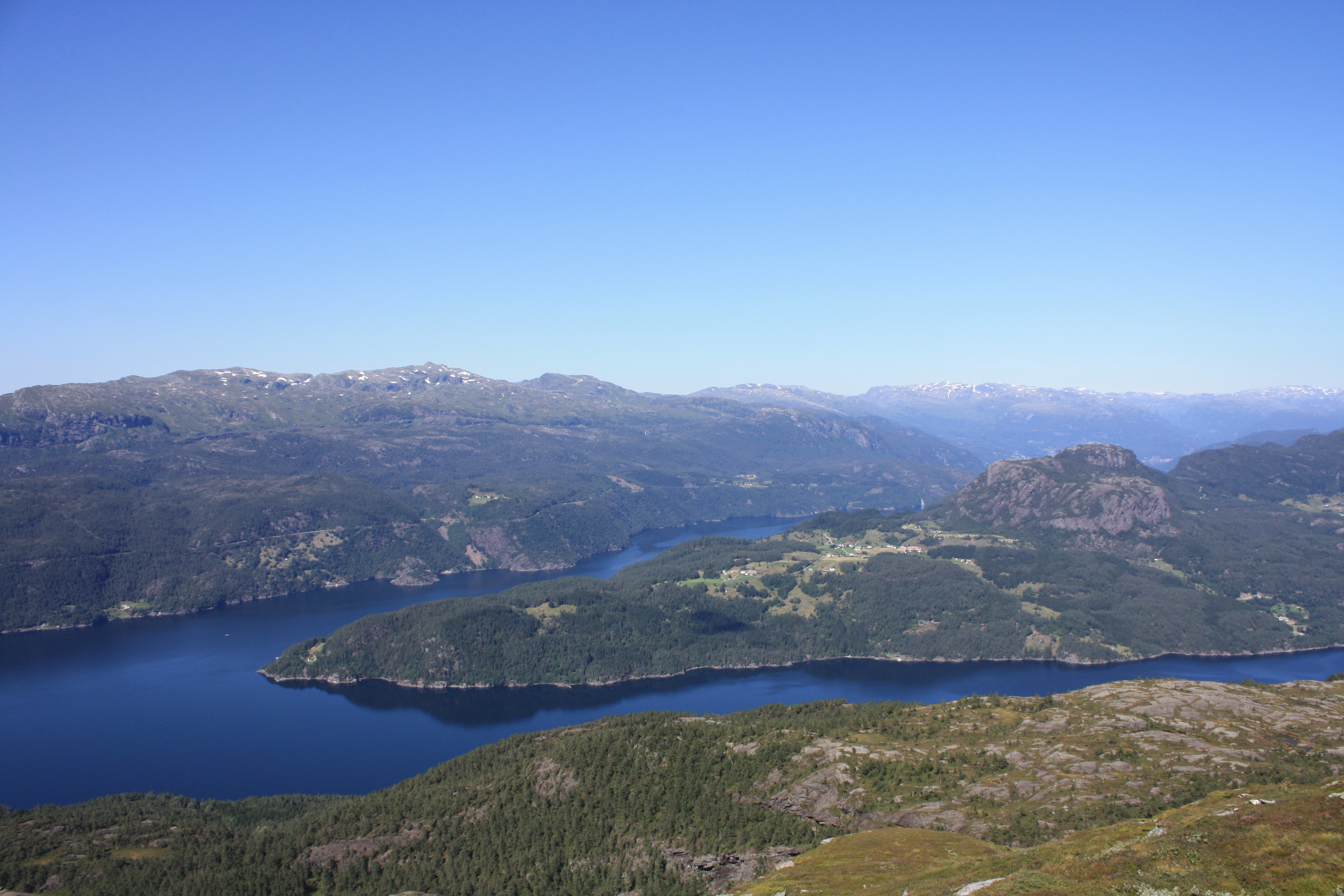
- View of the fjord in the foreground and the Saudafjorden in the background
- Interactive map of the fjord
- Location: Rogaland county, Norway
- Coordinates: 59.54415°N 6.40971°E
- Type: Fjord
- Primary outflows: Sandsfjorden
- Basin countries: Norway
- Max. length: 20 kilometres (12 mi)

Hylsfjorden is a fjord in Suldal Municipality in Rogaland county, Norway. The 20-kilometre (12 mi) long fjord runs from the small area of Hylen to the west. It ends just north of the village of Sand where it joins the Saudafjorden and together they form the Sandsfjorden, an inner branch of the Boknafjorden. The 160-megawatt (210,000 hp) Hylen Hydroelectric Power Station is located in the inner end of Hylsfjord. The fjord has relatively little development along its shores, only a few small hamlets, with Vanvik being the largest.

== See also ==
- List of Norwegian fjords
