= Mælen =

Mountain in Rogaland, Norway

- Melsnuten (unofficial)

Highest point
- Elevation: 1,574 m (5,164 ft)
- Prominence: 223 m (732 ft)
- Parent peak: Trollaskeinuten
- Isolation: 5.6 km (3.5 mi)
- Coordinates: 59°41′46″N 6°55′41″E

Geography
- Location: Rogaland, Norway

Mælen is a mountain in Suldal Municipality in Rogaland county, Norway. The 1,574-metre (5,164 ft) tall mountain lies in the northeastern part of the municipality, about 8.5 kilometres (5.3 mi) northeast of the village of Nesflaten. The mountain Trollaskeinuten lies just to the northeast of Mælen.
