= Marvik =

Village in Suldal Municipality, Norway

- Village
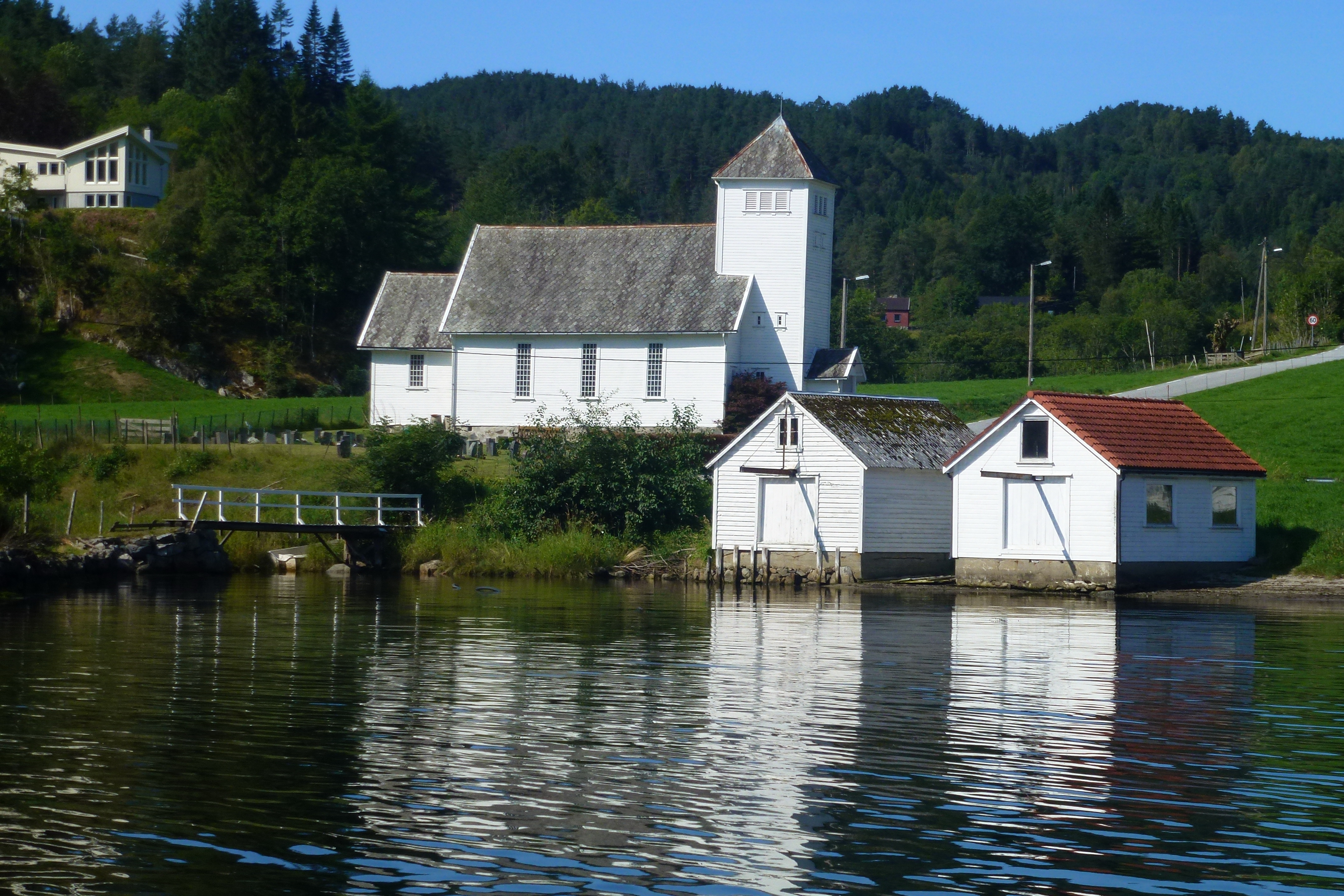
- View of the village chapel
- Interactive map of Marvik
- Coordinates: 59.4124°N 6.07938°E
- Country: Norway
- Region: Western Norway
- County: Rogaland
- District: Ryfylke
- Municipality: Suldal Municipality
- Elevation: 43 m (141 ft)
- Time zone: UTC+01:00 (CET)
  - Summer (DST): UTC+02:00 (CEST)
- Post Code: 4235 Hebnes

Marvik is a village in Suldal Municipality in Rogaland county, Norway. The village is located along the Sandsfjorden on the southern coast of the Ropeid peninsula. The village serves as a commercial centre of the peninsula, having a general store, primary school, marina, library, and Marvik Chapel.

The Sandsfjord Bridge (opened in 2016) is located a short distance east of Marvik. This bridge gives residents of Marvik a 20-kilometre (12 mi) long, ferry-free route to the municipal centre of Sand (without the bridge, it used to be a 120 kilometres (75 mi) drive around several fjords to reach Sand without using a ferry).
