= Marvik Chapel =

Church in Rogaland, Norway

- Marvik kapell
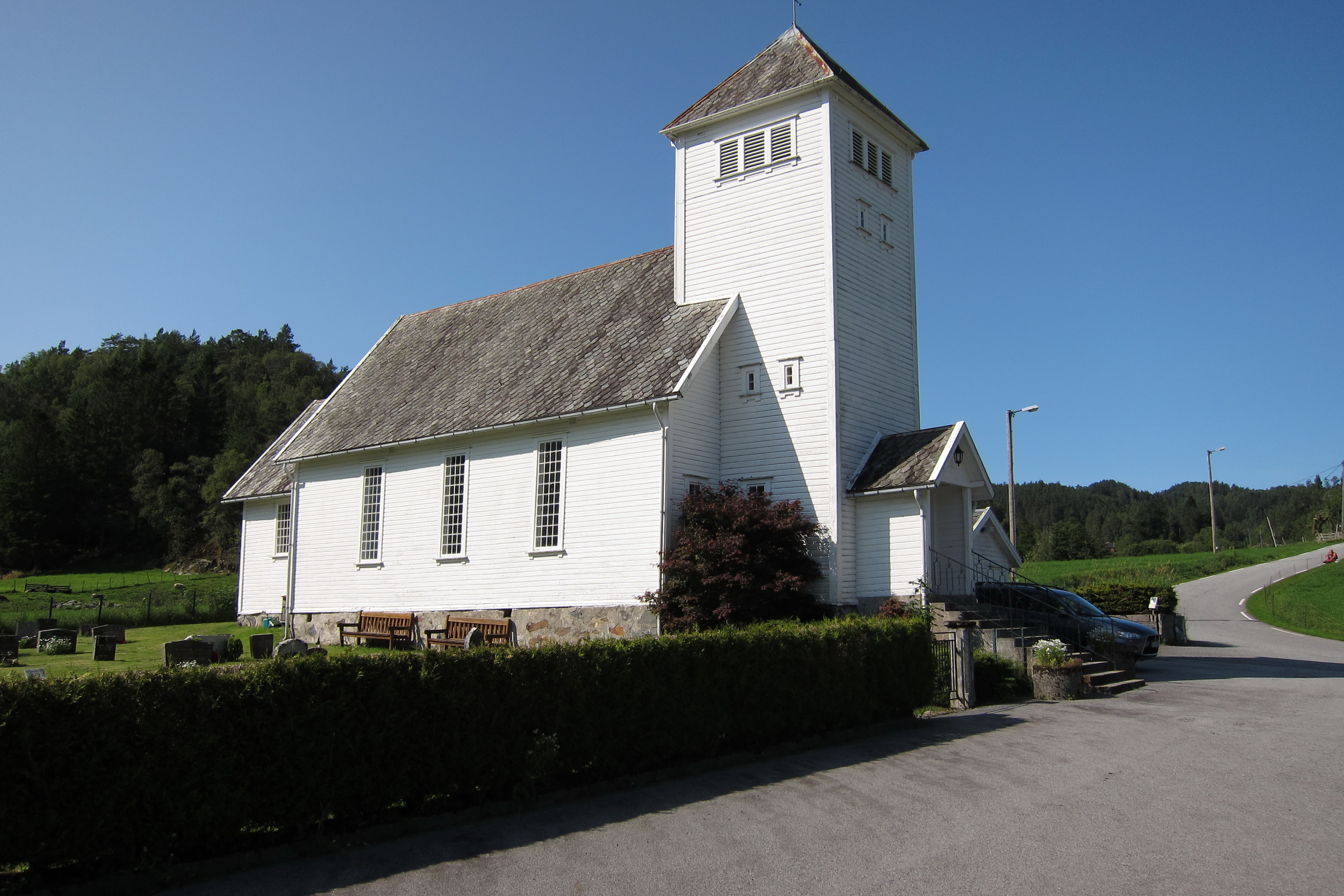
- View of the chapel
- Marvik Chapel
- 59.410210°N 06.079680°E
- Location: Suldal Municipality, Rogaland
- Country: Norway
- Denomination: Church of Norway
- Churchmanship: Evangelical Lutheran

History
- Status: Chapel
- Founded: 1920
- Consecrated: 1920

Architecture
- Functional status: Active
- Architect: Johannes Westbye
- Architectural type: Long church
- Completed: 1920

Specifications
- Capacity: 120
- Materials: Wood

Administration
- Diocese: Stavanger bispedømme
- Deanery: Ryfylke prosti
- Parish: Sand

Marvik Chapel (Norwegian: Marvik kapell) is a chapel of the Church of Norway in Suldal Municipality in Rogaland county, Norway. It is located in the village of Marvik. It is an annex chapel in the Sand parish which is part of the Ryfylke prosti (deanery) in the Diocese of Stavanger. The white, wooden chapel was built in a long church style in 1920 using designs by the architect Johannes Thorvaldsen Westbye. The chapel seats about 120 people.

== Media gallery ==
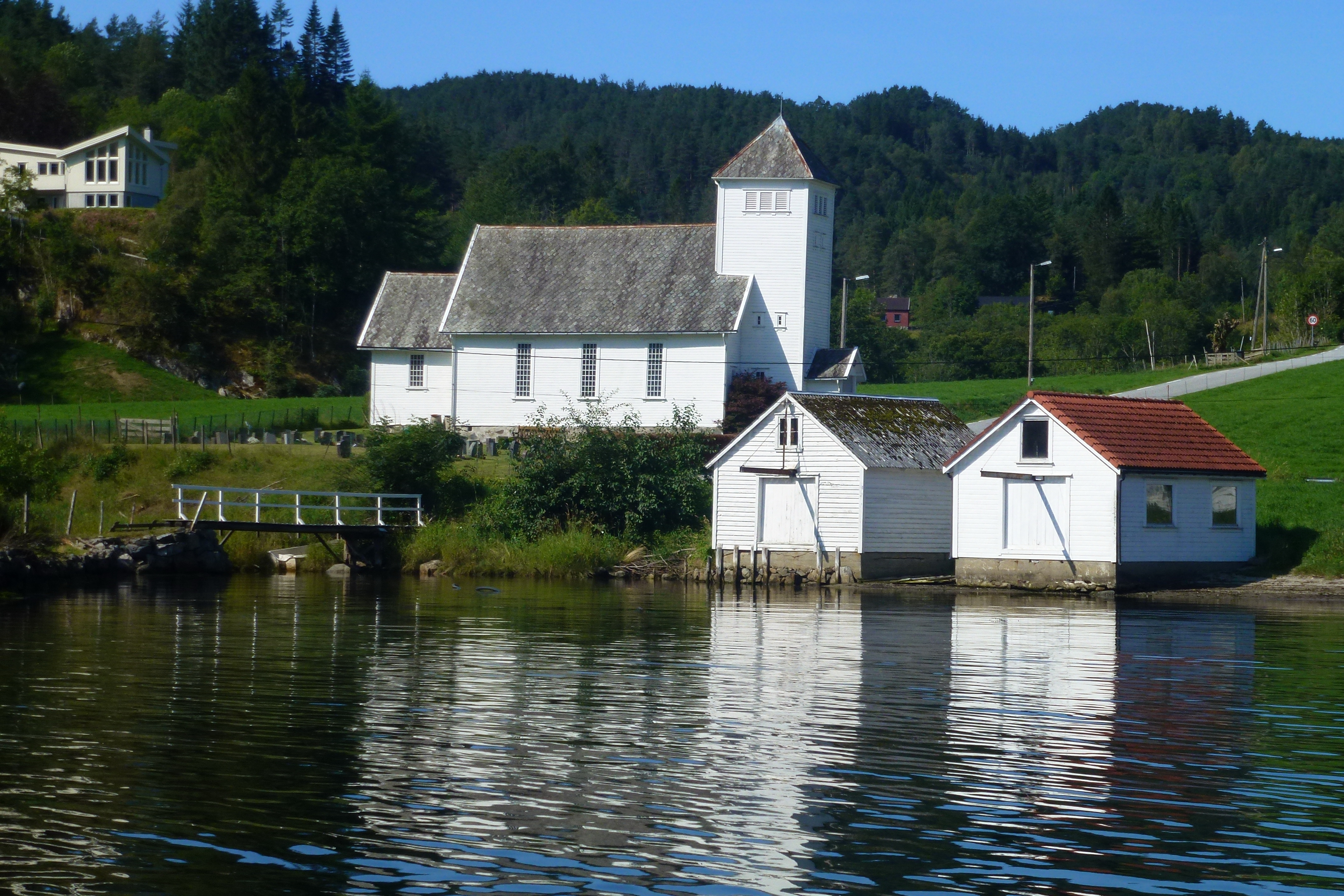

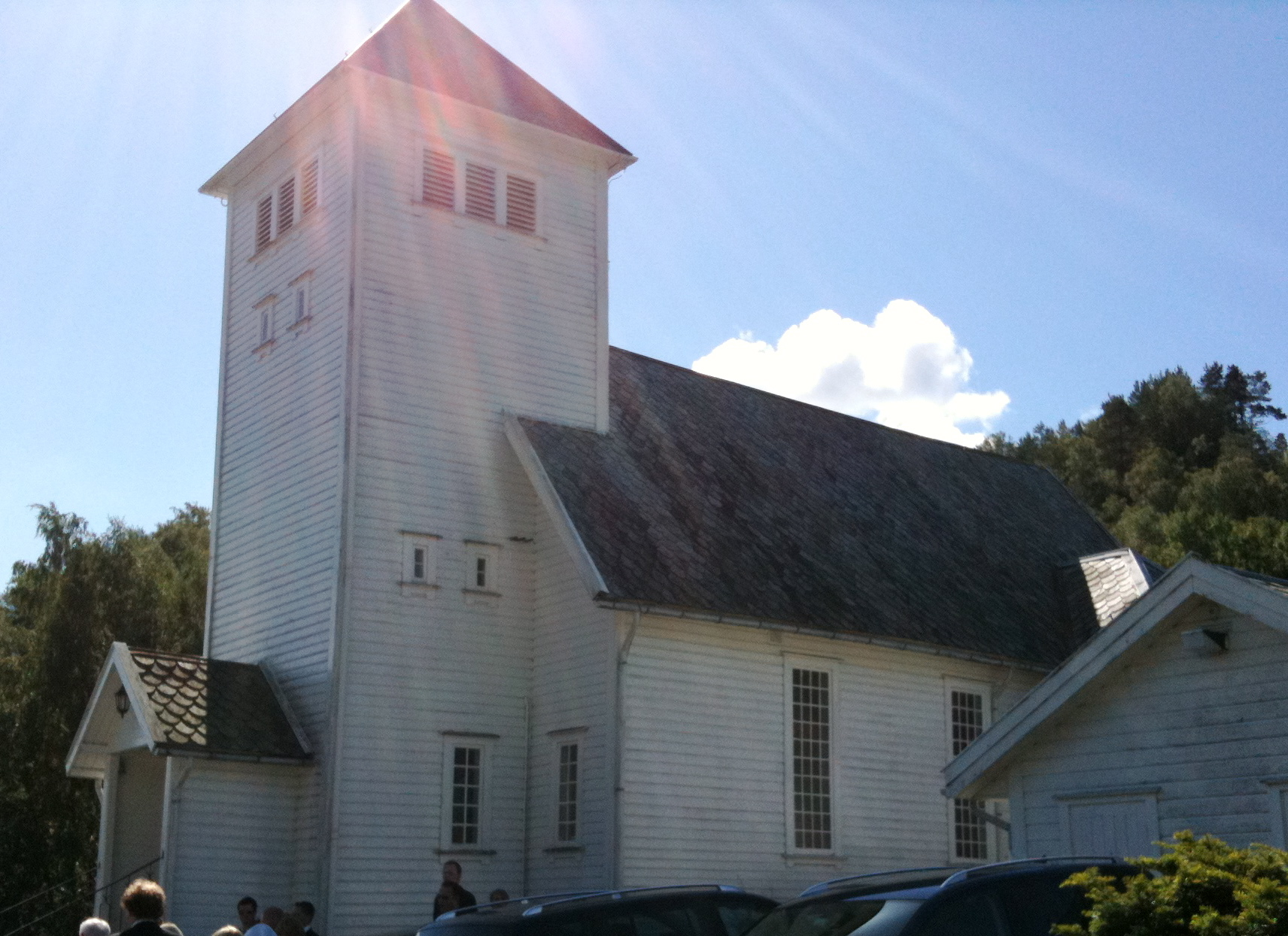

== See also ==
- List of churches in Rogaland
