= Erfjorden =

Fjord in Rogaland, Norway

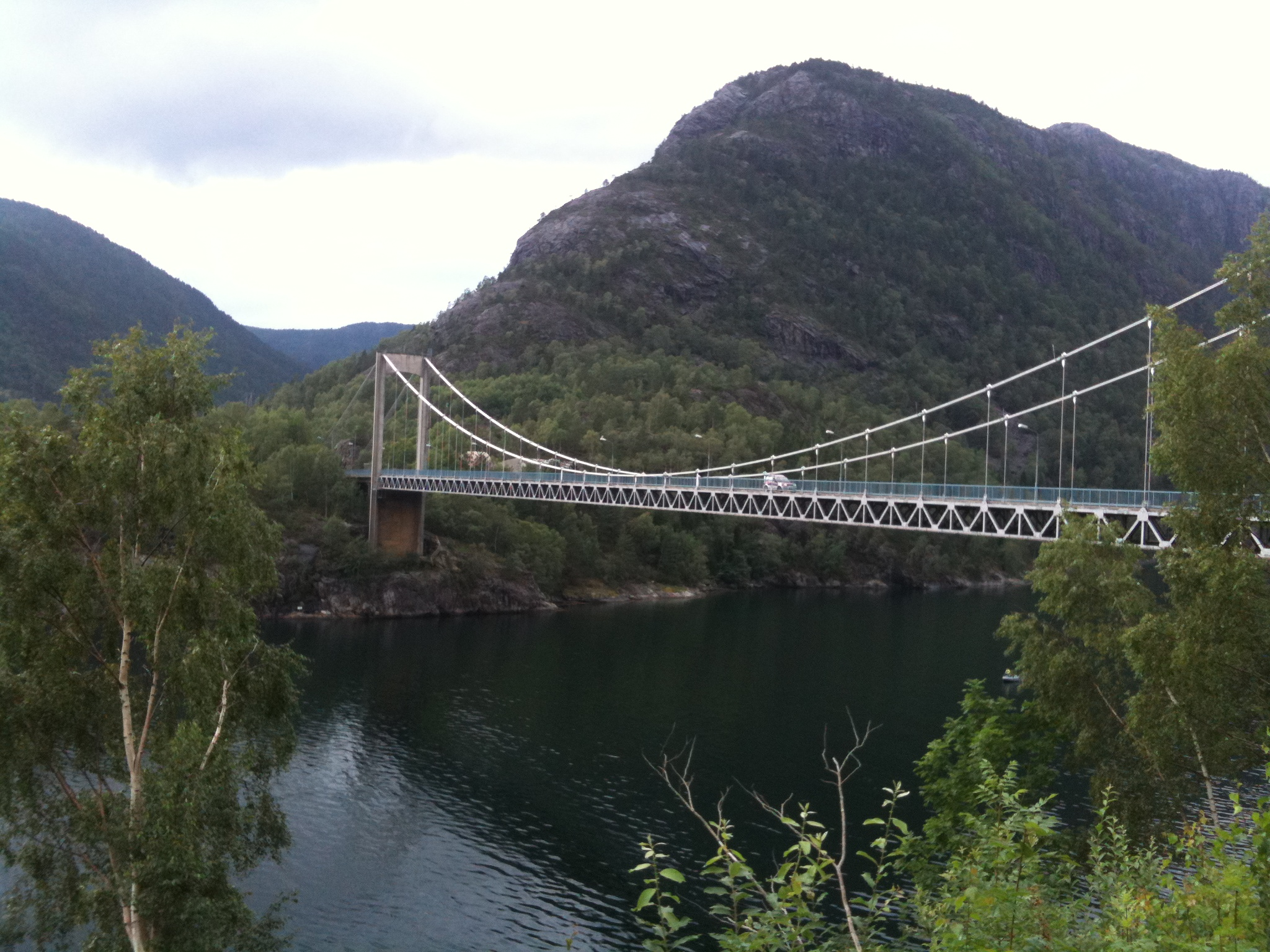
- View of the fjord and the Erfjord Bridge
- Interactive map of the fjord
- Location: Rogaland county, Norway
- Coordinates: 59.3106°N 6.1753°E
- Type: Fjord
- Basin countries: Norway
- Max. length: 16 kilometres (9.9 mi)

Erfjorden is a fjord in Suldal Municipality and Hjelmeland Municipality in Rogaland county, Norway. The 16-kilometre (9.9 mi) long fjord begins at the small village of Tysse in Suldal Municipality and heads south past the village of Hålandsosen before making a sharp turn to the west before emptying into the larger Nedstrandsfjorden. The Erfjord Bridge crosses the fjord, just north of Hålandsosen. The innermost part of the fjord (north of the bridge) is sometimes referred to as the Tyssefjorden.

== See also ==
- List of Norwegian fjords
