= Steinkilenuten =

Mountain in Rogaland, Norway

Highest point
- Elevation: 1,434 m (4,705 ft)
- Prominence: 112 m (367 ft)
- Isolation: 2.1 km (1.3 mi)
- Coordinates: 59°30′24″N 6°56′48″E

Geography
- Location: Rogaland, Norway

Steinkilenuten is a mountain in Suldal Municipality in Rogaland county, Norway. The 1,434-metre (4,705 ft) mountain lies about 20 kilometres (12 mi) southeast of the village of Nesflaten and just southwest of the mountain Kaldafjellet.

== See also ==
- List of mountains of Norway
