= Erfjord Church =

Church in Rogaland, Norway

- Erfjord kyrkje
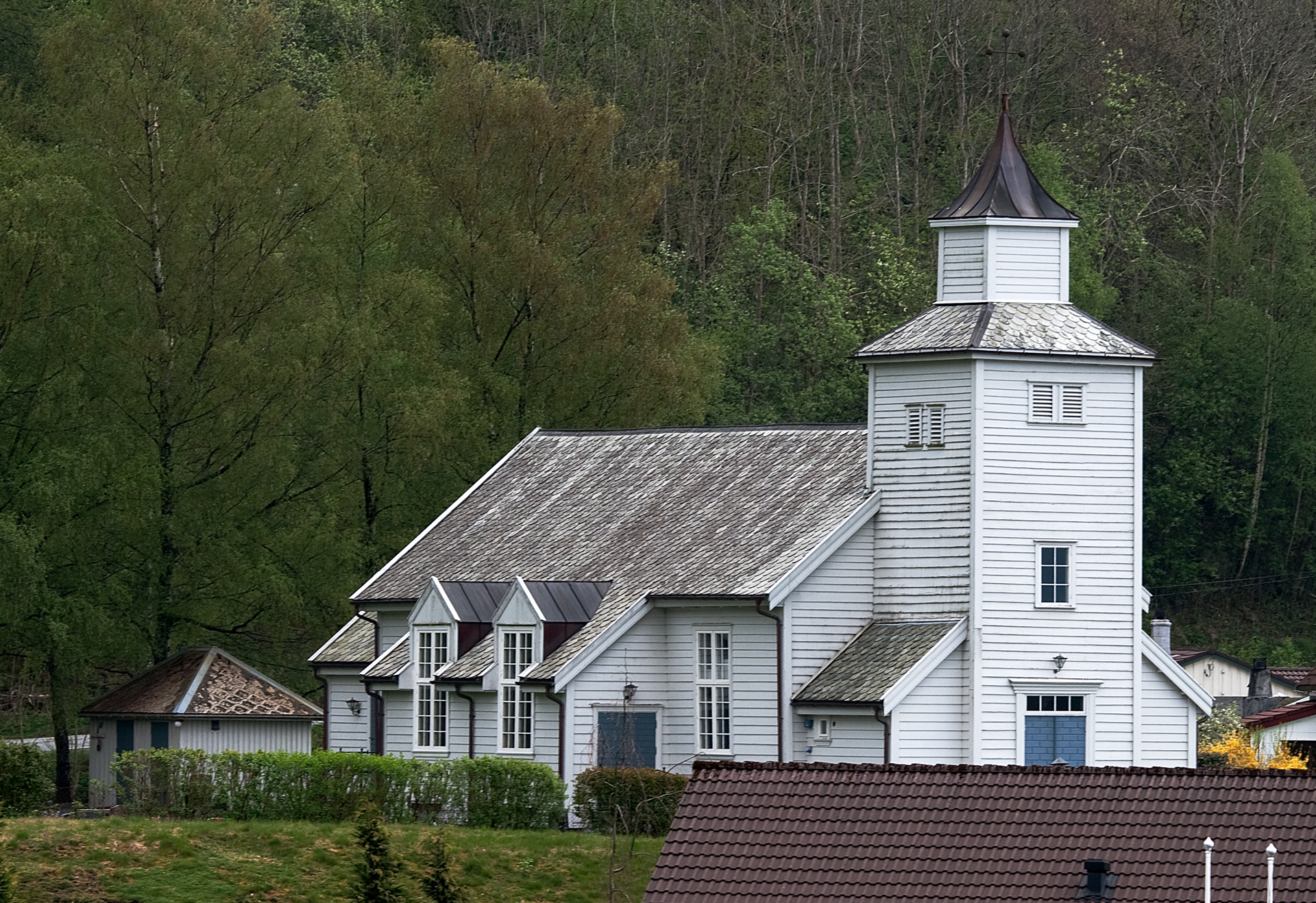
- View of the church
- Erfjord Church
- 59.347156°N 06.239353°E
- Location: Suldal Municipality, Rogaland
- Country: Norway
- Denomination: Church of Norway
- Churchmanship: Evangelical Lutheran

History
- Status: Parish church
- Founded: 1877
- Consecrated: 1877

Architecture
- Functional status: Active
- Architect: T. Tengesdal
- Architectural type: Long church
- Completed: 1877

Specifications
- Capacity: 180
- Materials: Wood

Administration
- Diocese: Stavanger bispedømme
- Deanery: Ryfylke prosti
- Parish: Erfjord
- Norwegian Cultural Heritage Site
- Type: Church
- Status: Not protected
- ID: 84102

Erfjord Church (Norwegian: Erfjord kyrkje) is a parish church of the Church of Norway in Suldal Municipality in Rogaland county, Norway. It is located in the village of Hålandsosen. It is the church for the Erfjord parish which is part of the Ryfylke prosti (deanery) in the Diocese of Stavanger. The white, wooden church was built in a long church design in 1877 using designs by the architect T. Tengesdal. The church seats about 180 people.

== See also ==
- List of churches in Rogaland
