= Erfjord Bridge =

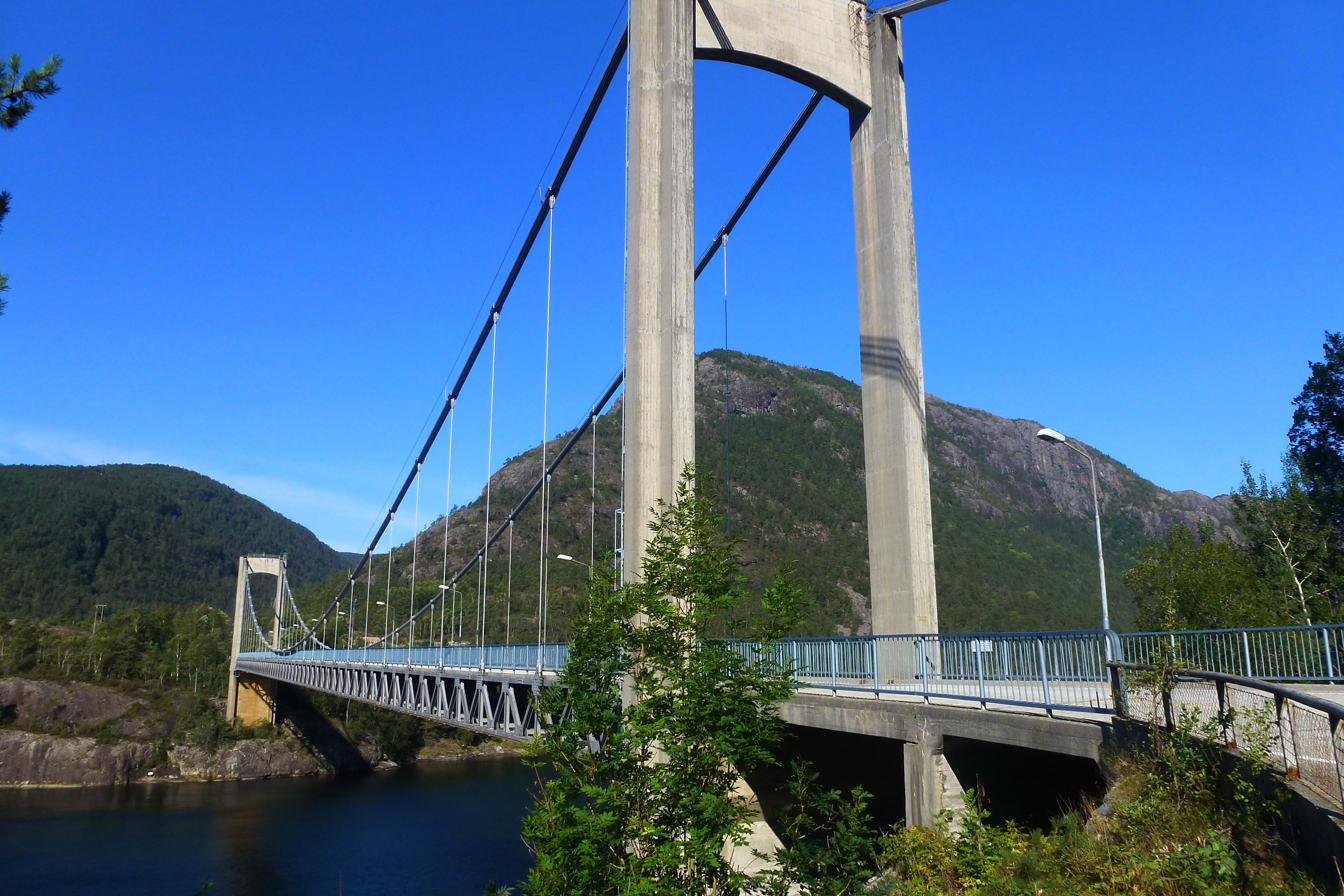
- View of the bridge
- Coordinates: 59.3548°N 6.2297°E
- Carries: Rv13
- Crosses: Erfjorden
- Locale: Suldal Municipality, Rogaland

Characteristics
- Design: Suspension bridge
- Material: Concrete and Steel
- Total length: 294 metres (965 ft)
- Longest span: 228 metres (748 ft)
- No. of spans: 3
- Piers in water: 0
- Clearance below: 23 metres (75 ft)

History
- Opened: November 1963

Location
- Interactive map of Erfjord Bridge

Erfjord Bridge (Norwegian: Erfjord bru) is a suspension bridge in Suldal Municipality in Rogaland county, Norway. The bridge was completed in November 1963 and it crosses the Erfjorden as part of the Norwegian National Road 13, a main road between the cities of Bergen and Stavanger in Western Norway.

The concrete and steel bridge has a total length of 294 metres (965 ft) which is made up of three spans, the longest span measuring 228 metres (748 ft). The sailing clearance below the bridge is 23 metres (75 ft).
