= Sandsfjorden =

Fjord in Rogaland, Norway

- Sandsfjord (unofficial)
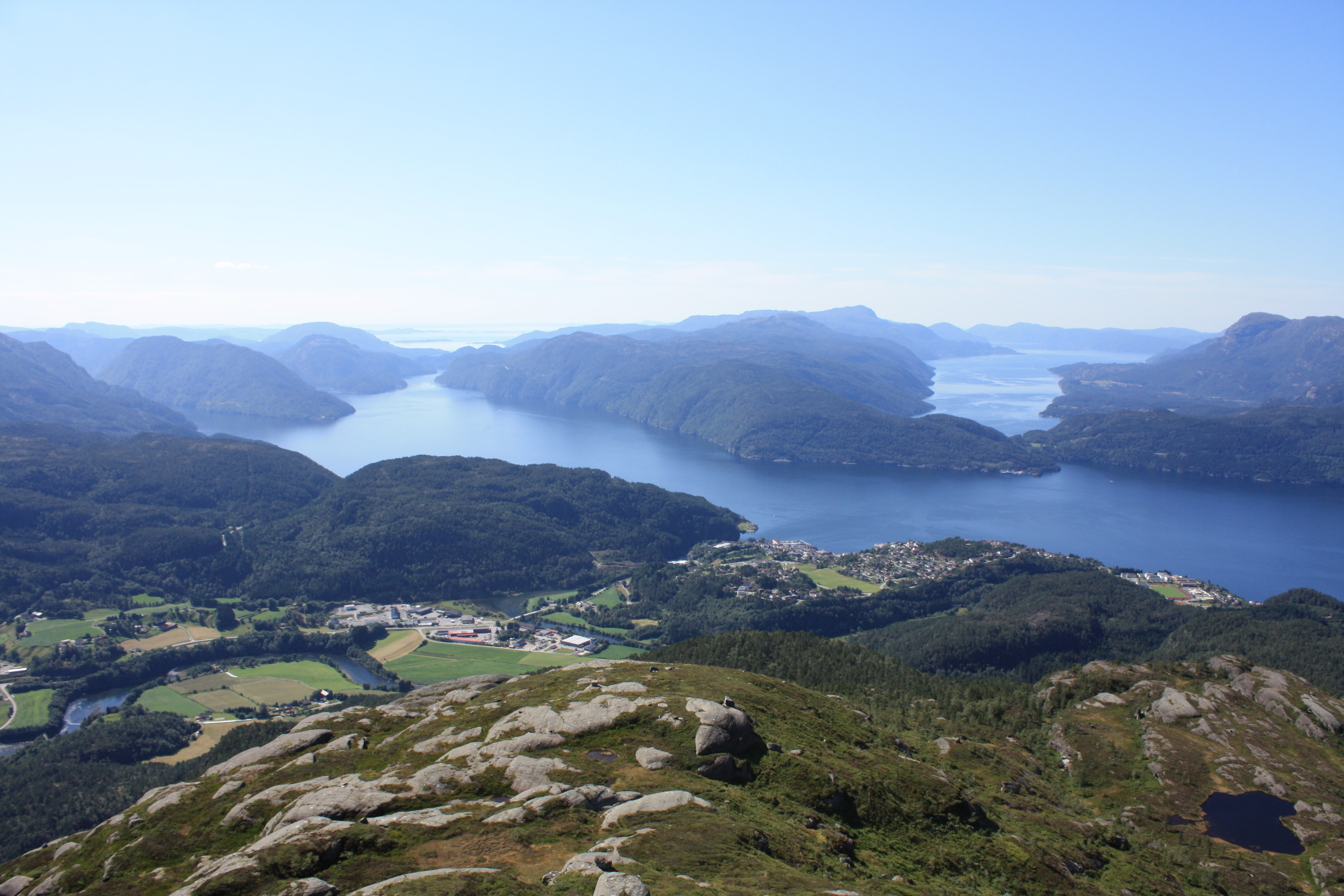
- View of the fjord and the village of Sand
- Interactive map of the fjord
- Location: Rogaland county, Norway
- Coordinates: 59.40733°N 6.12566°E
- Type: Fjord
- Primary inflows: Saudafjorden and Hylsfjorden
- Primary outflows: Boknafjorden
- Basin countries: Norway
- Max. length: 25 kilometres (16 mi)

Sandsfjorden is a fjord in Suldal Municipality in Rogaland county, Norway. The 25-kilometre (16 mi) long fjord is the northernmost arm of main Boknafjorden in Rogaland county. It begins at the confluence of the Saudafjorden and Hylsfjorden, just north of the village of Sand and travels to the southwest reaching the island of Foldøyna, where the fjord joins the main Boknafjorden. The villages of Jelsa and Hebnes are located on either side of the mouth of the fjord.

The Sandsfjord Bridge, which opened in the fall of 2015, crosses the fjord near the village of Marvik and connects the Norwegian National Road 13 to the Norwegian County Road 46. It replaced a ferry route that ran across the fjord from Ropeid to Sand.

== See also ==
- List of Norwegian fjords
