= Fitjanuten =

Mountain in Norway

Highest point
- Elevation: 1,504 m (4,934 ft)
- Prominence: 141 m (463 ft)
- Parent peak: Vassdalseggi
- Isolation: 5.5 km (3.4 mi)
- Coordinates: 59°42′50″N 7°06′59″E

Geography
- Location: Rogaland and Telemark, Norway

Fitjanuten is a mountain in southern Norway. The 1,504-metre (4,934 ft) tall mountain lies on the border of Suldal Municipality (in Rogaland county) and Vinje Municipality (in Telemark county). The mountain lies just north of the lake Holmavatnet and about 5 kilometres (3.1 mi) south of the mountain Vassdalseggi.
