= Suldal Municipality =

Municipality in Rogaland, Norway

Suldal Municipality Suldal kommune
- Municipality
- Suledal herred (historic name)
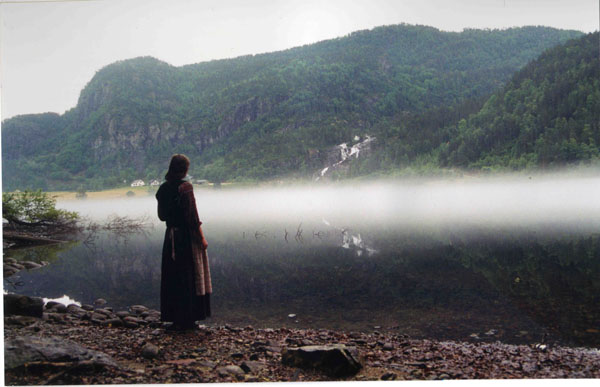
- View of the lake Suldalsvatnet

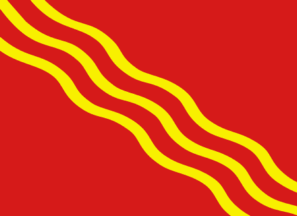
- Flag Coat of arms

- Rogaland within Norway

- Suldal within Rogaland
- Coordinates: 59°28′06″N 06°29′59″E
- Country: Norway
- County: Rogaland
- District: Ryfylke
- Established: 1 Jan 1838
  - Created as: Formannskapsdistrikt
- Administrative centre: Sand

Government
  - Mayor (2023): Mads Drange (Ap)

Area
  - Total: 1,736.28 km^{2} (670.38 sq mi)
  - Land: 1,581.96 km^{2} (610.80 sq mi)
  - Water: 154.32 km^{2} (59.58 sq mi) 8.9%
  - Rank: #46 in Norway
- Highest elevation: 1,658.34 m (5,440.7 ft)

Population (2026)
  - Total: 3,891
  - Rank: #208 in Norway
  - Density: 2.2/km^{2} (5.7/sq mi)
  - Change (10 years): ▼ −0.3%
- Demonym: Suldøl

Official language
  - Norwegian form: Nynorsk
- Time zone: UTC+01:00 (CET)
  - Summer (DST): UTC+02:00 (CEST)
- ISO 3166 code: NO-1134
- Website: Official website

Suldal is a municipality in the northeast corner of Rogaland county, Norway. It is located in the traditional district of Ryfylke. Since 1965, the administrative centre of Suldal is the village of Sand i Ryfylke (prior to that it was the village of Suldalsosen). Other villages in Suldal include Erfjord, Hålandsosen, Jelsa, Marvik, Nesflaten, Vanvik, and Suldalsosen.

The 1,736.28-square-kilometre (670.38 sq mi) municipality is the 46th largest by area out of the 357 municipalities in Norway. Suldal Municipality is the 208th most populous municipality in Norway with a population of 3,891. The municipality's population density is 2.2 inhabitants per square kilometre (5.7/sq mi) and its population has decreased by 0.3% over the previous 10-year period.

== General information ==
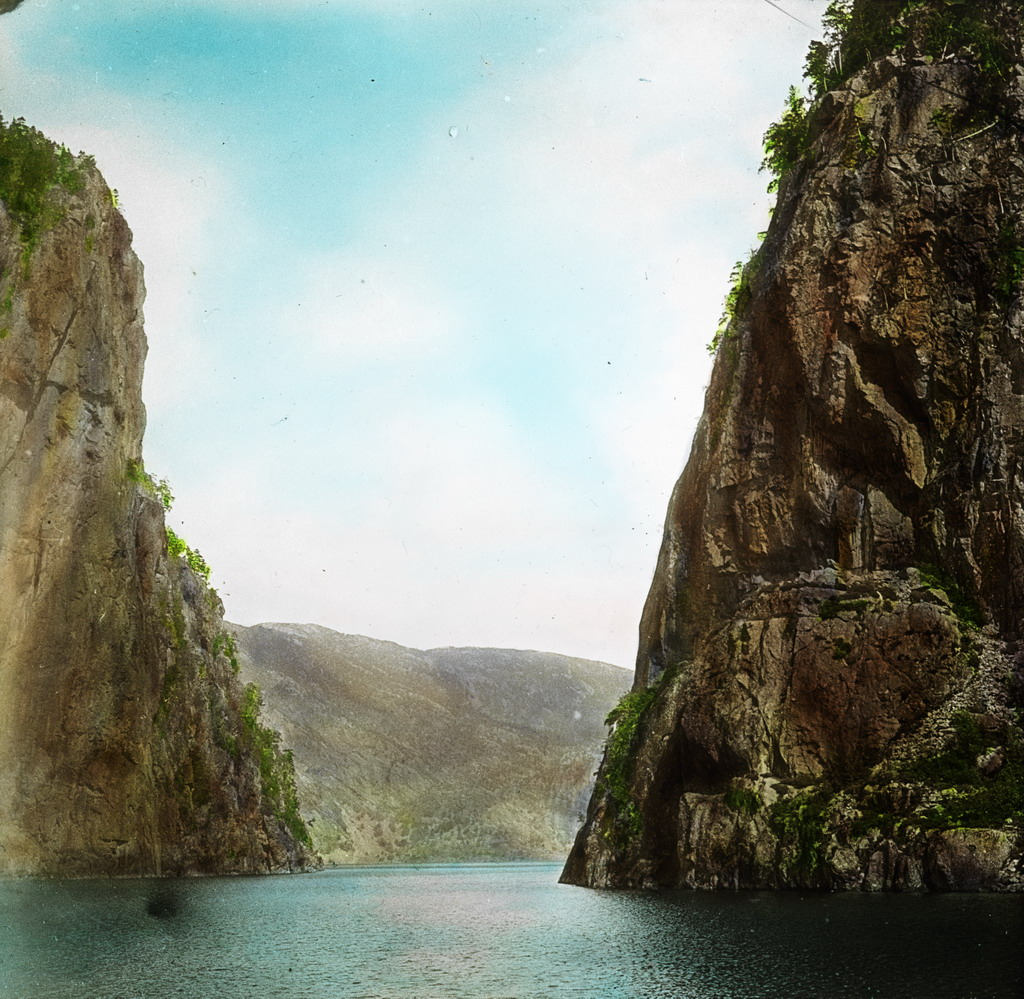
View of the Suldalsporten in the lake Suldalsvatnet

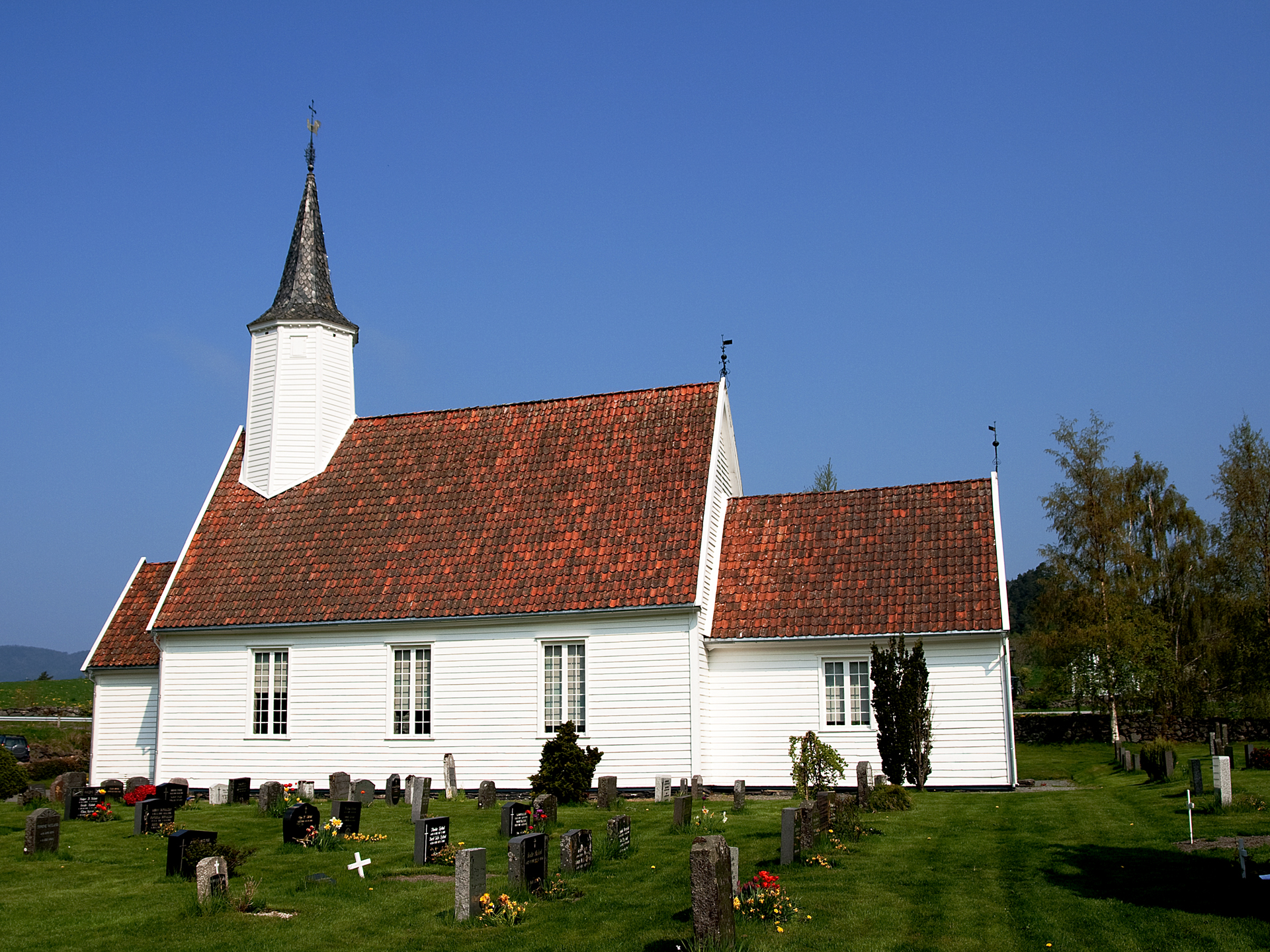
View of Jelsa Church

The parish of Suledal (later spelled Suldal) was established as a municipality on 1 January 1838 (see formannskapsdistrikt law). In 1842, Suledal Municipality was divided into two: the northern district (population: 1,584) became the new Søvde Municipality and the southern district (population: 2,030) remained as a smaller Suledal Municipality.

During the 1960s, there were many municipal mergers across Norway due to the work of the Schei Committee. On 1 January 1965, the following areas were merged to form a new, larger Suldal Municipality:

- all of Suldal Municipality (population: 1,412)
- all of Sand Municipality (population: 1,135)
- all of Erfjord Municipality (population: 610)
- most of Jelsa Municipality (population: 928), except for the areas of Jelsa located on the island of Ombo which became part of Finnøy Municipality and Hjelmeland Municipality
- the part of Imsland Municipality that was located south of the Vindafjorden (population: 61)

On 1 January 1978, the parts of Vindafjord Municipality located southeast of the Vindafjorden on the Ropeid peninsula (population: 13) was transferred to Suldal.

=== Name ===
The municipality (originally the parish) is named after the Suledalen valley (Old Norse: Súladalr) since it was a central geographical feature of the municipality. The first element is the plural genitive case of súla which means "pillar" or "column" (likely referring to the mountain pass Suldalsporten). The last element is dalr which means "valley" or "dale". Before 1891, the name was written "Suledal".

=== Coat of arms ===
The coat of arms was granted on 11 March 1976. The official blazon is "Gules, three bendlets wavy Or" (Norwegian: I raudt ein gull bølgjeforma trillingstreng, skråstilt høgre venstre). This means the arms have a red field (background) and the charge is a set of the three diagonal wavy lins. The charge has a tincture of Or which means it is commonly colored yellow, but if it is made out of metal, then gold is used. The lines represent the local river Suldalslågen which runs through the municipality. The arms were designed by Magnus Hardeland. The municipal flag has the same design as the coat of arms.

=== Churches ===
The Church of Norway has four parishes (sokn) within Suldal Municipality. It is part of the Ryfylke prosti (deanery) in the Diocese of Stavanger.

Churches in Suldal Municipality
Parish (sokn)	Church name	Location of the church	Year built
Erfjord	Erfjord Church	Hålandsosen	1877
Jelsa	Jelsa Church	Jelsa	1647
Sand	Sand Church	Sand	1853
Sand	Marvik Chapel	Marvik	1920
Suldal	Suldal Church	Suldalsosen	1852
Suldal	Nesflaten Chapel	Nesflaten	1853

== History ==
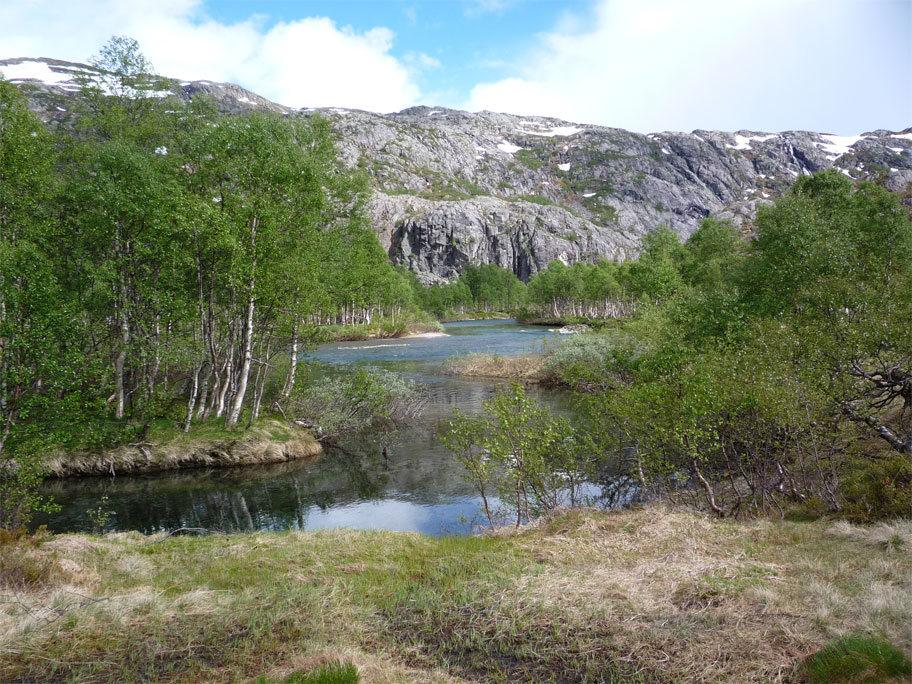
View of rural Suldal

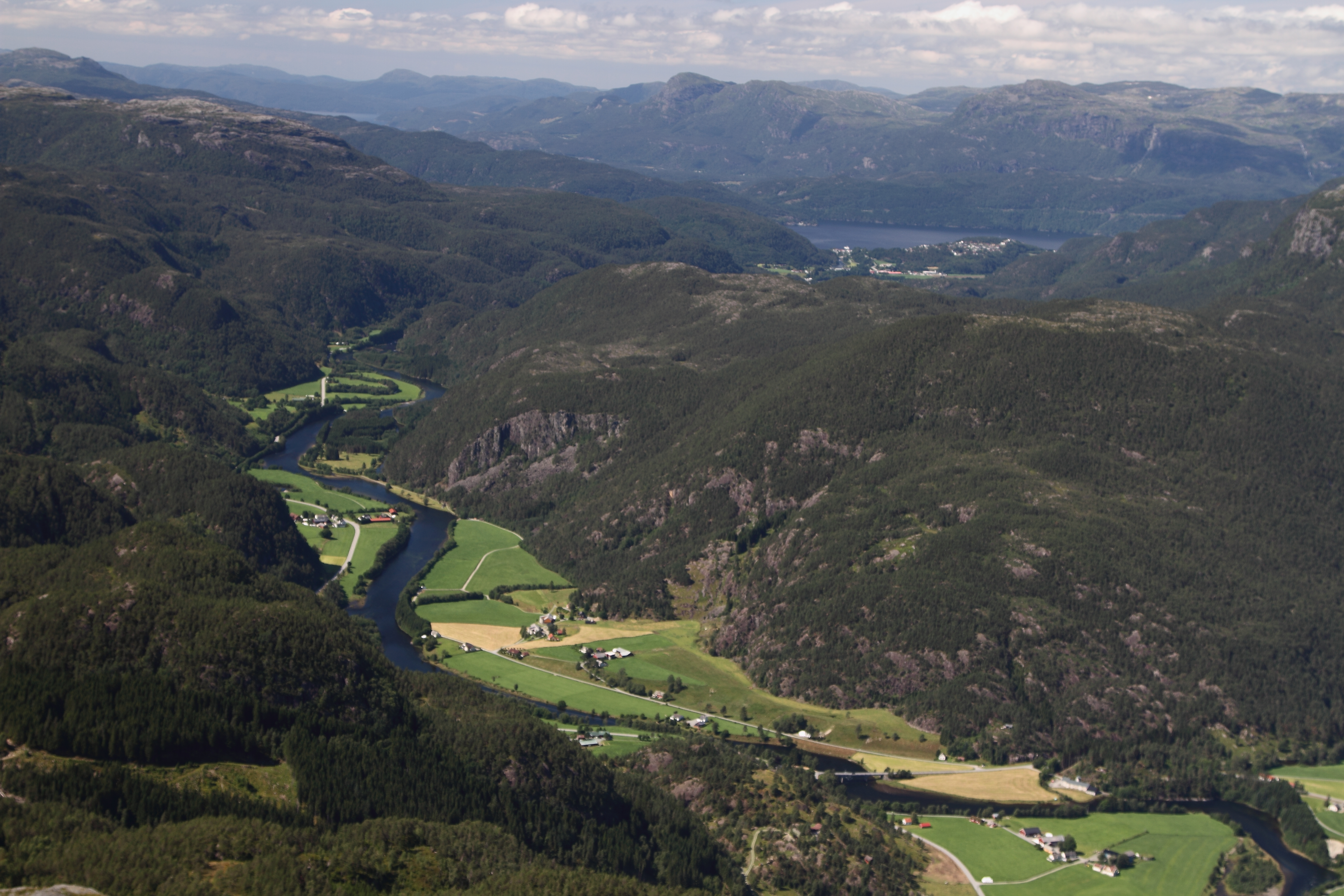
View of the Suldal valley (with Sand village at the top)

The area that is now Suldal Municipality has a long history of trade connections to the nearby valley regions to the north and east. The main mountain plateau trade route led east from Suldal municipality over the plateau to the nearby Setesdal valley in Bykle in Agder county. Another route led north from Suldal in Rogaland county through the Røldal area in Vestland county, and then east into Vinje in Telemark county. There has also been found Viking artefacts and graves in Suldal.

== Geography ==
At 1,736 square kilometres (670 sq mi), Suldal Municipality is the largest municipality in Rogaland county. The municipality borders three counties: Vestland (north), Telemark (northeast), and Agder (east). To the north, Suldal Municipality is bordered by Sauda Municipality and Ullensvang Municipality, in the east by Vinje Municipality and Bykle Municipality, in the south by Hjelmeland Municipality, and in the west by Vindafjord Municipality. Across the Jelsafjorden and Vindafjorden lie Stavanger Municipality and Tysvær Municipality.

The mountain Kistenuten is located at the triple border point of Rogaland, Vestland and Telemark. The highest point in the municipality (and in Rogaland county) is the 1,658.34-metre (5,440.7 ft) tall mountain Vassdalseggi, located on the border with Vinje Municipality in Telemark county. Other mountains in Suldal include Trollaskeinuten, Snønuten, Mælen, Knoda, Fitjanuten, Leirnuten, Kaldafjellet, Simlenuten, Steinkilenuten, and Raudberga, all reaching above 1,400 metres (4,600 ft) m.a.s.l.

The Sandsfjorden and Hylsfjorden lie within Suldal Municipality, as does lake Suldalsvatnet. The Saudafjorden lies partially within the boundary of the municipality. The Erfjorden and the lakes Blåsjø, Holmavatnet, and Holmevatnet also lie along the municipal boundary of Suldal.

== Economy ==
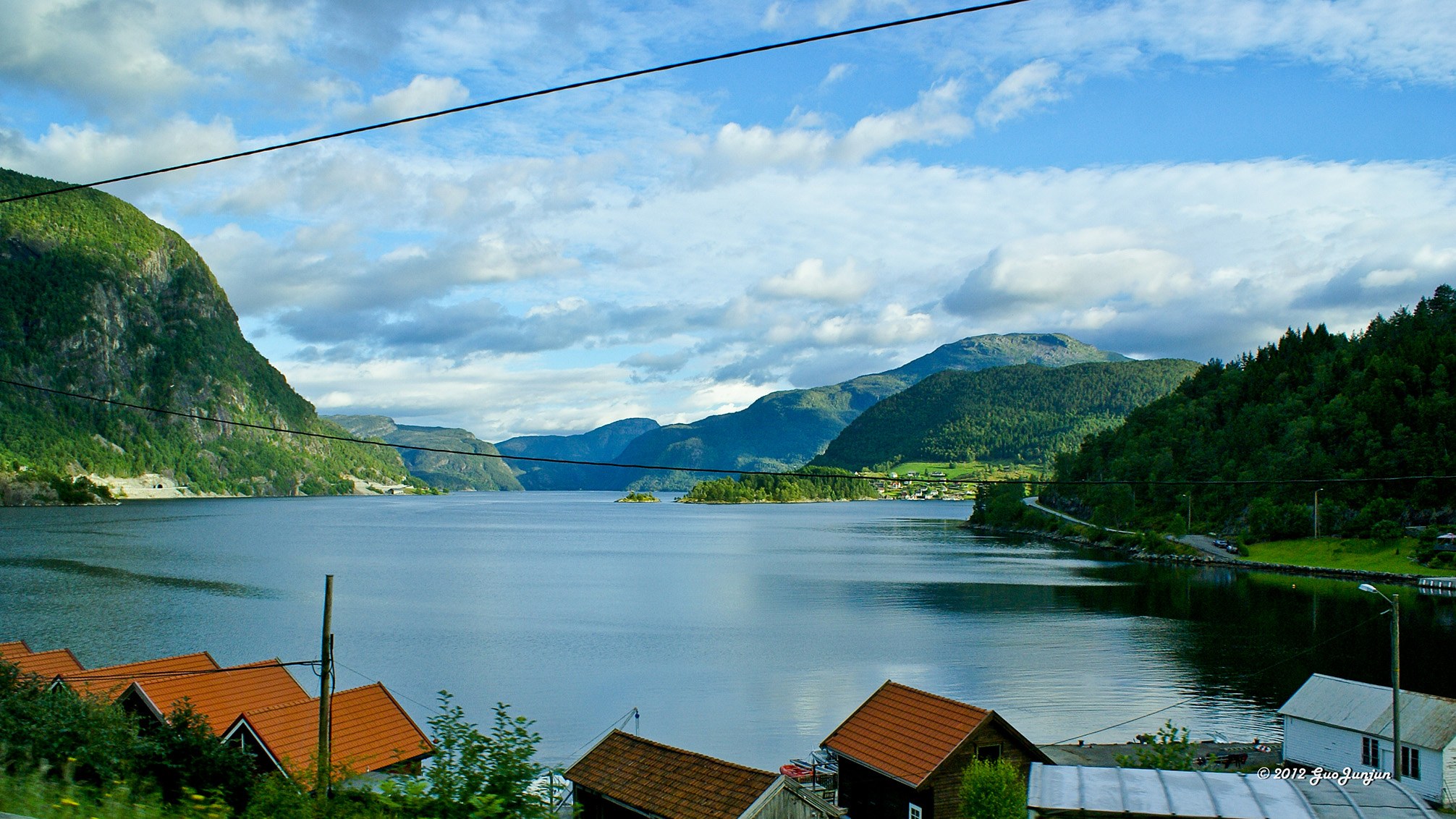
View of the Erfjorden

The Ulla-Førre project of building huge hydroelectric dams in the mountains was initiated in the 1960s. At times, the project employed over a thousand people. The finished hydroelectric complex has a total capacity of approximately 2,100 megawatts (2,800,000 hp) and produces about 4.8 terawatt-hours (17 PJ) yearly.

== Government ==
Suldal Municipality is responsible for primary education (through 10th grade), outpatient health services, senior citizen services, welfare and other social services, zoning, economic development, and municipal roads and utilities. The municipality is governed by a municipal council of directly elected representatives. The mayor is indirectly elected by a vote of the municipal council. The municipality is under the jurisdiction of the Haugaland og Sunnhordland District Court and the Gulating Court of Appeal.

=== Municipal council ===
The municipal council (Kommunestyre) of Suldal Municipality is made up of 19 representatives that are elected to four-year terms. The tables below show the current and historical composition of the council by political party.

Suldal kommunestyre 2023–2027
Party name (in Nynorsk)	Number of representatives
Labour Party (Arbeidarpartiet)	6
Conservative Party (Høgre)	2
Christian Democratic Party (Kristeleg Folkeparti)	2
Centre Party (Senterpartiet)	6
Socialist Left Party (Sosialistisk Venstreparti)	1
Liberal Party (Venstre)	2
Total number of members:	19

Suldal kommunestyre 2019–2023
Party name (in Nynorsk)	Number of representatives
Labour Party (Arbeidarpartiet)	3
Green Party (Miljøpartiet Dei Grøne)	1
Conservative Party (Høgre)	2
Christian Democratic Party (Kristeleg Folkeparti)	3
Centre Party (Senterpartiet)	8
Socialist Left Party (Sosialistisk Venstreparti)	1
Liberal Party (Venstre)	1
Total number of members:	19

Suldal kommunestyre 2015–2019
Party name (in Nynorsk)	Number of representatives
Labour Party (Arbeidarpartiet)	3
Conservative Party (Høgre)	2
Christian Democratic Party (Kristeleg Folkeparti)	2
Centre Party (Senterpartiet)	7
Socialist Left Party (Sosialistisk Venstreparti)	2
Liberal Party (Venstre)	3
Total number of members:	19

Suldal kommunestyre 2011–2015
Party name (in Nynorsk)	Number of representatives
Labour Party (Arbeidarpartiet)	4
Progress Party (Framstegspartiet)	1
Conservative Party (Høgre)	2
Christian Democratic Party (Kristeleg Folkeparti)	3
Centre Party (Senterpartiet)	6
Socialist Left Party (Sosialistisk Venstreparti)	1
Liberal Party (Venstre)	2
Total number of members:	19

Suldal kommunestyre 2007–2011
Party name (in Nynorsk)	Number of representatives
Labour Party (Arbeidarpartiet)	5
Progress Party (Framstegspartiet)	2
Conservative Party (Høgre)	1
Christian Democratic Party (Kristeleg Folkeparti)	4
Centre Party (Senterpartiet)	9
Socialist Left Party (Sosialistisk Venstreparti)	3
Liberal Party (Venstre)	1
Total number of members:	25

Suldal kommunestyre 2003–2007
Party name (in Nynorsk)	Number of representatives
Labour Party (Arbeidarpartiet)	5
Conservative Party (Høgre)	2
Christian Democratic Party (Kristeleg Folkeparti)	4
Centre Party (Senterpartiet)	8
Socialist Left Party (Sosialistisk Venstreparti)	4
Liberal Party (Venstre)	2
Total number of members:	25

Suldal kommunestyre 1999–2003
Party name (in Nynorsk)	Number of representatives
Labour Party (Arbeidarpartiet)	5
Conservative Party (Høgre)	2
Christian Democratic Party (Kristeleg Folkeparti)	5
Centre Party (Senterpartiet)	7
Socialist Left Party (Sosialistisk Venstreparti)	2
Liberal Party (Venstre)	4
Total number of members:	25

Suldal kommunestyre 1995–1999
Party name (in Nynorsk)	Number of representatives
Labour Party (Arbeidarpartiet)	7
Conservative Party (Høgre)	2
Christian Democratic Party (Kristeleg Folkeparti)	5
Centre Party (Senterpartiet)	10
Socialist Left Party (Sosialistisk Venstreparti)	5
Liberal Party (Venstre)	4
Total number of members:	33

Suldal kommunestyre 1991–1995
Party name (in Nynorsk)	Number of representatives
Labour Party (Arbeidarpartiet)	7
Conservative Party (Høgre)	3
Christian Democratic Party (Kristeleg Folkeparti)	5
Centre Party (Senterpartiet)	13
Socialist Left Party (Sosialistisk Venstreparti)	2
Liberal Party (Venstre)	2
Common List (Samlingslista)	1
Total number of members:	33

Suldal kommunestyre 1987–1991
Party name (in Nynorsk)	Number of representatives
Labour Party (Arbeidarpartiet)	7
Conservative Party (Høgre)	3
Christian Democratic Party (Kristeleg Folkeparti)	6
Centre Party (Senterpartiet)	10
Socialist Left Party (Sosialistisk Venstreparti)	1
Liberal Party (Venstre)	3
Common list (Samlingslista)	3
Total number of members:	33

Suldal kommunestyre 1983–1987
Party name (in Nynorsk)	Number of representatives
Labour Party (Arbeidarpartiet)	7
Conservative Party (Høgre)	4
Christian Democratic Party (Kristeleg Folkeparti)	6
Centre Party (Senterpartiet)	9
Socialist Left Party (Sosialistisk Venstreparti)	1
Liberal Party (Venstre)	2
Common list (Samlingslista)	4
Total number of members:	33

Suldal kommunestyre 1979–1983
Party name (in Nynorsk)	Number of representatives
Labour Party (Arbeidarpartiet)	6
Conservative Party (Høgre)	5
Christian Democratic Party (Kristeleg Folkeparti)	6
Centre Party (Senterpartiet)	8
Socialist Left Party (Sosialistisk Venstreparti)	1
Liberal Party (Venstre)	3
Common list (Samlingsliste)	4
Total number of members:	33

Suldal kommunestyre 1975–1979
Party name (in Nynorsk)	Number of representatives
Labour Party (Arbeidarpartiet)	5
Conservative Party (Høgre)	2
Christian Democratic Party (Kristeleg Folkeparti)	8
Centre Party (Senterpartiet)	10
Socialist Left Party (Sosialistisk Venstreparti)	1
Common list (Samlingslista)	7
Total number of members:	33

Suldal kommunestyre 1971–1975
Party name (in Nynorsk)	Number of representatives
Labour Party (Arbeidarpartiet)	7
Christian Democratic Party (Kristeleg Folkeparti)	7
Centre Party (Senterpartiet)	13
Liberal Party (Venstre)	6
Total number of members:	33

Suldal kommunestyre 1967–1971
Party name (in Nynorsk)	Number of representatives
Labour Party (Arbeidarpartiet)	8
Christian Democratic Party (Kristeleg Folkeparti)	6
Centre Party (Senterpartiet)	11
Liberal Party (Venstre)	6
Local List(s) (Lokale lister)	2
Total number of members:	33

Suldal kommunestyre 1963–1967
Party name (in Nynorsk)	Number of representatives
Labour Party (Arbeidarpartiet)	2
Centre Party (Senterpartiet)	5
Local List(s) (Lokale lister)	6
Total number of members:	13

Suldal heradsstyre 1959–1963
Party name (in Nynorsk)	Number of representatives
Labour Party (Arbeidarpartiet)	2
Christian Democratic Party (Kristeleg Folkeparti)	1
Local List(s) (Lokale lister)	10
Total number of members:	13

Suldal heradsstyre 1955–1959
Party name (in Nynorsk)	Number of representatives
Labour Party (Arbeidarpartiet)	3
Christian Democratic Party (Kristeleg Folkeparti)	1
Local List(s) (Lokale lister)	9
Total number of members:	13

Suldal heradsstyre 1951–1955
Party name (in Nynorsk)	Number of representatives
Labour Party (Arbeidarpartiet)	2
Local List(s) (Lokale lister)	10
Total number of members:	12

Suldal heradsstyre 1947–1951
Party name (in Nynorsk)	Number of representatives
Labour Party (Arbeidarpartiet)	3
Local List(s) (Lokale lister)	9
Total number of members:	12

Suldal heradsstyre 1945–1947
Party name (in Nynorsk)	Number of representatives
Labour Party (Arbeidarpartiet)	3
Local List(s) (Lokale lister)	9
Total number of members:	12

Suldal heradsstyre 1937–1941*
Party name (in Nynorsk)	Number of representatives
Labour Party (Arbeidarpartiet)	1
Local List(s) (Lokale lister)	9
Christian common party (Kristelig samlingsparti)	2
Total number of members:	12
Note: Due to the German occupation of Norway during World War II, no elections were held for new municipal councils until after the war ended in 1945.

=== Mayors ===
The mayor (Nynorsk: ordførar) of Suldal Municipality is the political leader of the municipality and the chairperson of the municipal council. The following people have held this position:

- 1838–1845: Lars Olsen Colbeinstvedt
- 1846–1849: Thore A. Straabø
- 1850–1855: Lars Olsen Colbeinstvedt
- 1856–1859: Njeld Larsen Kolbeinstveit (V)
- 1860–1861: Lars Olsen Colbeinstvedt
- 1862–1863: Njeld Larsen Kolbeinstveit (V)
- 1864–1865: Thor A. Straabø
- 1866–1869: Njeld Larsen Kolbeinstveit (V)
- 1870–1875: Lars J. Foss
- 1876–1881: Njeld Larsen Kolbeinstveit (V)
- 1882–1883: Lars L. Vaage
- 1884–1893: Gabriel J. Roalkvam
- 1894–1902: Lars N. Kolbeinstveit
- 1903–1913: Jakob J. Roalkvam
- 1914–1916: John O. Vetrhus
- 1917–1942: Hans Høines
- 1942–1945: Lars Løland Hiim
- 1945–1945: Hans Høines
- 1946–1955: Erling Ritland
- 1956–1959: Aake Herabakka
- 1960–1971: Trygve Kvæstad
- 1971–1975: Odd Bråtveit (Sp)
- 1975–1979: Kåre Vågane (KrF)
- 1979–1991: Halvard Bakka (Sp)
- 1991–1998: Torkel Myklebust (Sp)
- 1998–1999: Eldbjørg Sivertsen (KrF)
- 1999–2003: Roar Obrestad (KrF)
- 2003–2007: Andreas Drarvik (Sp)
- 2007–2015: Torkel Myklebust (Sp)
- 2015–2023: Gerd Helen Bø (Sp)
- 2023–present: Mads Drange (Ap)

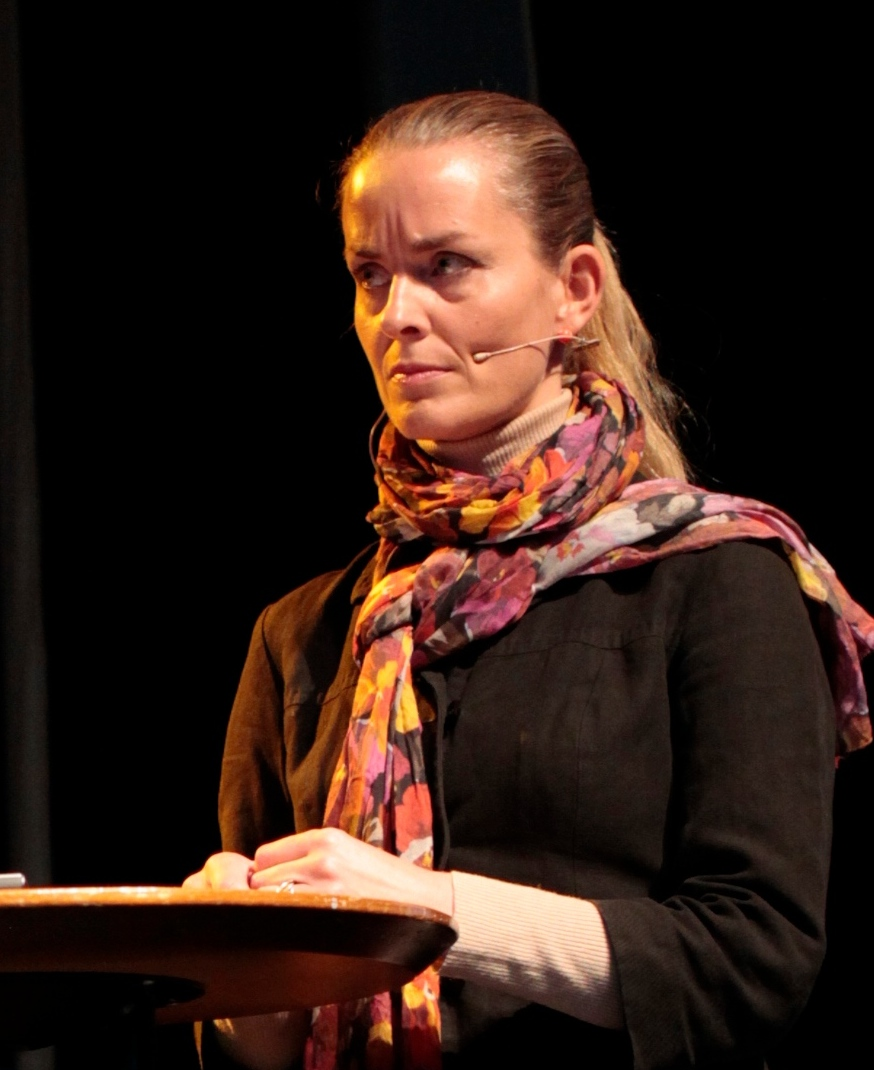
Hilde Sandvik, 2012

== Notable people ==
- Rasmus Løland (1861 at Ryfylke – 1907), a journalist, novelist, and children's writer
- Trygve Fjetland (1926 in Jelsa – 2013), a businessperson
- Hilde Sandvik (born 1970 in Erfjord), a journalist
- Inger Bråtveit (born 1978), a novelist and children's writer who grew up in Suldal
