= Suldalslågen =

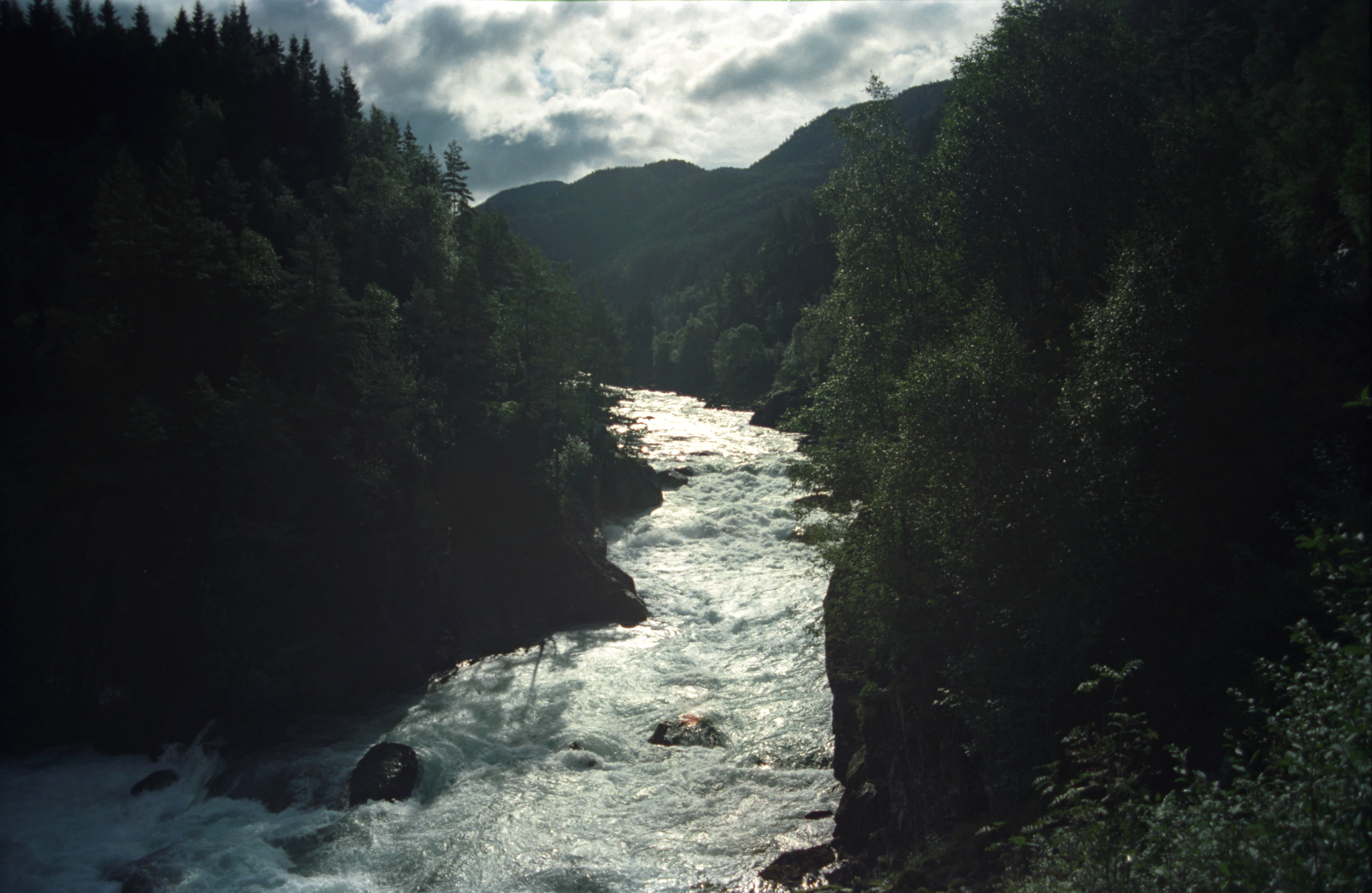
- View of the river

Location
- Country: Norway
- County: Rogaland
- District: Ryfylke
- Municipality: Suldal Municipality

Physical characteristics
- Source: Suldalsvatnet
  - location: Rogaland, Norway
  - coordinates: 59°31′35″N 06°35′56″E
  - elevation: 69 m (226 ft)
- Mouth: Sandsfjorden
  - location: Sand, Rogaland, Norway
  - coordinates: 59°26′52″N 06°15′03″E
  - elevation: 0 m (0 ft)
- Length: 22 km (14 mi)
- Basin size: 1,463 km^{2} (565 sq mi)
- Discharge
  - average: 50 m^{3}/s (1,800 cu ft/s)

The Suldalslågen (or locally, Lågen) is a river that is located in Suldal Municipality in Rogaland county, Norway. The 22-kilometre (14 mi) long river runs from the lake Suldalsvatnet to the southwest to the village of Sand where it empties into the Sandsfjorden. The Norwegian National Road 13 runs along the river, past the villages of Suldal and Sand.

The Suldalslågen has a natural watershed of 1,463 square kilometres (565 sq mi), of which 75% is above the timber line in high mountain areas, making it western Norway's largest river system. The Suldalslågen and its upstream watercourses are heavily dammed and regulated (including transfer of water across catchment borders) for hydroelectric power generation, and represents about 6% of Norway's total hydroelectric power generation. The upper tributaries of the Suldalslågen are located on the vast Hardangervidda plateau in Ullensvang Municipality (in Vestland county) and Vinje Municipality (in Telemark county).

The Suldalslågen one of Norway's most famous Atlantic salmon rivers, with a fishing history dating back hundreds of years.

== See also ==
- List of rivers in Norway
