= Vassdalseggi =

Mountain in Norway

- Vassdalseggjo / Vassdalsegga

Highest point
- Elevation: 1,658 m (5,440 ft)
- Prominence: 508 m (1,667 ft)
- Isolation: 12 km (7.5 mi)
- Listing: 11 at List of highest points of Norwegian counties
- Coordinates: 59°45′48″N 7°06′38″E

Geography
- Location: Rogaland and Telemark, Norway
- Parent range: Ryfylkeheiane
- Topo map: 1414 IV Haukelisæter and 1414 I Songavatnet

Vassdalseggi is the tallest mountain in Rogaland county, Norway. The 1,658-metre (5,440 ft) tall mountain sits on the border of Vinje Municipality (in Telemark county) and Suldal Municipality (in Rogaland county). Vassdalseggi lies in the Ryfylkeheiane mountains about 5 kilometres (3.1 mi) north of the mountain Fitjanuten and about 2.5 kilometres (1.6 mi) southeast of the mountain Kistenuten.

== See also ==
- List of mountains of Norway
- List of highest points of Norwegian counties
