= Kistenuten =

Mountain in Norway

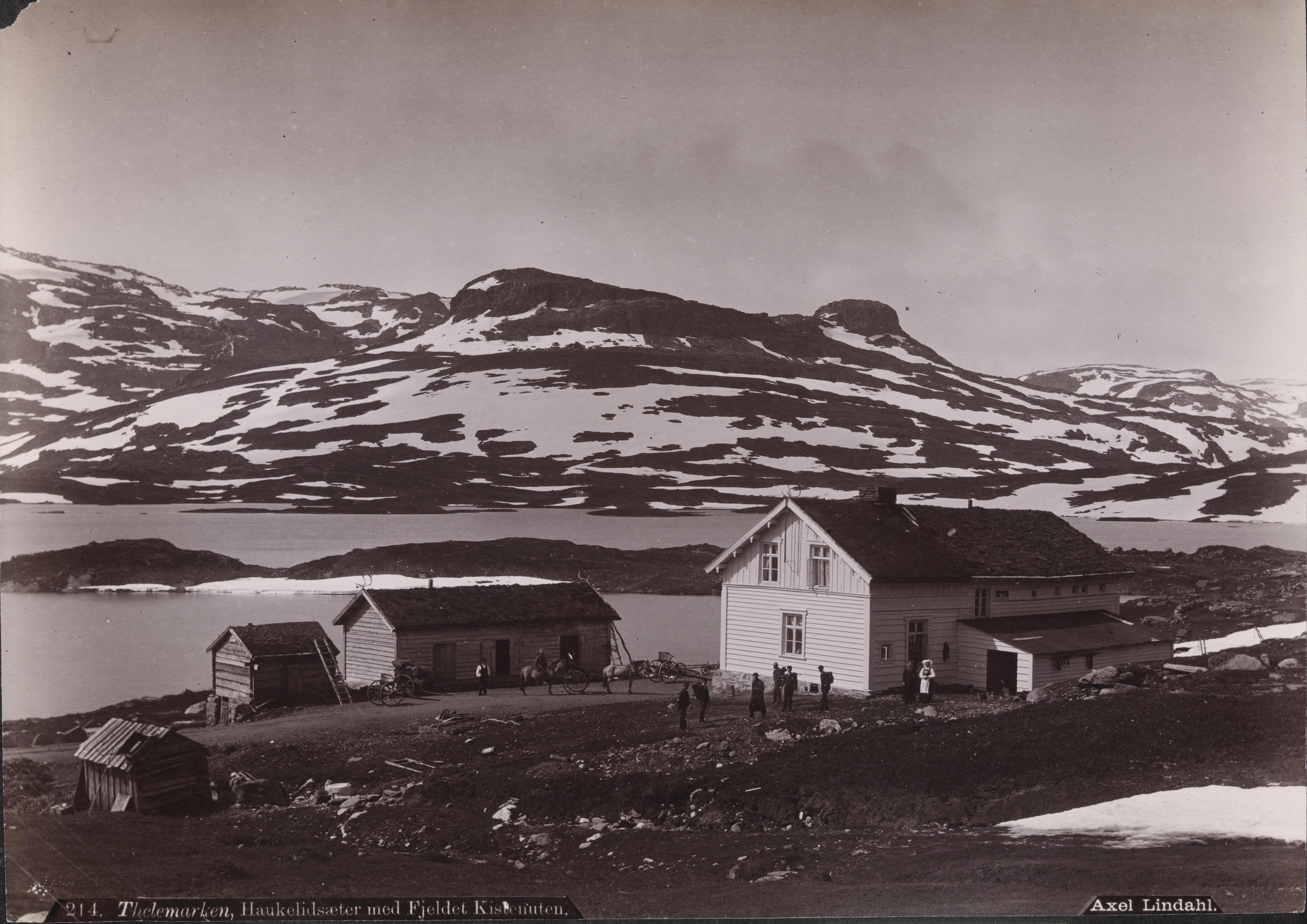
- View of the mountain (c. 1885)

Highest point
- Elevation: 1,648 m (5,407 ft)
- Prominence: 309 m (1,014 ft)
- Parent peak: Vassdalseggi
- Isolation: 2.3 km (1.4 mi)
- Coordinates: 59°46′58″N 7°05′47″E

Geography
- Location: Southern Norway
- Parent range: Ryfylkeheiane

Kistenuten is a 1,648-metre (5,407 ft) tall mountain in southern Norway. It is located in the Ryfylkeheiane mountains at the tripoint border of three different counties (and three municipalities): Suldal Municipality in Rogaland county, Ullensvang Municipality in Vestland county, and Vinje Municipality in Telemark county. The mountain is the fourth tallest mountain in Telemark county, the second tallest in Rogaland county, but it is not even in the top 25 tallest mountains in Vestland county. The mountain Sandfloegga lies about 18 kilometres (11 mi) to the north, inside Hardangervidda National Park.

== See also ==
- List of mountains of Norway
