= Suldalsvatnet =

Lake in Norway

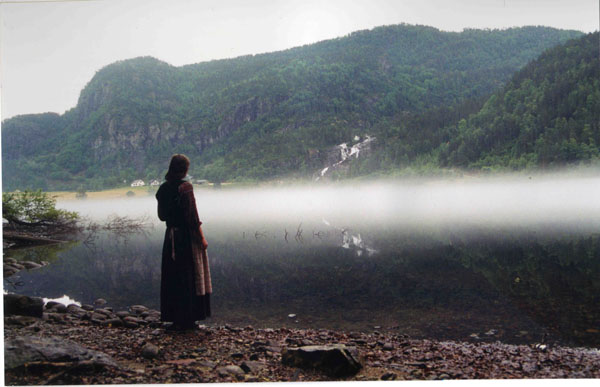
- Interactive map of Suldalsvatnet
- Location: Suldal Municipality, Rogaland
- Coordinates: 59.52667°N 6.59911°E
- Type: Glacial fjord lake
- Primary inflows: Brattlandsdalåa, Eivindsåa, Hamrabøåa, Helganesåna, Kvilldalsåa, Roaldkvamsåa and Storåa
- Primary outflows: Suldalslågen
- Catchment area: 1,303.75 km^{2} (503.38 sq mi)
- Basin countries: Norway
- Max. length: 29 kilometres (18 mi)
- Max. width: 1.8 kilometres (1.1 mi)
- Surface area: 28.83 km^{2} (11.13 sq mi)
- Average depth: 156 m (512 ft)
- Max. depth: 376 m (1,234 ft)
- Water volume: 4.51 km^{3} (1.08 cu mi)
- Shore length^{1}: 76 kilometres (47 mi)
- Surface elevation: 69 metres (226 ft)
- References: NVE
- ^{1} Shore length is not a well-defined measure.

Suldalsvatnet (lit. 'Lake Suldal') is the sixth-deepest lake in Norway. The 376-metre (1,234 ft) deep lake lies in Suldal Municipality in Rogaland county, Norway. The 29-square-kilometre (11 sq mi) lake is the headwaters of the river Suldalslågen and it sits at an elevation of 69 metres (226 ft) above sea level. The lake has a volume of 4.51 cubic kilometres (1.08 cu mi).

The 29-kilometre (18 mi) long lake is regulated for use in two nearby hydroelectric power plants.
