= Torvastad Municipality =

Former municipality in Rogaland, Norway

Torvastad Municipality Torvastad herad
- Former municipality
- Torvestad herred (historic name)
- Rogaland within Norway

- Torvastad within Rogaland
- Coordinates: 59°22′49″N 05°14′13″E
- Country: Norway
- County: Rogaland
- District: Haugaland
- Established: 1 Jan 1838
  - Created as: Formannskapsdistrikt
- Disestablished: 1 Jan 1965
  - Succeeded by: Haugesund Municipality and Karmøy Municipality
- Administrative centre: Torvastad

Government
  - Mayor (1959–1964): Thomas Stange (V)

Area (upon dissolution)
  - Total: 25.9 km^{2} (10.0 sq mi)
  - Rank: #489 in Norway
- Highest elevation: 128 m (420 ft)

Population (1964)
  - Total: 3,628
  - Rank: #260 in Norway
  - Density: 140.1/km^{2} (363/sq mi)
  - Change (10 years): ▲ +30.9%
- Demonym: Torvastadbu

Official language
  - Norwegian form: Nynorsk
- Time zone: UTC+01:00 (CET)
  - Summer (DST): UTC+02:00 (CEST)
- ISO 3166 code: NO-1152

Torvastad is a former municipality in Rogaland county, Norway. The 25.9-square-kilometre (10.0 sq mi) municipality existed from 1838 until its dissolution in 1965. The area is now mostly part of Karmøy Municipality in the traditional district of Haugaland. The administrative centre was the village of Haugesund (from 1838 until 1855), and after that it was the village of Torvastad on the island of Karmøy. Other villages in the municipality included Norheim and Vormedal.

Torvastad Municipality originally encompassed parts of the present-day Haugesund Municipality, Utsira Municipality, and Karmøy Municipality. It included the northwesternmost part of the mainland of Rogaland county plus the northern part of the island of Karmøy and the islands of Utsira, Røvær, Vibrandsøy, and Feøy. It got smaller over the years, and upon its dissolution in 1965, the municipality covered only 26 square kilometres (10 sq mi).

Prior to its dissolution in 1965, the 25.9-square-kilometre (10.0 sq mi) municipality was the 489th largest by area out of the 525 municipalities in Norway. Torvastad Municipality was the 260th most populous municipality in Norway with a population of about 3,628. The municipality's population density was 140.1 inhabitants per square kilometre (363/sq mi) and its population had increased by 30.9% over the previous 10-year period.

== General information ==
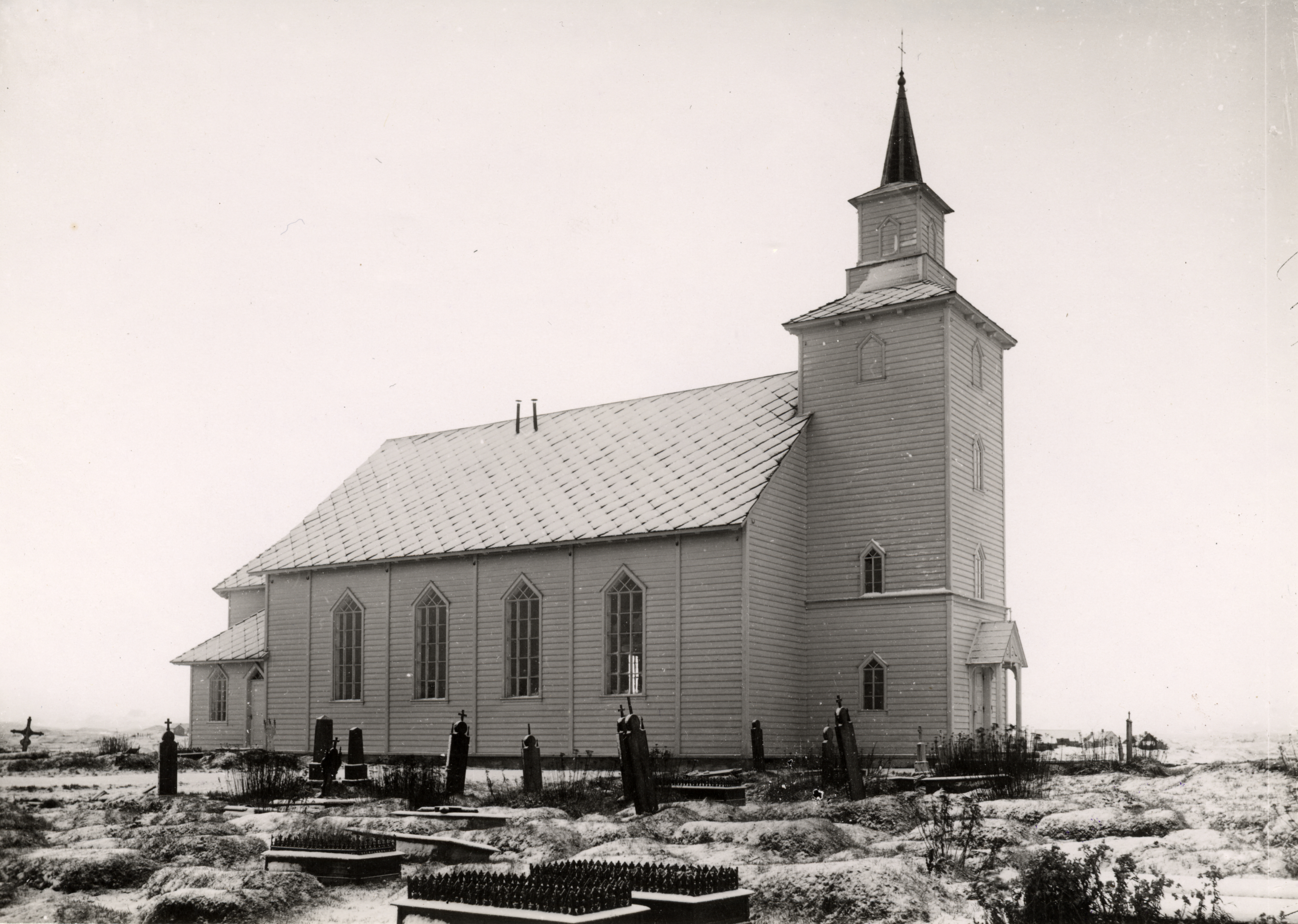
Torvastad Church

The parish of Torvestad was established as a municipality on 1 January 1838 (see formannskapsdistrikt law). On 1 February 1855, the village of Haugesund was declared a "ladested" (port of lading). The law said that a ladested could not be part of a rural municipality, so it was separated from Torvastad Municipality to form a municipality of its own. The split left Torvastad Municipality with 3,242 inhabitants.

On 1 November 1881, Torvastad Municipality was divided. Most of the mainland part of Torvastad Municipality (population: 1,665) became the new Skaare Municipality and the rest of Torvastad Municipality (population: 1,918) continued on as a smaller Torvastad Municipality.

On 1 July 1924, the island of Utsira and some small surrounding islands (population: 414) were separated from Torvastad Municipality to form the new Utsira Municipality. This left Torvastad Municipality was left with 2,187 residents.

On 1 January 1965, Torvastad Municipality was dissolved upon recommendations of the Schei Committee and its lands were divided as follows:

- the small island of Vibrandsøy (population: 70) was transferred to Haugesund Municipality
- the rest of Torvastad Municipality (population: 3,783) was merged with the following areas to form the new Karmøy Municipality:
  - all of the town of Kopervik (population: 1,737)
  - all of the town of Skudeneshavn (population: 1,275)
  - all of the Skudenes Municipality (population: 3,583)
  - all of the Stangaland Municipality (population: 2,678)
  - all of the Åkra Municipality (population: 6,008)
  - most of Avaldsnes Municipality (population: 4,153), except for the Gismarvik, Førre, and Stegaberg areas that became part of Tysvær Municipality

=== Name ===
The municipality (originally the parish) is named after the old Torvastad farm (Old Norse: Torfastaðir) since the first Torvastad Church was built there. The first element is the genitive case of the male name Torfi. The last element is the plural form of staður which means "farm" or "location". Thus the name is something like "Torfi's farm" or "Torfi's place".

Historically, the name of the municipality was spelled Torvestad. On 3 November 1917, a royal resolution changed the spelling of the name of the municipality to Torvastad.

=== Churches ===
The Church of Norway had one parish (sokn) within Torvastad Municipality. At the time of the municipal dissolution, it was part of the Torvastad prestegjeld and the Karmsund prosti (deanery) in the Diocese of Stavanger.

Churches in Torvastad Municipality
Parish (sokn)	Church name	Location of the church	Year built
Torvastad	Torvastad Church	Torvastad	1880

== Geography ==
The municipality encompassed the northern part of the island of Karmøy, plus a small area on the mainland, across the Karmsundet strait. The highest point in the municipality was the 128-metre (420 ft) tall ridge to the northeast of the village of Vormedal. Haugesund Municipality was located to the north, Avaldsnes Municipality was located to the east and south, and Utsira Municipality was located to the southwest.

== Government ==
While it existed, Torvastad Municipality was responsible for primary education (through 10th grade), outpatient health services, senior citizen services, welfare and other social services, zoning, economic development, and municipal roads and utilities. The municipality was governed by a municipal council of directly elected representatives. The mayor was indirectly elected by a vote of the municipal council. The municipality was under the jurisdiction of the Karmsund District Court and the Gulating Court of Appeal.

=== Municipal council ===
The municipal council (Herradsstyre) of Torvastad Municipality was made up of 17 representatives that were elected to four year terms. The tables below show the historical composition of the council by political party.

Torvastad heradsstyre 1963–1965
Party name (in Nynorsk)	Number of representatives
Labour Party (Arbeidarpartiet)	7
Conservative Party (Høgre)	2
Christian Democratic Party (Kristeleg Folkeparti)	2
Centre Party (Senterpartiet)	3
Liberal Party (Venstre)	3
Total number of members:	17
Note: On 1 January 1965, Torvastad Municipality became part of Karmøy Municipality.

Torvastad heradsstyre 1959–1963
Party name (in Nynorsk)	Number of representatives
Labour Party (Arbeidarpartiet)	5
Conservative Party (Høgre)	2
Christian Democratic Party (Kristeleg Folkeparti)	2
Centre Party (Senterpartiet)	3
Liberal Party (Venstre)	4
Local List(s) (Lokale lister)	1
Total number of members:	17

Torvastad heradsstyre 1955–1959
Party name (in Nynorsk)	Number of representatives
Labour Party (Arbeidarpartiet)	6
Conservative Party (Høgre)	2
Christian Democratic Party (Kristeleg Folkeparti)	3
Farmers' Party (Bondepartiet)	2
Liberal Party (Venstre)	4
Total number of members:	17

Torvastad heradsstyre 1951–1955
Party name (in Nynorsk)	Number of representatives
Labour Party (Arbeidarpartiet)	3
Christian Democratic Party (Kristeleg Folkeparti)	2
Liberal Party (Venstre)	4
Joint List(s) of Non-Socialist Parties (Borgarlege Felleslister)	3
Total number of members:	12

Torvastad heradsstyre 1947–1951
Party name (in Nynorsk)	Number of representatives
Labour Party (Arbeidarpartiet)	3
Conservative Party (Høgre)	2
Christian Democratic Party (Kristeleg Folkeparti)	2
Farmers' Party (Bondepartiet)	1
Joint list of the Liberal Party (Venstre) and the Radical People's Party (Radikale Folkepartiet)	4
Total number of members:	12

Torvastad heradsstyre 1945–1947
Party name (in Nynorsk)	Number of representatives
Labour Party (Arbeidarpartiet)	5
Christian Democratic Party (Kristeleg Folkeparti)	1
Farmers' Party (Bondepartiet)	1
Local List(s) (Lokale lister)	5
Total number of members:	12

Torvastad heradsstyre 1937–1941*
Party name (in Nynorsk)	Number of representatives
Labour Party (Arbeidarpartiet)	2
Farmers' Party (Bondepartiet)	2
Joint List(s) of Non-Socialist Parties (Borgarlege Felleslister)	8
Total number of members:	12
Note: Due to the German occupation of Norway during World War II, no elections were held for new municipal councils until after the war ended in 1945.

=== Mayors ===
The mayor (Nynorsk: ordførar) of Torvastad Municipality was the political leader of the municipality and the chairperson of the municipal council. The following people have held this position:

- 1838–1840: Nils Jørgensen Vibrandsø
- 1841–1845: John Bendix Johnsen Brække
- 1846–1847: Ditlev Møller
- 1848–1849: Johannes Christian Bøe
- 1850–1851: John Christian Johnsen Haaland
- 1852–1852: Hans Andreas Høstad
- 1853–1881: Haagen Jørgensen Storsteen
- 1882–1887: Ole Johannesen Storsteen
- 1888–1891: Christian C. Haaland
- 1892–1897: Ole Johannesen Storsteen
- 1898–1898: Christian C. Haaland
- 1899–1901: Ole Johannesen Storsteen
- 1902–1907: Christian O. Haaland
- 1908–1913: Thomas L. Haaland
- 1914–1916: John Christian B. Hausken
- 1917–1919: Nils A. Økland
- 1919–1922: Bendik Stange
- 1922–1925: Kristian B. Hausken
- 1925–1928: Thore L. Hausken
- 1928–1941: Knut Stange
- 1942–1944: Bendik Hausken
- 1945–1945: Finn Retzius
- 1945–1945: Knut Stange
- 1946–1947: Arnt Stange (Ap)
- 1947–1958: Lars Håland
- 1958–1959: Hans Midttun (Ap)
- 1959–1964: Thomas Stange (V)

== See also ==
- List of former municipalities of Norway
