= Karmøy =

Karmøy most commonly refers to:

- Karmøy Municipality, a municipality in Rogaland county, Norway
- Karmøy (island), the main island of the municipality of Karmøy

It may also refer to:

- Mainland-Karmøy, the part of Karmøy Municipality located on the mainland of Norway
- Haugesund Airport, Karmøy, an airport on the island of Karmøy
