= Mainland-Karmøy =

Area of Karmøy municipality, Norway

Karmsund Bridge was opened by Crown Prince Olav in October 1955. It connects Mainland-Karmøy with the island of Karmøy and is a part of E134.

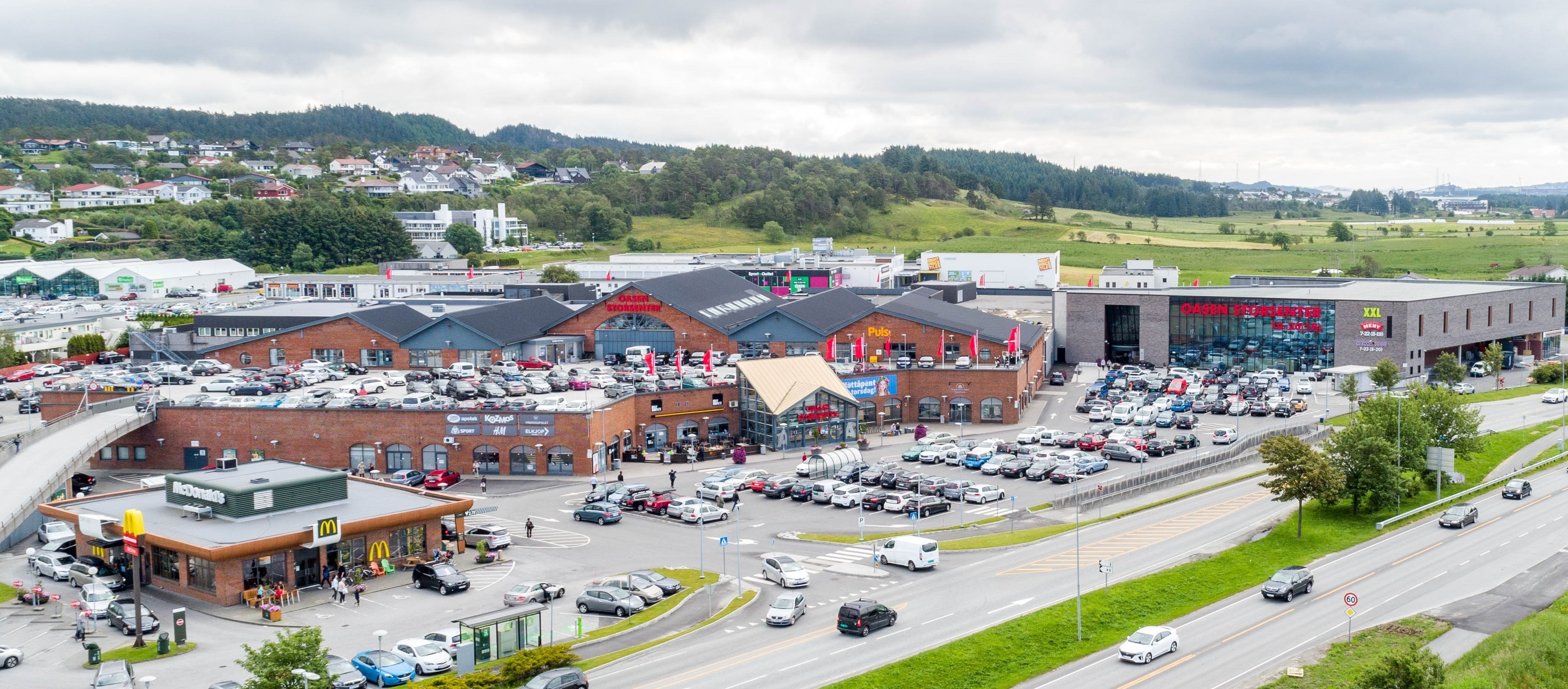
Oasen Storsenter at Norheim, 2019.

Mainland-Karmøy (Fastlands-Karmøy) is the part of Karmøy Municipality in Rogaland county that is located on Norway's mainland. The area includes the villages of Moksheim, Norheim, Spanne, Vormedal, Kolnes, and Røyksund. In statistical contexts, the island of Fosen is also considered part of Mainland-Karmøy. The area has approximately 10,000 inhabitants, corresponding to nearly one quarter of the municipality's population.

Most of the area formerly belonged to the former Avaldsnes Municipality and Torvastad Municipality, but was incorporated into Karmøy Municipality during a large municipal merger and reorganization in 1965. Parts of Mainland-Karmøy are considered to be part of the urban area of the town of Haugesund, despite being outside Haugesund Municipality. The question of municipal affiliation has been a subject of debate since the 1980s.

== History ==
Original borders between farms in the former Avaldsnes Municipality.

Archaeological finds, including those from Tuastad, indicate settlement in the area for over 6,000 years. Several farms are thought to have been established during the Migration Period, and some properties are recorded in written sources from the early 1500s.

Before the establishment of Karmøy Municipality in 1965, most of Mainland-Karmøy belonged to the former Avaldsnes Municipality and Torvastad Municipality. At the time of the merger, some farms in the eastern part of Avaldsnes Municipality were transferred to Tysvær Municipality, while the rest were incorporated into Karmøy Municipality.

A notable cultural monument in the area is the rock carving "The Five Wayward Virgins" (De fem dårlige jomfruer) near the Karmsund Bridge.

== Geography and society ==
Mainland-Karmøy borders Haugesund Municipality to the northwest, Tysvær Municipality to the northeast, and Bokn Municipality across the sea to the south. To the west, the Karmsund strait separates the mainland from the island of Karmøy.

The area has approximately 10,000 inhabitants, nearly one quarter of Karmøy's population. Oasen Storsenter, located in the area, is the second-largest shopping center in the Haugaland region, both in size and turnover, after Alti Amanda in Haugesund.

Sports clubs in the area include Karmøy Badmintonklubb, Karmøy Svømmeklubb, SK Nord, Haugesund Golfklubb, and Kolnes IL.

== Municipal debate ==
The question of Mainland-Karmøy's municipal affiliation has been discussed periodically since 1982.

In 2016, an action group submitted a citizens' initiative calling for a referendum on a municipal border change, but the proposal was unanimously rejected by the municipal council of Karmøy Municipality. Three years later, the County Governor of Rogaland asked the municipalities to comment on a possible report of the issue. Haugesund Municipality was in favor, while Karmøy Municipality opposed it, and the case was referred to the Ministry of Local Government and Modernization.

Karmøy Municipality's political leadership has expressed opposition to a municipal border change, citing Mainland-Karmøy's importance to the municipality and investments in infrastructure. Others have noted that dissatisfaction among parts of the population should be considered.

Public opinion has been divided. Some residents support affiliation with Haugesund Municipality due to proximity to the city center, services, and regional coordination, while others emphasize local identity and maintain that the area is already prioritized by Karmøy Municipality.

The business community has also taken part in the debate. The manager of Oasen Storsenter expressed support for a long-term municipal merger in the Haugaland region. At the same time, several business representatives and residents have expressed criticism, arguing that Mainland-Karmøy functions well as part of Karmøy Municipality, and that a possible transfer to Haugesund Municipality could limit opportunities for business development.
