= Eike, Rogaland =

Village in Karmøy Municipality, Norway

Eike
- Village
- Interactive map of Eike
- Coordinates: 59.39448°N 5.37131°E
- Country: Norway
- Region: Western Norway
- County: Rogaland
- District: Haugaland
- Municipality: Karmøy Municipality
- Elevation: 47 m (154 ft)
- Time zone: UTC+01:00 (CET)
  - Summer (DST): UTC+02:00 (CEST)
- Post Code: 5541 Kolnes

Eike is a village in Karmøy Municipality in Rogaland county, Norway. The village is located along the western shore of the Førresfjorden, just southeast of the town of Haugesund. The village of Eike, lies just south of the border with the neighboring Tysvær Municipality. Eike is considered part of the larger urban area of the village of Førre, which is centered over the border in Tysvær Municipality. The village of Norheim lies about 4 kilometres (2.5 mi) to the west and the village of Vormedal lies about 6 kilometres (3.7 mi) to the southwest.
