= Vormedal =

Village in Karmøy Municipality, Norway

- Village
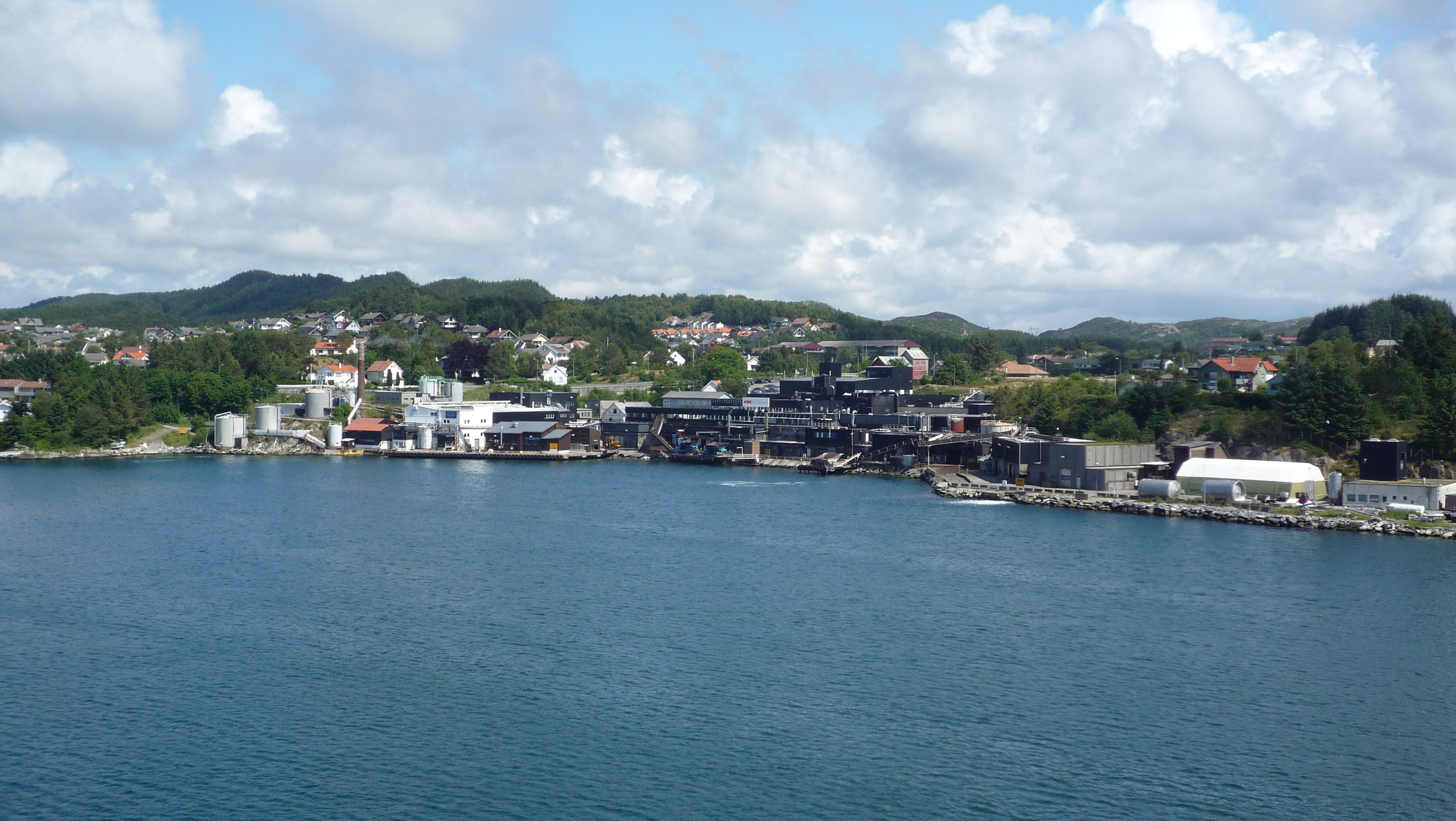
- View of the village
- Interactive map of Vormedal
- Coordinates: 59.35605°N 5.31972°E
- Country: Norway
- Region: Western Norway
- County: Rogaland
- District: Haugaland
- Municipality: Karmøy Municipality

Area
  - Total: 1.28 km^{2} (0.49 sq mi)
- Elevation: 23 m (75 ft)

Population (2014)
  - Total: 2,738
  - Density: 2,139/km^{2} (5,540/sq mi)
- Time zone: UTC+01:00 (CET)
  - Summer (DST): UTC+02:00 (CEST)
- Post Code: 5545 Vormedal

Vormedal is a village in Karmøy Municipality in Rogaland county, Norway. The village is located about 5 kilometres (3.1 mi) south of the city of Haugesund in Western Norway. It sits on the mainland along the Karmsundet strait, directly across the strait from the village of Avaldsnes on the island of Karmøy.

The 1.28-square-kilometre (320-acre) village had a population (2014) of 2,738 and a population density of 2,139 inhabitants per square kilometre (5,540/sq mi). Since 2014, the population and area data for this village area has not been separately tracked by Statistics Norway, instead it has been included in the urban area of the town of Haugesund.

== History ==
Vormedal was originally an area consisting mostly of farmland and it has a documented history going back to the early 1500s. Archaeological finds have indicated that the area has been populated for even longer, possibly for as long as 4000 years.

The area was originally part of the parish (and municipality) of Avaldsnes. It was situated along the old church route that led churchgoers from the areas around the nearby Førresfjorden in the east as they traveled to visit the Avaldsnes Church, after arriving in Vormedal, they had to take a short boat ride across the Karmsundet. Vormedal was also an important location for travelers coming from the village areas more to the south such as Snik, Røyksund, and Fosen as it was the most direct road to Haugesund.

When the Førre Church in the village of Førre opened in 1893, some of the traffic going to and from the church stopped, and when the new main road called Spannevegen opened in the early 1900s, it connected Haugesund with Røyksund, but it ran east of Vormedal, so a lot of the commercial traffic also stopped. In 1965 the old Avaldsnes Municipality was merged with the other municipalities on the island of Karmøy to form the new Karmøy Municipality. In 1978, the first church on mainland of Karmøy Municipality was opened, Norheim Church, located in the village of Norheim just north of Vormedal. This new church was the centre of a new parish which also included Vormedal.

Today, Vormedal mostly consists of large residential areas, with one primary and one lower secondary school; three kindergartens as well as a fire station and a small shopping center. Vormedal also has an alginate production facility owned by FMC Health and Nutrition.
