= Kolnes =

Village in Karmøy Municipality, Norway

Kolnes Kollnes
- Village
- Interactive map of Kolnes
- Coordinates: 59.38655°N 5.37334°E
- Country: Norway
- Region: Western Norway
- County: Rogaland
- District: Haugaland
- Municipality: Karmøy Municipality
- Elevation: 15 m (49 ft)
- Time zone: UTC+01:00 (CET)
  - Summer (DST): UTC+02:00 (CEST)
- Post Code: 5541 Kolnes

Kolnes is a village in Karmøy Municipality in Rogaland county, Norway. The residential village is located on the west side of the Førresfjorden, south of the village of Førre and east of the village of Norheim.

Kolnes has experienced rapid growth. Between 1970 and 2013 the population has increased by 87%. The municipality is planning further growth in the area by opening up 1700 sites for residential housing that is expected to increase the population from 1500 to 4500 between 2012 and 2027.

Rogaland county road 832 is the main route through Kolnes, running between the villages of Aksnes in the south and Eike and Skre in the north where it meets the European route E134 highway. The community is served by Kolumbus bus line 224 six days a week.
