= Åkrasanden =

Beach area in Norway

Åkrasanden Sandane
- Beach
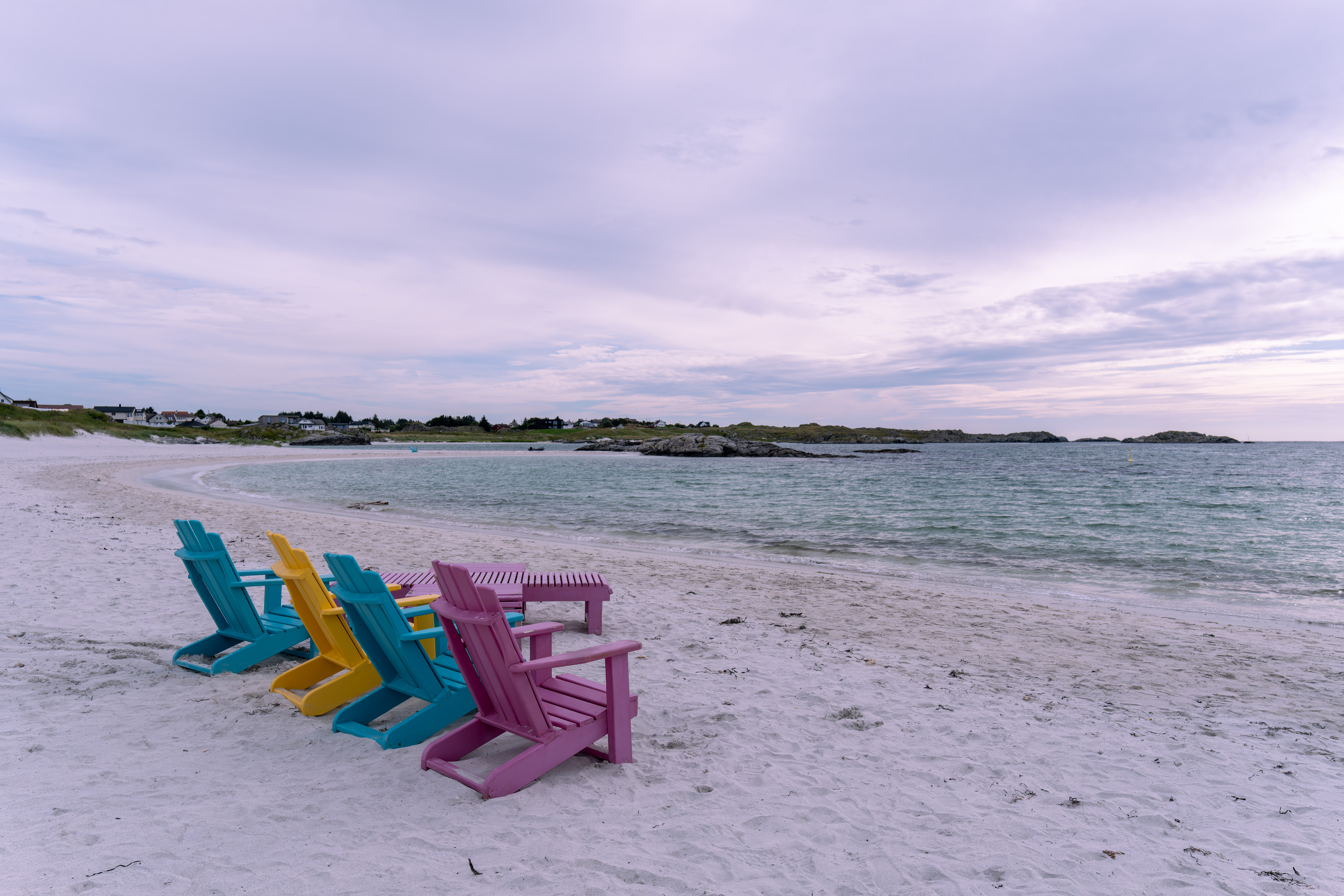
- Beach chairs at Åkrasanden
- Interactive map of Åkrasanden
- Coordinates: 59.25199°N 5.18846°E
- Location: Rogaland, Norway
- Part of: Karmøy
- Elevation: 1 m (3.3 ft)

Åkrasanden, locally also known as Sandane, is a beach area located in the town of Åkrehamn on the island of Karmøy in Karmøy Municipality in Rogaland county, Norway. It is the largest continuous stretch of beach in the whole municipality. Åkrasanden has repeatedly been ranked among Norway's finest beaches, including by the newspaper Dagbladet and the website Klikk.no.

== Beaches and location ==
The coastline comprises seven to eight distinct beaches, each with its own name, ranging from Kaiasanden in the north to Liknessanden in the south. In everyday usage, the name Åkrasanden often refers specifically to the stretch between the Red Cross building and Medhaugshammeren. A nature and cultural heritage trail links Åkrasanden with Stavasanden and Hop near Ferkingstad, about 2–3 kilometers farther south.

== Facilities and use ==
Åkrasanden is a popular destination for outdoor recreation year-round. In summer, the beaches are used for activities such as beach volleyball and windsurfing. The area is equipped with restroom facilities, and accessibility improvements for wheelchair users are in place during the summer season. Colorful chairs have also been installed for visitors.

== Environmental certification ==
The beach is certified with the Blue Flag eco-label, an international award recognizing high standards in water quality, safety, environmental education, and accessibility. Åkrasanden is one of 17 beaches in Norway that meet the criteria for Blue Flag status. The beach and its waters also comply with the requirements of the EU Bathing Water Directive.
