= Visnes, Rogaland =

Village in Karmøy Municipality, Norway

Visnes
- Village
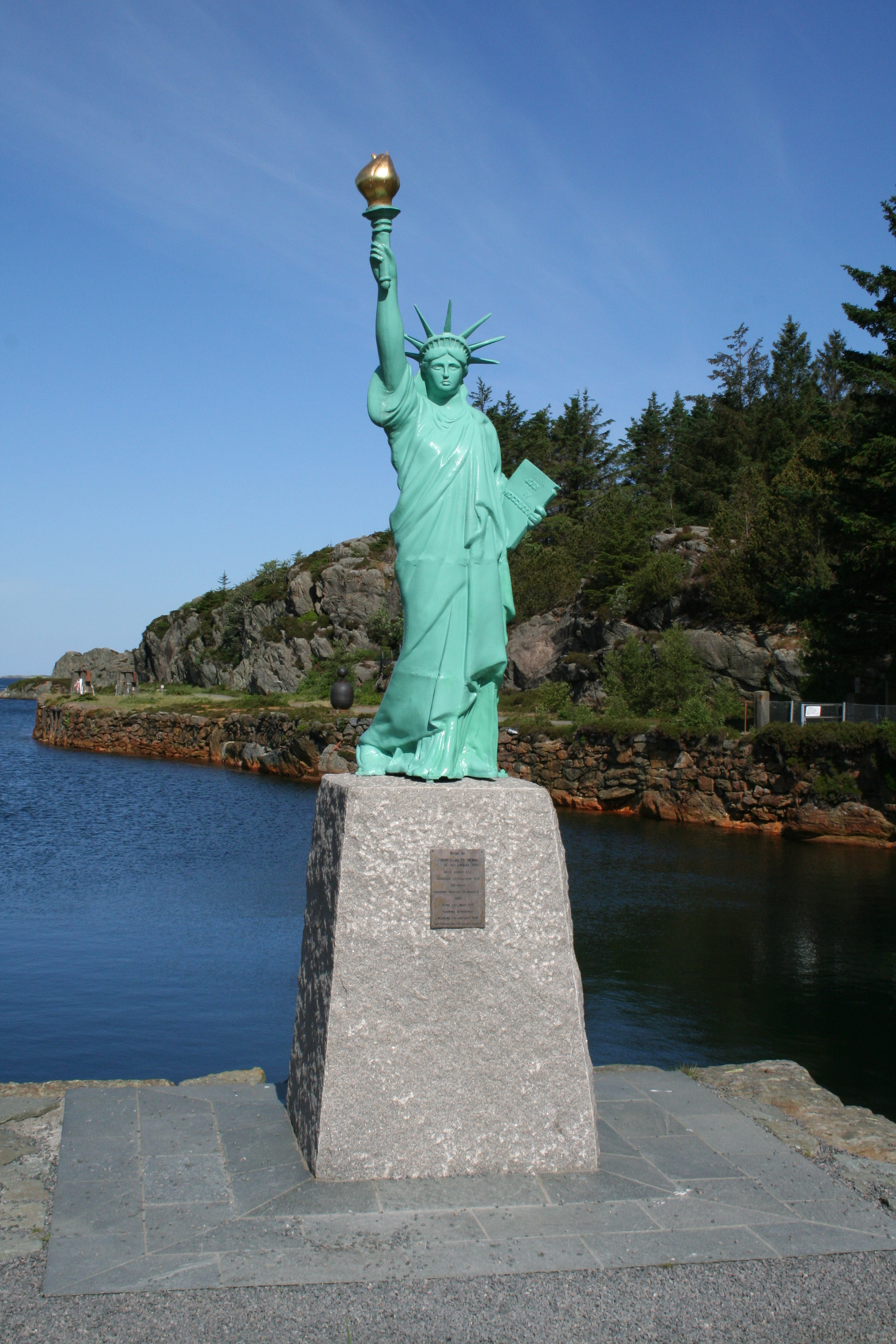
- View of the Statue of Liberty replica in Visnes
- Interactive map of Visnes
- Coordinates: 59.35655°N 5.23817°E
- Country: Norway
- Region: Western Norway
- County: Rogaland
- District: Haugaland
- Municipality: Karmøy Municipality

Area
  - Total: 0.53 km^{2} (0.20 sq mi)
- Elevation: 8 m (26 ft)

Population (2018)
  - Total: 554
  - Density: 1,045/km^{2} (2,710/sq mi)
- Time zone: UTC+01:00 (CET)
  - Summer (DST): UTC+02:00 (CEST)
- Post Code: 4262 Avaldsnes

Visnes is a village in Karmøy Municipality in Rogaland county, Norway. The village is located on the western shore of the island of Karmøy, about 2.5 kilometres (1.6 mi) west of the village of Avaldsnes.

The 0.53-square-kilometre (130-acre) village had a population (2018) of 554 and a population density of 1,045 inhabitants per square kilometre (2,710/sq mi). Since 2018, the population and area data for this village area has not been separately tracked by Statistics Norway.

== Mining ==
Visnes has a local copper mine that provided material for the Statue of Liberty in New York City.
