= Torvastad Church =

Church in Rogaland, Norway

- Torvastad kirke
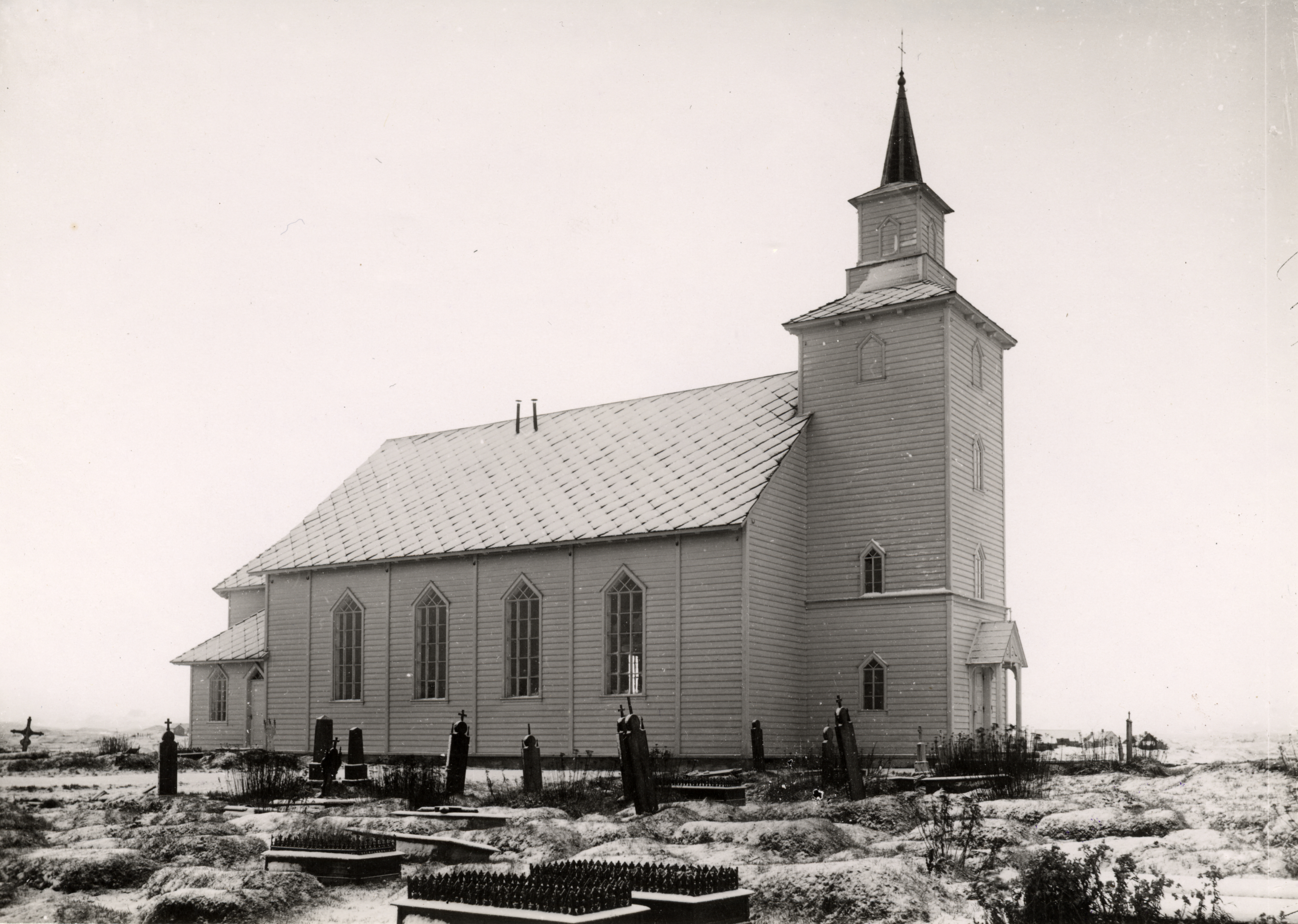
- View of the church
- Torvastad Church
- 59.380025°N 5.231749°E
- Location: Karmøy Municipality, Rogaland
- Country: Norway
- Denomination: Church of Norway
- Churchmanship: Evangelical Lutheran

History
- Status: Parish church
- Founded: 12th century
- Consecrated: 13 Oct 1880

Architecture
- Functional status: Active
- Architect: Ole Vangberg
- Architectural type: Long church
- Completed: 1880

Specifications
- Capacity: 450
- Materials: Wood

Administration
- Diocese: Stavanger bispedømme
- Deanery: Karmøy prosti
- Parish: Torvastad
- Norwegian Cultural Heritage Site
- Type: Church
- Status: Protected
- ID: 85655

Torvastad Church (Norwegian: Torvastad kyrkje) is a parish church of the Church of Norway in Karmøy Municipality in Rogaland county, Norway. It is located in the village of Torvastad on the northern part of the island of Karmøy. It is the church for the Torvastad parish which is part of the Karmøy prosti (deanery) in the Diocese of Stavanger. The white, wooden church was built in a long church design in 1880 using designs by the architect Ole Ottesen Vangberg. The church seats about 450 people.

== History ==
The earliest existing historical records of the church date back to the year 1301, but it was likely built during the 12th century. A carved dragon head was found inside a wall during a renovation in the 17th century which was dated to the 1100s, which is the basis for the likelihood of the church's original construction around that time. The first church at Torvastad was likely a stave church. During the 1620s, major repairs were undertaken, but they were not long-lasting. In 1635, the church was torn down and replaced with a small timber-framed church on a location slightly to the northwest of the present site of the church.

In 1814, this church served as an election church (Norwegian: valgkirke). Together with more than 300 other parish churches across Norway, it was a polling station for elections to the 1814 Norwegian Constituent Assembly which wrote the Constitution of Norway. This was Norway's first national elections. Each church parish was a constituency that elected people called "electors" who later met together in each county to elect the representatives for the assembly that was to meet at Eidsvoll Manor later that year.

In 1880, the old church was torn down and a new, larger church was built about 40 metres (130 ft) southeast of the old site of the church. The new building was consecrated on 13 October 1880. The site of the church was cleared and turned into a cemetery.

== Media gallery ==
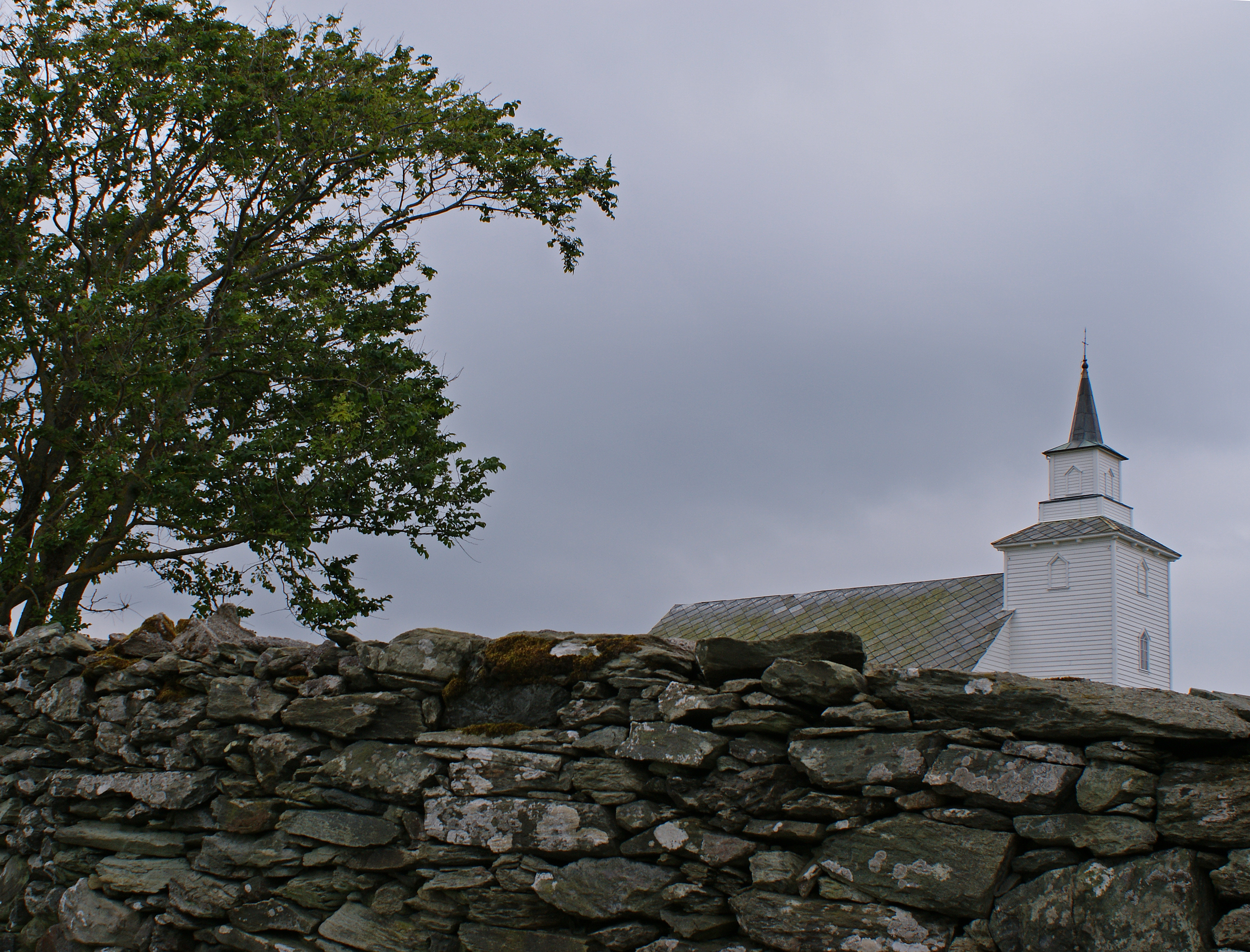

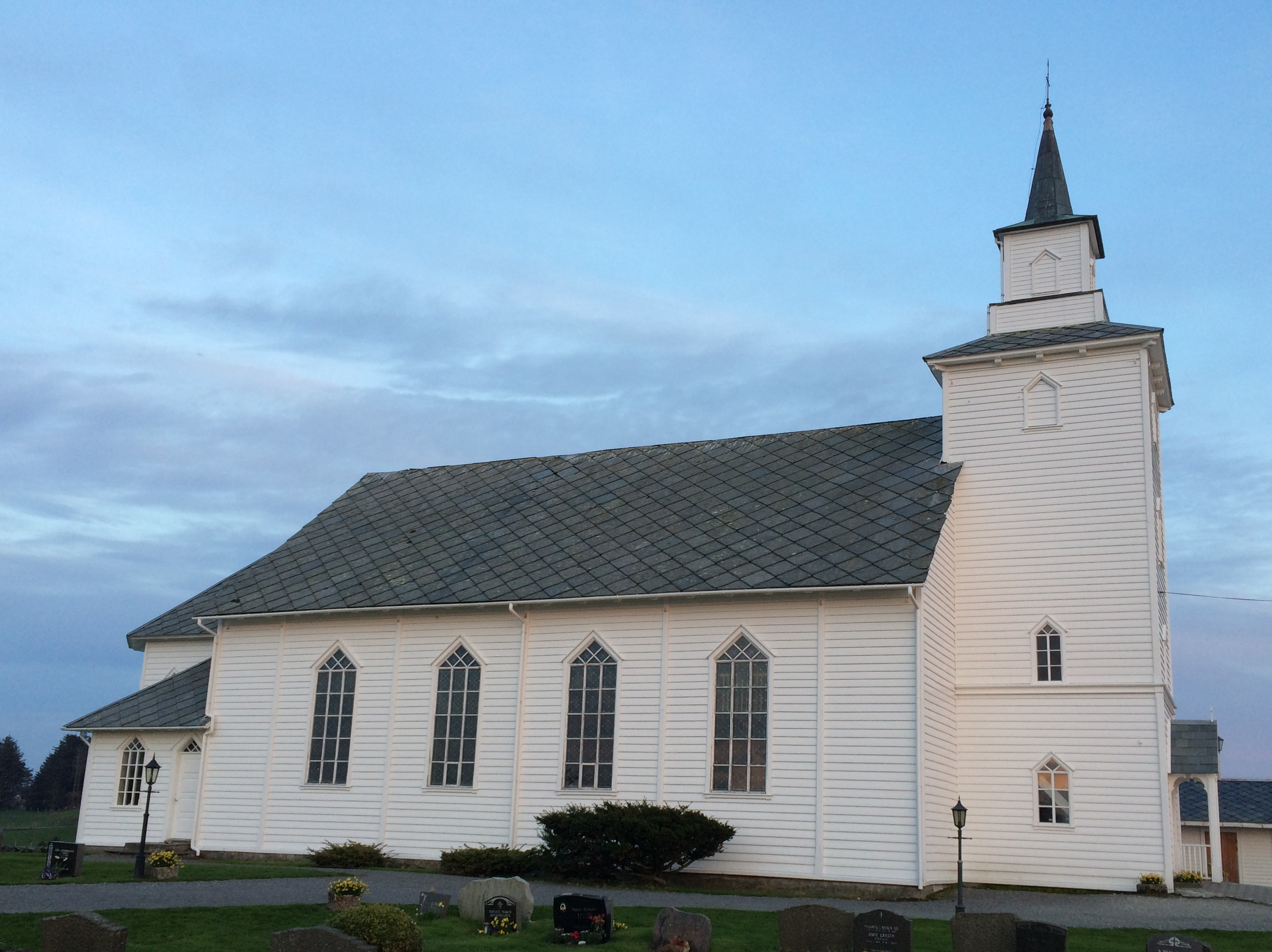

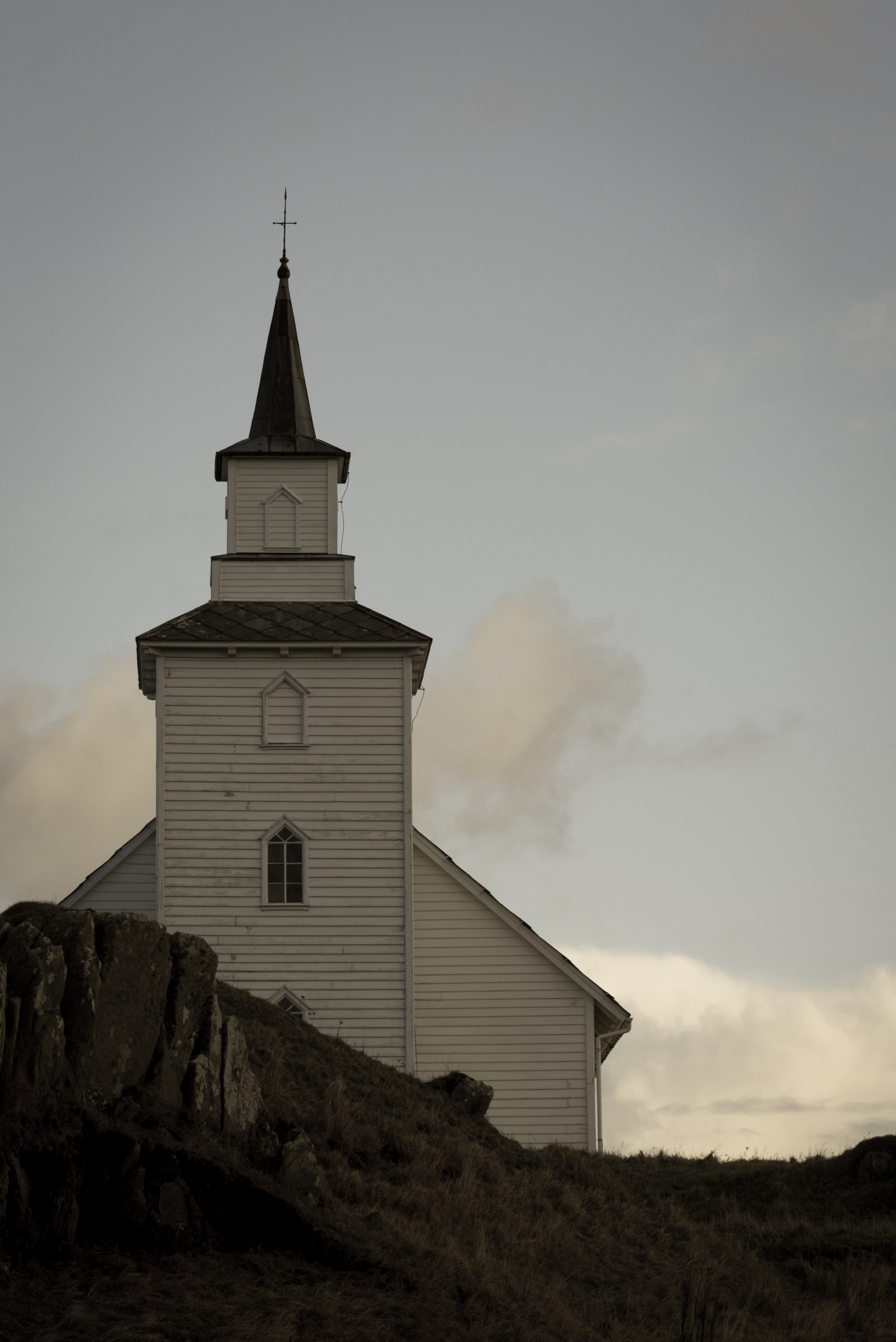

== See also ==
- List of churches in Rogaland
