= Torvastad =

Village in Karmøy Municipality, Norway

- Village
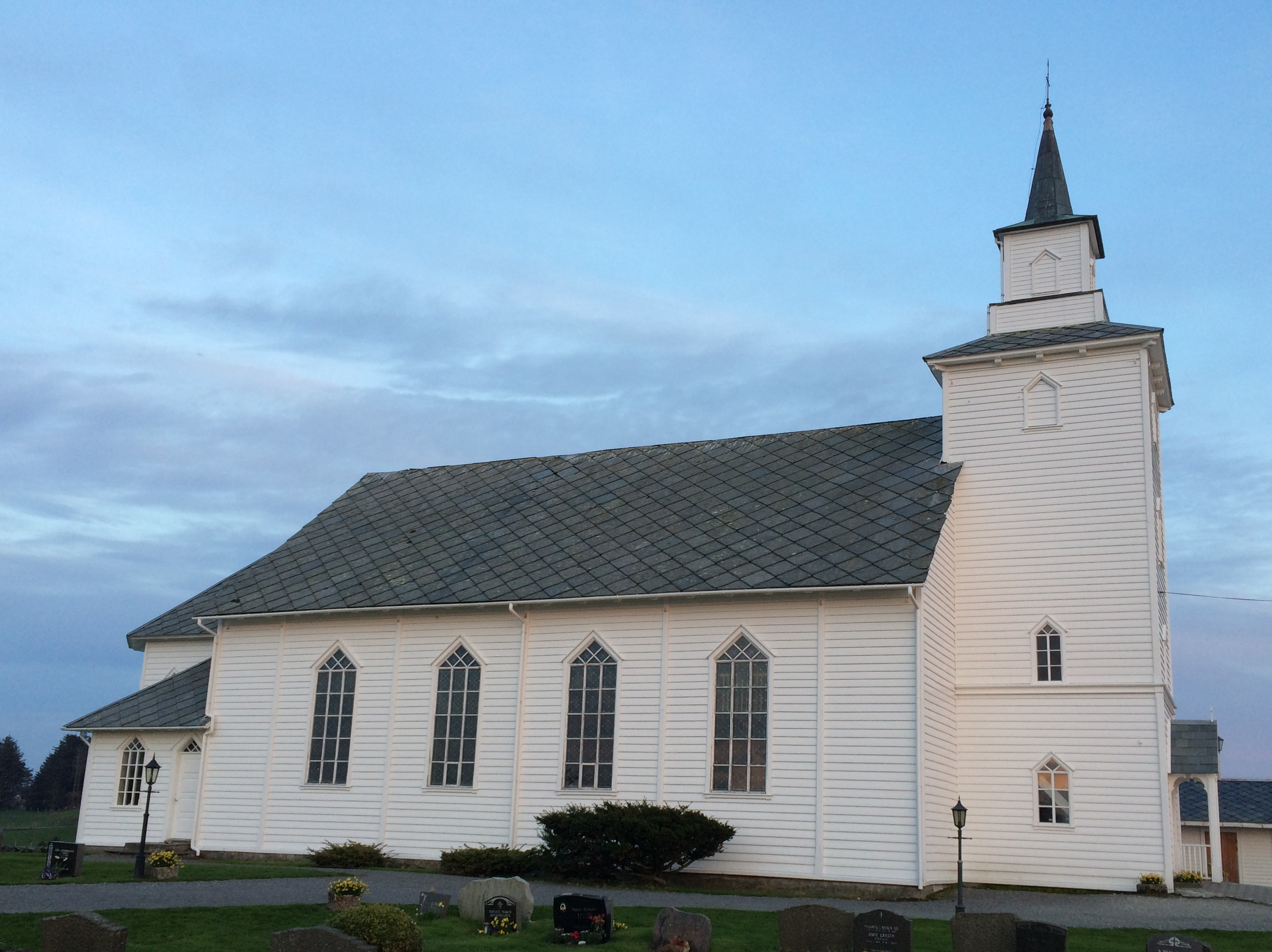
- View of the village church
- Interactive map of Torvastad
- Coordinates: 59.37968°N 5.23597°E
- Country: Norway
- Region: Western Norway
- County: Vestland
- District: Haugaland
- Municipality: Karmøy Municipality
- Elevation: 18 m (59 ft)
- Time zone: UTC+01:00 (CET)
  - Summer (DST): UTC+02:00 (CEST)
- Post Code: 4260 Torvastad

Torvastad is a village in Karmøy Municipality in Rogaland county, Norway. The village is located on the northwestern shore of the island of Karmøy. The village lies about 5 kilometres (3.1 mi) southwest of the town of Haugesund and about 4 kilometres (2.5 mi) to the northwest of the village of Avaldsnes. The islands of Feøy lie about 4 kilometres (2.5 mi) offshore to the west. Torvastad Church is located in the village. Torvastad IL is based in the village as well.

== History ==
The village was the administrative centre of the old Torvastad Municipality which existed until 1965.
