= Sandve =

Village in Karmøy Municipality, Norway

- Village
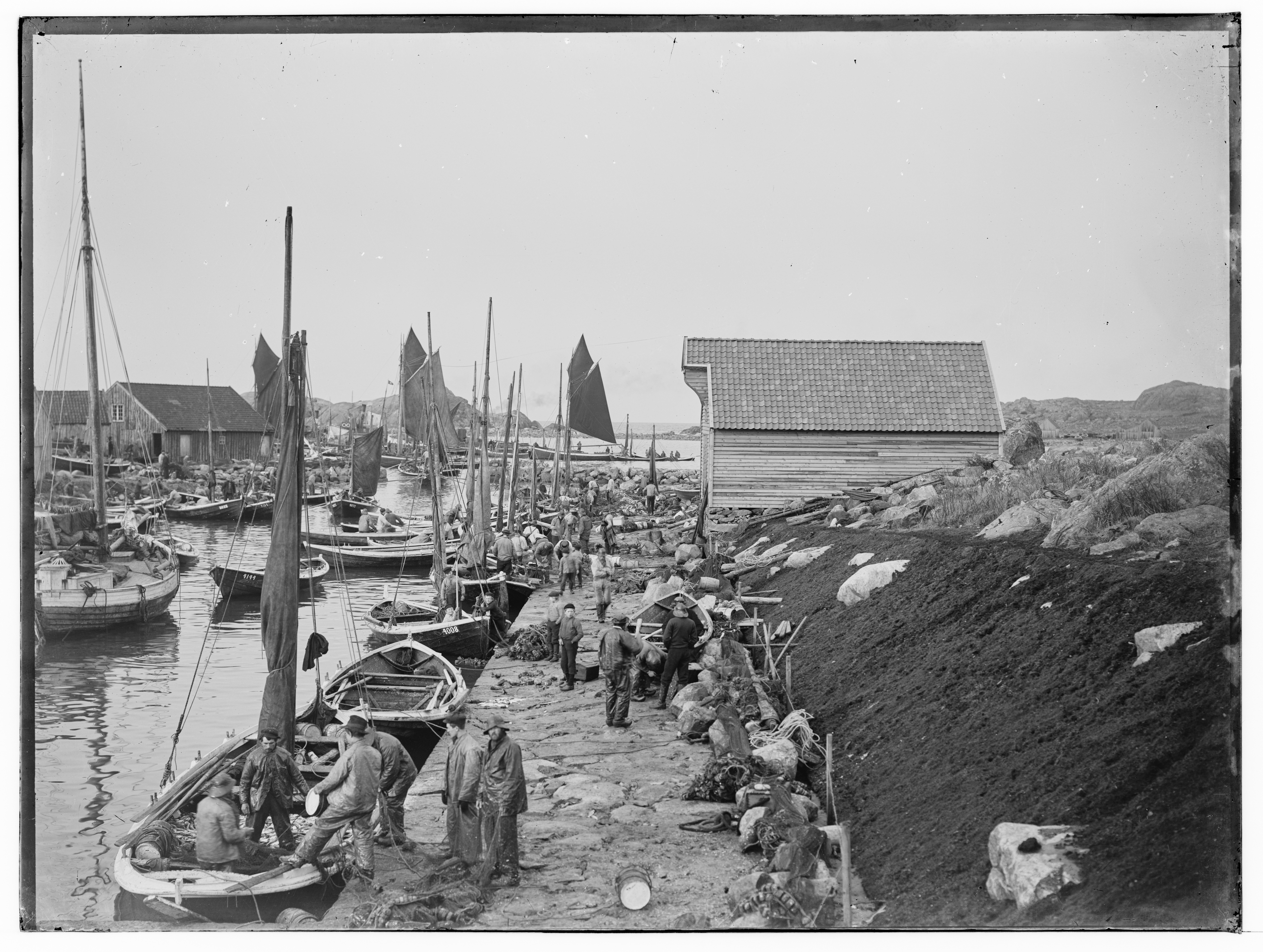
- View of the village harbour (c. 1900)
- Interactive map of Sandve
- Coordinates: 59.17523°N 5.19586°E
- Country: Norway
- Region: Western Norway
- County: Rogaland
- District: Haugaland
- Municipality: Karmøy Municipality

Area
  - Total: 0.39 km^{2} (0.15 sq mi)
- Elevation: 19 m (62 ft)

Population (2025)
  - Total: 329
  - Density: 844/km^{2} (2,190/sq mi)
- Time zone: UTC+01:00 (CET)
  - Summer (DST): UTC+02:00 (CEST)
- Post Code: 4272 Sandve

Sandve is a village in Karmøy Municipality in Rogaland county, Norway. The village is located on the southwestern part of the island of Karmøy, north of the town of Skudeneshavn, and it faces the Atlantic Ocean to the west.

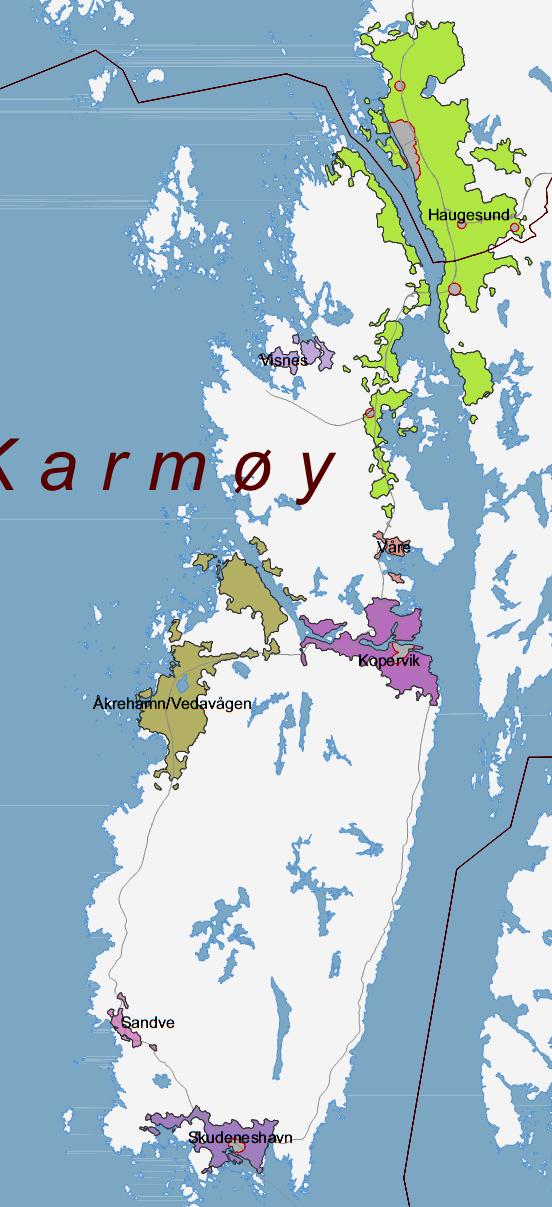
View of the urban areas on the island

The 0.39-square-kilometre (96-acre) village has a population of 329 in 2025 and a population density of 844 inhabitants per square kilometre (2,190/sq mi).

== History ==
During World War II, the Wehrmacht bombed this village because of connections to the Allied forces.
