= Geitungen Lighthouse =

Coastal lighthouse in Rogaland, Norway

Geitungen Lighthouse Geitungen Fyrstasjon
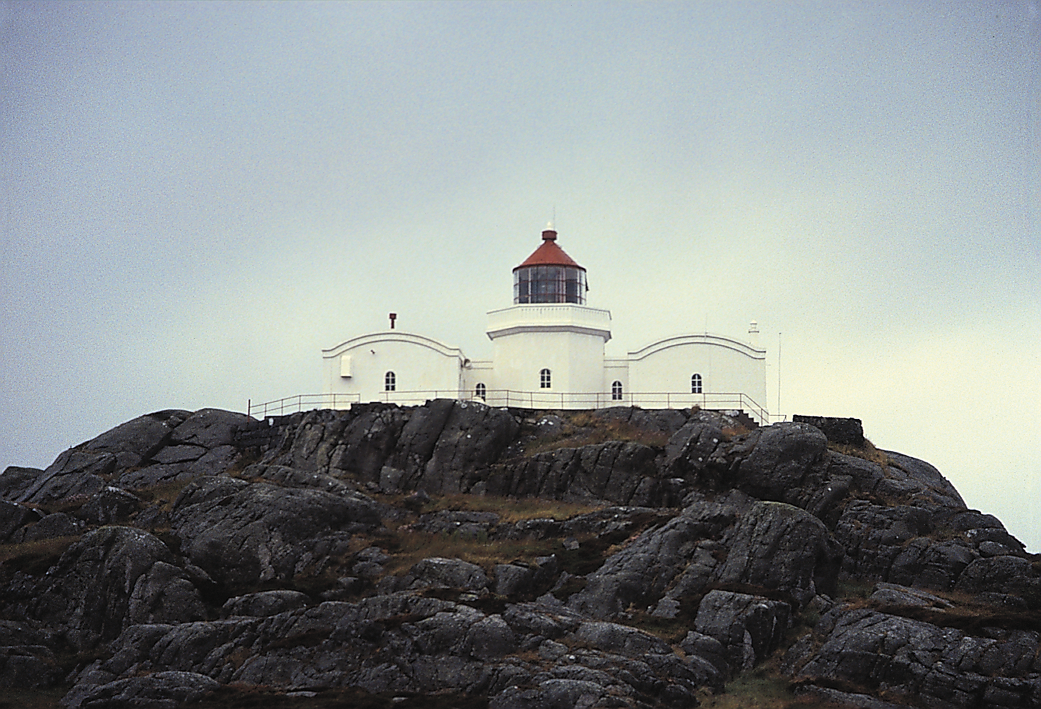
- Geitungen Lighthouse
- Location: Karmøy Municipality; Rogaland, Norway
- Coordinates: 59°07′53″N 5°14′34″E

Tower
- Constructed: 1924
- Construction: masonry tower
- Automated: 1994
- Height: 11 m (36 ft)
- Shape: octagonal tower
- Markings: white tower, red lantern roof
- Operator: Haugesund Turistforening
- Heritage: cultural property
- Racon: G

Light
- Focal height: 41 m (135 ft)
- Range: 17 nmi (31 km; 20 mi) (white)
- Characteristic: OC WRG 6s
- Norway no.: 126500

Geitungen Lighthouse (Norwegian: Geitungen fyr) is a coastal lighthouse in Karmøy Municipality in Rogaland county, Norway. The lighthouse is located on a small island about 1 kilometre (0.62 mi) off the southern tip of the main island of Karmøy. The entrance to the harbor of the town of Skudeneshavn lies about 3 kilometres (1.9 mi) northeast of the lighthouse. The island is accessible only by boat. The lighthouse was established in 1924 and it was automated in 1994. It was listed as a protected site in 1998.

== Technical specifications ==
The 11-metre (36 ft) tall lighthouse emits a white, red or green light, depending on direction, occulting once every six seconds. The light sits at an elevation of 41 metres (135 ft) above sea level on top of an octagonal prism tower. The concrete masonry tower is attached to a U-shaped one-story lighthouse keeper's house. The lighthouse is painted white and the roof is red. The lighthouse also emits a racon signal, using the morse code letter "G". The racon signal can be received inside a 1.13-nautical-mile (2.09 km; 1.30 mi) radius of the lighthouse.

== History ==
The lighthouse was established in 1924 as a replacement for Skudenes Lighthouse, which had operated from 1799 to 1924.

Geitungen Lighthouse was designed by Jørgen H. Meinich, who later also designed Makkaur Lighthouse. The argument for a new location, was the need for a foghorn. The diaphone at Geitungen Lighthouse was the first diaphone installed in Norway. Geitungen was automated and depopulated in 1994, and was listed as a protected site in 1998. The protected site includes the lighthouse and three technical buildings.

== Tourist station ==
The living house associated with Geitungen Lighthouse is operated as a tourist station by the Norwegian Trekking Association, through its Haugesund chapter (Haugesund Turistforening). It has 35 beds available for visitors. The site is only accessible by boat.

== See also ==
- Lighthouses in Norway
- List of lighthouses in Norway
