= Norheim, Rogaland =

Village in Karmøy Municipality, Norway

Norheim Nordheim
- Village
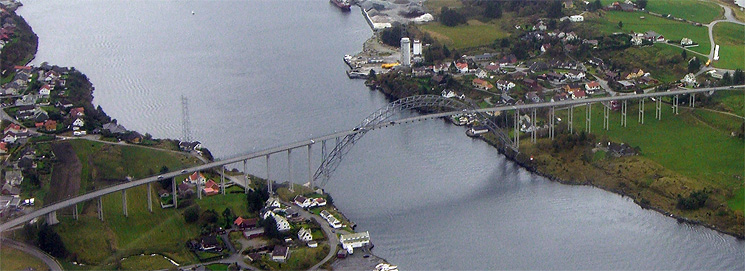
- View of the village (left side) with the Karmsund Bridge
- Interactive map of Norheim
- Coordinates: 59.37991°N 5.31228°E
- Country: Norway
- Region: Western Norway
- County: Rogaland
- District: Haugaland
- Municipality: Karmøy Municipality
- Elevation: 30 m (98 ft)
- Time zone: UTC+01:00 (CET)
  - Summer (DST): UTC+02:00 (CEST)
- Post Code: 5542 Karmsund

Norheim is a village in Karmøy Municipality in Rogaland county, Norway. The village is located along the Karmsundet strait immediately south of the town of Haugesund, just over the municipal border inside Karmøy Municipality. The village lies along the European route E134 highway and on the eastern end of the Karmsund Bridge which connects Norheim (on the mainland) to the island of Karmøy.

The village of Norheim is the site of the Oasen mall, the largest shopping centre in Karmøy. Norheim Church is also located in the village. The Norheimskogen forest lies south of Norheim with the village of Vormedal on the other side of the forest to the south. Norheim is also home to the football club called Nord, founded in 1932. The eastern edge of Norheim is known as Spanne. The southern coastal part of Norheim is known as Moksheim.
