= Aase Simonsen =

Norwegian politician (born 1962)

Aase Simonsen (born 1 July 1962) is a Norwegian politician for the Conservative Party.

She served as a deputy representative to the Parliament of Norway from Rogaland during the term 2017–2021.

She has been an elected member of the Rogaland county council and from 2011 to 2015 the mayor of Karmøy Municipality.
