= Oasen =

Shopping mall in Norway

Coordinates: 59°22′38″N 5°18′27″E

Oasen Storsenter is a shopping centre in Norheim in Karmøy Municipality, Norway. In 2014 it had a turnover of 688 million Norwegian kroner. It has 65 stores in 33,000 m^{2} of building space (18,500 m^{2} of commercial space). In addition to this there are 28 services within health and well-being.

== History ==
After Karmøy Municipality was founded as a result of merging several municipalities in 1965, a fairly large part of the new municipality was located on the mainland, and within a few years became the quickest growing part of Karmøy. Unlike the various villages on the island proper, the mainland lacked a centralized area for shops and businesses. Oasen Storsenter opened as the first one in the region in 1977. During the first year the shopping centre only had 6000 m^{2} available, but this was expanded to 10,000 m^{2} in 1978, with further expansions in 1985, 1996, 2002 and 2014.

Oasen Storsenter was bought by Olav Thon in 1998 for 160 million kroner.

== Today ==
Today the shopping centre spans three floors, with shops in the basement and first floor and a gym and various health services on the second floor.
