= Norheim Church =

Church in Rogaland, Norway

- Norheim kirke
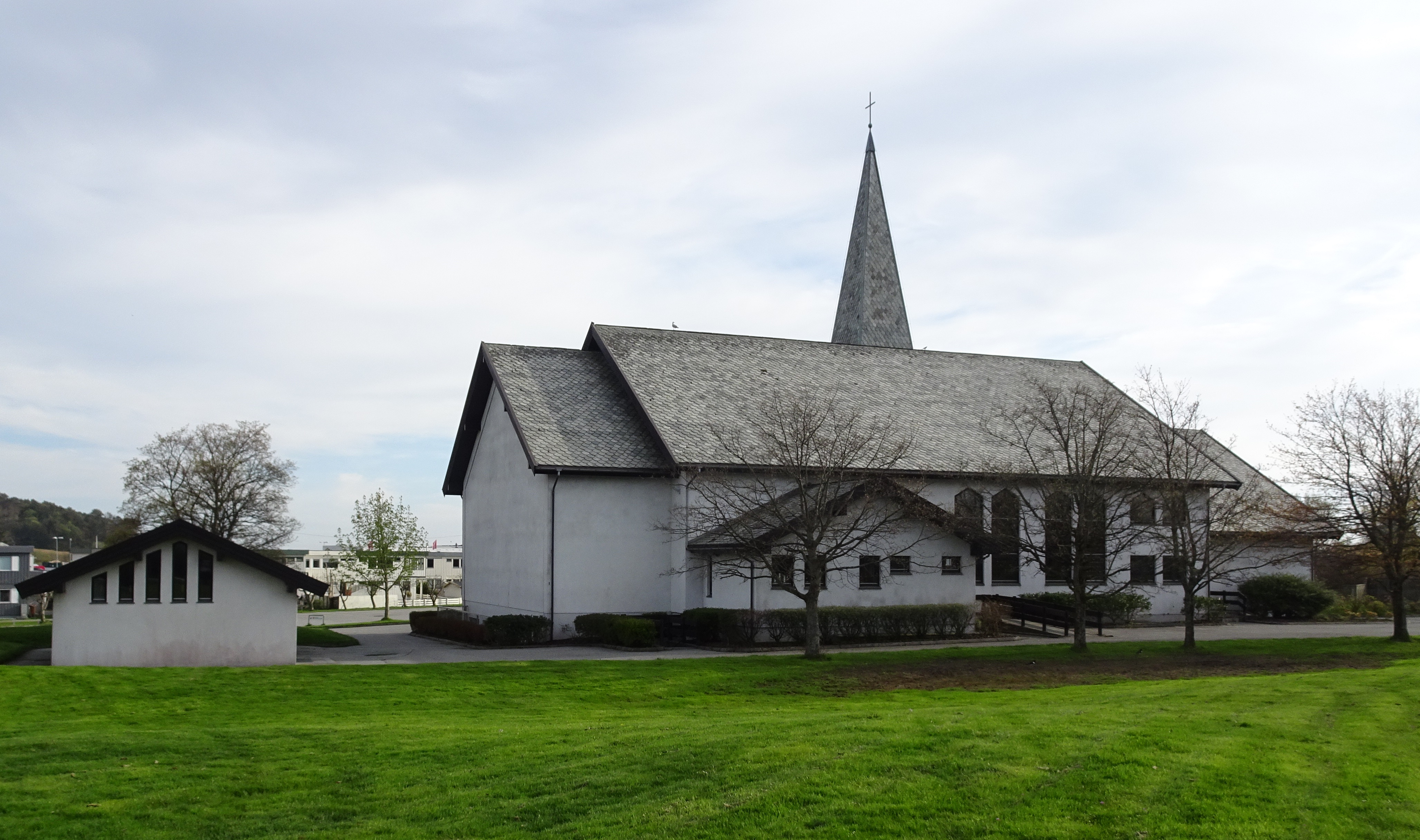
- View of the church
- Norheim Church
- 59.379777°N 5.30874°E
- Location: Karmøy Municipality, Rogaland
- Country: Norway
- Denomination: Church of Norway
- Churchmanship: Evangelical Lutheran

History
- Status: Parish church
- Founded: 1978
- Consecrated: 1978

Architecture
- Functional status: Active
- Architect: Bjarne Gjerde
- Architectural type: Rectangular
- Completed: 1978

Specifications
- Capacity: 425
- Materials: Brick

Administration
- Diocese: Stavanger bispedømme
- Deanery: Karmøy prosti
- Parish: Norheim

Norheim Church (Norwegian: Norheim kirke) is a parish church of the Church of Norway in Karmøy Municipality in Rogaland county, Norway. It is located in the village of Norheim, just south of the town of Haugesund. It is the church for the Norheim parish which is part of the Karmøy prosti (deanery) in the Diocese of Stavanger. The plastered brick church was built in a rectangular design in 1978 using designs by the architect Bjarne Gjerde. The church seats about 425 people.

== See also ==
- List of churches in Rogaland
- Information on the organ in Norheim Church (in German)
