= Jan Ivar Pedersen =

Norwegian professor of nutrition (born 1936)

Jan Ivar Pedersen (24 February 1936 – 25 July 2025) was a Norwegian professor of nutrition.

He grew up on the island of Karmøy and took his secondary education at Lycée Corneille in Rouen, France. He took the cand.med. degree in 1962 and the dr.med. degree in 1973, both at the University of Oslo. He has been employed at the University of Oslo since 1964, and was promoted to professor in 1984. He has also been a member of the Norwegian National Council on Nutrition. He is a member of the Norwegian Academy of Science and Letters since 1988 and was a Knight, First Class of the Order of St. Olav since 2007.

He is married and has two children, and resided at Stabekk. He died in July 2025, aged 89.
