= Feøy =

Island group in Rogaland, Norway

Feøy Føyno
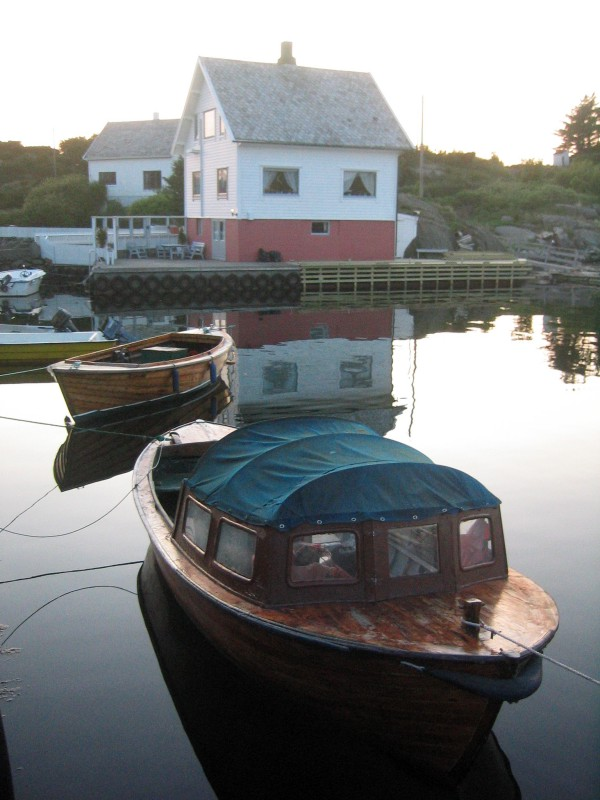
- View of Feøy harbour
- Interactive map of the island

Geography
- Location: Rogaland, Norway
- Coordinates: 59.38434°N 5.15434°E
- Area: 1.3 km^{2} (0.50 sq mi)
- Highest elevation: 32 m (105 ft)

Administration
- Norway
- County: Rogaland
- Municipality: Karmøy Municipality

Demographics
- Population: 37 (2020)

Feøy or Føyno is a small island group in Karmøy Municipality in Rogaland county, Norway. The 1.3-square-kilometre (0.50 sq mi) island group lies west of the town of Haugesund and the island of Karmøy, southeast of the islands of Røvær, and northeast of the island of Utsira.

The island has 37 permanent residents, plus a number of seasonal residents and visitors who rent vacation homes. The permanent residents who are not retired support themselves either through sheep farming, fishing, or by commuting to jobs on the mainland. There is regular ferry service between Feøy, Røvær, and Haugesund. In addition, most residents also own at least one private boat which they can use to travel to Karmøy or Haugesund.

There is an old wharf on Feøy that was converted into the Feøy Brygge, a small meeting house and restaurant that caters meetings and parties.

During World War II, the German army occupied the small island because the area was an organizing site for resistance workers moving between Norway and Britain.

== See also ==
- List of islands of Norway
