= Karmsund Bridge =

Karmsund Bridge Karmsund bru / Karmsund bro
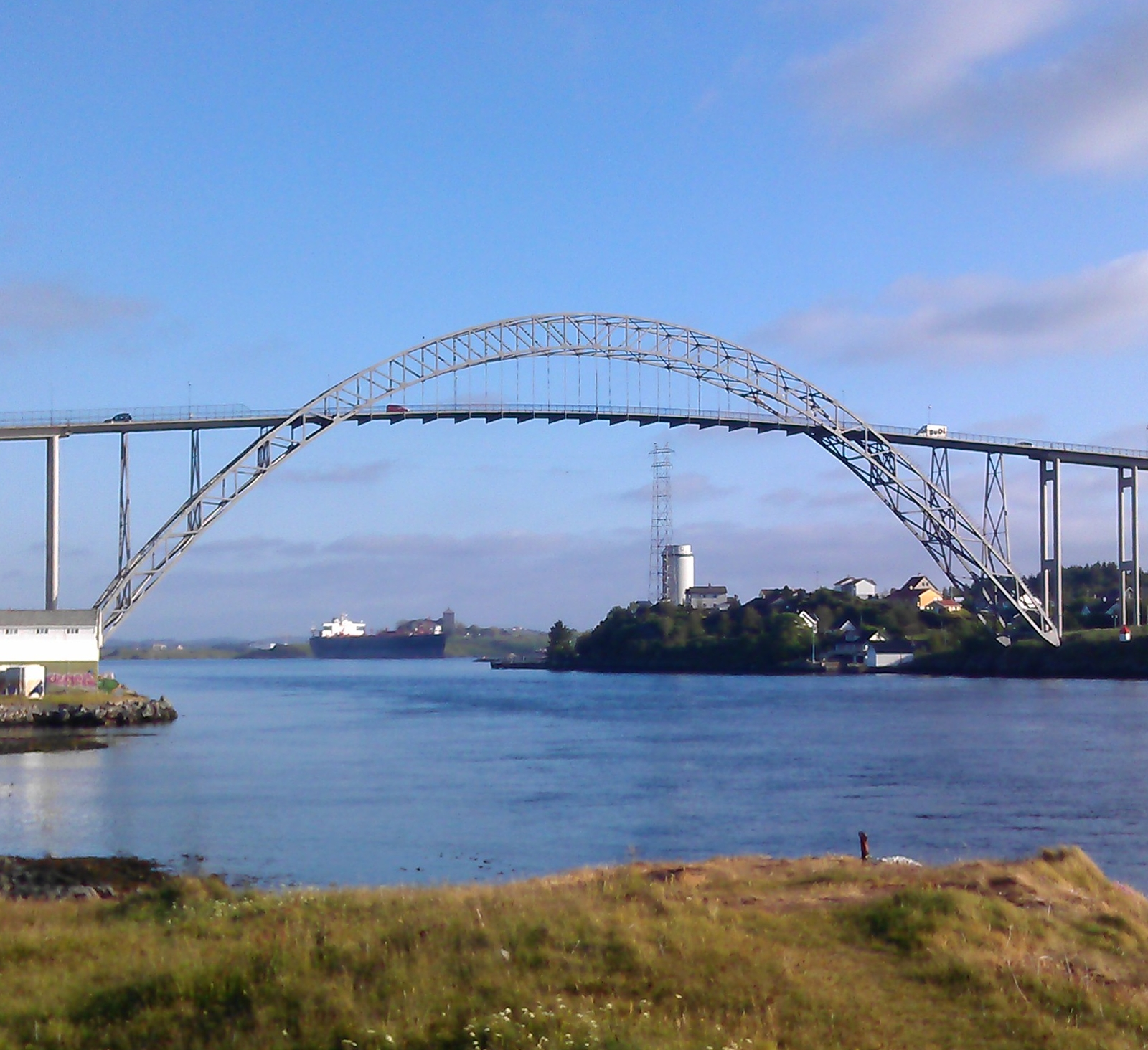
- View of the bridge
- Coordinates: 59°22′32″N 5°17′43″E
- Carries: E134
- Crosses: Karmsundet
- Locale: Karmøy Municipality

Characteristics
- Design: Arch
- Material: Steel
- Total length: 691 metres (2,267 ft)
- Longest span: 184 metres (604 ft)
- No. of spans: 37
- Clearance above: 46 metres (151 ft)

History
- Opened: 1955

Location
- Interactive map of Karmsund Bridge

Karmsund Bridge (Norwegian: Karmsund bru / Karmsund bro) is a bridge over the Karmsundet strait in Rogaland county, Norway. The bridge is located in Karmøy Municipality and it links the island of Karmøy to the Norwegian mainland. The steel arched road bridge carries the European route E134 highway. It is 691 meters (2,267 ft) in length with 46 metres (151 ft) of clearance below the bridge. There are 37 spans on the bridge and the main span is 184 meters (604 ft) wide. It was completed in 1955.

== See also ==
- List of bridges in Norway
- List of bridges in Norway by length
- List of bridges
- List of bridges by length
