= Karmsundet =

Strait in Rogaland, Norway

- Karmsund (unofficial)
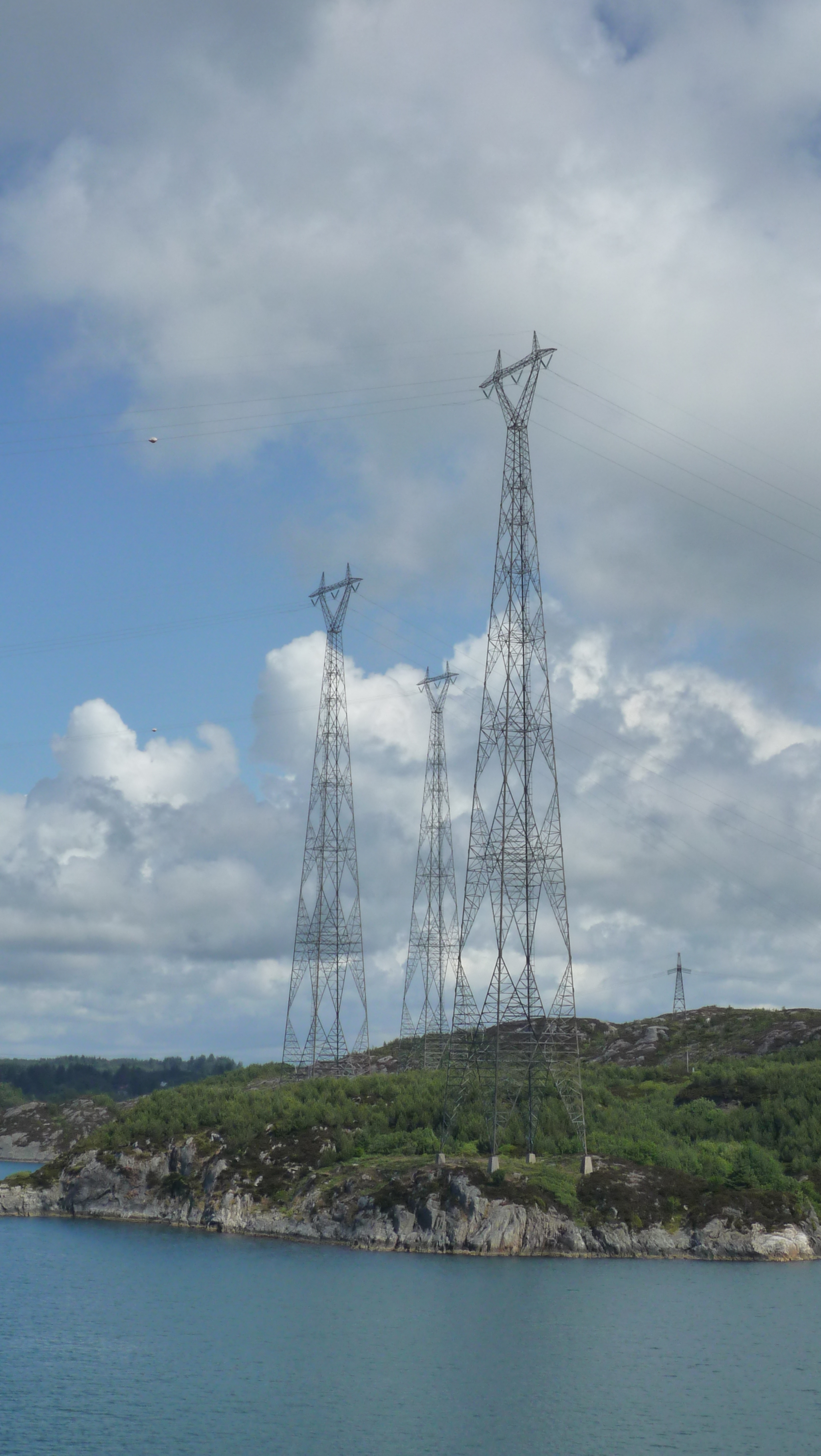
- View of the fjord and the electric pylons
- Interactive map of the fjord
- Location: Rogaland county, Norway
- Coordinates: 59.29722°N 5.32639°E
- Type: Strait
- Primary inflows: Røværsfjorden
- Primary outflows: Boknafjorden
- Basin countries: Norway
- Max. length: 30 kilometres (19 mi)
- Settlements: Haugesund, Kopervik

Karmsundet is a strait located in Rogaland county, Norway. The 30-kilometre (19 mi) long strait separates the island of Karmøy on the west and the mainland of Norway and island of Vestre Bokn in the east. The strait runs through Haugesund Municipality, Karmøy Municipality, and Bokn Municipality. The town of Haugesund lies at the northern end of the strait and the town of Kopervik lies in the central part of the strait, and the town of Skudeneshavn lies near the southern end where the strait flows into the Boknafjorden. The Karmsund Bridge, a part of the European route E134 highway, links Karmøy island to the mainland. The bridge was completed in 1955. The small islands of Vibrandsøya, Risøya, and Hasseløya lie in the strait at the northern end, just off shore from the town of Haugesund.

Near the Norsk Hydro Factory on Karmøy island, there are three powerlines that cross the Karmsundet on 143-metre (469 ft) tall electricity pylons, which are the tallest in Norway. A local newspaper in this area is named after the strait: Karmsund Avis.

== History ==
The eddic poem Grímnismál says that Thor, the weather god, wades the straits at Karmsundet every morning on his way to Yggdrasil, the tree of life.

Standing above Karmsundet, near the town of Haugesund, is Haraldshaugen, a monument commemorating the traditional burial site for several early Norwegian rulers, including Harald I.

The professor in philology Magnus Olsen wrote that the name of the country Norway, which means the northbound route, refers to the inner-archipelago sailing route, which begins at Karmsund, and originally to the southernmost part of this sailing route, the home area of Harald Fairhair, the first king of Norway.
