= Karmøy Municipality =

Municipality in Rogaland, Norway

Karmøy Municipality Karmøy kommune
- Municipality
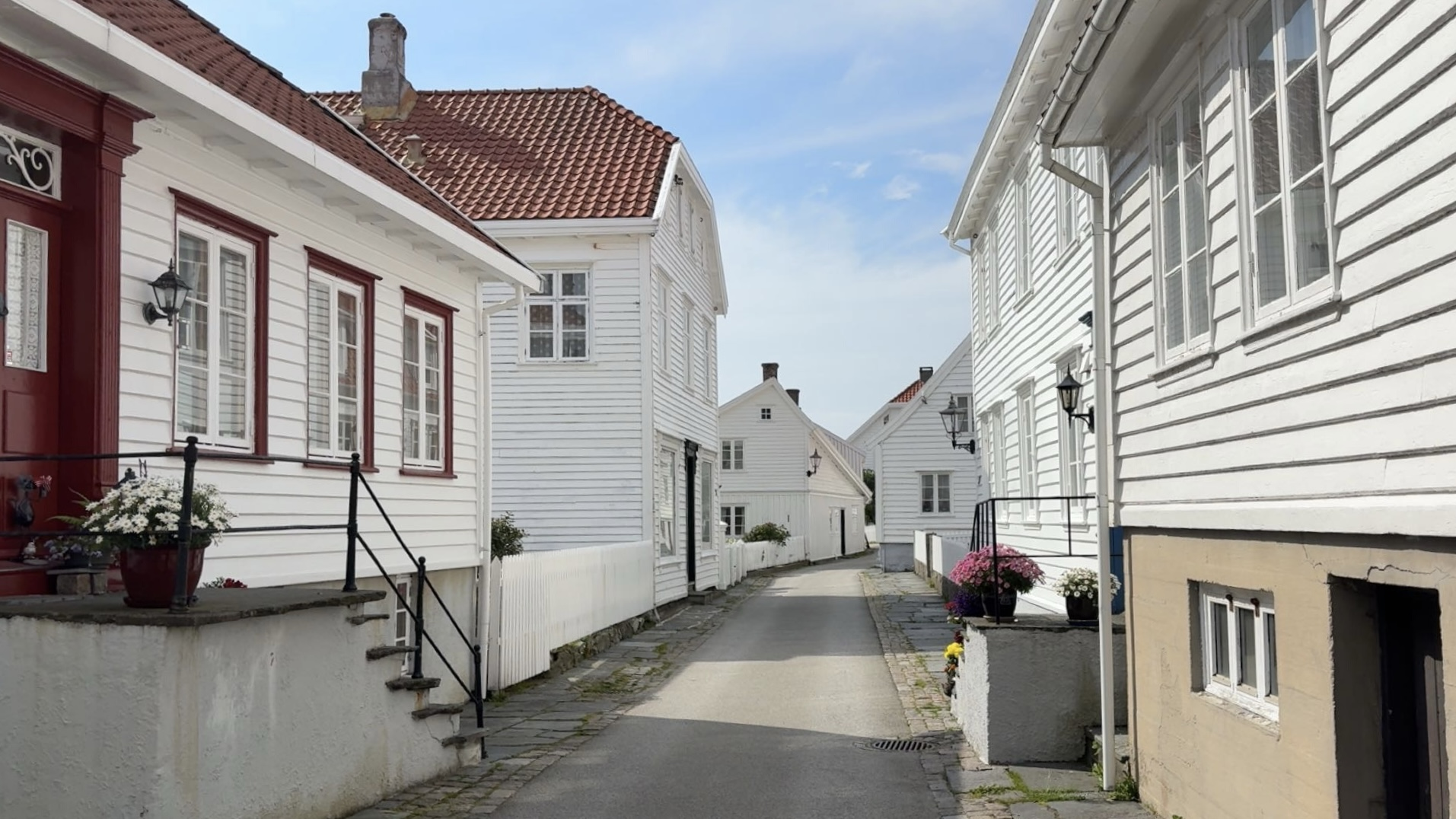
- Søragadå, Skudeneshavn

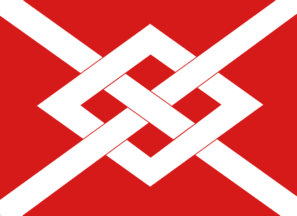
- Flag Coat of arms

- Rogaland within Norway

- Karmøy within Rogaland
- Coordinates: 59°15′23″N 05°14′57″E
- Country: Norway
- County: Rogaland
- District: Haugaland
- Established: 1 Jan 1965
- Administrative centre: Kopervik

Government
  - Mayor (2023): Leiv Arne Marhaug (H)

Area
  - Total: 230.01 km^{2} (88.81 sq mi)
  - Land: 219.46 km^{2} (84.73 sq mi)
  - Water: 10.55 km^{2} (4.07 sq mi) 4.6%
  - Rank: #295 in Norway
- Highest elevation: 171.58 m (562.9 ft)

Population (2026)
  - Total: 43,990
  - Rank: #26 in Norway
  - Density: 191.3/km^{2} (495/sq mi)
  - Change (10 years): ▲ +4.3%
- Demonym(s): Karmøybu; Kartabu

Official language
  - Norwegian form: Neutral
- Time zone: UTC+01:00 (CET)
  - Summer (DST): UTC+02:00 (CEST)
- ISO 3166 code: NO-1149
- Website: Official website

Karmøy is a municipality in Rogaland county, Norway. It is the most populated municipality in both the traditional district of Haugaland and the Haugesund Region, a statistical metropolitan area. Karmøy Municipality was established in 1965 upon the merger of seven former municipalities. It has three towns: Kopervik on the east coast of the main island, which is the administrative centre, Åkrehamn on the west coast, and Skudeneshavn at the southern tip. There are also many notable villages including Avaldsnes, Eike, Ferkingstad, Kolnes, Norheim, Sandve, Torvastad, Veavågen, Visnes, and Vormedal.

Karmøy Municipality is Rogaland county's third most populous municipality, only Stavanger Municipality and Sandnes Municipality are more populous. The 230.01-square-kilometre (88.81 sq mi) municipality is the 295th largest by area out of the 357 municipalities in Norway. Karmøy Municipality is the 26th most populous municipality in Norway with a population of 43,990. The municipality's population density is 191.3 inhabitants per square kilometre (495/sq mi) and its population has increased by 4.3% over the previous 10-year period.

Karmøy Municipality encompasses several islands and a smaller mainland area. The largest island, also named Karmøy, has an area of 177.9-square-kilometre (68.7 sq mi), making it the largest island in Rogaland and the 23rd largest in Norway. The island is connected to the mainland by the Karmsund Bridge and the Karmøy Tunnel. Approximately 34,100 of the municipality's inhabitants live on the island, making it the most populous island in South Norway and the second most populous in the country, while around 10,000 reside on the mainland, among them in the settlements of Norheim and Vormedal. The municipality is also noted for its industries and fishing, as well as for its heather moors and white sand surfing beaches.

== General information ==
The municipality of Karmøy is a recent creation. During the 1960s, there were many municipal mergers across Norway due to the work of the Schei Committee. On 1 January 1965, Karmøy Municipality was created upon the merger of two towns and parts of five municipalities into one large municipality with 23,217 residents. The areas that were merged were:

- the town of Kopervik (population: 1,737)
- the town of Skudeneshavn (population: 1,275)
- all of Skudenes Municipality (population: 3,583)
- all of Stangaland Municipality (population: 2,678)
- all of Åkra Municipality (population: 6,008)
- most of Avaldsnes Municipality (population: 4,153), except for the parts east of the Førresfjorden which went to Tysvær Municipality
- most of Torvastad Municipality (population: 3,783), except for the island of Vibrandsøy which went to Haugesund Municipality

=== Name ===
The municipality is named after the island of Karmøy (Old Norse: Kǫrmt), since the majority of the municipality is located on this island. The first element is derived from the word karmr which means "bargeboard", likely in the sense of a "sheltering island". The last element, øy which means "island", was added later.

=== Coat of arms ===
The coat of arms was granted on 18 April 1975. The official blazon is "Gules, a fret argent" (Norwegian: I rødt et sølv gitterkryss). This means the arms have a red field (background) and the ordinary is a fret (a diamond interwoven with a cross). The ordinary has a tincture of argent which means it is commonly colored white, but if it is made out of metal, then silver is used. The design is canting, as the central diamond shape stands for karm (which is Norwegian for a "frame"). The island forms a border (or frame) against the sea and protects the inland areas from its forces. The cross in the design symbolizes the local Avaldsnes Church that was the royal chapel here during the Middle Ages. The island is said to be a central location and medieval kings would often choose to stay there to be able to "get everywhere in haste" if needed. The arms were designed by Magnus Hardeland. The municipal flag has the same design as the coat of arms.

== History ==
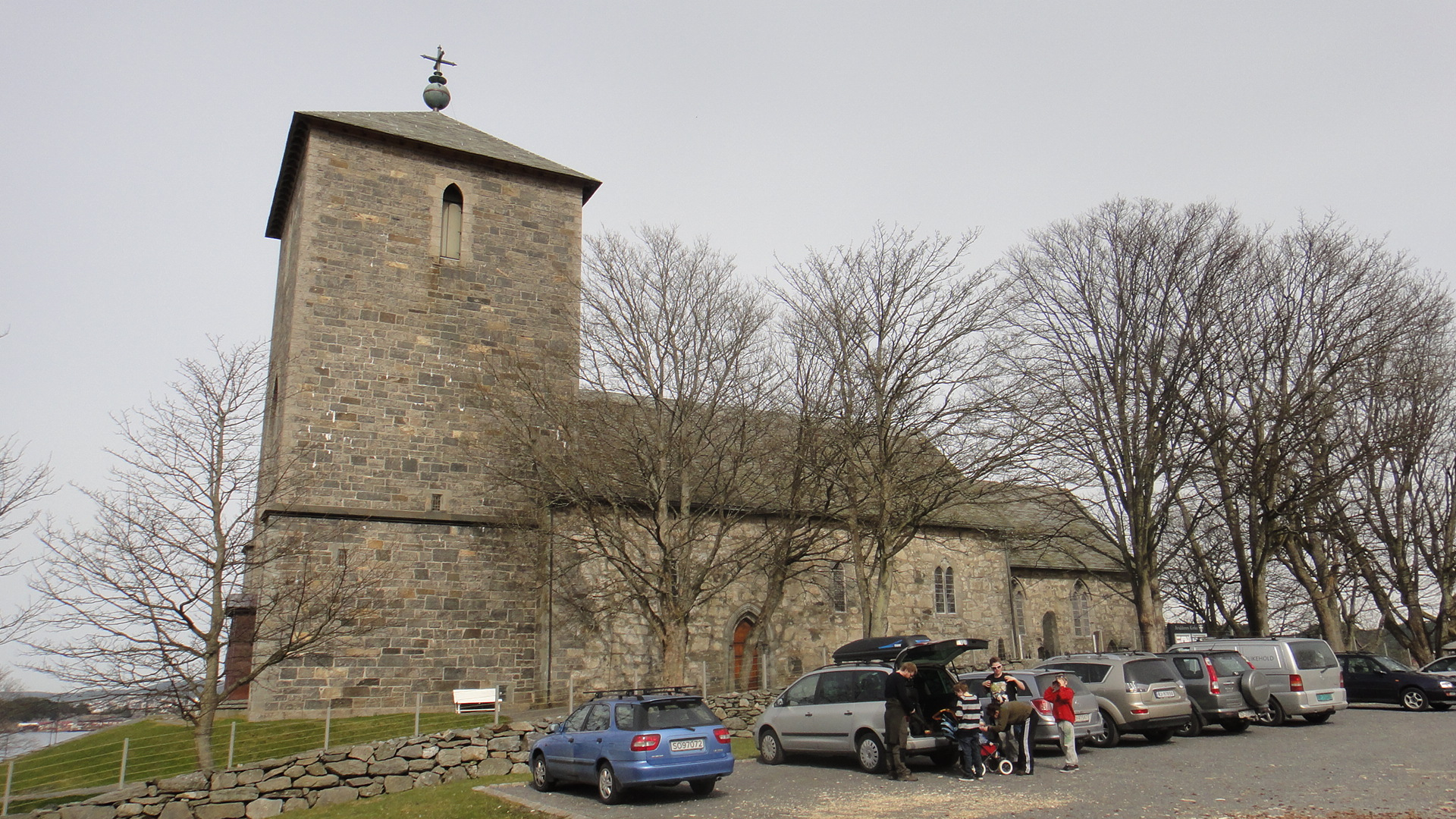
View of the historic Avaldsnes Church

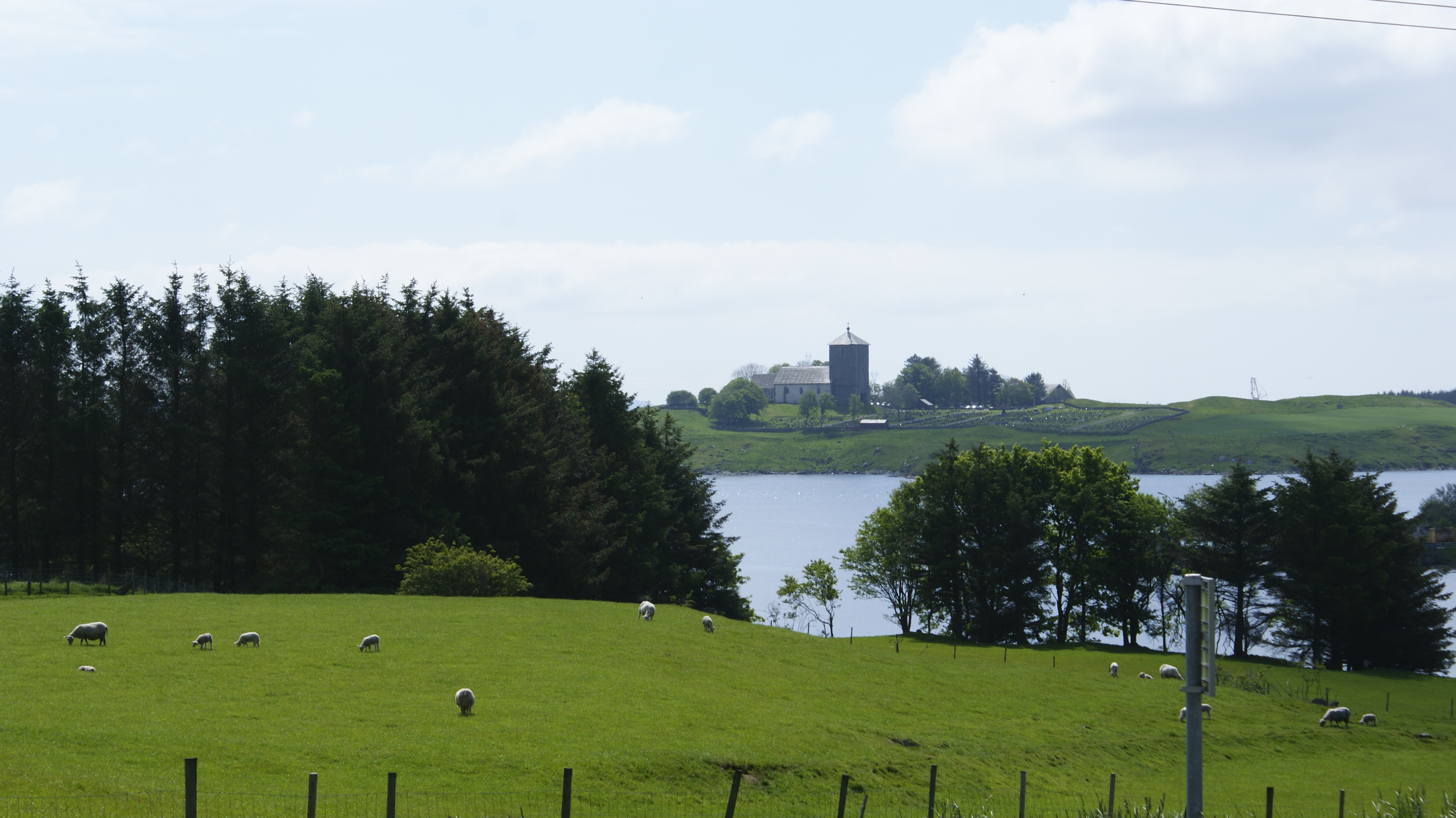
Island pastures and St. Olav's church

There are several finds from the Stone Age, Bronze Age and Iron Age. Large burial mounds, stone monuments, and many other ancient monuments are found on the island. Karmøy is the site of the Storhaug, Grønhaug, and Flagghaugen burial mounds.

Karmøy was known for sailing in the old times. The eddic poem Grímnismál says that Thor, the weather god, wades the Karmsundet strait every morning on his way to Yggdrasil, the tree of life. The ocean outside Karmøy is dangerous, filled with underwater currents and rocks. Thus the ships were forced into the narrow Karmsundet. Chieftains and kings controlled the ships passing up and down the coast and demanded taxes.

The Karmsundet strait was also the source of the name of the kingdom, at the time when the first king of the unified Norway, Harald Fairhair, lived on Karmøy. (See History of Norway.)

Avaldsnes is located on the northeastern coast of the island. King Augvald who has given his name to this ancient site is mentioned in the Old Norse sagas as having his home here. Later the residence of Harald Fairhair and other kings are mentioned. There is also a medieval church, St. Olav's church of Avaldsnes, located on this coast.

Visnes, a village in the northwest of Karmøy was once the site of an important copper mine. This mine was source of the copper used for the Statue of Liberty in New York City.

In the 18th century, two girls from Uyea in Shetland rowed to Haaf Gruney to milk some of the cows grazing there. Unfortunately, their return was marred by a strong storm, and eventually they found their tiny boat blown to Karmøy. The Uyea girls ended up marrying Karmøy men, and their descendants still live there. The Dyrland family of Karmoy are believed to be the family that the two girls married into after they arrived on Karmøy. Sivert Dyrland was a member of the Norwegian government in the early 20th century.

== Geography ==
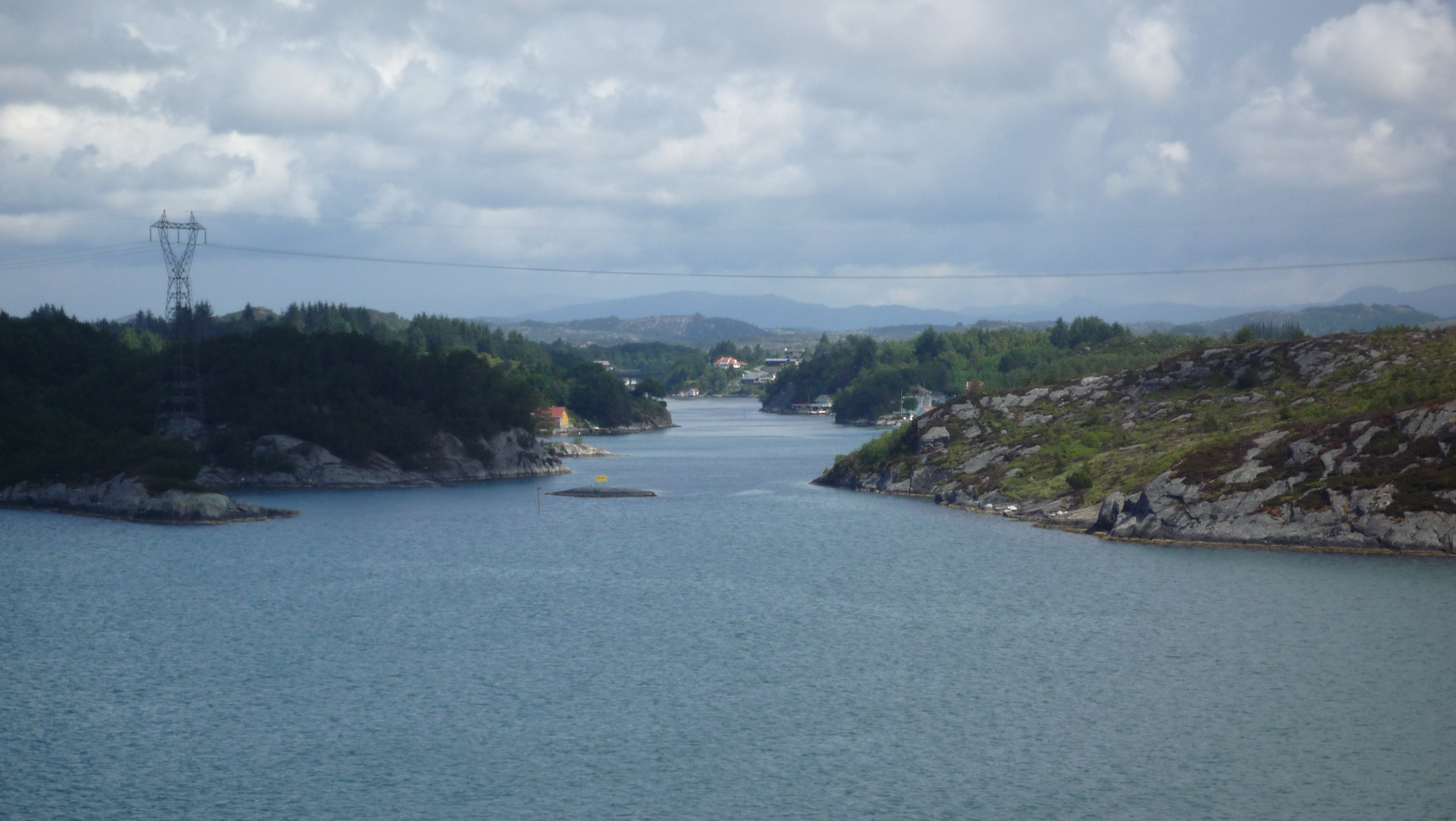
View of the Låvesundet

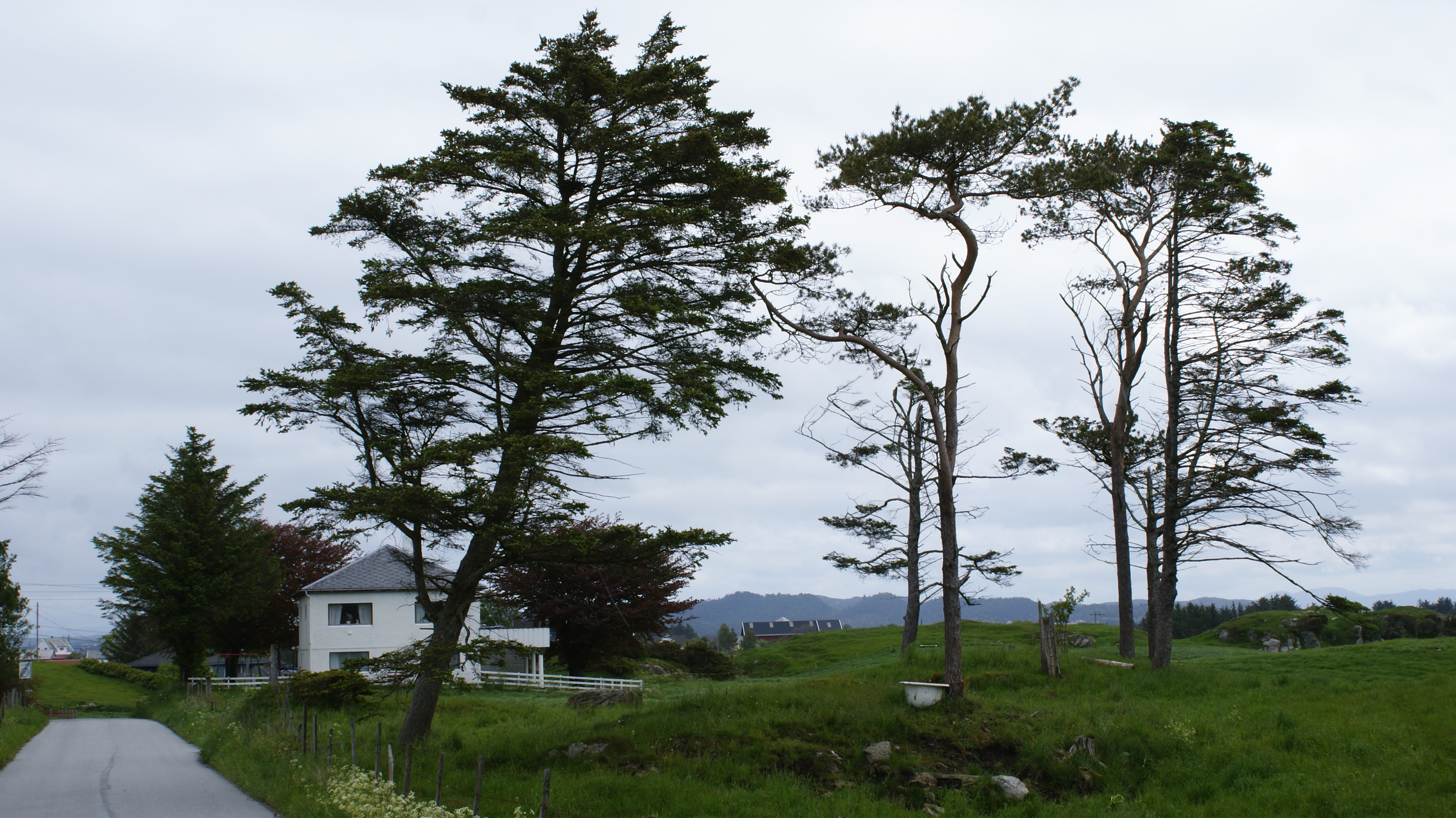
Farm on Karmøy

The majority of the municipality is located on the large island of Karmøy, but it also includes the mainland peninsula between the Karmsundet strait and Førresfjorden, plus the island of Feøy and several other small islands. It borders Haugesund Municipality to the northwest, Tysvær Municipality to the northeast, Bokn Municipality to the east across the sea, Kvitsøy Municipality to the south, and Utsira Municipality to the west.

The natural and cultural landscape is highly heterogeneous, encompassing chalk-white sands, moorland, and several piers around the island. The landscape in the north is mainly agricultural, while large parts of the inland south are heather moors. The island has many white, sandy beaches facing the North Sea, attracting surfers as one of the top spots for windsurfing in Norway. The highest point in the municipality is the 171.58-metre (562.9 ft) tall mountain Dyrafjellet, just west of the village of Skre.

Towns and villages are mostly located along the coast. The three towns in Karmøy are all on the island, the administrative center Kopervik is on the east side, Åkrehamn is on the west side, while Skudeneshavn is on the southern tip. On the mainland part of Karmøy, the village of Norheim is contiguous with the neighboring town of Haugesund. To the south of Norheim is the village of Vormedal while the village of Kolnes is in the northeastern part of mainland Karmøy.

Haugesund Airport is also located on the island rather than in the town of Haugesund proper. The Geitungen Lighthouse lies at the southern end of the municipality, marking the entrance to the Boknafjorden.

=== Climate ===
Karmøy has an oceanic climate (Cfb), also known as marine west coast climate, with rainy winters and warm or mild summers, and a long frost-free season for the latitude. The all-time high 31.2 °C (88.2 °F) was recorded July 2019, and the all-time low −16.6 °C (2.1 °F) was set in January 2010 (extremes since 2003). The wettest time of year is autumn and winter, while April–July is the driest season. Haugesund Airport is situated in Karmøy municipality and has been recording since 1975.

Climate data for Haugesund Airport Karmøy 1991–2020 (24 m, precipitation Haugesund-Rossabø, extremes 2003–2020)
Month	Jan	Feb	Mar	Apr	May	Jun	Jul	Aug	Sep	Oct	Nov	Dec	Year
Record high °C (°F)	10.2 (50.4)	11.5 (52.7)	16.9 (62.4)	20.8 (69.4)	30.8 (87.4)	29.4 (84.9)	31.2 (88.2)	29.6 (85.3)	25.9 (78.6)	20.2 (68.4)	15.9 (60.6)	11.6 (52.9)	31.2 (88.2)
Mean daily maximum °C (°F)	4 (39)	4 (39)	6 (43)	10 (50)	13 (55)	15 (59)	18 (64)	18 (64)	15 (59)	12 (54)	8 (46)	6 (43)	11 (51)
Daily mean °C (°F)	3 (37)	2.1 (35.8)	3.3 (37.9)	6.3 (43.3)	9.4 (48.9)	12 (54)	14.9 (58.8)	15.2 (59.4)	12.9 (55.2)	8.8 (47.8)	5.9 (42.6)	3.6 (38.5)	8.1 (46.6)
Mean daily minimum °C (°F)	1 (34)	0 (32)	1 (34)	4 (39)	7 (45)	10 (50)	13 (55)	13 (55)	11 (52)	7 (45)	4 (39)	2 (36)	6 (43)
Record low °C (°F)	−16.6 (2.1)	−13 (9)	−13.3 (8.1)	−5.9 (21.4)	−2.2 (28.0)	1.6 (34.9)	5.6 (42.1)	4.9 (40.8)	1.1 (34.0)	−3.4 (25.9)	−11.4 (11.5)	−14.9 (5.2)	−16.6 (2.1)
Average precipitation mm (inches)	160 (6.3)	133 (5.2)	123 (4.8)	86 (3.4)	76 (3.0)	85 (3.3)	97 (3.8)	143 (5.6)	172 (6.8)	197 (7.8)	199 (7.8)	192 (7.6)	1,663 (65.4)
Source 1: yr.no/met.no/eklima
Source 2: Weatheronline (avg highs/lows 1996–2020)

== Government ==
Karmøy Municipality is responsible for primary education (through 10th grade), outpatient health services, senior citizen services, welfare and other social services, zoning, economic development, and municipal roads and utilities. The municipality is governed by a municipal council of directly elected representatives. The mayor is indirectly elected by a vote of the municipal council. The municipality is under the jurisdiction of the Haugaland og Sunnhordland District Court and the Gulating Court of Appeal.

=== Municipal council ===
The municipal council (Kommunestyre) of Karmøy Municipality is made up of 45 representatives that are elected to four-year terms. The tables below show the current and historical composition of the council by political party.

Karmøy kommunestyre 2023–2027
Party name (in Norwegian)	Number of representatives
Labour Party (Arbeiderpartiet)	7
Progress Party (Fremskrittspartiet)	9
Green Party (Miljøpartiet De Grønne)	1
Conservative Party (Høyre)	6
Industry and Business Party (Industri‑ og Næringspartiet)	4
Christian Democratic Party (Kristelig Folkeparti)	5
Red Party (Rødt)	1
Centre Party (Senterpartiet)	2
Socialist Left Party (Sosialistisk Venstreparti)	2
Liberal Party (Venstre)	1
Karmøy List (Karmøylista)	7
Total number of members:	45

Karmøy kommunestyre 2019–2023
Party name (in Norwegian)	Number of representatives
Labour Party (Arbeiderpartiet)	10
Progress Party (Fremskrittspartiet)	6
Green Party (Miljøpartiet De Grønne)	2
Conservative Party (Høyre)	9
Christian Democratic Party (Kristelig Folkeparti)	5
Centre Party (Senterpartiet)	4
Socialist Left Party (Sosialistisk Venstreparti)	2
Liberal Party (Venstre)	1
Karmøy List (Karmøylista)	6
Total number of members:	45

Karmøy kommunestyre 2015–2019
Party name (in Norwegian)	Number of representatives
Labour Party (Arbeiderpartiet)	15
Progress Party (Fremskrittspartiet)	9
Green Party (Miljøpartiet De Grønne)	1
Conservative Party (Høyre)	8
The Christians Party (Partiet De Kristne)	1
Christian Democratic Party (Kristelig Folkeparti)	7
Centre Party (Senterpartiet)	2
Socialist Left Party (Sosialistisk Venstreparti)	1
Liberal Party (Venstre)	1
Total number of members:	45

Karmøy kommunestyre 2011–2015
Party name (in Norwegian)	Number of representatives
Labour Party (Arbeiderpartiet)	11
Progress Party (Fremskrittspartiet)	11
Conservative Party (Høyre)	12
Christian Democratic Party (Kristelig Folkeparti)	7
Pensioners' Party (Pensjonistpartiet)	1
Centre Party (Senterpartiet)	1
Socialist Left Party (Sosialistisk Venstreparti)	1
Liberal Party (Venstre)	1
Total number of members:	45

Karmøy kommunestyre 2007–2011
Party name (in Norwegian)	Number of representatives
Labour Party (Arbeiderpartiet)	10
Progress Party (Fremskrittspartiet)	16
Conservative Party (Høyre)	5
Christian Democratic Party (Kristelig Folkeparti)	10
Centre Party (Senterpartiet)	1
Socialist Left Party (Sosialistisk Venstreparti)	1
Liberal Party (Venstre)	2
Total number of members:	45

Karmøy kommunestyre 2003–2007
Party name (in Norwegian)	Number of representatives
Labour Party (Arbeiderpartiet)	8
Progress Party (Fremskrittspartiet)	15
Conservative Party (Høyre)	5
Christian Democratic Party (Kristelig Folkeparti)	11
Pensioners' Party (Pensjonistpartiet)	1
Centre Party (Senterpartiet)	1
Socialist Left Party (Sosialistisk Venstreparti)	3
Liberal Party (Venstre)	1
Total number of members:	45

Karmøy kommunestyre 1999–2003
Party name (in Norwegian)	Number of representatives
Labour Party (Arbeiderpartiet)	14
Progress Party (Fremskrittspartiet)	13
Conservative Party (Høyre)	8
Christian Democratic Party (Kristelig Folkeparti)	17
Pensioners' Party (Pensjonistpartiet)	1
Centre Party (Senterpartiet)	2
Socialist Left Party (Sosialistisk Venstreparti)	3
Liberal Party (Venstre)	3
Total number of members:	61

Karmøy kommunestyre 1995–1999
Party name (in Norwegian)	Number of representatives
Labour Party (Arbeiderpartiet)	17
Progress Party (Fremskrittspartiet)	10
Conservative Party (Høyre)	7
Christian Democratic Party (Kristelig Folkeparti)	16
Pensioners' Party (Pensjonistpartiet)	1
Centre Party (Senterpartiet)	4
Socialist Left Party (Sosialistisk Venstreparti)	2
Liberal Party (Venstre)	4
Total number of members:	61

Karmøy kommunestyre 1991–1995
Party name (in Norwegian)	Number of representatives
Labour Party (Arbeiderpartiet)	13
Progress Party (Fremskrittspartiet)	5
Conservative Party (Høyre)	8
Christian Democratic Party (Kristelig Folkeparti)	15
Pensioners' Party (Pensjonistpartiet)	6
Centre Party (Senterpartiet)	5
Socialist Left Party (Sosialistisk Venstreparti)	3
Liberal Party (Venstre)	3
Fatherland Party (Fedrelandspartiet)	1
Cross-party alternative (Tverrpolitisk alternativ)	2
Total number of members:	61

Karmøy kommunestyre 1987–1991
Party name (in Norwegian)	Number of representatives
Labour Party (Arbeiderpartiet)	16
Progress Party (Fremskrittspartiet)	10
Conservative Party (Høyre)	12
Christian Democratic Party (Kristelig Folkeparti)	14
Centre Party (Senterpartiet)	2
Socialist Left Party (Sosialistisk Venstreparti)	1
Liberal Party (Venstre)	6
Total number of members:	61

Karmøy kommunestyre 1983–1987
Party name (in Norwegian)	Number of representatives
Labour Party (Arbeiderpartiet)	17
Progress Party (Fremskrittspartiet)	7
Conservative Party (Høyre)	15
Christian Democratic Party (Kristelig Folkeparti)	15
Centre Party (Senterpartiet)	2
Socialist Left Party (Sosialistisk Venstreparti)	1
Liberal Party (Venstre)	4
Total number of members:	61

Karmøy kommunestyre 1979–1983
Party name (in Norwegian)	Number of representatives
Labour Party (Arbeiderpartiet)	15
Progress Party (Fremskrittspartiet)	4
Conservative Party (Høyre)	19
Christian Democratic Party (Kristelig Folkeparti)	16
Centre Party (Senterpartiet)	3
Socialist Left Party (Sosialistisk Venstreparti)	1
Liberal Party (Venstre)	3
Total number of members:	61

Karmøy kommunestyre 1975–1979
Party name (in Norwegian)	Number of representatives
Labour Party (Arbeiderpartiet)	16
Anders Lange's Party (Anders Langes parti)	3
Conservative Party (Høyre)	9
Christian Democratic Party (Kristelig Folkeparti)	21
New People's Party (Nye Folkepartiet)	2
Centre Party (Senterpartiet)	5
Socialist Left Party (Sosialistisk Venstreparti)	2
Liberal Party (Venstre)	3
Total number of members:	61

Karmøy kommunestyre 1971–1975
Party name (in Norwegian)	Number of representatives
Labour Party (Arbeiderpartiet)	17
Conservative Party (Høyre)	7
Christian Democratic Party (Kristelig Folkeparti)	14
Centre Party (Senterpartiet)	6
Socialist People's Party (Sosialistisk Folkeparti)	1
Liberal Party (Venstre)	7
Local List(s) (Lokale lister)	9
Total number of members:	61

Karmøy kommunestyre 1967–1971
Party name (in Norwegian)	Number of representatives
Labour Party (Arbeiderpartiet)	20
Conservative Party (Høyre)	6
Christian Democratic Party (Kristelig Folkeparti)	9
Centre Party (Senterpartiet)	5
Socialist People's Party (Sosialistisk Folkeparti)	1
Liberal Party (Venstre)	11
Local List(s) (Lokale lister)	9
Total number of members:	61

=== Mayors ===
The mayor (Bokmål: ordfører) of Karmøy Municipality is the political leader of the municipality and the chairperson of the municipal council. The following people have held this position:

- 1965–1968: Thomas Stange (V)
- 1969–1969: Bjarne Espeseth (KrF)
- 1970–1971: Kaare Wegner Stange (Sp)
- 1972–1973: Jakob Eng (KrF)
- 1974–1975: Kaare Wegner Stange (Sp)
- 1976–1981: Jakob Eng (KrF)
- 1982–1982: Godtfred Kristensen (H)
- 1983–1984: Jakob Eng (KrF)
- 1985–1989: Hans Sund (H)
- 1990–1991: Jostein Espeset (KrF)
- 1992–1993: Gunnar Mosbron (Ap)
- 1994–1995: Leif Malvin Knutsen (KrF)
- 1996–2011: Kjell Arvid Svendsen (KrF)
- 2011–2015: Aase Simonsen (H)
- 2015–2023: Jarle Nilsen (Ap)
- 2023–present: Leiv Arne Marhaug (H)

== Industry ==
Norsk Hydro is a large aluminium smelter operator located on the island of Karmøy. The power supply of this facility is done by three overhead power lines, which cross the Karmsundet strait on 143.5-metre (471 ft) tall pylons. These pylons are the tallest electricity pylons in Norway.

Bauer-Nilsen design and produce high-pressure hydraulics located at Karmøy.

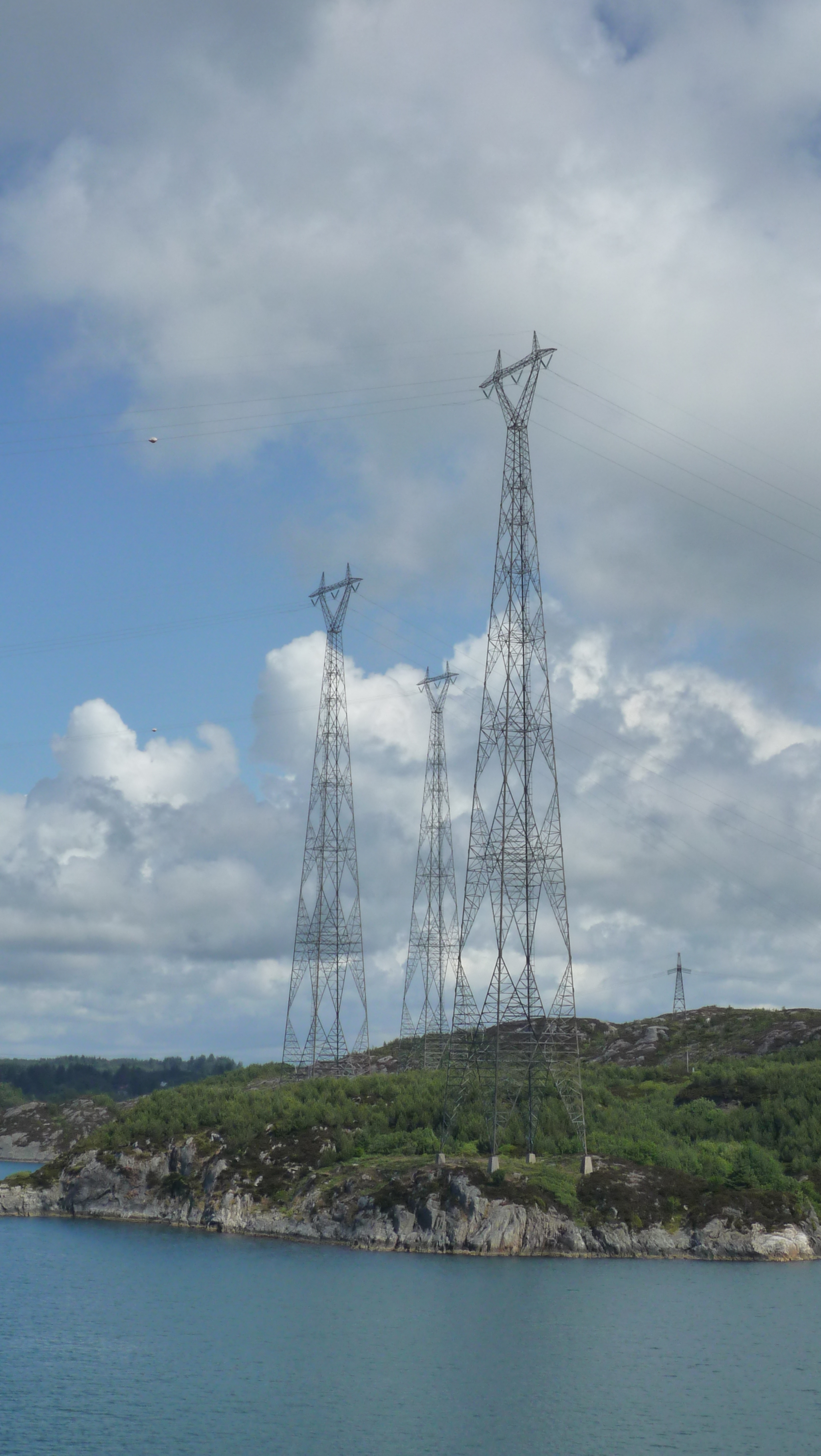
Powerlines crossing Karmsund

== Area attractions ==
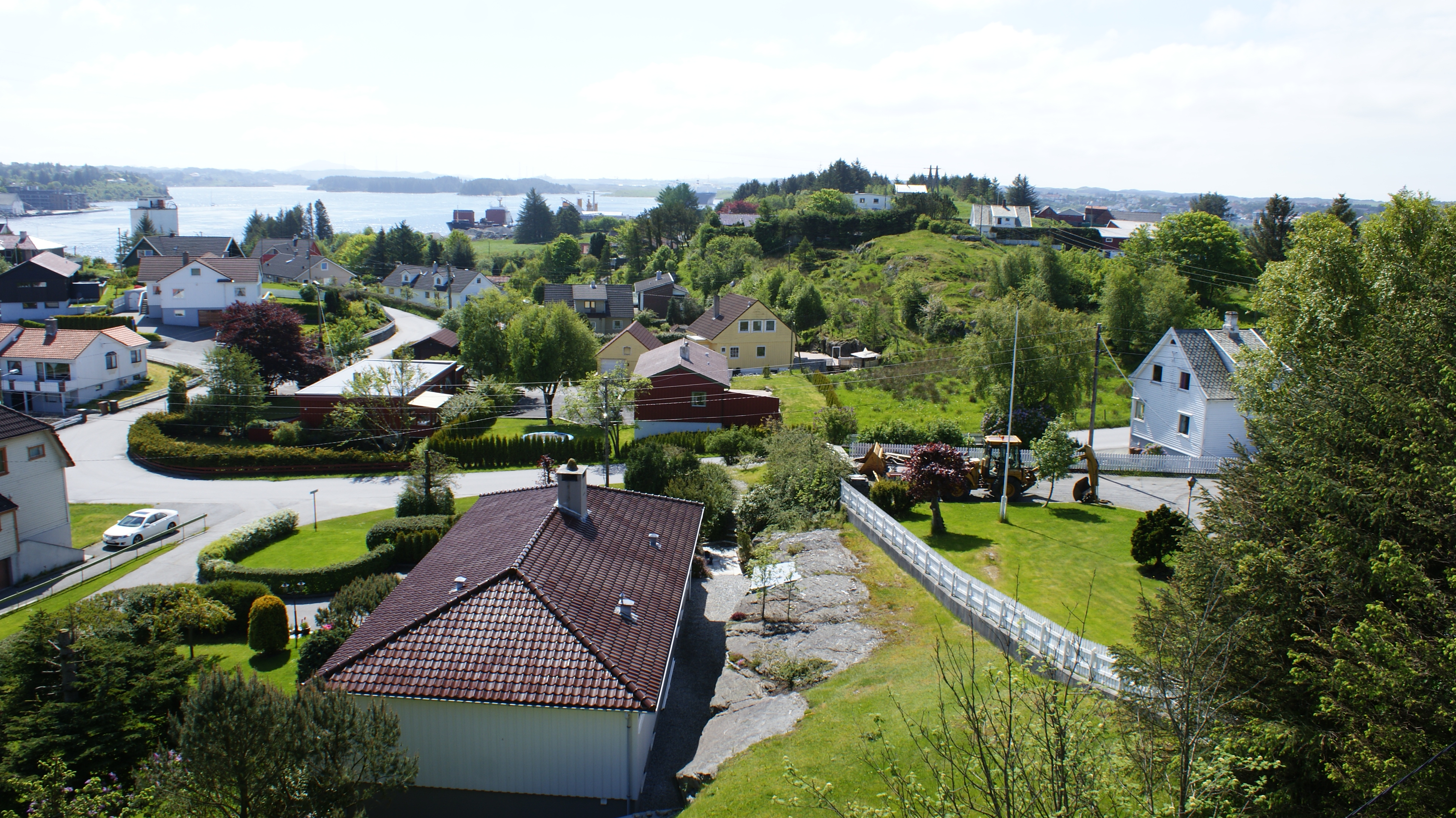
Salhus village

- Skude Festival (Skudefestivalen) is an annual festival held during the first week of July in Skudeneshavn. It is the largest gathering of coastal culture in Western Norway with boats of all categories: vintage boats of all categories – old wooden boats, vintage boats, modern boats, sailing boats, tall ships. Craftsmen demonstrate handcrafts from olden days connected to sea and shipping. International and national artists entertain in the evenings. In 2004, Skudeneshavn was voted Norway's summer city by national TV viewers.
- Viking Farm (Vikinggarden) is part of the Nordvegen History Centre, located close to Avaldsnes. The building and use of the farm is an ongoing experimental archaeological research and interpretation programme. The farm includes reconstructed houses.
- Karmøy Museum of Fishing (Karmøy Fiskerimuseum), which opened in 1999 in Veavågen, presents the history of fishing in the region of Karmøy from the 1950s up to the present day. In addition to the main exhibitions there are salt-water aquariums showing the most common types of fish in the area. The Karmøy Fishery Museum is housed in a new building with unique architecture.
- Mælandsgården Museum (Museet i Mælandsgården) is situated in the middle of the old, well preserved part of Skudeneshavn. A town model shows what old Skudeneshavn looked like in 1918.
- Rogaland Fish Museum (Rogaland Fiskerimuseum), located in an old herring salting factory in Åkrehamn, is fully restored to its former glory and housing new exhibitions about the history of this vibrant coastal community. This museum also richly depicts the contact enjoyed between Karmøy and North America.
- Visnes Mining Museum (Visnes Gruvemuseum) provides the history of the rather special mining community that in the 1800s had 3,000 inhabitants. Visnes supplied the copper for the Statue of Liberty in New York City.
- Ferkingstad, an area known for its archaeological finds, from the early Viking period to the late medieval era.

== International relations ==
=== Twin towns – Sister cities ===
Karmøy has sister city agreements with the following places:

- Mjölby, Sweden
- Vinderup, Denmark
- Hankasalmi, Finland

== Notable people ==
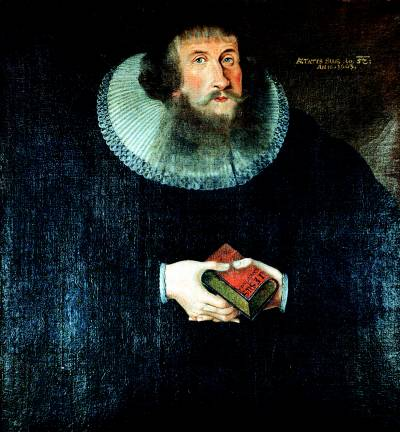
Christen Schaaning, 1663

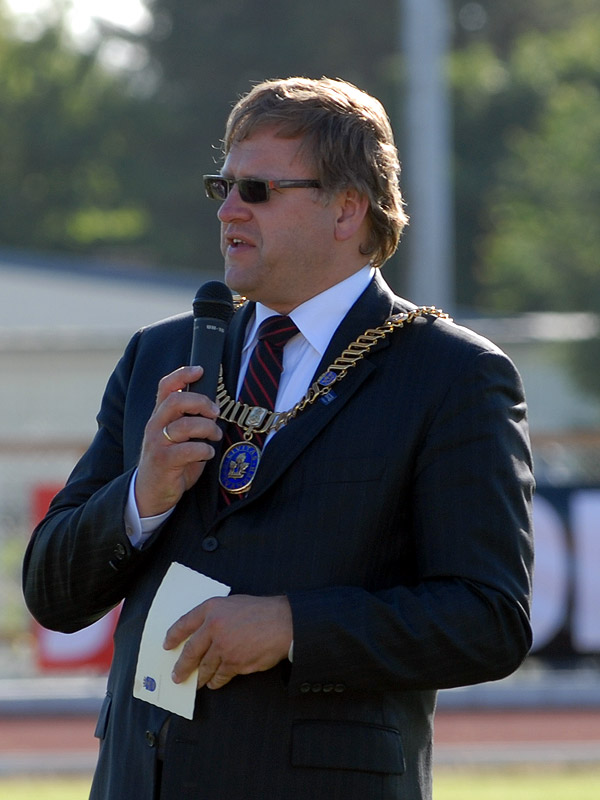
Leif Johan Sevland, 2007

- King Augvald (7th century AD), the semi-legendary king in Norway
- King Ferking (7th century AD), the semi-legendary king in Norway
- King Harald Fairhair (c. 850—c. 932), the first king of a united Norway
- Christen Bentsen Schaaning (ca.1611–1679), a clergyman and parish priest of Avaldsnes from 1635–1679
- Thormodus Torfæus (1636—1719), an Icelandic-born resident of Kopervik, the first Royal Historian of Norway
- Gina Krog (1847—1916), a suffragist, politician and major figure in liberal feminism in Scandinavia
- Endre Johannes Cleven (1874—1916), a promoter of the settlement and culture of Norwegian immigrants in Manitoba
- Asbjørn Sunde (1909—1985), a communist resistance fighter and leader of the Osvald Group
- Jan Ivar Pedersen (born 1936), a professor of nutrition
- Jakob Eng (born 1937) a banker, politician, and Mayor of Karmøy in 1980s
- Thorhild Widvey (born 1956), a physical therapist, politician, and government minister
- Leif Johan Sevland (born 1961), a politician who was mayor of Stavanger from 1995 to 2011
- Leif Ove Andsnes (born 1970), a pianist and chamber musician
- Jostein Grindhaug (born 1973), a former football player with 135 caps for FK Haugesund and coach
- Anne Margrethe Hausken (born 1976), an orienteering world champion who grew up in Karmøy
- Bjørn Eriksen, (Norwegian Wiki) (born 1983), a videogame commentator («Addexio») on YouTube
- Jesper Pedersen (alpine skier) (born 1999), a Gold medalist at the Winter Paralympics
