= Karmøy (island) =

Island in Rogaland, Norway

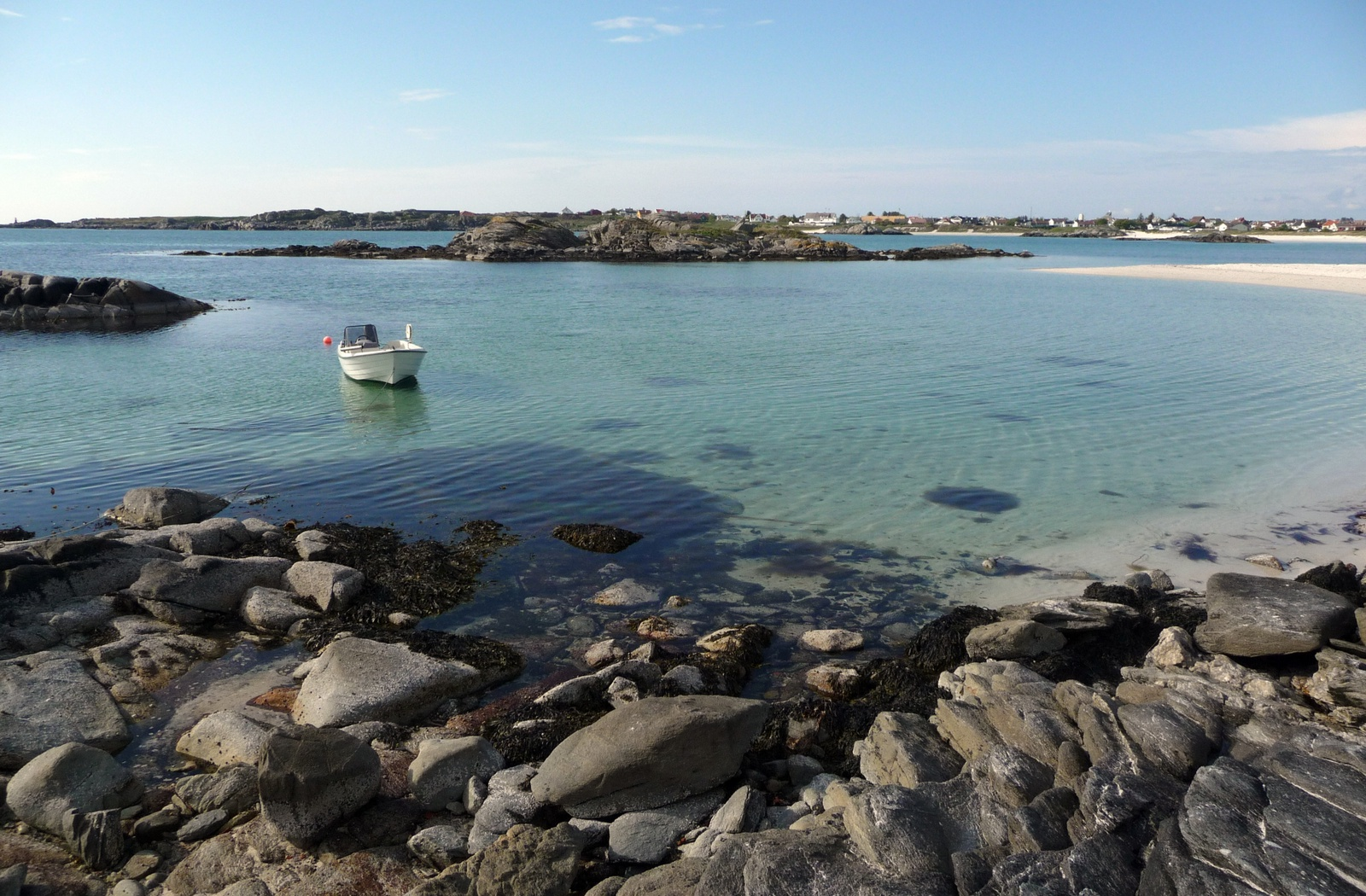
- Åkrasanden, west on Karmøy
- Interactive map of the island

Geography
- Location: Rogaland, Norway
- Coordinates: 59.39385°N 5.25323°E
- Area: 176.8 km^{2} (68.3 sq mi)
- Length: 30 km (19 mi)
- Width: 9 km (5.6 mi)
- Highest elevation: 132 m (433 ft)
- Highest point: Søre Sålefjell

Administration
- Norway
- County: Rogaland
- Municipality: Karmøy Municipality

Demographics
- Population: 34,100 (2025)
- Pop. density: 192.9/km^{2} (499.6/sq mi)

Karmøy is an island in Karmøy Municipality in the northwestern part of Rogaland county, Norway. The island covers an area of 176.8 square kilometres (68.3 sq mi) and measures approximately 30 kilometres (19 mi) long, and up to 9 kilometres (5.6 mi) wide. Karmøy is the largest island in Rogaland county, the most populous island in South Norway, and the second most populous island in Norway.

The island is separated from the mainland by the Karmsundet strait, with the Boknafjorden located to the south and southeast, while the Sirafjorden to the west separates the island of Karmøy from the islands of Utsira and Feøy. The island of Karmøy constitutes the main part of Karmøy Municipality, together with several smaller surrounding islands and a portion of the mainland east of Haugesund Municipality.

== Settlements and towns ==
Karmøy had about 34,100 inhabitants in 2025. The island is the most populous in South Norway and, after Tromsøya, the most populous island in Norway. The population has grown significantly since the 1960s. Karmøy is the only island in Norway with three towns: Kopervik (the municipal center), Skudeneshavn, and Åkrehamn. Avaldsnes, Norway’s oldest royal seat, with roots dating back to the Viking Age, is also located on the island.

=== Transport and infrastructure ===
Karmøy is connected to the mainland by the Karmsund Bridge in the north and by the Karmøy Tunnel further south. The latter runs beneath the Karmsundet strait and the Førresfjorden, and was opened in 2013 as part of the T-Link project. The tunnel provides the island with an eastern link to European route E39 in Tysvær and also includes a branch northward to the mainland part of Karmøy Municipality outside Haugesund.

The main north–south route on the island is County Road 547. The road runs along the western side of the island, from Skudeneshavn in the south to Åkrehamn, before crossing to the east coast at Kopervik and then continuing north to connect with European route E134 at Våge. Haugesund Airport is located at Helganes on the island’s west coast, at the western terminus of E134.

== Name ==
The name Karmøy derives from the Old Norse word Kǫrmt which is the genitive form of Karmtar, which is likely derived from karmr, meaning "that which forms a frame", in the sense of a barrier or protection against the sea.

== See also ==
- List of islands of Norway
