= Åkra Municipality =

Former municipality in Rogaland, Norway

Åkra Municipality Åkra herred
- Former municipality
- Aakra herred (historic name); Aakre herred (historic name)
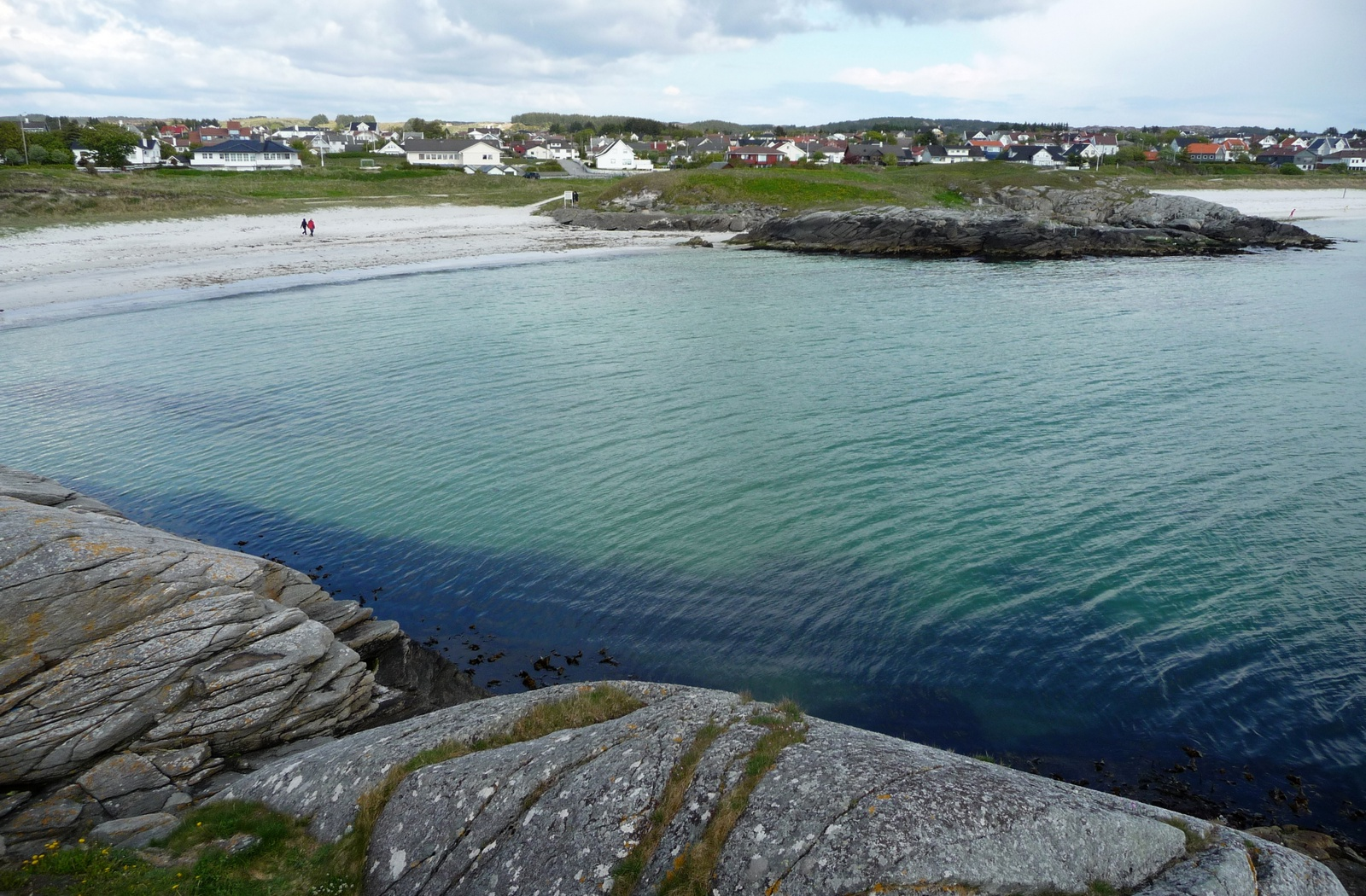
- View of the Åkra coastline

- Rogaland within Norway

- Åkra within Rogaland
- Coordinates: 59°15′30″N 05°10′55″E
- Country: Norway
- County: Rogaland
- District: Haugaland
- Established: 1 Jan 1892
  - Preceded by: Skudenes Municipality
- Disestablished: 1 Jan 1965
  - Succeeded by: Karmøy Municipality
- Administrative centre: Åkrehamn

Government
  - Mayor (1963–1964): Torgils Grindhaug (LL)

Area (upon dissolution)
  - Total: 33.4 km^{2} (12.9 sq mi)
  - Rank: #483 in Norway
- Highest elevation: 97 m (318 ft)

Population (1964)
  - Total: 5,824
  - Rank: #161 in Norway
  - Density: 174.4/km^{2} (452/sq mi)
  - Change (10 years): ▲ +9.8%
- Demonym: Åkrabu

Official language
  - Norwegian form: Neutral
- Time zone: UTC+01:00 (CET)
  - Summer (DST): UTC+02:00 (CEST)
- ISO 3166 code: NO-1149

Åkra is a former municipality in Rogaland county, Norway. The 33.4-square-kilometre (12.9 sq mi) municipality existed from 1892 until its dissolution in 1965. The area is now part of Karmøy Municipality in the traditional district of Haugaland. The administrative centre was the village of Åkrehamn. Other villages in the municipality included Veavågen and Sævelandsvik.

Prior to its dissolution in 1965, the 33.4-square-kilometre (12.9 sq mi) municipality was the 483rd largest by area out of the 525 municipalities in Norway. Åkra Municipality was the 161st most populous municipality in Norway with a population of about 5,824. The municipality's population density was 174.4 inhabitants per square kilometre (452/sq mi) and its population had increased by 9.8% over the previous 10-year period.

== General information ==
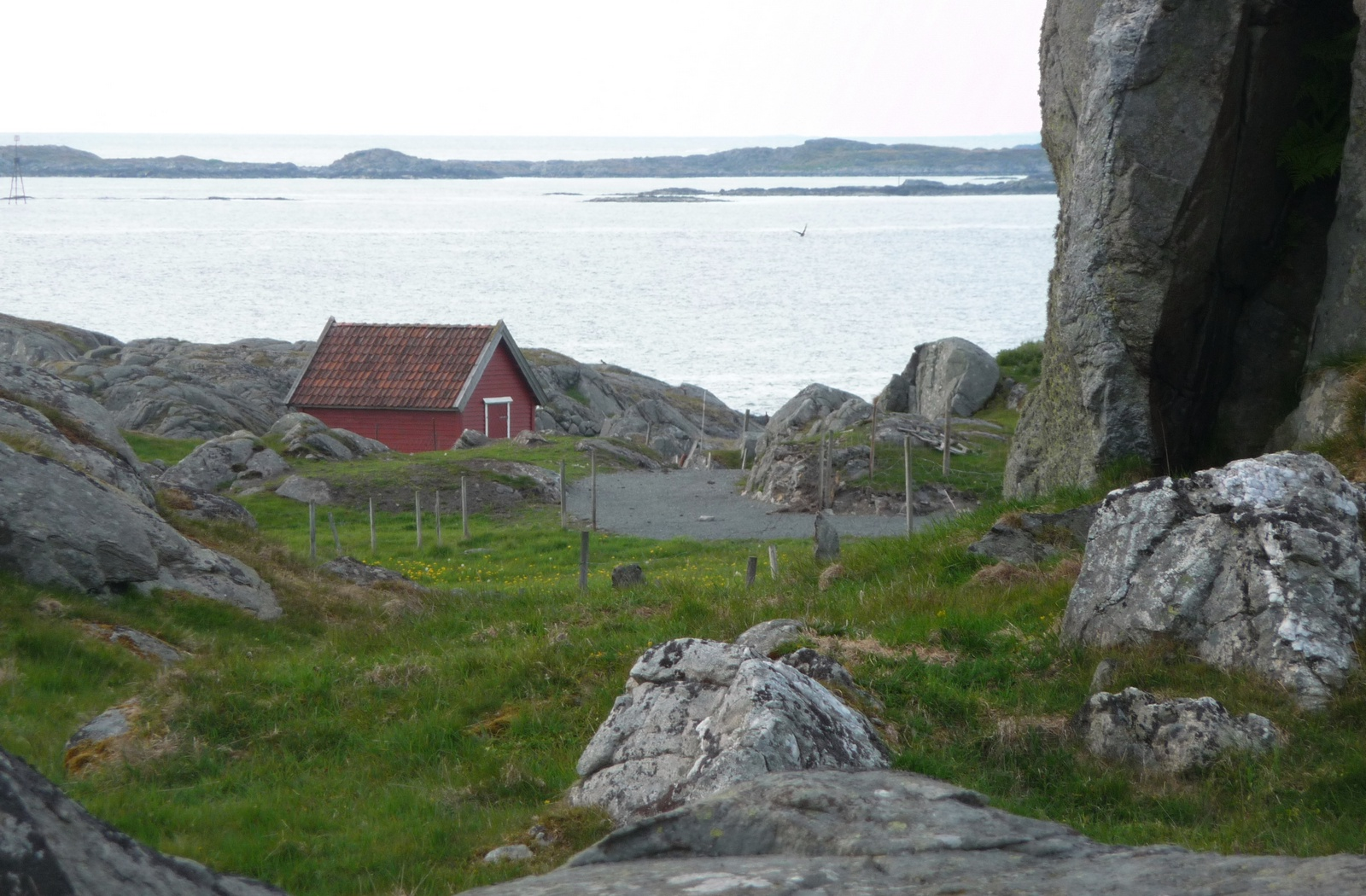
View of the Åkra coastline

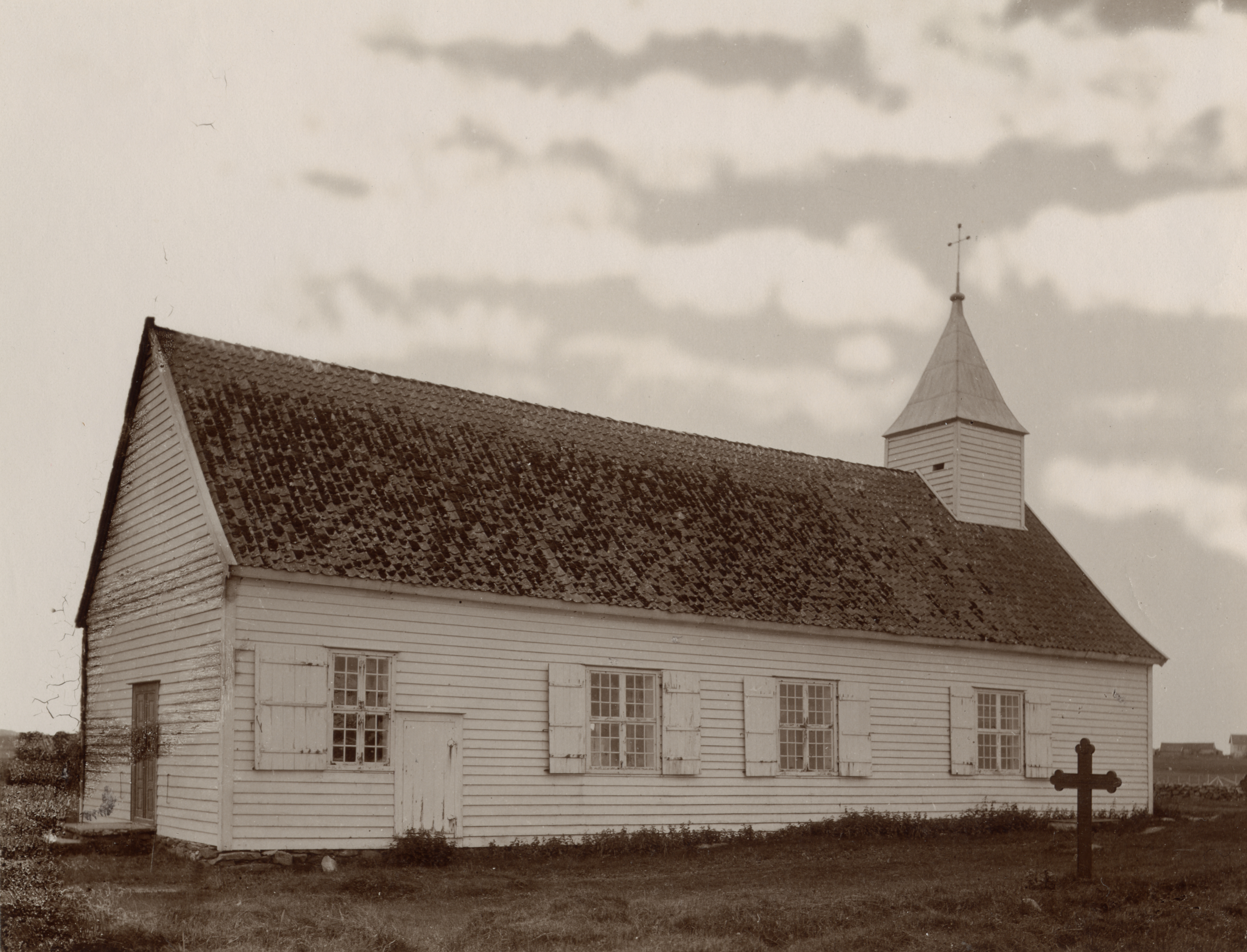
View of the Old Åkra Church

The municipality of Aakre (later spelled Åkra) was established on 1 January 1892 when Skudenes Municipality was divided into two: the northern part (population: 1,962) became the new Aakre Municipality and the southern part (population: 2,732) remained as a smaller Skudenes Municipality.

On 1 January 1965, Åkra Municipality (population: 6,008) was dissolved upon recommendations of the Schei Committee and its lands were merged with the following areas to form the new Karmøy Municipality:

- all of the town of Kopervik (population: 1,737)
- all of the town of Skudeneshavn (population: 1,275)
- all of the Skudenes Municipality (population: 3,583)
- all of the Stangaland Municipality (population: 2,678)
- most of Avaldsnes Municipality (population: 4,153), except for the Gismarvik, Førre, and Stegaberg areas that became part of Tysvær Municipality
- most of Torvastad Municipality (population: 3,783), except for the island of Vibrandsøy (population: 70) which became part of Haugesund Municipality

=== Name ===
The municipality (originally the parish) is named after the old Aakre farm (Old Norse: Akrar) since the first Åkra Church was built there. The name comes from the plural form of akr which means "field" or "acre".

Historically, the name of the municipality was spelled Aakre. On 3 November 1917, a royal resolution changed the spelling of the name of the municipality to Aakra. On 21 December 1917, a royal resolution enacted the 1917 Norwegian language reforms. Prior to this change, the name was spelled Aakra with the digraph "Aa", and after this reform, the name was spelled Åkra, using the letter Å instead.

=== Churches ===
The Church of Norway had one parish (sokn) within Åkra Municipality. At the time of the municipal dissolution, it was part of the Kopervik prestegjeld and the Karmsund prosti (deanery) in the Diocese of Stavanger.

Churches in Åkra Municipality
Parish (sokn)	Church name	Location of the church	Year built
Åkra	Åkra Church	Åkrehamn	1985
Åkra	Old Åkra Church	Åkrehamn	1821

== Geography ==
Åkra Municipality included the western central portions of the island of Karmøy. The highest point in the municipality was the 97-metre (318 ft) tall mountain Rossafjellet. Stangaland Municipality was located to the north and east, Skudenes Municipality was located to the south, and Utsira Municipality was located to the west.

== Government ==
While it existed, Åkra Municipality was responsible for primary education (through 10th grade), outpatient health services, senior citizen services, welfare and other social services, zoning, economic development, and municipal roads and utilities. The municipality was governed by a municipal council of directly elected representatives. The mayor was indirectly elected by a vote of the municipal council. The municipality was under the jurisdiction of the Karmsund District Court and the Gulating Court of Appeal.

=== Municipal council ===
The municipal council (Herredsstyre) of Åkra Municipality was made up of 25 representatives that were elected to four year terms. The tables below show the historical composition of the council by political party.

Åkra herredsstyre 1963–1965
Party name (in Norwegian)	Number of representatives
Local List(s) (Lokale lister)	25
Total number of members:	25
Note: On 1 January 1965, Åkra Municipality became part of Karmøy Municipality.

Åkra herredsstyre 1959–1963
Party name (in Norwegian)	Number of representatives
Labour Party (Arbeiderpartiet)	8
Local List(s) (Lokale lister)	17
Total number of members:	25

Åkra herredsstyre 1955–1959
Party name (in Norwegian)	Number of representatives
Labour Party (Arbeiderpartiet)	4
Local List(s) (Lokale lister)	21
Total number of members:	25

Åkra herredsstyre 1951–1955
Party name (in Norwegian)	Number of representatives
Labour Party (Arbeiderpartiet)	6
Local List(s) (Lokale lister)	10
Total number of members:	16

Åkra herredsstyre 1947–1951
Party name (in Norwegian)	Number of representatives
Labour Party (Arbeiderpartiet)	6
Joint List(s) of Non-Socialist Parties (Borgerlige Felleslister)	8
Local List(s) (Lokale lister)	2
Total number of members:	16

Åkra herredsstyre 1945–1947
Party name (in Norwegian)	Number of representatives
Labour Party (Arbeiderpartiet)	6
Local List(s) (Lokale lister)	10
Total number of members:	16

Åkra herredsstyre 1937–1941*
Party name (in Norwegian)	Number of representatives
Labour Party (Arbeiderpartiet)	6
Joint List(s) of Non-Socialist Parties (Borgerlige Felleslister)	9
Local List(s) (Lokale lister)	1
Total number of members:	16
Note: Due to the German occupation of Norway during World War II, no elections were held for new municipal councils until after the war ended in 1945.

=== Mayors ===
The mayor (Norwegian: ordfører) of Åkra Municipality was the political leader of the municipality and the chairperson of the municipal council. The following people have held this position:

- 1892–1897: Jakob E. Midhaug
- 1898–1907: Peder O. Vea
- 1908–1910: Didrik S. Vea
- 1911–1913: Rasmus S. Tjøsvold
- 1914–1916: Bendik Mannæs
- 1917–1917: Edvard Svendsen Vea
- 1918–1919: Bendik Mannæs
- 1920–1925: Edvard Svendsen Vea
- 1926–1931: Govert Grindhaug
- 1932–1934: Lars K. Munkejord
- 1935–1937: Henrik Ringdal
- 1938–1941: Lars Tvedt
- 1942–1942: Olav Åsen
- 1943–1943: Ivar Kvale
- 1944–1945: Helmer Grindheim
- 1945–1945: Lars Tvedt (H)
- 1945–1947: Einar Andreassen (Ap)
- 1947–1951: Henrik Ringdal
- 1951–1955: Einar Andreassen (Ap)
- 1955–1959: Torgils Grindhaug (LL)
- 1959–1961: Einar Andreassen (Ap)
- 1961–1963: Søren Vermundsen
- 1963–1964: Torgils Grindhaug (LL)

== Attractions ==
The Old Åkra Church (Åkra gamle kyrkje) dates back to 1821. It was built of wood and has 320 seats. The church was restored in 1852 and 1899. Rogaland Fishery Museum (Rogaland Fiskerimuseum) is situated on the harbor in Åkrehamn. It contains a restored herring works with a collection of artifacts and equipment associated with the local fishing and shipping industries.

== Notable people ==
- Jostein Grindhaug, a football manager

== See also ==
- List of former municipalities of Norway
