= Veavågen =

Village in Karmøy Municipality, Norway

Veavågen Vedavågen (historic)
- Village
- Interactive map of Veavågen
- Coordinates: 59.29483°N 5.21874°E
- Country: Norway
- Region: Western Norway
- County: Rogaland
- District: Haugaland
- Municipality: Karmøy Municipality

Area
  - Total: 2.48 km^{2} (0.96 sq mi)
- Elevation: 25 m (82 ft)

Population (2014)
  - Total: 2,968
  - Density: 1,197/km^{2} (3,100/sq mi)
- Time zone: UTC+01:00 (CET)
  - Summer (DST): UTC+02:00 (CEST)
- Post Code: 4276 Veavågen

Veavågen (historically Vedavågen) is an urban village in Karmøy Municipality in Rogaland county, Norway. It is located on the western shore of the island of Karmøy, about halfway between the towns of Kopervik and Åkrehamn. The Norwegian county road 854 runs through the east side of the village.

The economy of Veavågen is centered around fishing and related industries. The local sports club is named SK Vedavåg Karmøy. Vedavågen Church was built here in 2009 in a long church style. Storhall Karmøy, one of the biggest athlete halls in the district was built here in 2014-2015.

The 2.48-square-kilometre (610-acre) village has a population (2014) of 2,968; giving it a population density of 1,197 inhabitants per square kilometre (3,100/sq mi). Since 2015, the population of the urban area of Veavågen has been included within the town of Åkrehamn and separate statistics are no longer tracked by Statistics Norway. Prior to that time it was a tettsted which is an urban area in Norway, although it has never been granted town status under Norwegian law.

== Name ==
The name "Veavågen" is commonly shortened to "Vea". The name originates from one of the historical farms in the area, called "Vea" and vågen is the definite form of the Norwegian word for "bay", thus the bay of the farm Vea.

For several years, road signage and the postal service used the spelling "Vedavågen" and some of the locals used the spelling "Veavågen". On 25 November 2013, the municipal council of Karmøy Municipality declared that "Veavågen" was the proper spelling. The mailing areas associated with the village were changed to "Veavågen" effective 1 October 2014.
