= Old Åkra Church =

Church in Rogaland, Norway

- Åkra gamle kirke
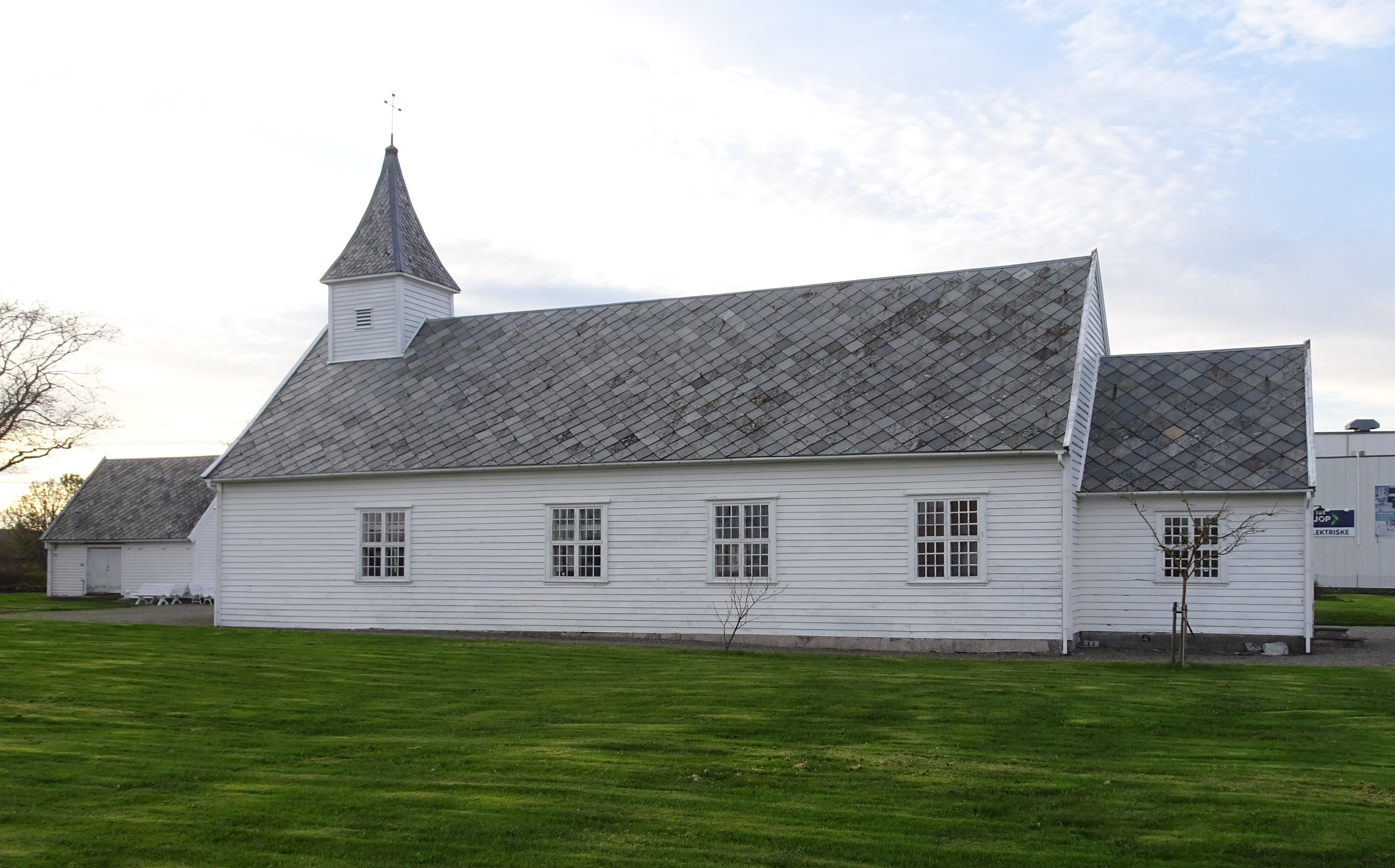
- View of the church
- Old Åkra Church
- 59.257475°N 5.191982°E
- Location: Karmøy Municipality, Rogaland
- Country: Norway
- Denomination: Church of Norway
- Churchmanship: Evangelical Lutheran

History
- Former name: Aakra kirke
- Status: Parish church
- Founded: 13th century
- Consecrated: 29 July 1821

Architecture
- Functional status: Active
- Architectural type: Long church
- Completed: 1820

Specifications
- Capacity: 320
- Materials: Wood

Administration
- Diocese: Stavanger bispedømme
- Deanery: Karmøy prosti
- Parish: Åkra
- Norwegian Cultural Heritage Site
- Type: Church
- Status: Automatically protected
- ID: 85953

Old Åkra Church (Norwegian: Åkra gamle kirke) is a historic parish church of the Church of Norway in Karmøy Municipality in Rogaland county, Norway. It is located in the town of Åkrehamn located on the western coast of the island of Karmøy. It formerly was the main church for the Åkra parish which is part of the Karmøy prosti (deanery) in the Diocese of Stavanger. The white, wooden church was built in a long church design in 1820 using designs by an unknown architect. The church seats about 320 people.

== History ==
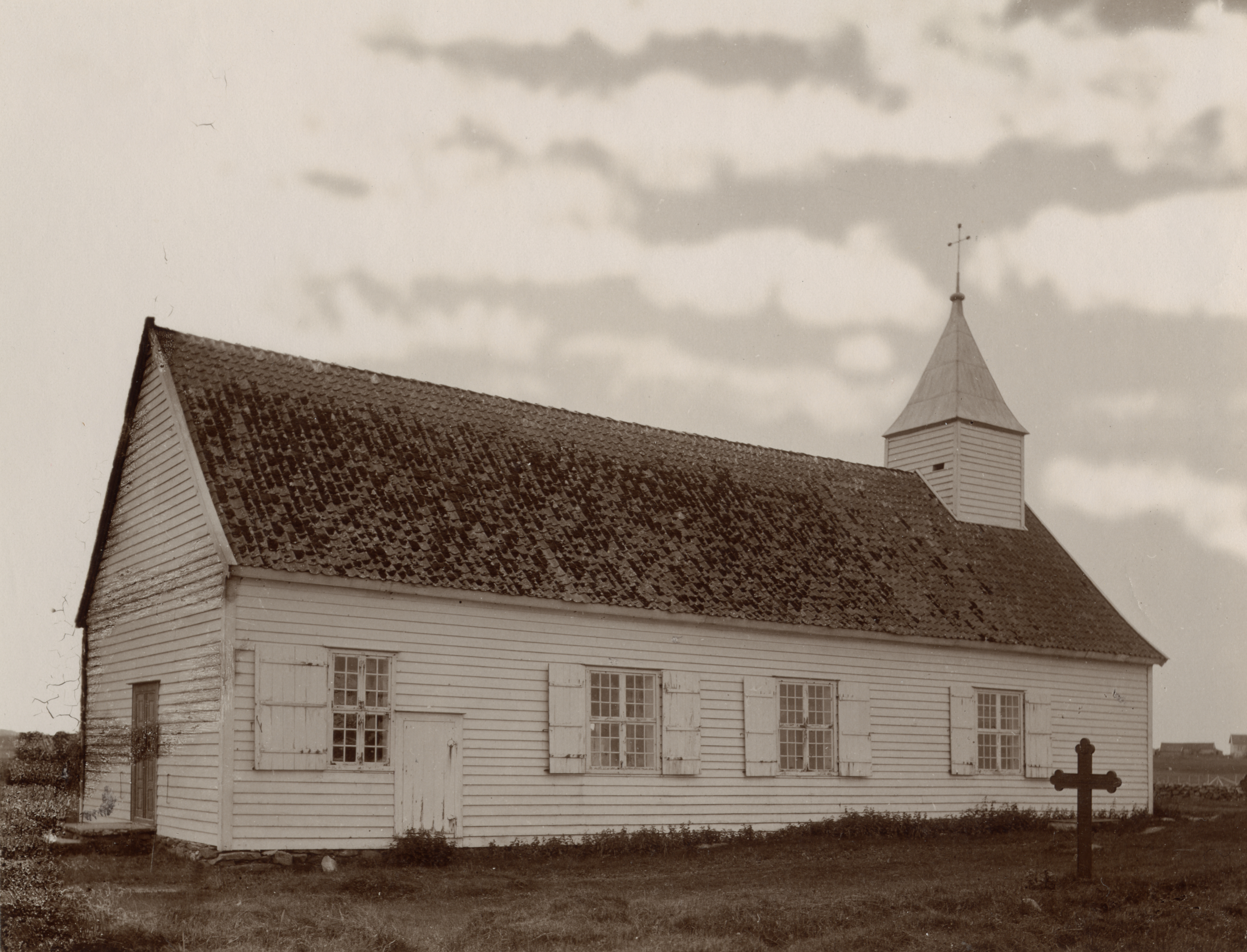
View of the church before the sacristy was added in 1899.

The earliest existing historical records of the church date back to the year 1301, but the church was likely built during the 12th century. Around 1600, the old medieval stave church was heavily renovated and rebuilt. In 1674, the church was described as being dilapidated, so major repairs were again carried out.

In June 1820, the old church was torn down and a new building was constructed on the same site. On 5 November 1820, the church held its first worship service, just five months after the old one was demolished. It was formally consecrated on 29 July 1821. In 1852, the nave was extended to the west. In 1899, a sacristy was built on the east end.

Shortly after the turn of the century, there was talk of building a new church on Åkra, but instead of new construction, the old church was restored both in the 1930s and again during the 1950s. The most recent restoration was made in 1970 when the church was stiffened with steel construction, made by Skudenes Stålindustri.

In 1985, a new Åkra Church was built about 200 metres (660 ft) to the southeast (on the other side of the road). After the new church was completed, the old church was taken out of regular use and has been used mostly for special occasions since that time.

== See also ==
- List of churches in Rogaland
