= Åkra Church =

Church in Rogaland, Norway

- Åkra kirke
- Åkra Church
- 59.257006°N 5.19555°E
- Location: Karmøy Municipality, Rogaland
- Country: Norway
- Denomination: Church of Norway
- Churchmanship: Evangelical Lutheran

History
- Status: Parish church
- Founded: 1985
- Consecrated: 10 Nov 1985

Architecture
- Functional status: Active
- Architect: Børge Brandsberg-Dahl
- Architectural type: Rectangular
- Completed: 1985

Specifications
- Capacity: 430
- Materials: Brick

Administration
- Diocese: Stavanger bispedømme
- Deanery: Karmøy prosti
- Parish: Åkra

Åkra Church (Norwegian: Åkra kirke) is a parish church of the Church of Norway in Karmøy Municipality in Rogaland county, Norway. It is located in the town of Åkrehamn on the western coast of the island of Karmøy. It is the main church for the Åkra parish which is part of the Karmøy prosti (deanery) in the Diocese of Stavanger. The modern-looking, white, brick church was built in a rectangular design in 1985 using designs by the architect Børge Brandsberg-Dahl.

The church was built in 1985 to replace the small, aging Old Åkra Church which is located about 200 metres (660 ft) to the northwest (on the other side of the road). The church was consecrated on 10 November 1985 by the Bishop Sigurd Lunde. The 1,600 square metres (17,000 sq ft) church seats about 430 people in the main sanctuary, but it can be expanded to more if needed.

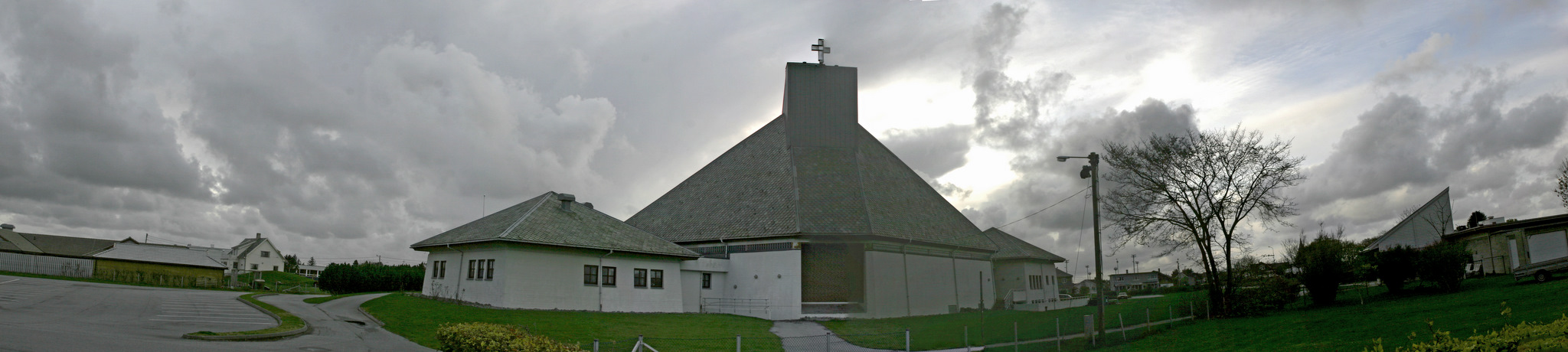

== See also ==
- List of churches in Rogaland
