= Stangaland Municipality =

Former municipality in Rogaland, Norway

Stangaland Municipality Stangaland herred
- Former municipality
- Kopervik herred (historic name)
- Rogaland within Norway

- Stangaland within Rogaland
- Coordinates: 59°16′31″N 05°18′19″E
- Country: Norway
- County: Rogaland
- District: Haugaland
- Established: 1 Jan 1909
  - Preceded by: Avaldsnes Municipality
- Disestablished: 1 Jan 1965
  - Succeeded by: Karmøy Municipality
- Administrative centre: Stangaland

Government
  - Mayor (1959–1965): Anker Økland (H)

Area (upon dissolution)
  - Total: 28.5 km^{2} (11.0 sq mi)
  - Rank: #487 in Norway
- Highest elevation: 132 m (433 ft)

Population (1964)
  - Total: 2,604
  - Rank: #334 in Norway
  - Density: 91.4/km^{2} (237/sq mi)
  - Change (10 years): ▲ +21.6%
- Demonym: Stangalandsbu

Official language
  - Norwegian form: Neutral
- Time zone: UTC+01:00 (CET)
  - Summer (DST): UTC+02:00 (CEST)
- ISO 3166 code: NO-1148

Stangaland (also spelled Stangeland) is a former municipality in Rogaland county, Norway. The 28.5-square-kilometre (11.0 sq mi) municipality existed from 1909 until its dissolution in 1965. The area is now part of Karmøy Municipality in the traditional district of Haugaland. The administrative centre was the village of Stangaland just outside the town of Kopervik (the town of Kopervik was a separate municipality).

Prior to its dissolution in 1965, the 28.5-square-kilometre (11.0 sq mi) municipality was the 487th largest by area out of the 525 municipalities in Norway. Stangaland Municipality was the 334th most populous municipality in Norway with a population of about 2,604. The municipality's population density was 91.4 inhabitants per square kilometre (237/sq mi) and its population had increased by 21.6% over the previous 10-year period.

== General information ==
The municipality was established on 1 January 1909 when the large Avaldsnes Municipality was divided. The southern part of the municipality on the island of Karmøy (population: 1,001) became the new Kopervik Municipality (Kopervik herred) and the northern part of the municipality (population: 3,213) remained as a smaller Avaldsnes Municipality. This new rural municipality surrounded the town of Kopervik which was a separate municipality. The name was somewhat confusing in that Kopervik (town) and Kopervik Municipality were different, neighboring areas. In 1917, the name of the municipality was changed to Stangaland Municipality to better distinguish the neighboring town.

On 1 January 1965, Skudenes Municipality (population: 2,678) was dissolved upon recommendations of the Schei Committee and its lands were merged with the following areas to form the new Karmøy Municipality:

- all of the town of Kopervik (population: 1,737)
- all of the town of Skudeneshavn (population: 1,275)
- all of the Skudenes Municipality (population: 3,583)
- all of the Åkra Municipality (population: 6,008)
- most of Avaldsnes Municipality (population: 4,153), except for the Gismarvik, Førre, and Stegaberg areas that became part of Tysvær Municipality
- most of Torvastad Municipality (population: 3,783), except for the island of Vibrandsøy (population: 70) which became part of Haugesund Municipality

=== Name ===
The municipality was originally named Kopervik in 1909, and it was named after the neighboring town of Kopervik. The name has an uncertain meaning, but the Old Norse form of the name may have been Koparvík. The first element is possibly named after a very small, nearby skerry, Koparnaglen, which was originally named Kobbanaglen. That name likely comes from the word kobbi which means "seal". The last element is vík which means "inlet" or "bay".

In 1917, the municipal name was changed to Stangaland, after the old Stangeland farm (Old Norse: Stangaland). The name was changed to help distinguish it from the neighboring town of Kopervik. The first element is the plural genitive case of stǫng which means "staff" or "pole". The last element is land which means "land" or "district".

=== Churches ===
The Church of Norway had one parish (sokn) within Stangaland Municipality. At the time of the municipal dissolution, it was part of the Kopervik prestegjeld and the Karmsund prosti (deanery) in the Diocese of Stavanger.

Churches in Stangaland Municipality
Parish (sokn)	Church name	Location of the church	Year built
Kopervik	Kopervik Church*	Kopervik	1861
*Note: this church was not actually located within the municipality, but rather it was within the neighboring town of Kopervik.

== Geography ==
The municipality encompassed the rural areas surrounding the coastal town of Kopervik on the central part of the island of Karmøy. The highest point in the municipality was the 132-metre (433 ft) tall mountain Søre Sålefjell. Avaldsnes Municipality was located to the north and east, Bokn Municipality was located to the southeast, Skudenes Municipality was located to the south, and Åkra Municipality was located to the west. The town of Kopervik was an exclave on the eastern side of Stangaland Municipality.

== Government ==
While it existed, Stangaland Municipality was responsible for primary education (through 10th grade), outpatient health services, senior citizen services, welfare and other social services, zoning, economic development, and municipal roads and utilities. The municipality was governed by a municipal council of directly elected representatives. The mayor was indirectly elected by a vote of the municipal council. The municipality was under the jurisdiction of the Karmsund District Court and the Gulating Court of Appeal.

=== Municipal council ===
The municipal council (Herredsstyre) of Stangaland Municipality was made up of 17 representatives that were elected to four year terms. The tables below show the historical composition of the council by political party.

Stangaland herredsstyre 1963–1965
Party name (in Norwegian)	Number of representatives
Labour Party (Arbeiderpartiet)	7
Conservative Party (Høyre)	3
Christian Democratic Party (Kristelig Folkeparti)	3
Liberal Party (Venstre)	4
Total number of members:	17
Note: On 1 January 1965, Stangaland Municipality became part of Karmøy Municipality.

Stangaland herredsstyre 1959–1963
Party name (in Norwegian)	Number of representatives
Labour Party (Arbeiderpartiet)	5
Conservative Party (Høyre)	3
Christian Democratic Party (Kristelig Folkeparti)	5
Liberal Party (Venstre)	3
Local List(s) (Lokale lister)	1
Total number of members:	17

Stangaland herredsstyre 1955–1959
Party name (in Norwegian)	Number of representatives
Labour Party (Arbeiderpartiet)	6
Christian Democratic Party (Kristelig Folkeparti)	3
Joint List(s) of Non-Socialist Parties (Borgerlige Felleslister)	8
Total number of members:	17

Stangaland herredsstyre 1951–1955
Party name (in Norwegian)	Number of representatives
Labour Party (Arbeiderpartiet)	4
Christian Democratic Party (Kristelig Folkeparti)	3
Joint List(s) of Non-Socialist Parties (Borgerlige Felleslister)	5
Total number of members:	12

Stangaland herredsstyre 1947–1951
Party name (in Norwegian)	Number of representatives
Labour Party (Arbeiderpartiet)	2
Christian Democratic Party (Kristelig Folkeparti)	4
Joint List(s) of Non-Socialist Parties (Borgerlige Felleslister)	6
Total number of members:	12

Stangaland herredsstyre 1945–1947
Party name (in Norwegian)	Number of representatives
Labour Party (Arbeiderpartiet)	4
Communist Party (Kommunistiske Parti)	1
Joint List(s) of Non-Socialist Parties (Borgerlige Felleslister)	7
Total number of members:	12

Stangaland herredsstyre 1937–1941*
Party name (in Norwegian)	Number of representatives
Labour Party (Arbeiderpartiet)	3
Joint List(s) of Non-Socialist Parties (Borgerlige Felleslister)	9
Total number of members:	12
Note: Due to the German occupation of Norway during World War II, no elections were held for new municipal councils until after the war ended in 1945.

=== Mayors ===
The mayor (Norwegian: ordfører) of Stangaland Municipality was the political leader of the municipality and the chairperson of the municipal council. The following people have held this position:

- 1909–1919: Hans Jakob Sund
- 1919–1922: Vermund Søndenaa
- 1923–1928: Hans Jakob Sund
- 1929–1934: Kristian Lundberg
- 1934–1941: Alf Sveinsvold
- 1941–1942: Hans Skaar-Pedersen
- 1942–1943: L. Budal
- 1943–1943: Sivert Nordstokke
- 1943–1944: Henrik Enochsen
- 1945–1959: Svein Mathias Andreassen Ytreland
- 1959–1965: Anker Økland (H)

== See also ==
- List of former municipalities of Norway
