= Avaldsnes Municipality =

Former municipality in Rogaland, Norway

Avaldsnes Municipality Avaldsnes herred
- Former municipality
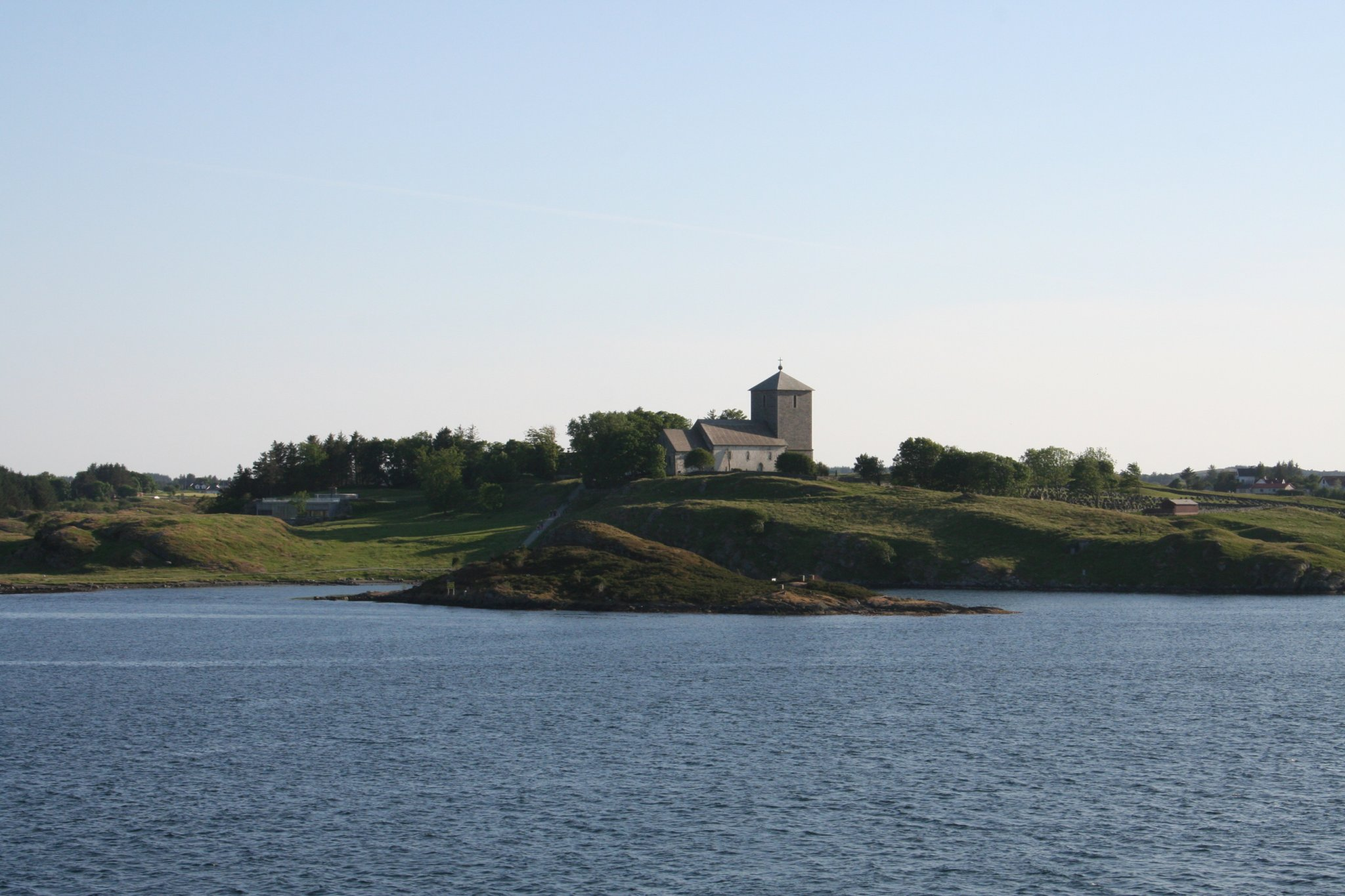
- View of northern Avaldsnes

- Rogaland within Norway

- Avaldsnes within Rogaland
- Coordinates: 59°21′16″N 05°16′37″E
- Country: Norway
- County: Rogaland
- District: Haugaland
- Established: 1 Jan 1838
  - Created as: Formannskapsdistrikt
- Disestablished: 1 Jan 1965
  - Succeeded by: Karmøy Municipality
- Administrative centre: Avaldsnes

Government
  - Mayor (1963–1964): Sverre K. Andersen (Ap)

Area (upon dissolution)
  - Total: 125.9 km^{2} (48.6 sq mi)
  - Rank: #396 in Norway
- Highest elevation: 249 m (817 ft)

Population (1964)
  - Total: 5,069
  - Rank: #191 in Norway
  - Density: 40.3/km^{2} (104/sq mi)
  - Change (10 years): ▲ +16.6%
- Demonym: Avaldsnesbu

Official language
  - Norwegian form: Neutral
- Time zone: UTC+01:00 (CET)
  - Summer (DST): UTC+02:00 (CEST)
- ISO 3166 code: NO-1147

Avaldsnes is a former municipality in Rogaland county, Norway. The 125.9-square-kilometre (48.6 sq mi) municipality existed from 1838 until its dissolution in 1965. The area is now divided between Karmøy Municipality and Tysvær Municipality in the traditional district of Haugaland. The administrative centre was the village of Avaldsnes on the island of Karmøy. The area was an ancient centre of power on the west coast of Norway and is the site of one of Norway's more important areas of cultural history. The municipality encompassed the area surrounding the Førresfjorden and the area surrounding the central part of the Karmsundet strait, plus the central part of the island of Karmøy.

Prior to its dissolution in 1965, the 125.9-square-kilometre (48.6 sq mi) municipality was the 396th largest by area out of the 525 municipalities in Norway. Avaldsnes Municipality was the 191st most populous municipality in Norway with a population of about 5,069. The municipality's population density was 40.3 inhabitants per square kilometre (104/sq mi) and its population had increased by 16.6% over the previous 10-year period.

== General information ==
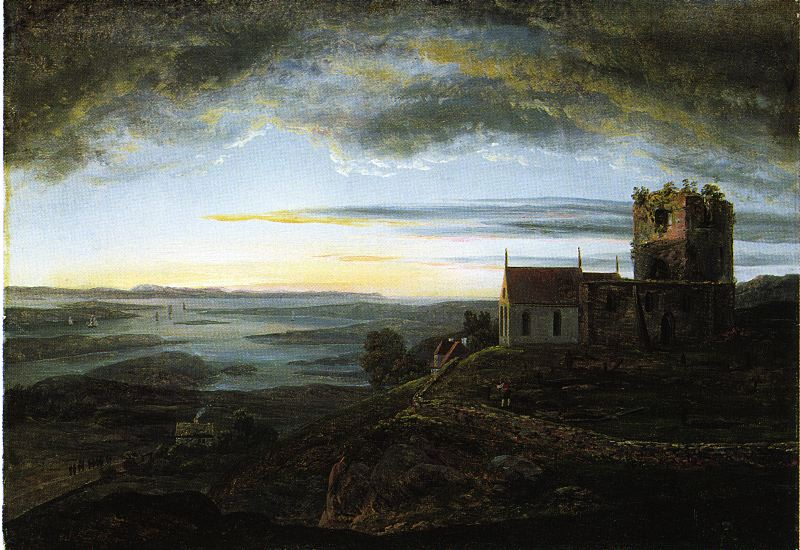
Painting of Avaldsnes Credit: Johan Christian Dahl

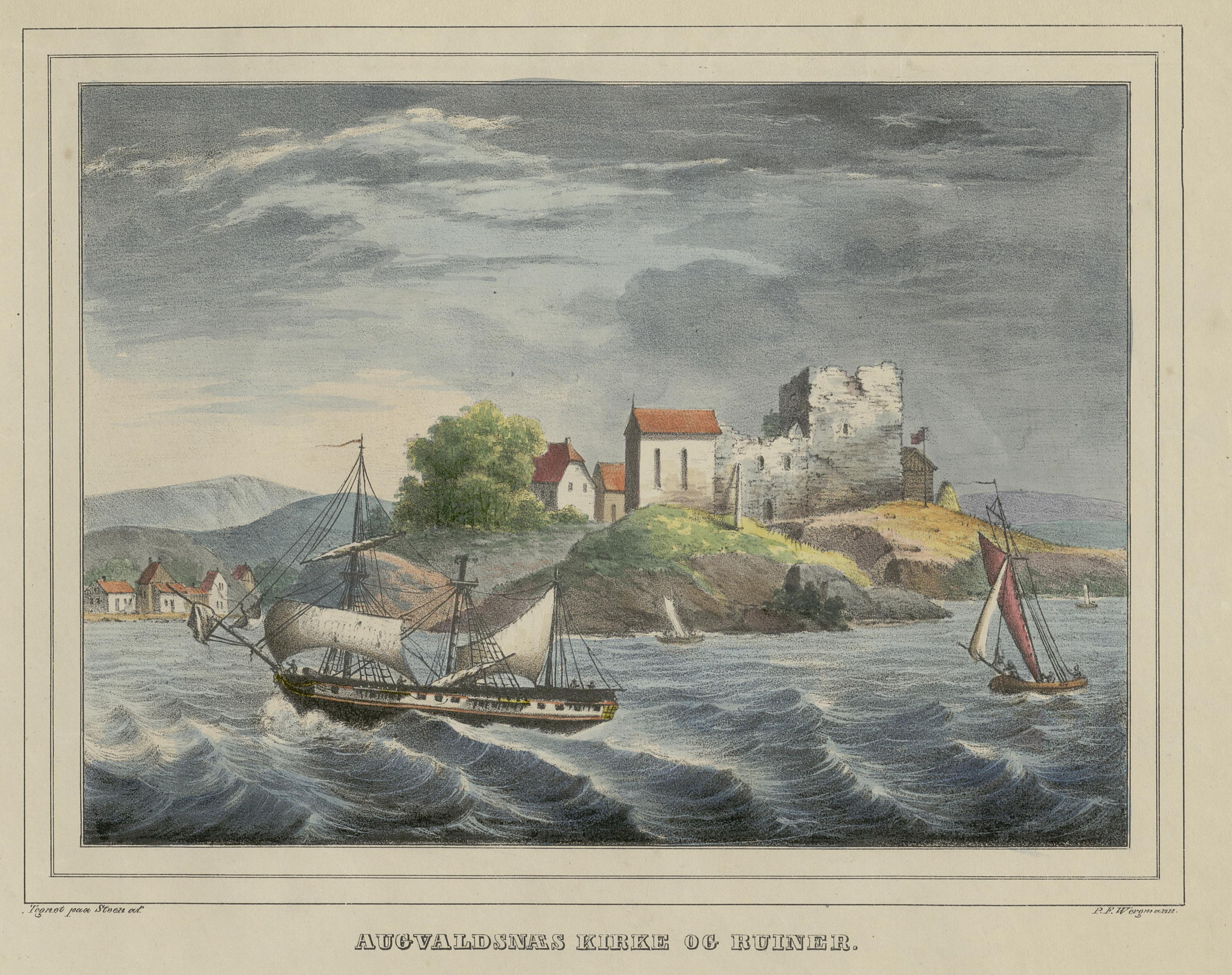
Painting of Avaldsnes Credit: Peter Frederik Wergmann

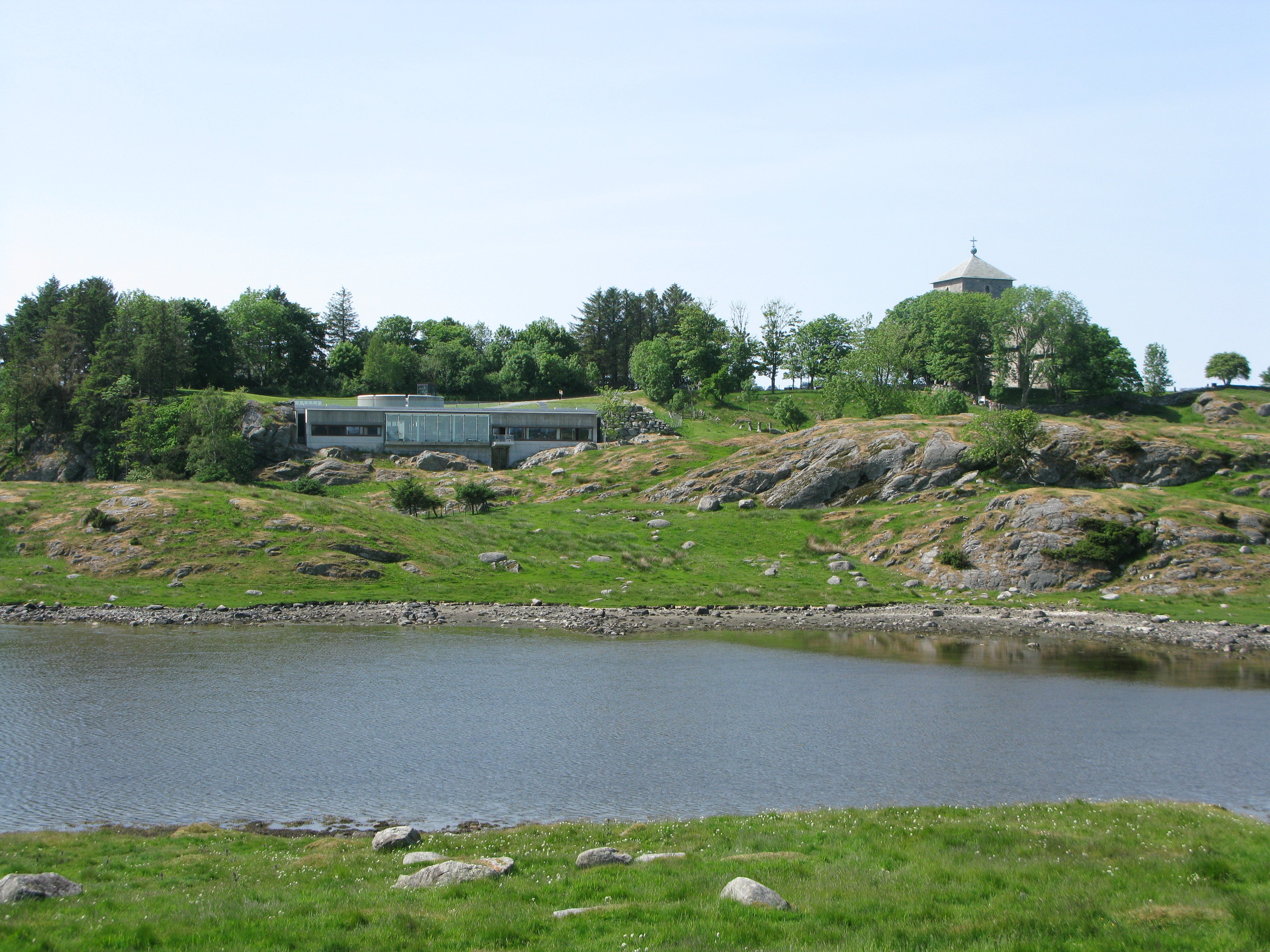
Nordvegen History Center in Avaldsnes

The parish of Avaldsnæs was established as a municipality on 1 January 1838 (see formannskapsdistrikt law). On 16 August 1866, the local village of Kopervik was declared to be a town. Towns could not be part of another municipality, so the village of Kopervik (population: 737) was separated from Avaldsnes Municipality to become the new Kopervik Municipality. This division left Avaldsnes Municipality with 4,735 inhabitants.

On 1 January 1909, Avaldsnes Municipality was divided into two parts. The rural areas on the island of Karmøy surrounding the small town of Kopervik (population: 1,001) to form the new Kopervik herred (later called Stangaland Municipality). The rest of Avaldsnes (population: 3,213) remained as smaller Avaldsnes Municipality.

During the 1960s, there were many municipal mergers across Norway due to the work of the Schei Committee. On 1 January 1965, Avaldsnes Municipality was dissolved and its lands were transferred to neighboring municipalities as follows:

- the areas of Avaldsnes located west of the Førresfjorden (population: 4,153) was merged with Skudenes Municipality, Torvastad Municipality, Åkra Municipality, and with the towns of Kopervik and Skudeneshavn to form the new Karmøy Municipality
- the areas of Avaldsnes located east of the Førresfjorden, including the districts of Førre, Gismarvik, and Stegaberg, (population: 994) were merged into the neighboring Tysvær Municipality

=== Name ===
The municipality (originally the parish) is named after the old Avaldsnes farm (Old Norse: Ǫgvaldsnes) since the historic Avaldsnes Church was built there. The first element comes from the old male name Ǫgvaldr or Ágvaldr (or the more modern Faroese version Øgvaldur). The last element comes from the word nes which means "headland".

=== Churches ===
The Church of Norway had one parish (sokn) within Avaldsnes Municipality. At the time of the municipal dissolution, it was part of the Avaldsnes prestegjeld and the Karmsund prosti (deanery) in the Diocese of Stavanger.

Churches in Avaldsnes Municipality
Parish (sokn)	Church name	Location of the church	Year built
Avaldsnes	Avaldsnes Church	Avaldsnes	c. 1250
Førdesfjorden	Førre Church	Førre	1893

== Geography ==
The municipality encompassed the area surrounding the Førresfjorden and the area surrounding the central part of the Karmsundet strait, plus the central part of the island of Karmøy. The highest point in the municipality was the 249-metre (817 ft) tall mountain Krokavassnuten, located on the mainland just west of the village of Førre.

Haugesund Municipality was located to the north, Skjold Municipality was located to the northeast, Tysvær Municipality was located to the east, Bokn Municipality was located to the southeast, Stangaland Municipality and the town of Kopervik were located to the south, Utsira Municipality was located to the west, and Torvastad Municipality was located to the northwest.

== Government ==
While it existed, Avaldsnes Municipality was responsible for primary education (through 10th grade), outpatient health services, senior citizen services, welfare and other social services, zoning, economic development, and municipal roads and utilities. The municipality was governed by a municipal council of directly elected representatives. The mayor was indirectly elected by a vote of the municipal council. The municipality was under the jurisdiction of the Karmsund District Court and the Gulating Court of Appeal.

=== Municipal council ===
The municipal council (Herredsstyre) of Avaldsnes Municipality was made up of 21 representatives that were elected to four year terms. The tables below show the historical composition of the council by political party.

Avaldsnes herredsstyre 1963–1965
Party name (in Norwegian)	Number of representatives
Labour Party (Arbeiderpartiet)	8
Conservative Party (Høyre)	3
Christian Democratic Party (Kristelig Folkeparti)	2
Centre Party (Senterpartiet)	1
Liberal Party (Venstre)	2
Local List(s) (Lokale lister)	5
Total number of members:	21
Note: On 1 January 1965, Avaldsnes Municipality was divided between Karmøy Municipality and Tysvær Municipality.

Avaldsnes herredsstyre 1959–1963
Party name (in Norwegian)	Number of representatives
Labour Party (Arbeiderpartiet)	6
Conservative Party (Høyre)	1
Christian Democratic Party (Kristelig Folkeparti)	5
Liberal Party (Venstre)	3
Local List(s) (Lokale lister)	1
Total number of members:	21

Avaldsnes herredsstyre 1955–1959
Party name (in Norwegian)	Number of representatives
Labour Party (Arbeiderpartiet)	8
Joint List(s) of Non-Socialist Parties (Borgerlige Felleslister)	9
Local List(s) (Lokale lister)	4
Total number of members:	21

Avaldsnes herredsstyre 1951–1955
Party name (in Norwegian)	Number of representatives
Labour Party (Arbeiderpartiet)	6
Joint list of the Conservative Party (Høyre) and the Farmers' Party (Bondepartiet)	2
Joint list of the Liberal Party (Venstre) and Christian Democratic Party (Kristelig Folkeparti)	4
Local List(s) (Lokale lister)	8
Total number of members:	20

Avaldsnes herredsstyre 1947–1951
Party name (in Norwegian)	Number of representatives
Labour Party (Arbeiderpartiet)	6
Christian Democratic Party (Kristelig Folkeparti)	2
Liberal Party (Venstre)	2
Joint List(s) of Non-Socialist Parties (Borgerlige Felleslister)	3
Local List(s) (Lokale lister)	7
Total number of members:	20

Avaldsnes herredsstyre 1945–1947
Party name (in Norwegian)	Number of representatives
Labour Party (Arbeiderpartiet)	8
Christian Democratic Party (Kristelig Folkeparti)	1
Liberal Party (Venstre)	2
Local List(s) (Lokale lister)	9
Total number of members:	20

Avaldsnes herredsstyre 1937–1941*
Party name (in Norwegian)	Number of representatives
Labour Party (Arbeiderpartiet)	7
Conservative Party (Høyre)	2
Joint List(s) of Non-Socialist Parties (Borgerlige Felleslister)	6
Local List(s) (Lokale lister)	5
Total number of members:	20
Note: Due to the German occupation of Norway during World War II, no elections were held for new municipal councils until after the war ended in 1945.

=== Mayors ===
The mayor (Norwegian: ordfører) of Avaldsnes Municipality was the political leader of the municipality and the chairperson of the municipal council. The following people have held this position:

- 1838–1839: Niels Baardsen Scheye
- 1840–1843: Rev. Johan Lyder Brun
- 1844–1851: Henrik Eriksen Thuestad
- 1852–1853: Simon Gudmundsen Stave
- 1854–1855: Christian Bertelsen
- 1856–1857: Colben Eliassen Hinderager
- 1858–1861: Simon Gudmundsen Stave
- 1862–1863: Helge Knudsen Sørvaag
- 1864–1875: Simon Gudmundsen Stave
- 1876–1879: Colben Eliassen Hinderager
- 1880–1882: Simon Gudmundsen Stave
- 1883–1888: Torkel Lindeland
- 1888–1891: Erik H. Thuestad
- 1892–1893: Josef J. Vaage
- 1894–1897: Lauritz P. Sund
- 1898–1916: Erik H. Thuestad
- 1917–1922: Peder Johan Skeie
- 1923–1925: Odd Aarsand
- 1925–1928: Johannes Kolnes
- 1928–1932: Aadne Utvik
- 1932–1941: Peder Johan Skeie
- 1942–1944: Magnus Utvik
- 1944–1945: Daniel Håvik
- 1945–1945: Peder Johan Skeie
- 1945–1947: Anders Olafsen
- 1947–1955: Wilhelm Østhus
- 1955–1957: Sigvart Røkke (Ap)
- 1957–1963: Wilhelm Østhus
- 1963–1964: Sverre K. Andersen (Ap)

== See also ==
- List of former municipalities of Norway
