= Skudenes Municipality =

Former municipality in Rogaland, Norway

Skudenes Municipality Skudenes herred
- Former municipality
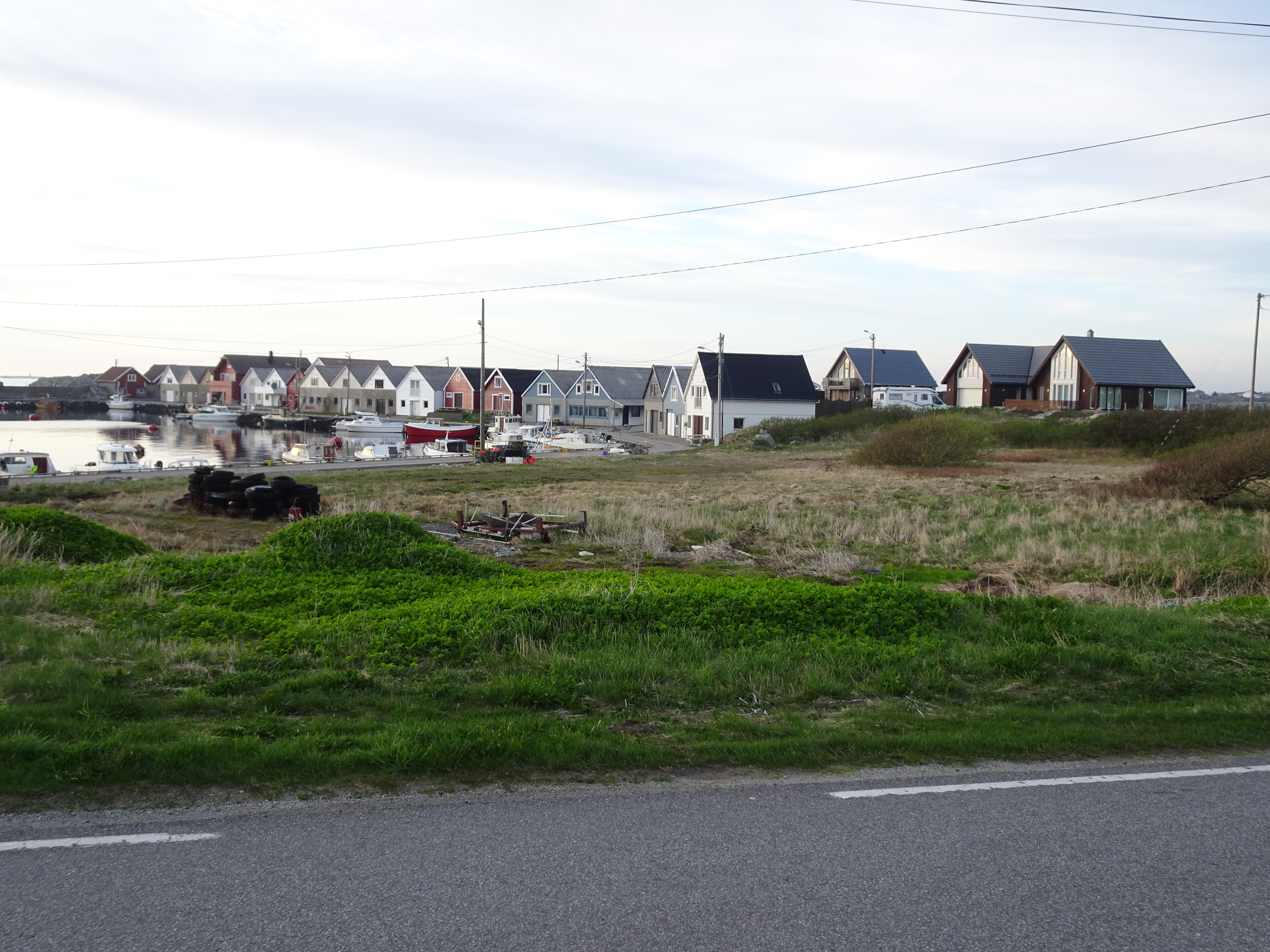
- View of the Ferkingstad harbour

- Rogaland within Norway

- Skudenes within Rogaland
- Coordinates: 59°09′00″N 05°15′23″E
- Country: Norway
- County: Rogaland
- District: Haugaland
- Established: 1 Jan 1838
  - Created as: Formannskapsdistrikt
- Disestablished: 1 Jan 1965
  - Succeeded by: Karmøy Municipality
- Administrative centre: Skudeneshavn

Government
  - Mayor (1959–1964): Hans Magnus Lie (LL)

Area (upon dissolution)
  - Total: 67.5 km^{2} (26.1 sq mi)
  - Rank: #455 in Norway
- Highest elevation: 109 m (358 ft)

Population (1964)
  - Total: 3,544
  - Rank: #265 in Norway
  - Density: 52.5/km^{2} (136/sq mi)
  - Change (10 years): ▲ +4.6%
- Demonym: Skudnesbu

Official language
  - Norwegian form: Neutral
- Time zone: UTC+01:00 (CET)
  - Summer (DST): UTC+02:00 (CEST)
- ISO 3166 code: NO-1150

Skudenes is a former municipality in Rogaland county, Norway. The 67.5-square-kilometre (26.1 sq mi) municipality existed from 1838 until its dissolution in 1965. The area is now part of Karmøy Municipality in the traditional district of Haugaland. The administrative centre was the town of Skudeneshavn (which technically was a separate municipality). Notable villages in the municipality included Sandve and Ferkingstad. Since 1965, the name Skudenes refers to the southern part of Karmøy island.

Prior to its dissolution in 1965, the 67.5-square-kilometre (26.1 sq mi) municipality was the 455th largest by area out of the 525 municipalities in Norway. Skudenes Municipality was the 265th most populous municipality in Norway with a population of about 3,544. The municipality's population density was 52.5 inhabitants per square kilometre (136/sq mi) and its population had increased by 4.6% over the previous 10-year period.

== General information ==
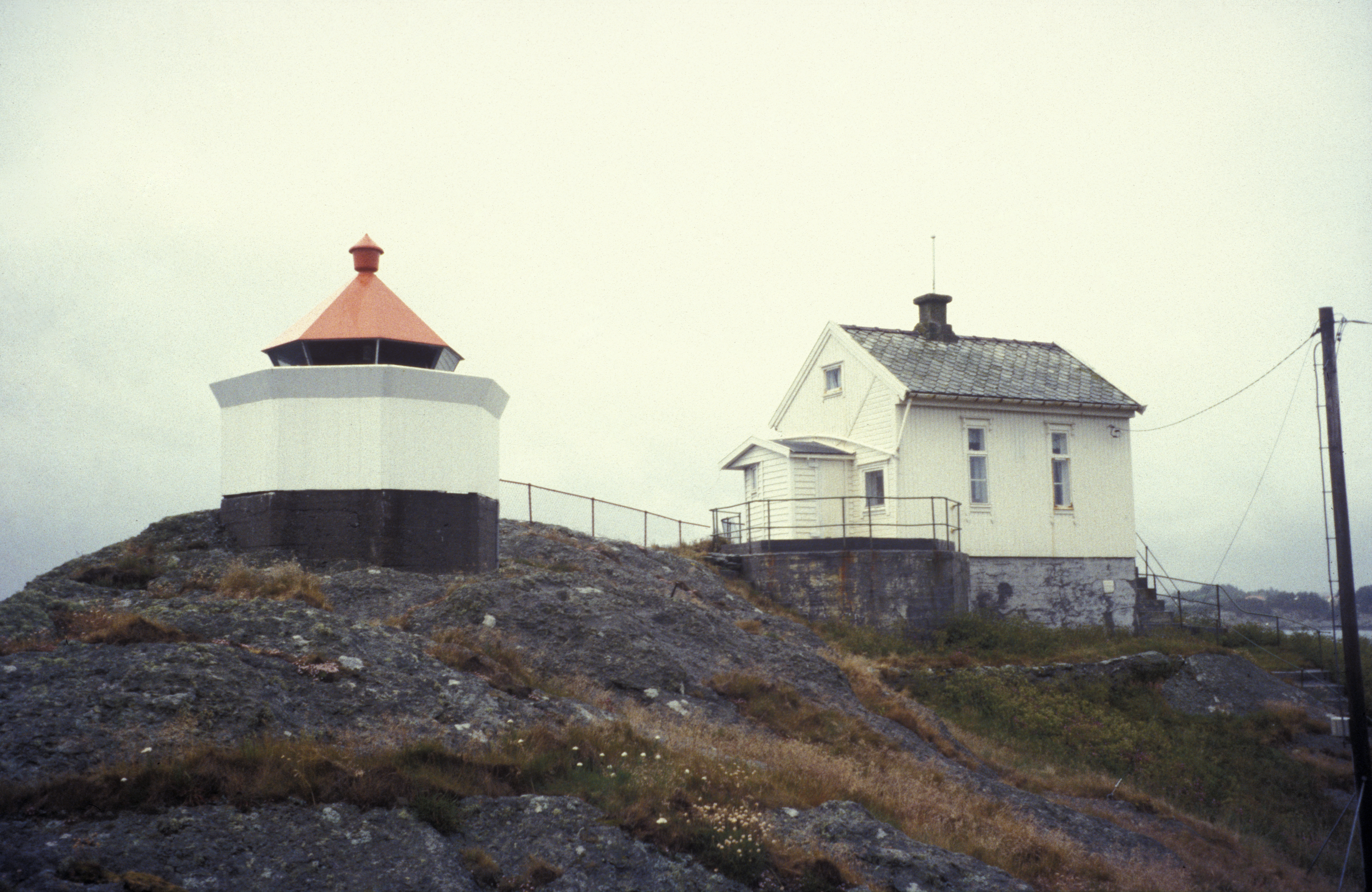
Skudenes Lighthouse

The parish of Skudesnæs (later spelled Skudenes) was established as a municipality on 1 January 1838 (see formannskapsdistrikt law). In 1849, Skudesnæs Municipality was divided as follows:

- the three islands of Vestre Bokn, Austre Bokn, and Ognøya (population: 1,035) became the new Bukken Municipality
- the rest of municipality (population: 5,044) remained as a smaller Skudesnæs Municipality.

In 1857, the port village of Skudeneshavn on the southern tip of the island of Karmøy was designated as a ladested (a port of lading). Shortly thereafter, on 10 February 1858, Skudeneshavn (population: 1,209) was separated from Skudenes Municipality and it became a separate municipality of its own. The split left Skudenes with a population of 5,044.

On 1 January 1892, Skudenes Municipality was divided again. The northern part of the municipality (population: 1,962) became the new Aakre Municipality and the southern part (population: 2,732) continued as a smaller Skudenes Municipality. This division shrunk the size of Skudenes Municipality from 101 square kilometres (39 sq mi) to 68 square kilometres (26 sq mi).

On 1 January 1965, Skudenes Municipality (population: 3,583) was dissolved upon recommendations of the Schei Committee and its lands were merged with the following areas to form the new Karmøy Municipality:

- all of the town of Kopervik (population: 1,737)
- all of the town of Skudeneshavn (population: 1,275)
- all of the Stangaland Municipality (population: 2,678)
- all of the Åkra Municipality (population: 6,008)
- most of Avaldsnes Municipality (population: 4,153), except for the Gismarvik, Førre, and Stegaberg areas that became part of Tysvær Municipality
- most of Torvastad Municipality (population: 3,783), except for the island of Vibrandsøy (population: 70) which became part of Haugesund Municipality

=== Name ===
The municipality (originally the parish) is named after the Skudenes peninsula (Old Norse: Skútunes) at the south end of the island of Karmøy. The first element is the genitive case of skúta which means "rock wall that is sticking out", referring to the rocky islets and skerries that lie just off the shore of the peninsula. The last element is nes which means "headland".

=== Churches ===
The Church of Norway had one parish (sokn) within Skudenes Municipality. At the time of the municipal dissolution, it was part of the Skudenes prestegjeld and the Karmsund prosti (deanery) in the Diocese of Stavanger.

Churches in Skudenes Municipality
Parish (sokn)	Church name	Location of the church	Year built
Falnes	Falnes Church*	Skudeneshavn	1895
Ferkingstad	Ferkingstad Church	Ferkingstad	1895
*Note: this church was not actually located within the municipality, but rather it was within the neighboring town of Skudeneshavn.

== Geography ==
The municipality originally encompassed the southern part of the island of Karmøy plus the three smaller islands to the east: Vestre Bokn, Austre Bokn, and Ognøya. In 1849, the three smaller islands became the new Bokn Municipality. After that, Skudenes Municipality just included most of the southern part of the island of Karmøy. The highest point in the municipality was the 109-metre (358 ft) tall point located just northeast of the village of Sandve.

Åkra Municipality was located to the northwest, Stangaland Municipality was located to the northeast, Bokn Municipality was located to the east, Kvitsøy Municipality was located to the southeast, and the North Sea was located to the west.

== Government ==
While it existed, Skudenes Municipality was responsible for primary education (through 10th grade), outpatient health services, senior citizen services, welfare and other social services, zoning, economic development, and municipal roads and utilities. The municipality was governed by a municipal council of directly elected representatives. The mayor was indirectly elected by a vote of the municipal council. The municipality was under the jurisdiction of the Karmsund District Court and the Gulating Court of Appeal.

=== Municipal council ===
The municipal council (Herredsstyre) of Skudenes Municipality was made up of 17 representatives that were elected to four year terms. The tables below show the historical composition of the council by political party.

Skudenes herredsstyre 1963–1965
Party name (in Norwegian)	Number of representatives
Labour Party (Arbeiderpartiet)	4
Christian Democratic Party (Kristelig Folkeparti)	4
Liberal Party (Venstre)	4
Local List(s) (Lokale lister)	5
Total number of members:	17
Note: On 1 January 1965, Skudenes Municipality became part of Karmøy Municipality.

Skudenes herredsstyre 1959–1963
Party name (in Norwegian)	Number of representatives
Labour Party (Arbeiderpartiet)	4
Christian Democratic Party (Kristelig Folkeparti)	5
Liberal Party (Venstre)	4
Local List(s) (Lokale lister)	4
Total number of members:	17

Skudenes herredsstyre 1955–1959
Party name (in Norwegian)	Number of representatives
Labour Party (Arbeiderpartiet)	6
Christian Democratic Party (Kristelig Folkeparti)	3
Liberal Party (Venstre)	5
Local List(s) (Lokale lister)	3
Total number of members:	17

Skudenes herredsstyre 1951–1955
Party name (in Norwegian)	Number of representatives
Labour Party (Arbeiderpartiet)	4
Christian Democratic Party (Kristelig Folkeparti)	5
Liberal Party (Venstre)	4
Local List(s) (Lokale lister)	3
Total number of members:	16

Skudenes herredsstyre 1947–1951
Party name (in Norwegian)	Number of representatives
Labour Party (Arbeiderpartiet)	4
Christian Democratic Party (Kristelig Folkeparti)	1
Liberal Party (Venstre)	8
Joint List(s) of Non-Socialist Parties (Borgerlige Felleslister)	3
Total number of members:	16

Skudenes herredsstyre 1945–1947
Party name (in Norwegian)	Number of representatives
Labour Party (Arbeiderpartiet)	6
Joint list of the Liberal Party (Venstre) and the Radical People's Party (Radikale Folkepartiet)	3
Joint List(s) of Non-Socialist Parties (Borgerlige Felleslister)	6
Local List(s) (Lokale lister)	1
Total number of members:	16

Skudenes herredsstyre 1937–1941*
Party name (in Norwegian)	Number of representatives
Labour Party (Arbeiderpartiet)	4
Joint List(s) of Non-Socialist Parties (Borgerlige Felleslister)	11
Local List(s) (Lokale lister)	1
Total number of members:	16
Note: Due to the German occupation of Norway during World War II, no elections were held for new municipal councils until after the war ended in 1945.

=== Mayors ===
The mayor (Norwegian: ordfører) of Skudenes Municipality was the political leader of the municipality and the chairperson of the municipal council. The following people have held this position:

- 1838–1843: Andreas Hansen
- 1844–1851: Ole Kjeldsen
- 1852–1855: Johan Conrad Hemsen
- 1856–1857: Andreas Hansen
- 1858–1865: Ole Sivertsen Hemnæs
- 1866–1885: Jakob Midhaug
- 1886–1904: Lars Johannessen Falnæs
- 1905–1907: Hans Lie
- 1908–1910: Ole Kvilhaug
- 1910–1913: Hans Lie
- 1913–1925: Ole Kvilhaug
- 1925–1931: Lars Dale
- 1932–1941: Daniel Aadnesen
- 1941–1941: Lars Dale
- 1941–1945: Lorentz Løland
- 1946–1951: Ole G. Ferkingstad
- 1951–1955: Oddmund Jøsendal(KrF)
- 1955–1959: Lars Dale (LL)
- 1959–1964: Hans Magnus Lie (LL)

== See also ==
- List of former municipalities of Norway
