= Haugaland =

Traditional district in South-Western Norway

Coordinates: 59°04′16″N 5°55′45″E

Haugaland Haugesund Peninsula
- District, peninsula
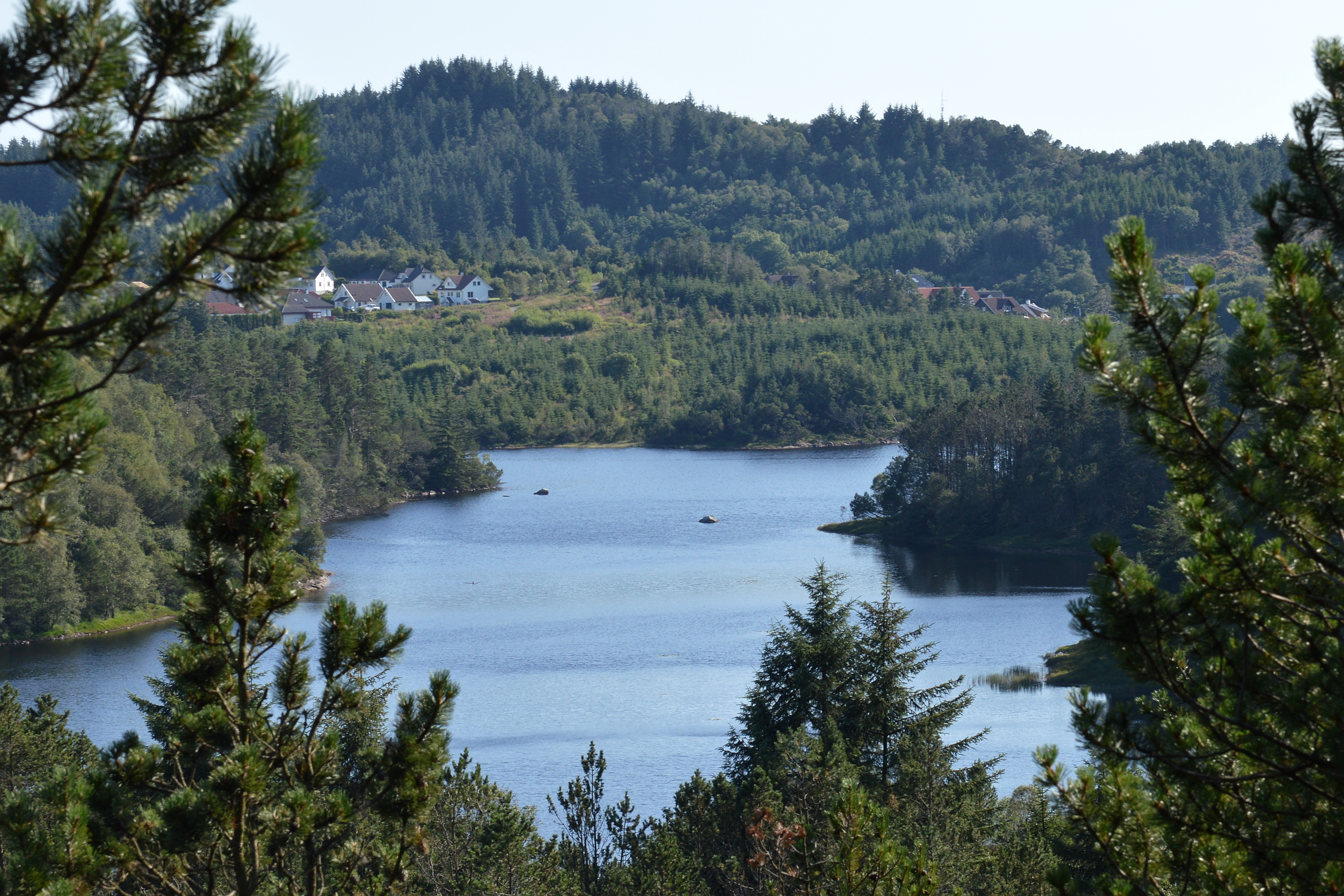
- Eivindsvannet, Djupadalen

- Haugaland (within Rogaland county)
- Country: Norway
- County: Rogaland
- Region: South-Western Norway
- Municipalities: Karmøy, Haugesund, Tysvær, Vindafjord, Bokn, Utsira (Note: In some definitions, the municipalities of Sveio and Etne are included. The total area and population therefore depend on whether these municipalities are counted as part of the Haugaland.)
- Regional Centre: Haugesund

Population (2025)
  - Total: 104,058–113,903
- Demonym: Haugalending

The Haugaland (Haugalandet), or the Haugesund Peninsula (Haugesundshalvøyen), is a peninsula and traditional district in the northwestern part of Rogaland county, Norway. The area lies between the Boknafjord to the south and the Bømlafjord, part of the outer Hardangerfjord, to the north. The area partially overlaps with the metropolitan Haugesund Region.

In a traditional geographical and cultural sense, the Haugaland comprises the municipalities of Haugesund, Karmøy, Tysvær, Vindafjord, Bokn, and Utsira. Together, these cover an area of 1,402 square kilometres (541 sq mi) and had a population of 104,058 in 2025. This definition represents the most widely accepted understanding of the Haugaland, with Haugesund serving as the regional centre, while other towns include Kopervik, Åkrehamn, and Skudeneshavn on Karmøy.

In a broader regional context, the municipalities of Sveio and Etne, located south of the Bømlafjord, Bjoafjord, and Skånevikfjord, are sometimes also included in the Haugaland. This expanded definition gives a total area of 2,383 square kilometres (920 sq mi) and a population of 113,903 (2025). Ølen serves as a minor regional centre in the inner part of the district.

The municipalities of Stord, Fitjar, Bømlo, Tysnes, and Kvinnherad in Sunnhordland are not normally considered part of the Haugaland, but instead belong to a separate historical and geographical district further north. In certain administrative and legal contexts, however, Sunnhordland and the Haugaland are treated as a single region. Examples include the Haugaland and Sunnhordland District Court, which since 2021 has covered 14 municipalities in Rogaland and Vestland counties, and the former Haugaland and Sunnhordland Police District (2002–2015). This usage is functional in nature and differs from the traditional geographical delimitation.

== Name and etymology ==
The Haugaland was traditionally regarded as part of Ryfylke, but that term is now used only for the areas further east. The name derives from the Old Norse farm name Haugar and originally referred to the area surrounding the historic farm and, later, the town of Haugesund. The form Haugarlandet occurs in older usage, and the peninsula has also been referred to as the Haugesundshalvøyen (Haugesund Peninsula).

The name Haugalandet came into use in the 19th century, likely introduced by Ivar Aasen, who used it in the poem "Haraldshaugen", written after his visit to Haraldshaugen and published in Folkevennen in 1853. Around 1900, the name became more widespread, particularly within the Nynorsk movement, the temperance movement, and the labour movement, which often used the form Haugarlandet, while the bourgeoisie in Haugesund preferred the term Haugesund halvø (Haugesund Peninsula). From the 1970s onward, Haugalandet has been used in public administration and regional planning.

== Municipalities ==
The Haugaland is traditionally divided into six municipalities in Rogaland:

Number	Map	Name	Adm. centre	Population (2025)	Area km²	Lang. form	Mayor	Political party
1149	Karmøy Municipality	Karmøy Municipality	Kopervik	43,723	229.90	Neutral	Leiv Arne Marhaug	Conservative
1106	Haugesund Municipality	Haugesund Municipality	Haugesund	38,441	72.67	Neutral	Nils Konrad Bua	Conservative
1146	Tysvær Municipality	Tysvær Municipality	Aksdal	11,715	425.41	Neutral	Monika Lindanger	Conservative
1160	Vindafjord Municipality	Vindafjord Municipality	Ølensjøen	9,069	620.59	Nynorsk	Ole Johan Vierdal	Centre
1145	Bokn Municipality	Bokn Municipality	Føresvik	893	47.17	Nynorsk	Egil Våge	Centre
1151	Utsira Municipality	Utsira Municipality	Utsira	217	6.32	Neutral	Marte Eide Klovning	Community

=== Municipal history ===
In 1838, the area was divided into the municipalities of Skjold, Nedstrand, Avaldsnes, Torvastad, Skudenes, and Vikedal. Tysvær was separated from Skjold in 1849, followed by Vats in 1891. Sjernarøy was separated from Nedstrand Municipality in 1868. From Torvastad, Haugesund was separated in 1854, Skåre in 1881, and Utsira in 1924. From Skudenes, Bokn was separated in 1849, Skudeneshavn in 1857, and Åkra in 1892. Kopervik was separated from Avaldsnes in 1866 and Stangaland in 1908, while Imsland and Sandeid were separated from Vikedal in 1922. Skåre was incorporated into Haugesund in 1958.

In 1965, the municipalities of Avaldsnes, Kopervik, Skudenes, Skudeneshavn, Stangaland, Torvastad, and Åkra were merged to form Karmøy Municipality. At the same time, parts of Avaldsnes were transferred to Tysvær Municipality, together with parts of Skjold and the entirety of Nedstrand. The remainder of Skjold was merged with Imsland, Sandeid, Vats, and Vikedal to form Vindafjord Municipality. Ølen Municipality was transferred from Hordaland to Rogaland in 2002 and merged into Vindafjord in 2006. Sjernarøy Municipality was incorporated into Finnøy Municipality in 1965.

== Administration ==
=== Haugaland Council ===
Haugaland Council (Haugalandrådet) is the consultative body for the municipalities that make up Haugaland. Council members are the mayors and councilors. Haugaland Council contributes to the cooperation between the member municipalities, and safeguard the region's interests in relation to neighboring regions, county and national bodies.

=== Haugaland museums ===
Haugaland museums (Haugalandmuseene) is the regional museum for the area of Rogaland County north of Boknafjorden. Haugalandmuseene was founded in 2005. Haugalandmuseene has a decentralized structure, with administration located at the Karmsund folk museum. Haugalandmuseene has locations in Haugesund, Tysvær, Vindafjord, Bokn, and Utsira. The regional museum has the responsibility of organizing joint actions with the museums and the municipalities.

=== Haugaland and Sunnhordland District Court ===
The Haugaland and Sunnhordland District Court is the local Court of Justice that has jurisdiction over the traditional district of Haugaland (plus the neighboring Sunnhordland district). One of its courthouses is located in Haugesund at the City Hall Square. The Court’s decisions may be appealed to Gulating Court of Appeal based in Bergen, which covers the counties of Vestland and Rogaland.

== Population development ==
The table shows the population development in Haugalandet in the years 1769–2001 based on the municipal boundaries from 2002.

Kommuner	1769	1801	1855	1900	1950	2001
Bokn	242	306	1,017	789	791	766
Haugesund	843	917	2,668	10,664	23,865	30,705
Karmøy	3,717	4,545	10,773	12,662	19,311	37,083
Tysvær	1,902	2,306	5,463	4,733	5,265	9,026
Utsira	86	94	264	325	428	235
Vindafjord	1,980	2,412	4,821	4,345	4,655	4,822
Haugalandet	8,770	10,580	25,006	33,518	54,315	82,637

== Urban areas ==
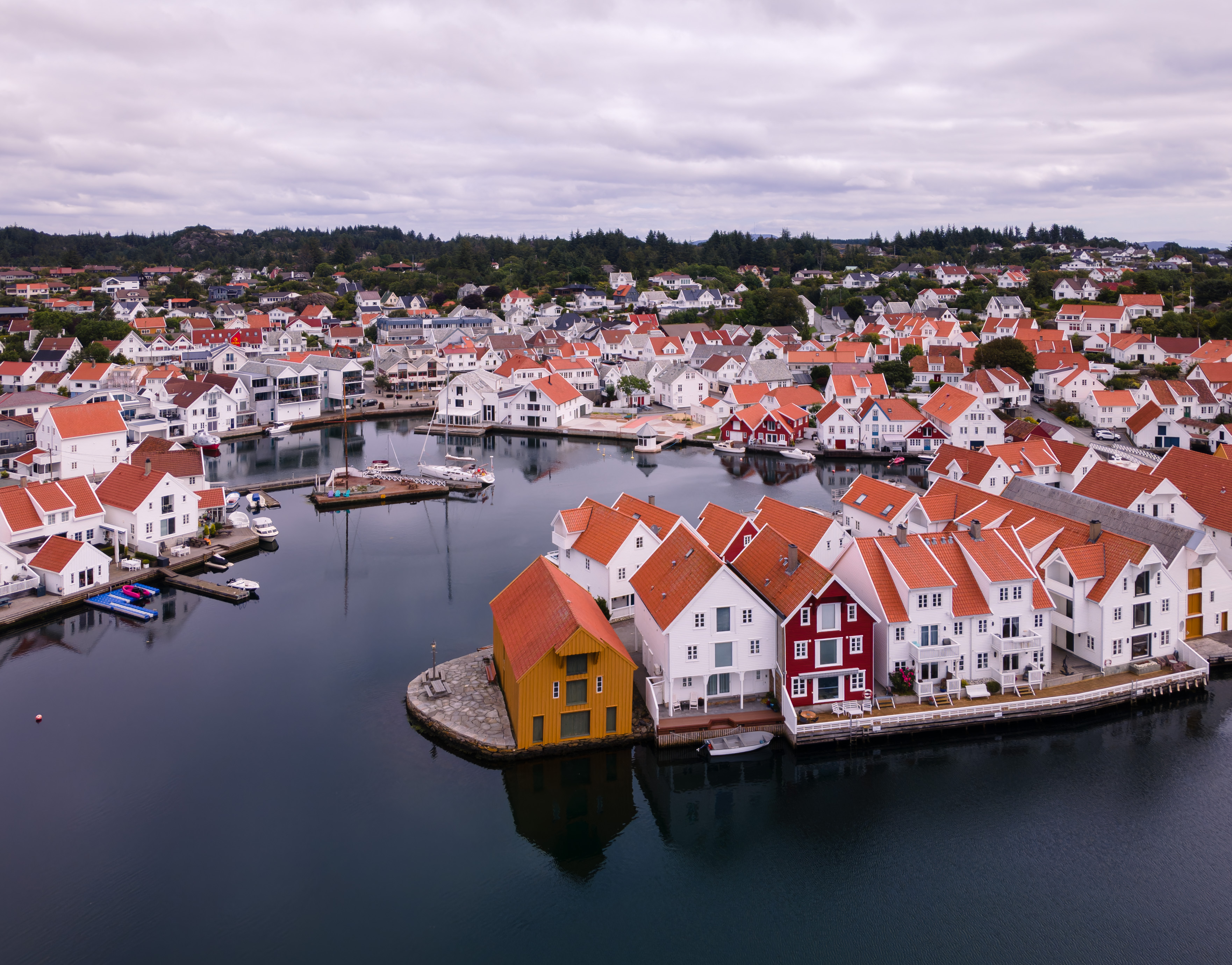
Skudeneshavn, known for its white-painted wooden houses in the Empire style from the 19th century.

Urban areas in the Haugaland as of 1 January 2025 include:

- Haugesund (47,346) (Note: The urban area of Haugesund includes parts of both Haugesund and Karmøy municipalities, with 37,613 residents in Haugesund and 9,733 in the northern parts of Karmøy.)
- Kopervik (12,006)
- Åkrehamn (8,202)
- Førre (5,710)
- Skudeneshavn (3,360)
- Avaldsnes (2,876)
- Ølensjøen (1,410)
- Skjold (997)
- Grinde (946)
- Aksdal (837)
- Sandeid (762)
- Ferkingstad (723)
- Vikedal (518)
- Ølensvåg (487)
- Sandve (329)
- Østenstad (304)
- Slåttevik (304)
- Føresvik (304)
- Nedstrand (271)

=== City status ===
Haugesund was granted city status as a ladested (seaport town) in 1854 and was upgraded to a kjøpstad (market town) in 1866. Skudeneshavn was granted ladested status in 1857, and Kopervik in 1866; both lost their city status in 1965, but it was reinstated in 1996 by municipal resolution. Åkrehamn was granted city status in 2002, also by municipal resolution.

== Image gallery ==
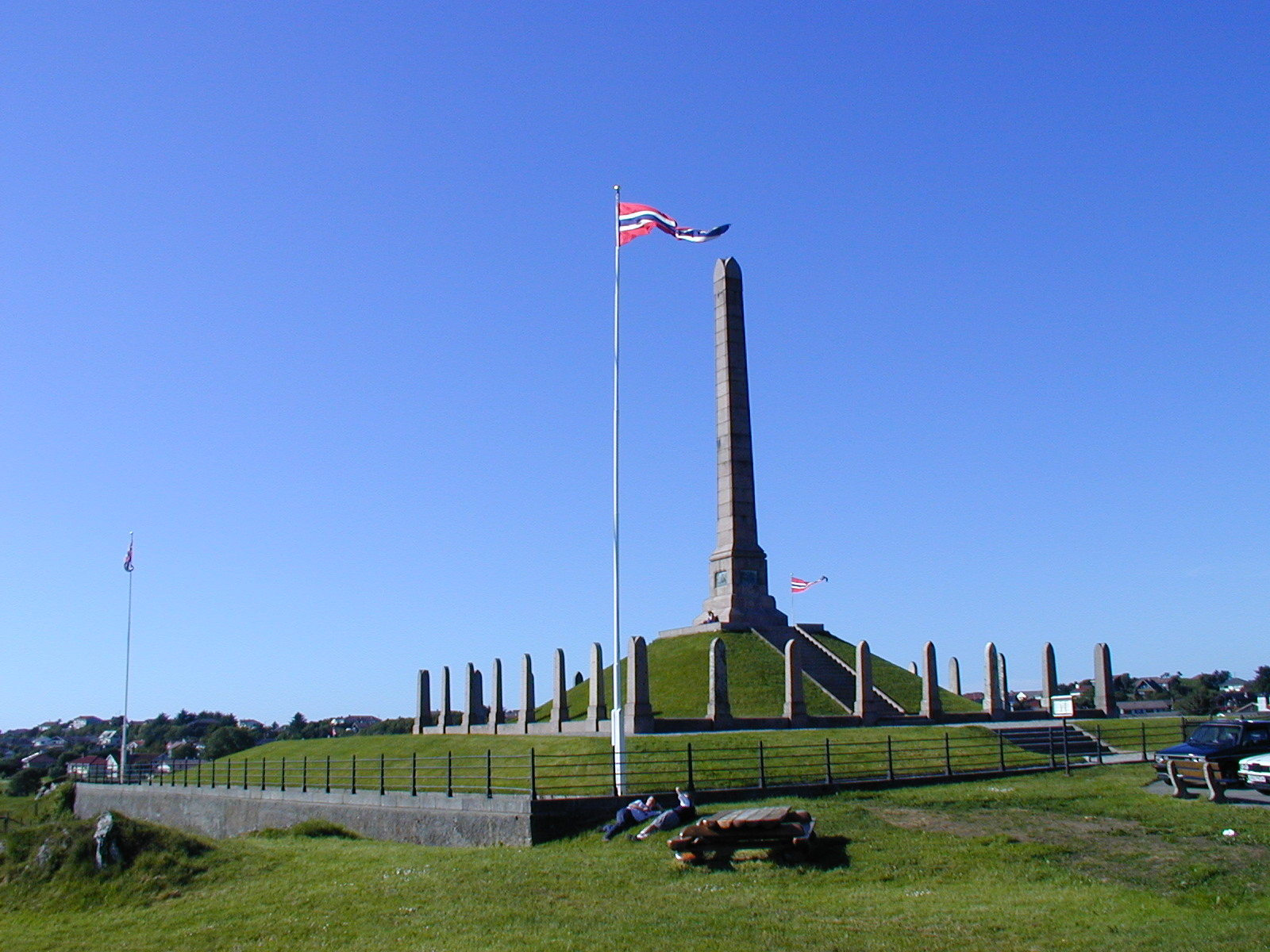
Haraldshaugen, a national monument erected in 1872; traditionally associated with the burial site of Harald Fairhair.

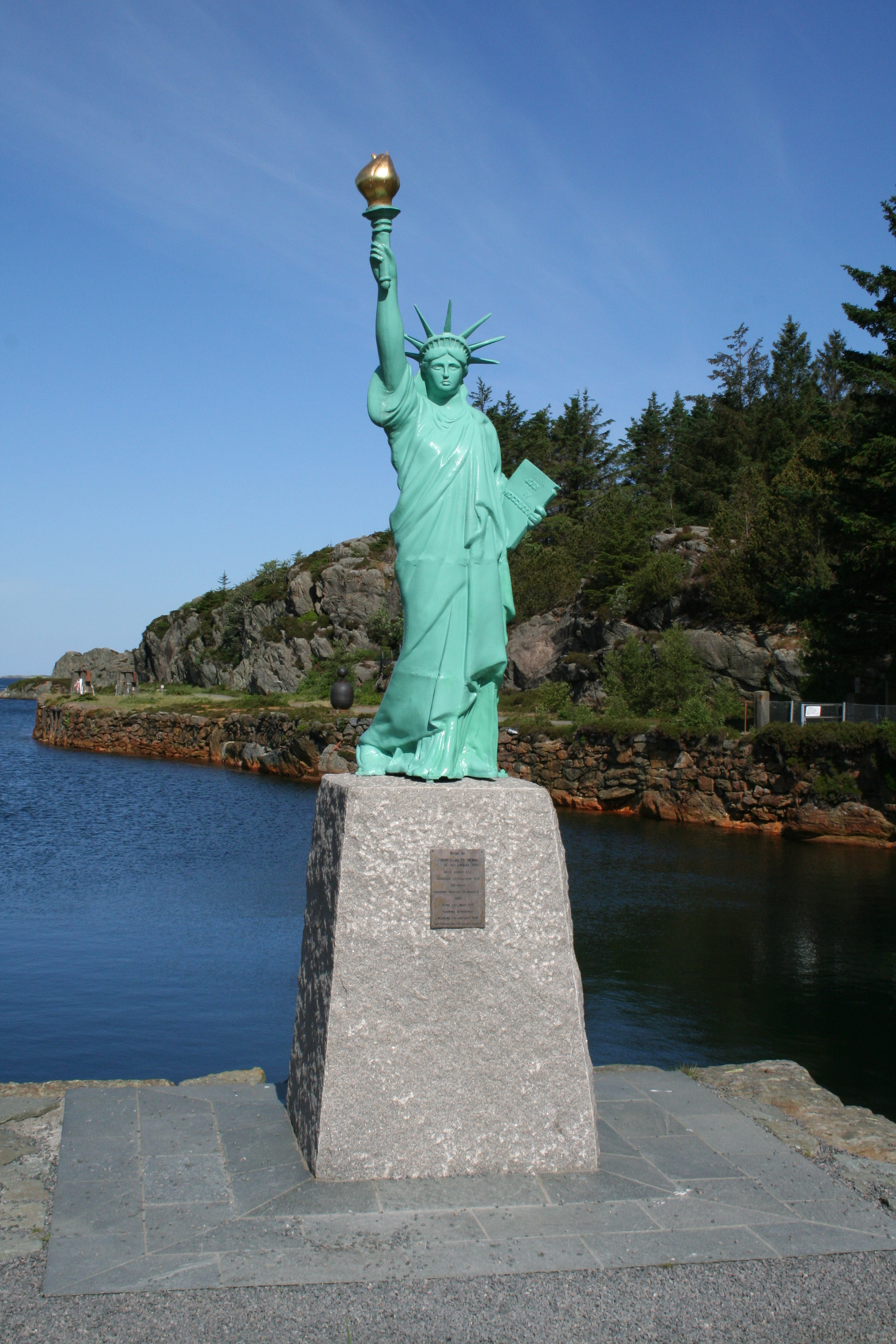
The copper for the Statue of Liberty came from Vigsnes Copper Works; a local miniature replica is located in Visnes.

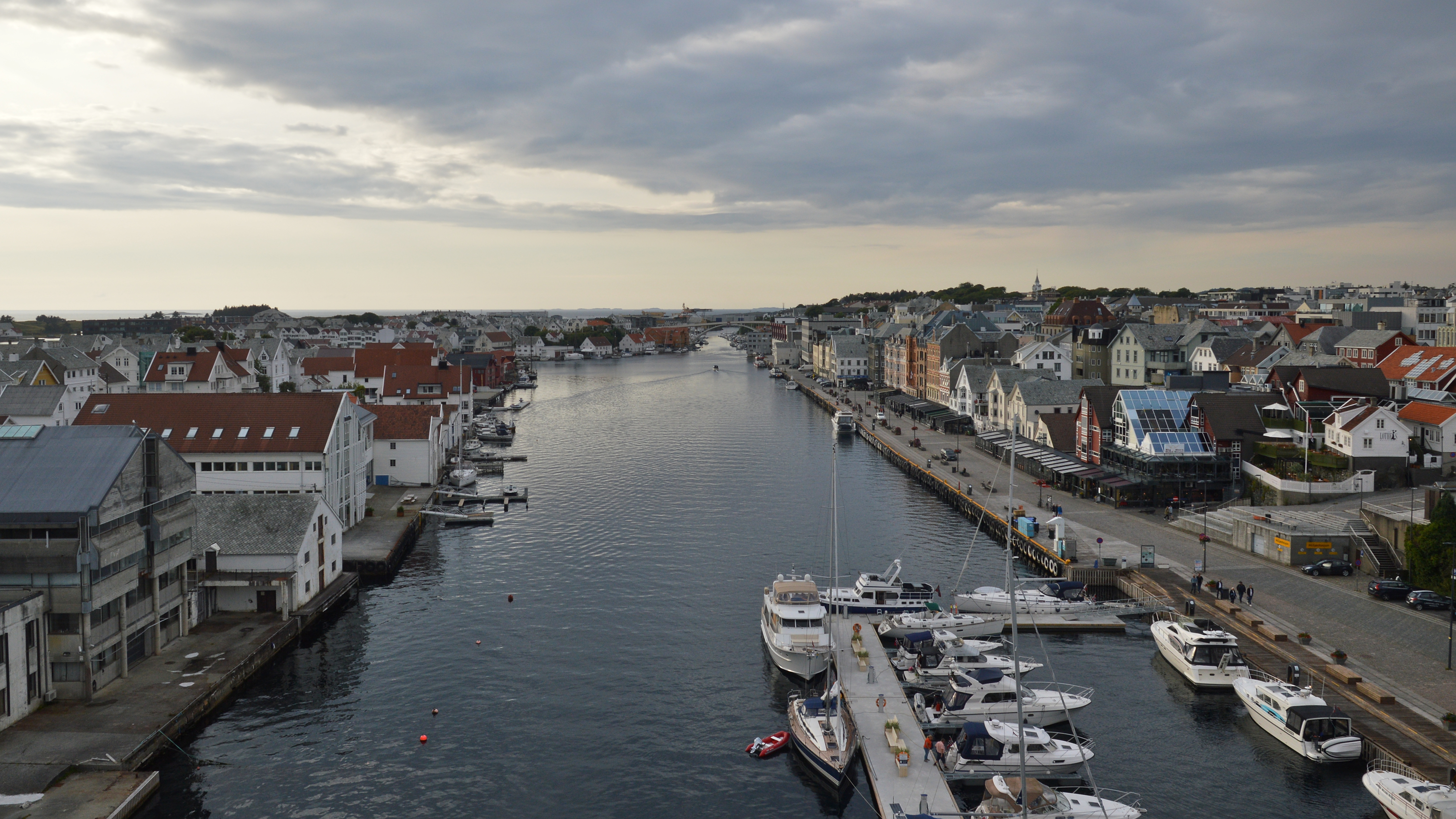
Haugesund, the largest town and regional centre of the Haugaland.

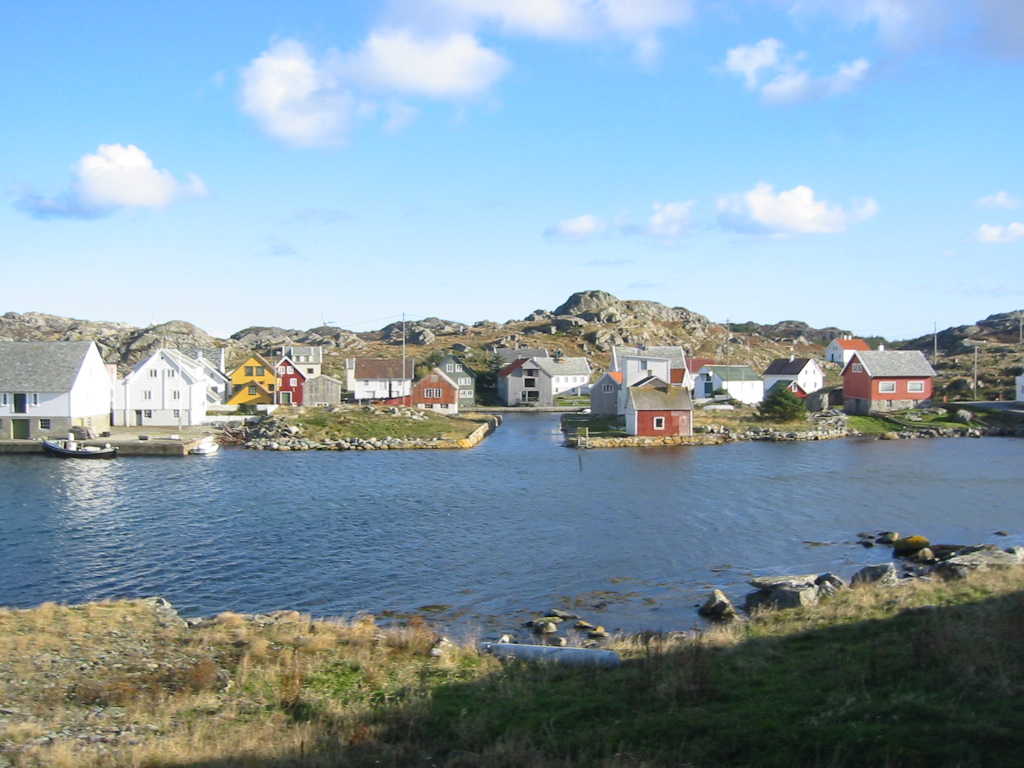
Utsira, Norway's smallest municipality by population.

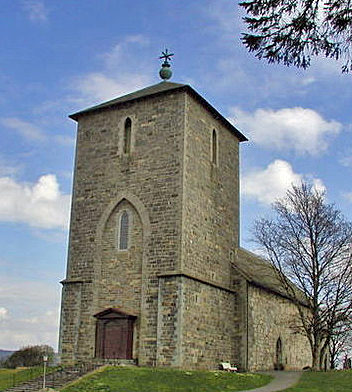
Avaldsnes Church, a medieval church located at the historic Avaldsnes Kongsgård estate.

== Other sources ==
- Falkeid, Kolbein (1999). Haugalandet: Ferd i folk og natur. Wigestrand Forlag.
- Helle, Knut (2006). Vestlandets historie. Bergen: Vigmostad & Bjørke. ISBN 9788241904004.
