= Kopervik =

Town in Rogaland, Norway

- Town/City
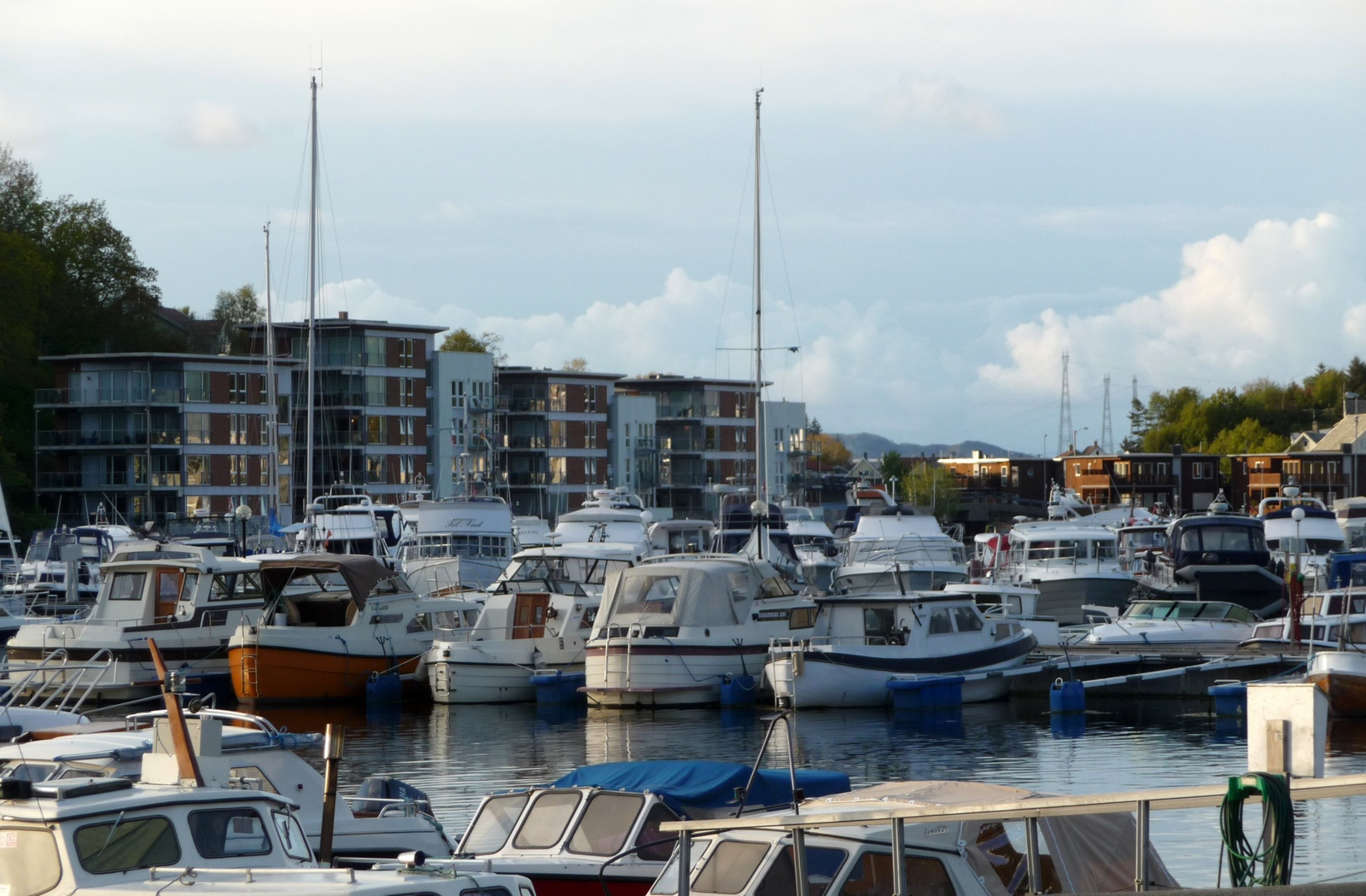
- Stølebukten (2010)
- Interactive map of Kopervik
- Coordinates: 59.28354°N 5.30671°E
- Country: Norway
- Region: Western Norway
- County: Rogaland
- District: Haugaland
- Municipality: Karmøy Municipality
- Established as
- Ladested: 1866–1964
- By (town): 1996

Area
  - Total: 7.82 km^{2} (3.02 sq mi)
- Elevation: 2 m (6.6 ft)

Population (2025)
  - Total: 12,006
  - Density: 1,535/km^{2} (3,980/sq mi)
- Demonym: Koperviksbu
- Time zone: UTC+01:00 (CET)
  - Summer (DST): UTC+02:00 (CEST)
- Post Code: 4250 Kopervik
- Former municipality
- Kopervik ladested
- Rogaland within Norway

- Kopervik within Rogaland
- Country: Norway
- County: Rogaland
- District: Haugaland
- Established: 16 Aug 1866
  - Preceded by: Avaldsnes Municipality
- Disestablished: 1 Jan 1965
  - Succeeded by: Karmøy Municipality
- Administrative centre: Kopervik

Government
  - Mayor (1964–1964): Axel Holst Roness

Area (upon dissolution)
  - Total: 0.44 km^{2} (0.17 sq mi)
  - Rank: #523 in Norway

Population (1964)
  - Total: 1,771
  - Rank: #421 in Norway
  - Density: 4,025/km^{2} (10,420/sq mi)
  - Change (10 years): ▲ +0.1%
- Demonym: Koperviksbu

Official language
  - Norwegian form: Neutral
- Time zone: UTC+01:00 (CET)
  - Summer (DST): UTC+02:00 (CEST)
- ISO 3166 code: NO-1105

Kopervik is the largest town on the island of Karmøy in Rogaland county, Norway. It is the administrative centre of Karmøy Municipality. It is part of the traditional district of Haugaland and the Haugesund Region, a statistical metropolitan area. The town was an independent municipality from 1866 to 1964.

The 7.82-square-kilometre (1,930-acre) town has a population (2025) of 12,006 and a population density of 1,535 inhabitants per square kilometre (3,980/sq mi). The municipality of Karmøy has 43,918 inhabitants, 27.3% live in Kopervik.

Kopervik is one of three towns in Karmøy Municipality (the others are Åkrehamn and Skudeneshavn). Kopervik is a transportation hub for scheduled boats going north to Bergen and south to Stavanger. The main industries are aluminium smelting and fishing. Kopervik contains Karmøy Municipality's municipal government buildings as well as a lot of the commercial development in the municipality.

== History ==
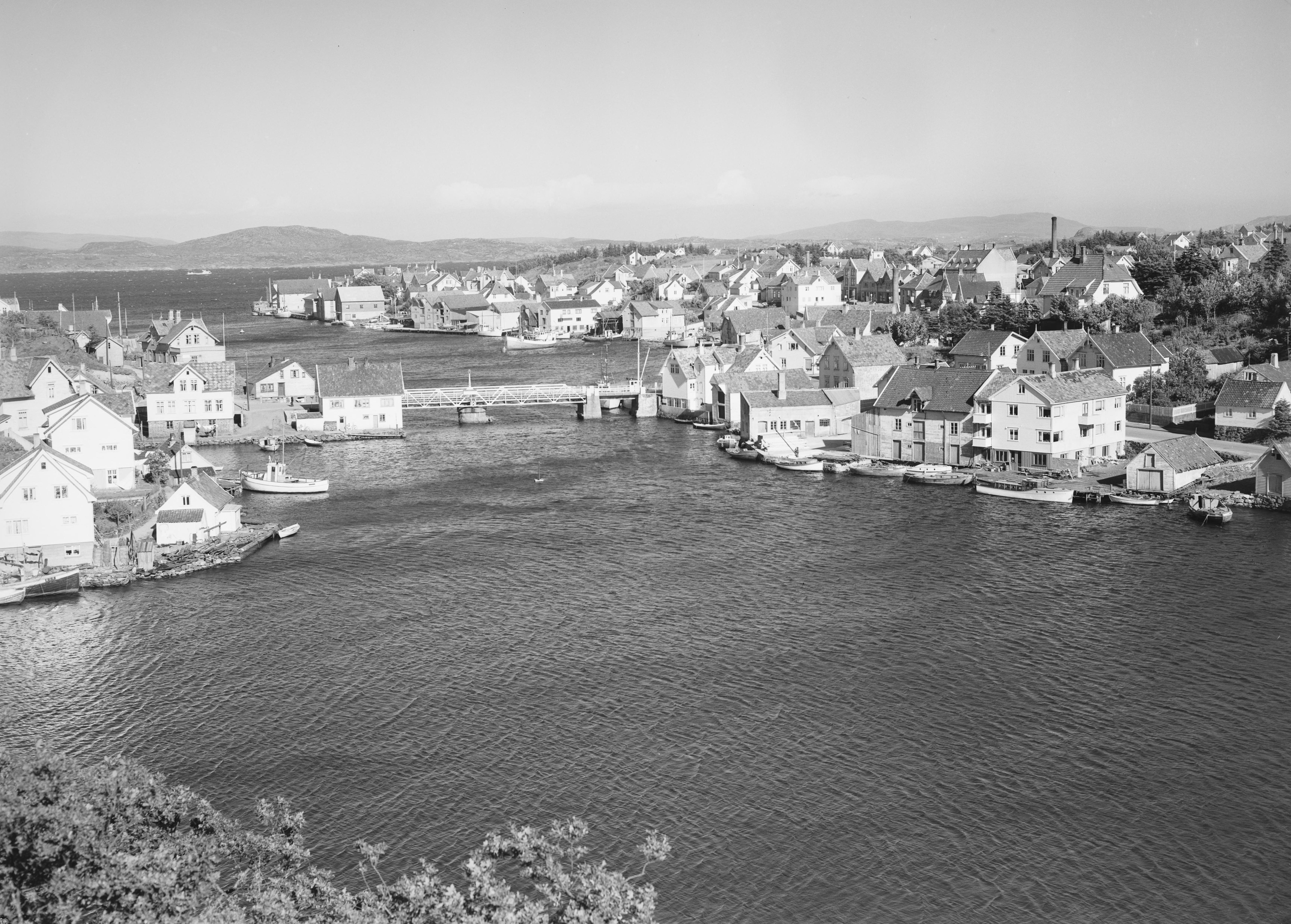
View of the town (before 1951).

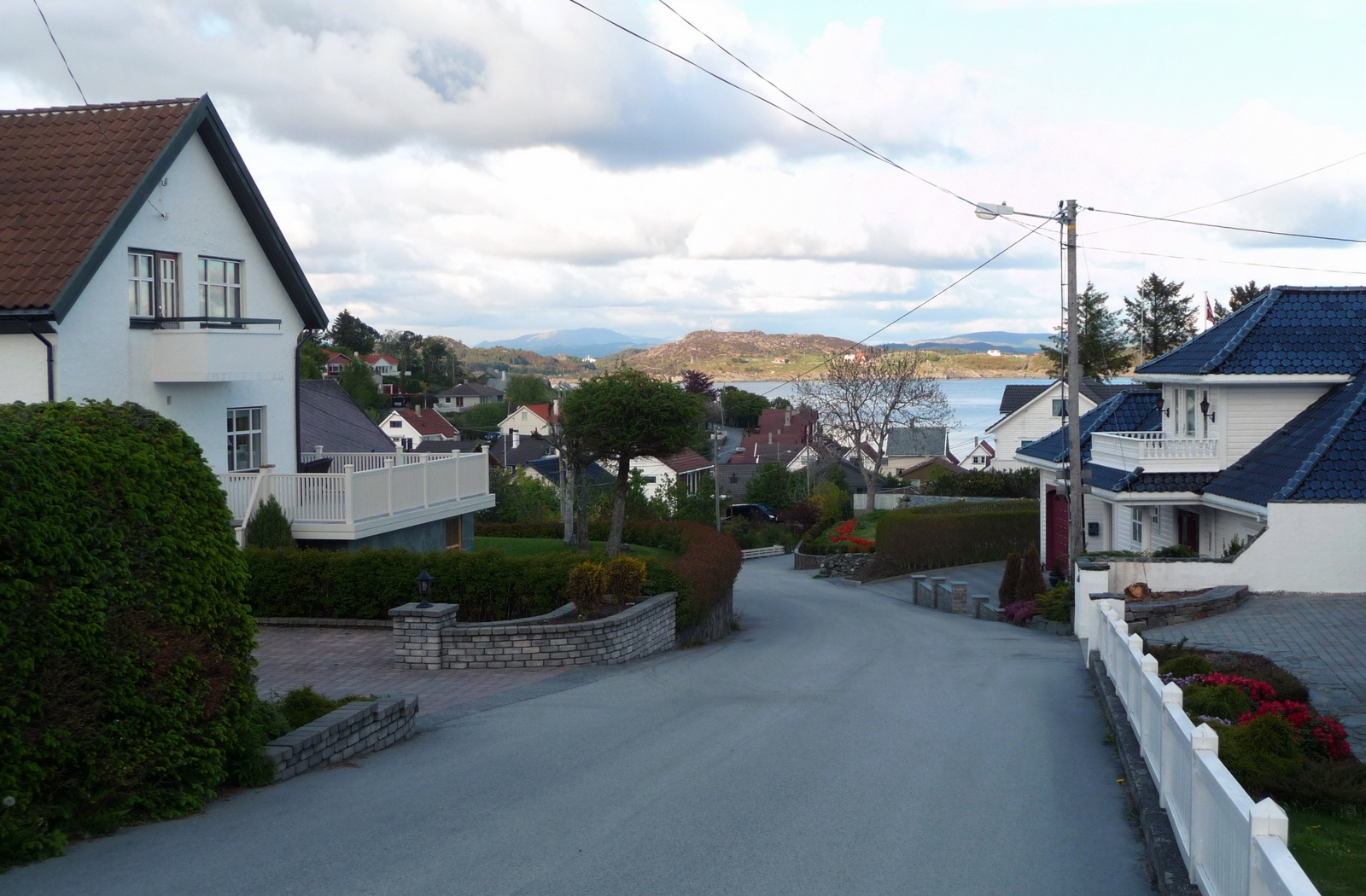
A neighborhood in Kopervik.

The village of Kopervik was declared a ladested (town) on 16 August 1866, and since towns could not be part of a rural municipality, it was separated from the large Avaldsnes Municipality to form a small urban municipality of its own. Initially, Kopervik had a population of 737 and it encompassed about 44 hectares (110 acres).

On 1 January 1965, there were many big municipal mergers in Norway due to the work of the Schei Committee, and on that date the town of Kopervik was merged with the neighboring municipalities of Avaldsnes, Stangaland, Torvastad, Skudenes, and Åkra plus the nearby town of Skudeneshavn. Together these municipalities formed the new, large Karmøy Municipality. Prior to the merger, Kopervik Municipality had 1,737 residents. Kopervik lost its status as a "town" upon merging into Karmøy Municipality. In 1996, due to some changes in the laws on towns, Karmøy Municipality declared Kopervik to be a town once again.

Kopervik Church has been located in the town for a long time. The previous church building was destroyed by fire in 2010, and its replacement was completed in 2016. The original church was built in 1861 by the architect Jacob Wilhelm Nordan.

According to legend, King Sverre I of Norway ordered the construction of a wooden castle on the headland at the entrance to the harbour where Kopervik is located today. A part of Kopervik is therefore called Treborg, literally meaning "wooden castle". There is however no evidence of its existence. Kopervik was also home to Tormod Torfæus, appointed as the official Royal Norwegian historian to the Danish king during the Kingdom of Denmark-Norway.

=== Name ===
The town was named Kopervik in 1866 when it was established as a ladested. The name has an uncertain meaning, but the Old Norse form of the name may have been Koparvík. The first element is possibly named after a very small, nearby skerry, Koparnaglen, which was originally named Kobbanaglen. That name likely comes from the word kobbi which means "seal". The last element is vík which means "inlet" or "bay".

== Municipal self-government (1866–1964) ==
From 1866 through 1964, Kopervik was an independent municipality. While it existed, Kopervik Municipality was responsible for primary education (through 10th grade), outpatient health services, senior citizen services, welfare and other social services, zoning, economic development, and municipal roads and utilities. The municipality was governed by a municipal council of directly elected representatives. The mayor was indirectly elected by a vote of the municipal council. The municipality was under the jurisdiction of the Karmsund District Court and the Gulating Court of Appeal.

=== Municipal council ===
The municipal council (Bystyre) of Kopervik Municipality was made up of 21 representatives that were elected to four year terms. The tables below show the historical composition of the council by political party.

Kopervik bystyre 1959–1963
Party name (in Norwegian)	Number of representatives
Labour Party (Arbeiderpartiet)	9
Conservative Party (Høyre)	5
Christian Democratic Party (Kristelig Folkeparti)	3
Liberal Party (Venstre)	4
Total number of members:	21

Kopervik bystyre 1955–1959
Party name (in Norwegian)	Number of representatives
Labour Party (Arbeiderpartiet)	9
Conservative Party (Høyre)	5
Christian Democratic Party (Kristelig Folkeparti)	4
Liberal Party (Venstre)	3
Total number of members:	21

Kopervik bystyre 1951–1955
Party name (in Norwegian)	Number of representatives
Labour Party (Arbeiderpartiet)	9
Conservative Party (Høyre)	4
Christian Democratic Party (Kristelig Folkeparti)	4
Liberal Party (Venstre)	3
Total number of members:	20

Kopervik bystyre 1947–1951
Party name (in Norwegian)	Number of representatives
Labour Party (Arbeiderpartiet)	7
Conservative Party (Høyre)	4
Christian Democratic Party (Kristelig Folkeparti)	3
Joint list of the Liberal Party (Venstre) and the Radical People's Party (Radikale Folkepartiet)	5
Local List(s) (Lokale lister)	1
Total number of members:	20

Kopervik bystyre 1945–1947
Party name (in Norwegian)	Number of representatives
Labour Party (Arbeiderpartiet)	8
Conservative Party (Høyre)	1
Communist Party (Kommunistiske Parti)	4
Joint list of the Liberal Party (Venstre) and the Radical People's Party (Radikale Folkepartiet)	4
Local List(s) (Lokale lister)	3
Total number of members:	20

Kopervik bystyre 1937–1941*
Party name (in Norwegian)	Number of representatives
Labour Party (Arbeiderpartiet)	6
Liberal Party (Venstre)	7
Joint list of the Conservative Party (Høyre) and the Free-minded People's Party (Frisinnede Folkeparti)	5
Local List(s) (Lokale lister)	2
Total number of members:	20
Note: Due to the German occupation of Norway during World War II, no elections were held for new municipal councils until after the war ended in 1945.

Kopervik bystyre 1935–1937
Party name (in Norwegian)	Number of representatives
Labour Party (Arbeiderpartiet)	6
Liberal Party (Venstre)	8
Joint list of the Conservative Party (Høyre) and the Free-minded People's Party (Frisinnede Folkeparti)	5
Local List(s) (Lokale lister)	1
Total number of members:	20

=== Mayors ===
The mayor (Bokmål: ordfører) of Kopervik Municipality was the political leader of the municipality and the chairperson of the municipal council. The following people have held this position:

- 1866–1870: Claudius Schiwe
- 1870–1875: A.J. Olsen
- 1876–1876: L.B. Henriksen
- 1877–1884: Adolf Hagbarth Marius Lunde
- 1885–1892: Aasmund Vinje
- 1893–1901: Rasmus Østbø
- 1902–1904: Reinhold Maartmann
- 1905–1905: Ole Waage
- 1906–1907: Tobias Telaus Ariansen
- 1908–1913: Carl Lundberg
- 1914–1916: Andreas Tomasgaard
- 1917–1917: Kristian Lundberg
- 1918–1918: Andreas Tomasgaard
- 1919–1919: Carl Lundberg
- 1920–1922: Thomas Idsøe
- 1923–1923: Carl Lundberg
- 1924–1924: Ketil Arneson Skeie
- 1925–1926: Carl Lundberg
- 1927–1927: Andreas Tomasgaard
- 1928–1931: Carl Lundberg
- 1932–1932: Leif Holmbek
- 1932–1934: Anton Salomonsen
- 1935–1938: Elias Sandvig
- 1939–1939: Nils O. Fjeldkårsta
- 1940–1941: Elias Sandvig
- 1946–1947: Magnus Børresen
- 1948–1948: Elias Sandvig
- 1949–1949: Magnus Børresen
- 1950–1950: Elias Sandvig
- 1950–1953: Lauritz Wathne
- 1954–1955: Magnus Børresen
- 1956–1957: Johan Fritzner Thorkildsen
- 1958–1959: Magnus Børresen
- 1960–1963: Frimann Skeie
- 1964–1964: Axel Holst Roness

== Notable people ==
- Jan Kjell Larsen (born 1983), a footballer
- Svein Munkejord (born 1948), a former fisheries minister
- Asbjørn Sunde (1909–1985), a saboteur against the Nazi occupation of Norway
- Tormod Torfæus (1636–1719), an Icelandic-Norwegian historian
- Øyvind Vaksdal (born 1955), former member of the Norwegian Parliament
- Karina Sævik (born 1996), a footballer
