= Åkrehamn =

Town in Rogaland, Norway

Åkrehamn Åkrahamn (unofficial) Åkra (unofficial)
- Town/City
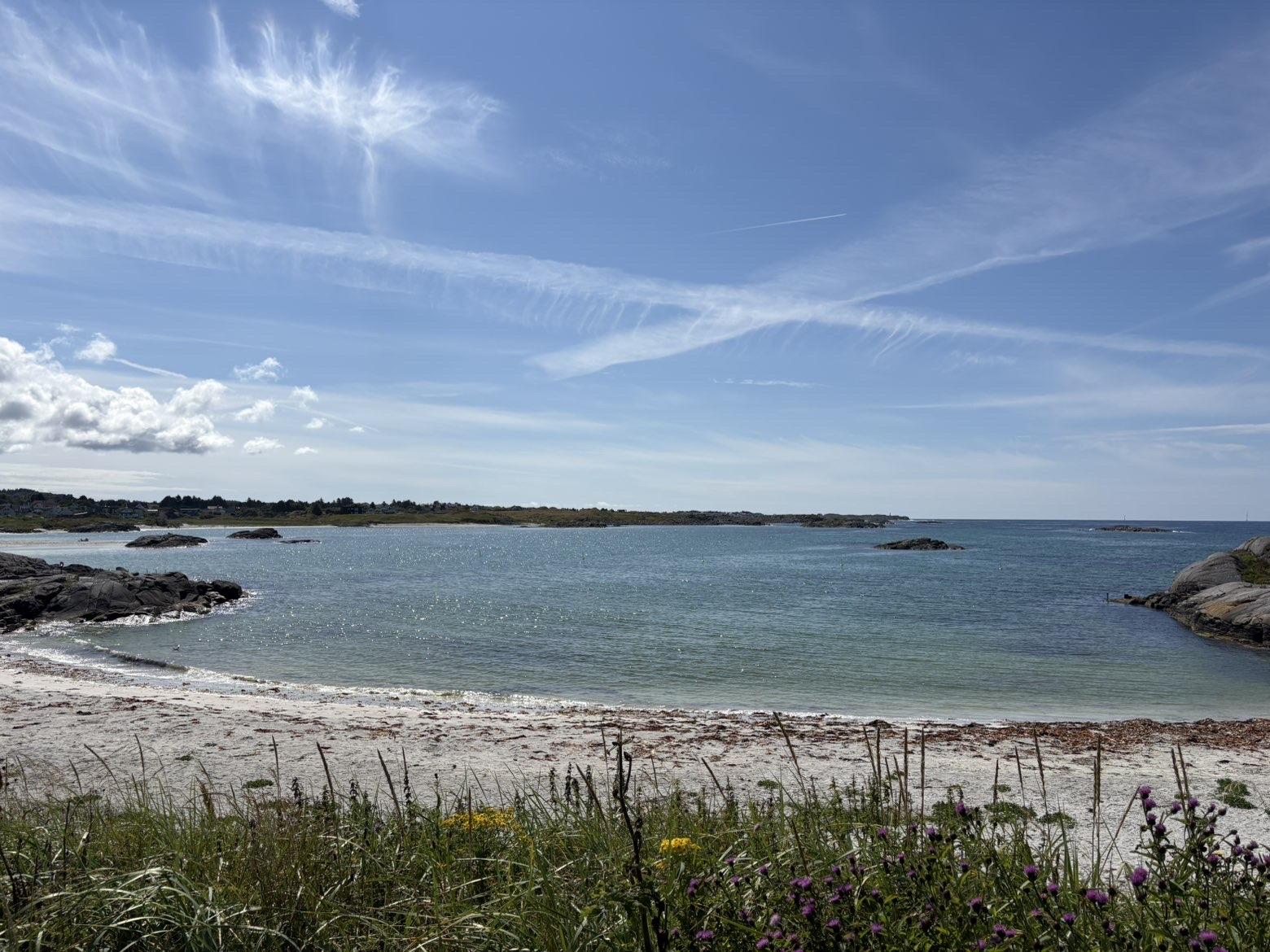
- View of Åkrasanden
- Interactive map of Åkrehamn
- Coordinates: 59.2585°N 5.1820°E
- Country: Norway
- Region: Western Norway
- County: Rogaland
- District: Haugaland
- Municipality: Karmøy Municipality
- Established as
- Town (By): 2002

Area
  - Total: 4.37 km^{2} (1.69 sq mi)
- Elevation: 7 m (23 ft)

Population (2025)
  - Total: 8,202
  - Density: 1,877/km^{2} (4,860/sq mi)
- Demonym: Åkrabu
- Time zone: UTC+01:00 (CET)
  - Summer (DST): UTC+02:00 (CEST)
- Post Code: 4270 Åkrehamn

Åkrehamn (commonly known as simply Åkra) is a small town in Karmøy Municipality in Rogaland county, Norway. The town is located on the west side of the island of Karmøy in the traditional district of Haugaland and the Haugesund Region, a statistical metropolitan area. The town sits about 5 kilometres (3.1 mi) west of the town of Kopervik, about 12 kilometres (7.5 mi) north of the town of Skudeneshavn, and about 25 kilometres (16 mi) southwest of the town of Haugesund. The village of Veavågen lies immediately to the northeast of Åkrehamn (and it is considered part of the urban area of Åkrehamn).

The 4.37-square-kilometre (1,080-acre) town has a population (2025) of 8,202 and a population density of 1,877 inhabitants per square kilometre (4,860/sq mi). The village of Åkrehamn gained town status in 2002. Since it declared town status, Åkrehamn has blossomed and is now the second largest town in Karmøy Municipality, after the nearby town of Kopervik. The good economy of Norway has brought capital and investments to Åkrehamn, and in the last couple of years, the town has been expanded. Apartments and houses have been built and new fields of industry introduced.

The northern part of Åkrehamn now encompasses the old fishing village of Sævelandsvik. It is centered on the protected harbor area called Mannes. The economy of this area is centered on fishing and some other small industries.

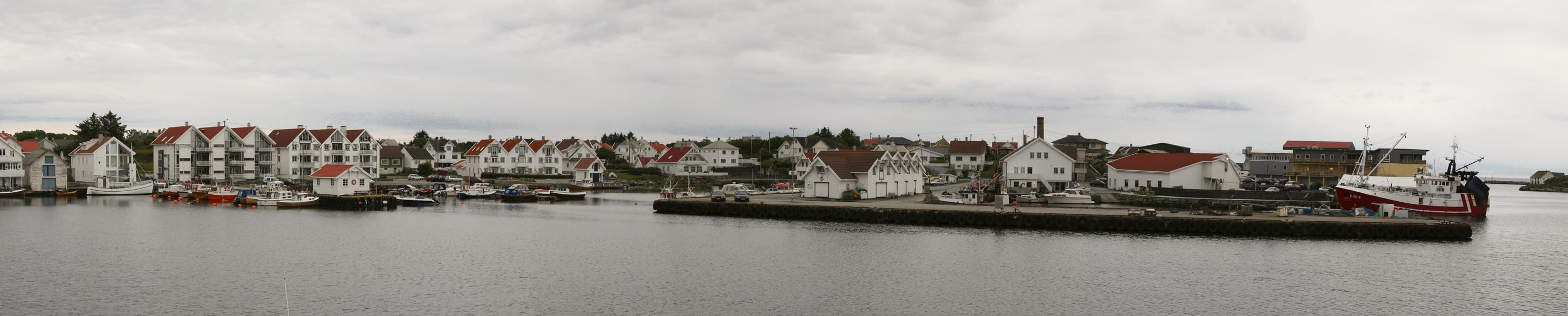
View of the Åkrehamn docks

== See also ==
- List of towns and cities in Norway
