= Skudeneshavn =

Town in Rogaland, Norway

Skudeneshavn Skudeneshamn (unofficial)
- Town/City
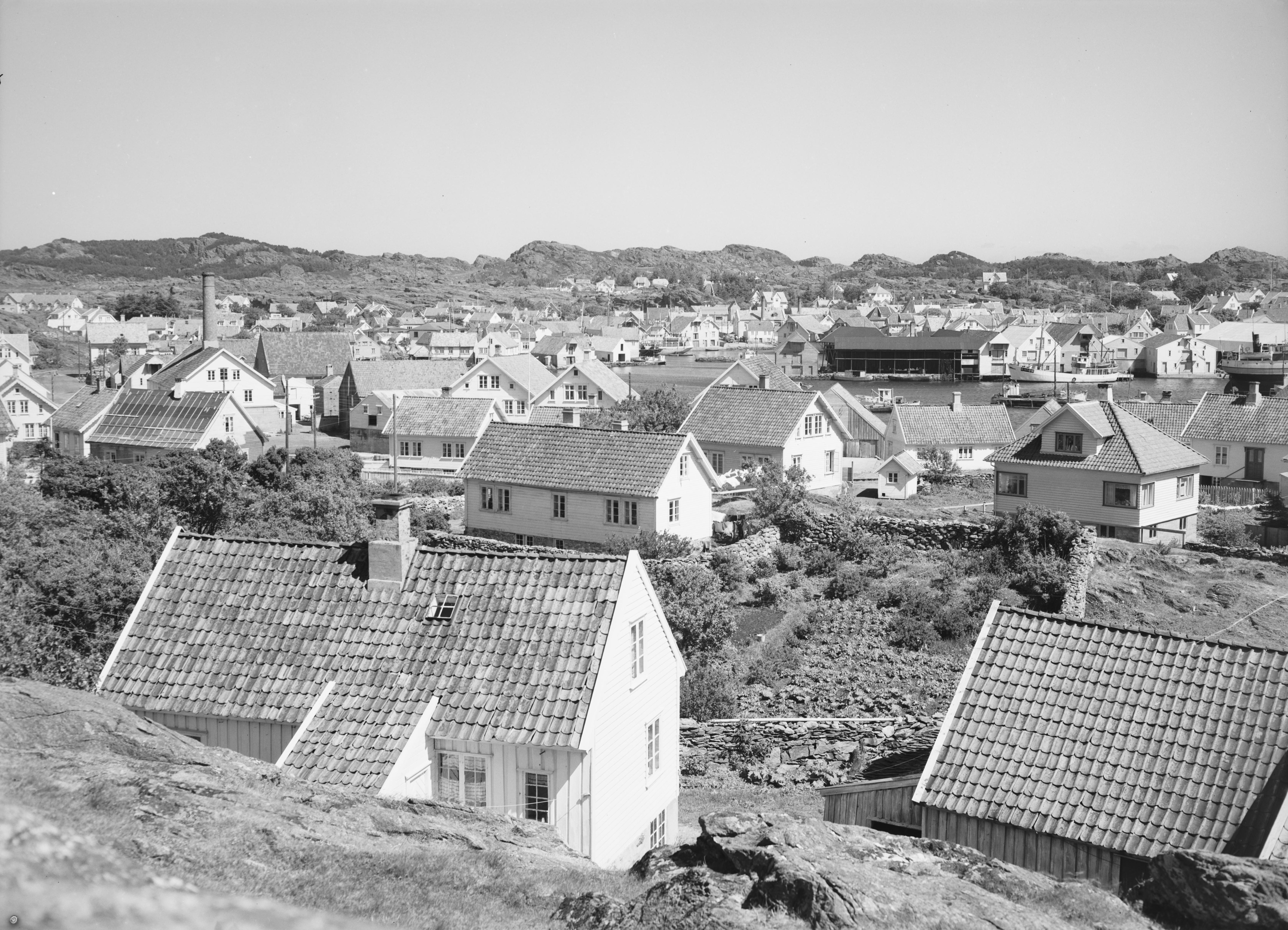
- Skudeneshavn in July 1951
- Interactive map of Skudeneshavn
- Coordinates: 59.1501°N 5.2566°E
- Country: Norway
- Region: Western Norway
- County: Rogaland
- District: Haugaland
- Municipality: Karmøy Municipality
- Established as
- Ladested: 10 Feb 1858

Area
  - Total: 2.55 km^{2} (0.98 sq mi)
- Elevation: 3 m (9.8 ft)

Population (2025)
  - Total: 3,360
  - Density: 1,318/km^{2} (3,410/sq mi)
- Demonym(s): Skudnesbu, Skudenesbu
- Time zone: UTC+01:00 (CET)
  - Summer (DST): UTC+02:00 (CEST)
- Post Code: 4280 Skudeneshavn
- Former municipality
- Skudeneshavn ladested
- Rogaland within Norway

- Skudeneshavn within Rogaland
- Country: Norway
- County: Rogaland
- District: Haugaland
- Established: 10 Feb 1858
  - Preceded by: Skudenes Municipality
- Disestablished: 1 Jan 1965
  - Succeeded by: Karmøy Municipality
- Administrative centre: Skudeneshavn

Government
  - Mayor (1949–1964): Olav M. Wikre (Ap)

Area (upon dissolution)
  - Total: 0.51 km^{2} (0.20 sq mi)
  - Rank: #522 in Norway

Population (1964)
  - Total: 1,310
  - Rank: #466 in Norway
  - Density: 2,568.6/km^{2} (6,653/sq mi)
  - Change (10 years): ▼ −1.4%

Official language
  - Norwegian form: Neutral
- Time zone: UTC+01:00 (CET)
  - Summer (DST): UTC+02:00 (CEST)
- ISO 3166 code: NO-1104

Skudeneshavn (also known as simply Skudenes) is a town in Karmøy Municipality in Rogaland county, Norway. It is located on the southernmost tip of the island of Karmøy at the entrance to the Boknafjorden and Karmsundet strait. The town is part of the traditional district of Haugaland and the Haugesund Region, a statistical metropolitan area. The town was an independent municipality due to its status as a ladested from 1858 until 1965.

The 2.55-square-kilometre (630-acre) town has a population (2025) of 3,360 and a population density of 1,318 inhabitants per square kilometre (3,410/sq mi). In 1990, Skudeneshavn won second prize in NORTRA's competition for Norway's Best Preserved Small Town.

== History ==
The village of Skudeneshavn was declared to be a ladested (port town) on 10 February 1858. Since towns were not allowed to be part of a rural municipality, Skudeneshavn was removed from Skudenes Municipality, and established as its own urban municipality. Initially, Skudeneshavn Municipality had 1,209 residents. During the 1960s, there were many municipal mergers across Norway due to the work of the Schei Committee. On 1 January 1965, the town-municipality of Skudeneshavn was merged into the newly formed Karmøy Municipality (along with Skudenes Municipality, Avaldsnes Municipality, Stangaland Municipality, Torvastad Municipality and the town of Kopervik). Prior to the merger, Skudeneshavn Municipality had 1,275 residents. At the time of the merger, Skudeneshavn lost its status as a town (ladested). In 1996, after the law on towns had been changed, Karmøy Municipality declared Skudeneshavn to be a town once again.

=== Name ===
The town (originally the municipality and parish) is named after the Skudenes peninsula (Old Norse: Skútunes) at the south end of the island of Karmøy. The first element is the genitive case of skúta which means "rock wall that is sticking out", referring to the rocky islets and skerries that lie just off the shore of the peninsula. The second element is nes which means "headland". The last element is havn which means "harbor" or "port".

== Municipal self-government (1858-1964) ==
From 1858 through 1964, Skudeneshavn was a self-governing municipality. While it existed, Skudeneshavn Municipality was responsible for primary education (through 10th grade), outpatient health services, senior citizen services, welfare and other social services, zoning, economic development, and municipal roads and utilities. The municipality was governed by a municipal council of directly elected representatives. The mayor was indirectly elected by a vote of the municipal council. The municipality was under the jurisdiction of the Karmsund District Court and the Gulating Court of Appeal.

=== Municipal council ===
The municipal council (Bystyre) of Skudeneshavn Municipality was made up of 21 representatives that were elected to four year terms. The tables below show the historical composition of the council by political party.

Skudeneshavn bystyre 1963–1964
Party name (in Norwegian)	Number of representatives
Labour Party (Arbeiderpartiet)	9
Conservative Party (Høyre)	3
Christian Democratic Party (Kristelig Folkeparti)	2
Liberal Party (Venstre)	7
Total number of members:	21

Skudeneshavn bystyre 1959–1963
Party name (in Norwegian)	Number of representatives
Labour Party (Arbeiderpartiet)	9
Conservative Party (Høyre)	3
Christian Democratic Party (Kristelig Folkeparti)	2
Liberal Party (Venstre)	7
Total number of members:	21

Skudeneshavn bystyre 1955–1959
Party name (in Norwegian)	Number of representatives
Labour Party (Arbeiderpartiet)	9
Conservative Party (Høyre)	3
Christian Democratic Party (Kristelig Folkeparti)	2
Liberal Party (Venstre)	7
Total number of members:	21

Skudeneshavn bystyre 1951–1955
Party name (in Norwegian)	Number of representatives
Labour Party (Arbeiderpartiet)	9
Conservative Party (Høyre)	3
Christian Democratic Party (Kristelig Folkeparti)	2
Liberal Party (Venstre)	6
Total number of members:	20

Skudeneshavn bystyre 1947–1951
Party name (in Norwegian)	Number of representatives
Labour Party (Arbeiderpartiet)	8
Conservative Party (Høyre)	3
Joint list of the Liberal Party (Venstre) and the Radical People's Party (Radikale Folkepartiet)	9
Total number of members:	20

Skudeneshavn bystyre 1945–1947
Party name (in Norwegian)	Number of representatives
Labour Party (Arbeiderpartiet)	11
Joint list of the Liberal Party (Venstre) and the Radical People's Party (Radikale Folkepartiet)	7
Local List(s) (Lokale lister)	2
Total number of members:	20

Skudeneshavn bystyre 1937–1941*
Party name (in Norwegian)	Number of representatives
Labour Party (Arbeiderpartiet)	6
Joint List(s) of Non-Socialist Parties (Borgerlige Felleslister)	14
Total number of members:	20
Note: Due to the German occupation of Norway during World War II, no elections were held for new municipal councils until after the war ended in 1945.

Skudeneshavn bystyre 1935–1937
Party name (in Norwegian)	Number of representatives
Labour Party (Arbeiderpartiet)	7
Liberal Party (Venstre)	8
Joint List(s) of Non-Socialist Parties (Borgerlige Felleslister)	5
Total number of members:	20

=== Mayors ===
The mayor (Bokmål: ordfører) of Skudeneshavn Municipality was the political leader of the municipality and the chairperson of the municipal council. The following people have held this position:

- 1858–1859: Michael Smith
- 1859–1861: Lars Riisdahl
- 1861–1869: A.M. Andersen
- 1869–1870: E. Gjessen
- 1870–1880: E.O. Kjeldsen
- 1880–1884: S. Waage
- 1884–1893: Rasmus Larsen
- 1893–1899: Lars L. Riisdahl
- 1899–1903: O.G. Gjessen
- 1903–1905: O.C. Hansen
- 1905–1908: Hans Sannæs
- 1908–1918: O.C. Hansen
- 1918–1924: Oskar Kjeldsen
- 1924–1926: J. Hellesland
- 1926–1934: Hans Hillesland
- 1934–1937: Hans Gilje
- 1937–1941: Hans Hillesland
- 1941–1942: Ove Gilje
- 1942–1945: Olav Åsen
- 1945–1945: Hans Hillesland
- 1946–1947: Olav M. Wikre (Ap)
- 1947–1949: Alf Midtbø
- 1949–1964: Olav M. Wikre (Ap)

== Attractions ==
Skudeneshavn's old town (Gamle Skudeneshavn), consisting of 225 wooden houses/boathouses, is regarded as one of the best preserved in Europe. In 2004, it was voted Norway's "Summer Town" by listeners to NRK Radio's Reiseradioen programme.

Each year the "Skudeneshavn International Literature and Culture festival" (Norwegian: Skudeneshavn Internasjonale Litteratur- og Kulturfestival) (SILK festival) is held on the first weekend of November.

=== Skudefestival ===
Every year, Skudeneshavn hosts a "boating" festival known as Skudefestivalen. It usually runs for four days (from Thursday to Sunday) at the end of June or beginning of July (it is a 'moveable' date). The festival is the largest gathering of coastal culture in Western Norway, with boats of all categories - old wooden boats, vintage boats, modern boats, sailing boats, tall ships - the town is full of life around the harbour - both on land and on water. Markets stalls are set up in the Town Square. Craftsmen demonstrate handcrafts from olden days connected to sea and shipping. Boat builders, ship models, old engines. An art exhibition in Søragadå - the main and narrow street in "Old Skudeneshavn" is held with a new festival artist chosen every year. Visitors can see the exhibitions in "Bytunet" in the old part of town. Entertainment is provided in the daytime - and in the evenings in the festival tent featuring national and international artists and in the many sea houses Celtic music, blues and middle-of the road pop. Travelling amusement rides and arcades usually time their visits to coincide with this popular festival, providing extra enjoyment for younger children and teenagers. Every year about 35,000 people visit the festival and it gathers more than 600 boats. The festival in 2017 was between 29 June - 2 July and is the 24th festival. The festival in 2018 is between 5 and 8 July.

== See also ==
- List of former municipalities of Norway
