= Christen Bentsen Schaaning =

Norwegian clergyman

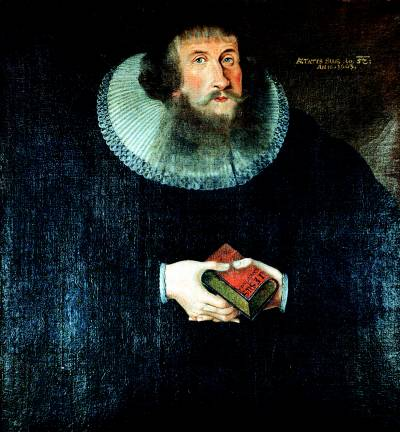
Christen Bentsen Schaaning by Scottish painter Andrew Smith (1663)

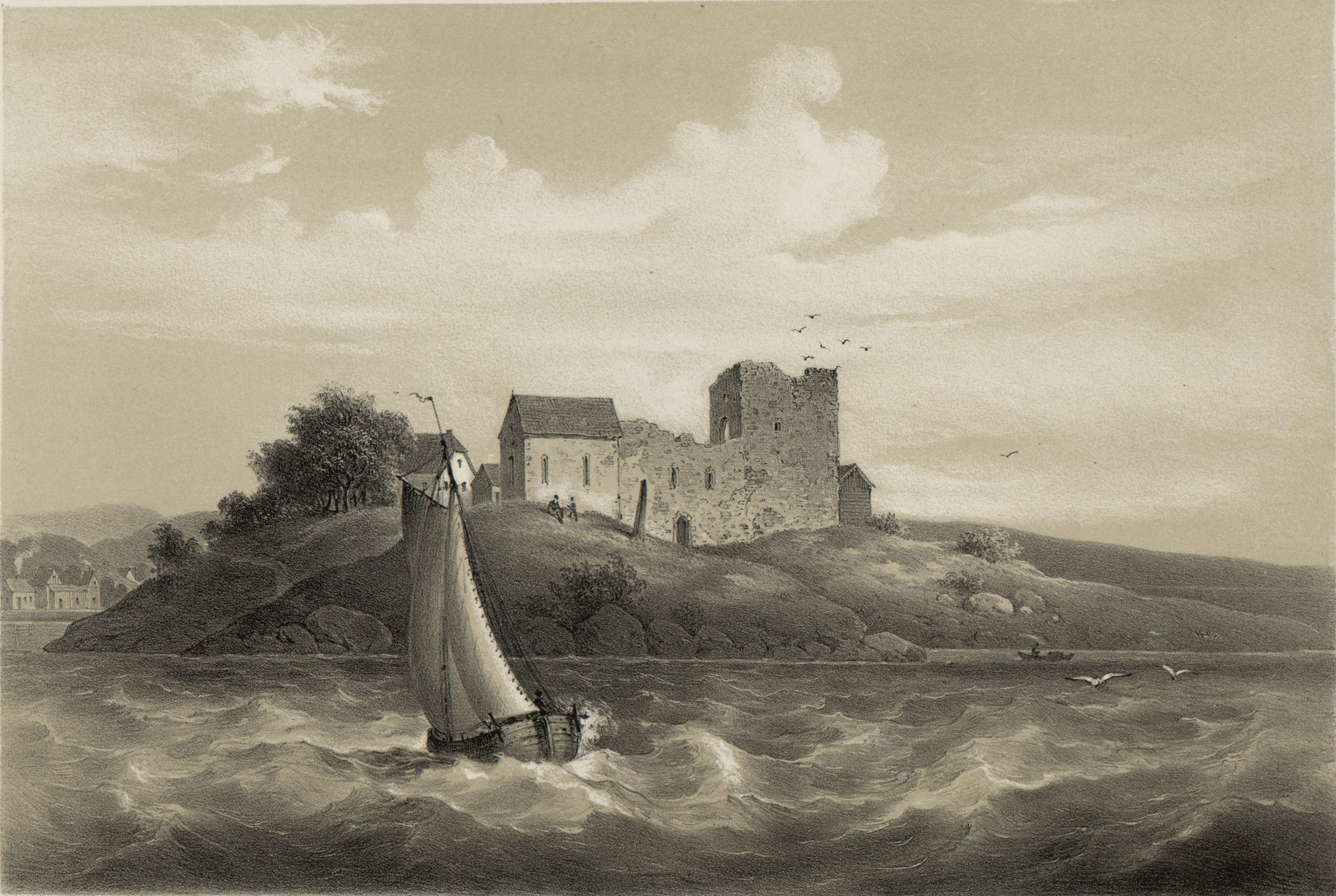
Avaldsnes kirke from "Norge fremstillet i Tegninger". Published by Christian Tønsberg (1848)

Christen Bentsen Schaaning (Kristen Bentsen Skaaning) (c. 1611-1679) was a Norwegian clergyman. He served as parish priest of Avaldsnes Church (Avaldsnes kirke) at Karmøy in Rogaland, Norway from 1635–1679.

== Biography ==
He was probably born in Scania which was at that time ruled by Denmark-Norway. On the 1 July 1630, Christirnus Benedicti Scanus was taken up as a student. Before he came to Avaldsnes, he was priest on a ship. Christen was reportedly a priest who earned the respect of the people, and he was present at many royal celebrations. One time, he asked the King of Denmark-Norway for funds to repair his church which had gone into decline. To add to his income, he got involved with herring-trade, even though it was outlawed.

== Personal life ==
He had a large family of 10 children who settled around different villages in Karmøy, resulting in many further descendants. He was married first to Mette Sørensdatter with whom he had eight sons.

In his second marriage, he was married to Kirsten Lauritsdatter of the noble Galtung family. She was a daughter of Lauritz Johannessen Galte and was a sister to noted admiral Lauritz Galtung. Christen's oldest son, Bernt, became a priest. He was for a time chaplain with his father. Bent was parish priest in Avaldsnes from 1671.

== Other sources ==
- Karmøy Skole - Prester etter reformasjonen (in Norwegian)
- Karmøyped - Barokk maleriet (in Norwegian)
- Christen Bentsen Schaaning (in Norwegian)
