= Stavanger Renaissance =

Cultural period in Stavanger, Norway

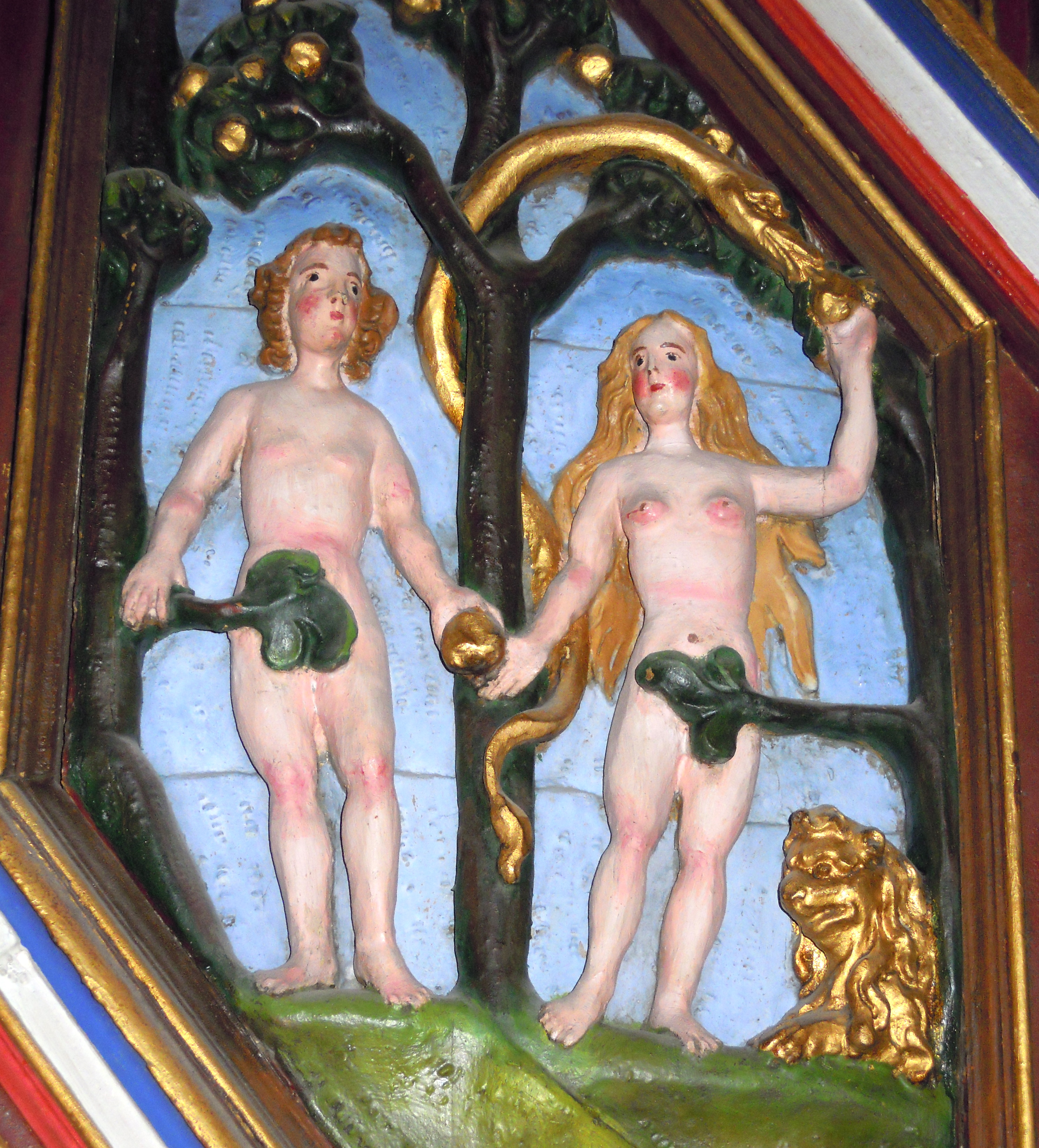
Adam and Eve in the Garden of Eden, Stavanger Cathedral, Norway

Stavanger Renaissance (Stavangerrenessansen) is the name for the cultural period which peaked in the middle of the 17th century in the vicinity of Stavanger, Norway. It was characterized principally by church art, largely decorated altarpieces, pulpits, baptismal fonts and wall surfaces.

The Stavanger Renaissance is an important period for Norwegian church art and décor. Art work from this period are found around the southwestern coast and throughout western Norway. Examples of churches representing by the art of the Stavanger Renaissance would include parish churches in Oddernes (1620), Årdal (ca. 1620), Røldal (1627-1629), Vestre Moland (1630) as well as Utstein Abbey (1625–1650).

== History ==
The Protestant Reformation from 1537 had not yet changed the art in the local churches. Much of the old Roman Catholic art was still present in the churches. Church authorities wanted to change this, so they ordered new lutheran art and reconstruction of old churches. At the start of the 17th century, the time was right. The city of Stavanger became more and more popular for immigrants who worked as artists.

The first of these artists was the German born painter Peter Reimers (active 1607–25), whose art work first appeared in Kinsarvik during 1607. Reimers left more than forty large and small church work dating from 1607 to 1626. He performed a variety of decorative works and altarpieces as well as portraits. Reimers was succeeded by Gottfried Hendtzschel, who was initially hired by the widow of Peter Reimers to complete her husband's assignments. Other significant artists from the period include Andrew Lawrenceson Smith (Anders Smith) and craftsmen Thomas and Laurits Snekker.

== See also ==
- Cartilage Baroque

== Other sources ==
- Froysaker, Tine (2003) Church Paintings of Gottfried Hendtzschel in Norway - Part I & II (Goteborg University) ISBN 91-7346-455-4
- Gundhus, Grethe (2005) I Guds og Bevaringens navn Fortellingen om tre altertavler og et øksemord (Kulturminner – en ressurs i tiden)
- Kloster, Robert (1936) Stavangerrenessansen i Rogalands kirker (Stavanger Museum)
- Cristie, Sigrid (1982) Materi og skulptur 1536-1814 (Norges kunsthistorie, Volume 3) ISBN 82-05-12267-9
- Grevenor, Henrik (1928) Norsk malerkunst :under renessanse og barokk 1550-1700
