= Avaldsnes Kongsgård estate =

Historical King's estate in Norway

Coordinates: 59°21′24″N 5°17′31″E

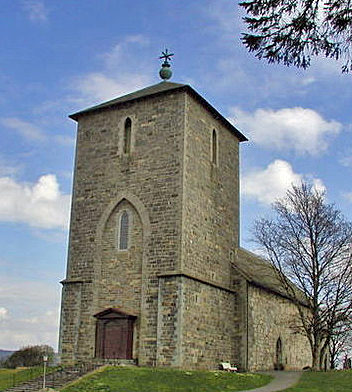
Avaldsnes Kongsgård estate was located right next to Avaldsnes Church, formally known as St. Olav's Church.

The Avaldsnes Kongsgård estate (Norwegian: Avaldsnes kongsgård) was a king's estate (Kongsgård) which is believed to be the oldest royal residence and seat of power in Norwegian history. The estate was located in the present day village of Avaldsnes in the county of Rogaland.

== History ==
=== Viking age ===
The estate was established by King Harald Fairhair, the first king of a united Norway, shortly after the Battle of Hafrsfjord in the year 872. Avaldsnes was one of the five similar estates the king built along the Norwegian west coast. The location of the estate was likely chosen because of its strategic position in the Karmsund strait and proximity to the trading post Notow, which proved useful for trade with the British Isles and other European merchants.

=== Middle ages ===
Over time, the estate became a significant bastion for the Birkebeiner party during the Norwegian civil war era. The Birkebeiner leader, Håkon Håkonsson, ruled most of Western Norway from the estate and would also build St. Olav's Church at Avaldsnes, raising the church on the foundations of an original church that had been built by Olav Tryggvason.

The fortified, castle-like estate residence, with a great hall, secret passages, residential chambers and a tall watchtower, was likely built some time during the 12th century and is mentioned in letters written by kings Eirik II Magnusson and Håkon V Magnusson. In the year 1367, Haakon VI of Norway came into conflict with the powerful Hanseatic League, which eventually led to the destruction of the fortified estate when members of the league burned the castle to the ground.

== Recent archeological discovery ==
While it was well known for a long time that Avaldsnes had played a significant role in the Norwegian Viking age and Middle Ages, the size, extent and appearance of the fortified estate at Avaldsnes was relatively unknown until archeological excavations dere made during the summer of 2017. The estate is now believed to be one of five similar Norwegian Kongsgård estates built in stone—the other estates being located in Tønsberg, Trondheim, Bergen and Oslo.
