= Notow =

Medieval trading port near Avaldsnes, Norway

Notow (or Nothaw, Notau, probably a Germanization of Nautøy, which again may have evolved into the present Nottå) was a trading port located at the northeastern part of the island of Karmøy, or more specifically located at the king's port area in Avaldsnes. According to the 16th century book Die Nordische Saw, the first Hanseatic Kontor established in Norway (before Bryggen in Bergen) was based in Notow. However, despite a Hanseatic presence at Notow, the existence of a Hanseatic "Kontor" or permanent trading post there is not supported by contemporary sources, and not accepted among modern historians.

At Bukkøy there currently exist places named Nora Nottå, Søra Nottå and Nåttåhavn which probably derives from the earlier Notow.

== Contemporary writing ==
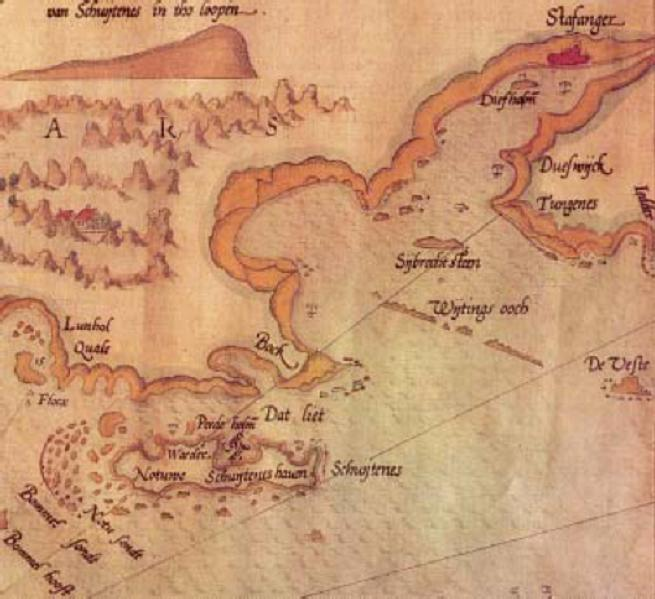
A 1588 map of Norway showing "Notuwe" in northern Karmøy.

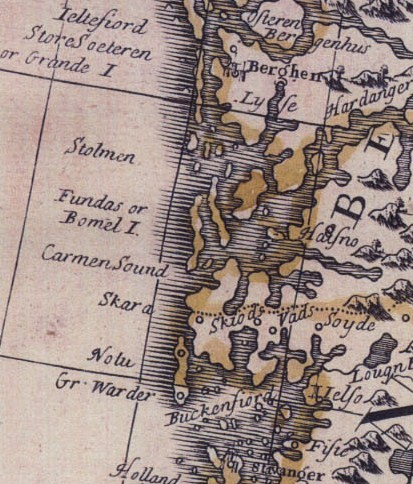
A later map (1720) of Norway showing "Notu" in northern Karmøy.

An early mention of the Hanseatics at Avaldsnes is in a letter by Norwegian king Haakon VI from around 1370. Here he writes about the Hanseatics which "at peacetime raided and burned the king's farms at Avaldsnes and others by the Karmsund, his forests near Selbjørn, the houses for poor travelers between Karmsund and Bergen, and also farms and houses at the Karmsund that belonged to the kings subjects". The Hanseatics has here apparently destroyed everything the king owns near the coast from Bergen to perhaps the Swedish border. The reasons for this attack by the Hansa was that the king had tried to limit the Hanseatics trade in Norway.

Notow is also later specifically mentioned in numerous Hanseatic and Norwegian documents between 1425 and 1523.

In a testament from 1425 it is written: "Item to Notow geve ik 2 tunnen teres to dem buwe" ("Likewise I give two barrels of tar for construction-purposes in Notow"). This suggests that the Hansa wasn't only residing in the port, but also being involved in construction of new projects there.

In the winter of 1470/71 the Lübeck fleet for Bergen is known to have stayed at Notow.

In a letter from Lübeck, probably in or around 1486, it is described how in the years 1450-55 Hanseatic ships and people, in Bergen and other places, had been exposed to great violence and robberies. Among the places mentioned was Notouw where "Oloff Nyelsson" and Bishop "Torlaus de Engelschen" had attacked Hanseatic ships which held great values. (Note: Diplomatarium Norvegicum XVI p.317 Date: 1486? Place: Lübeck. "[...] Anno liiij jn den pinxten nemen de Engelschen by den | Schagen deme kopmanne viij schepe gheladen de werde van xvj | dusent marck, Dar na vth Engelland quemen to Notouw ij laden | schepe myt wande de werde van x dusent marck Lub. Dar na | makede de kopman vth volk vnde schepe, vnde dachte synen | schaden na tokamende, do entf#orde Here Oloff Nyelsson vnd | Bisschop Torlauus de Engelschen vnde nemen dar vor vjc Rin- | sche gulden ij scharlaken vnde jslick dener eyn halff laken | Do suluest te Scheringessunde vnde to Maestrande nam | Here Oloff vnde Nyelsz Petersson vnde ere zelschop vele, laden | schepe sunderges Clawes Ghysen Tho Seel#o xi schepe vnde ij | van Rostock bauen den vreden des Heren konynges vnde vor- | segelinge [des H1 der iiij Ryddere vnde der Stede pryuilegie | Schade x dusent marck [...]")

Written sources, such as these, suggests that Notow in the 15th century was controlled by the Hansa of Bergen and Lübeck.

In 1584 an unknown German in Bergen wrote a curious text called Die Nordische Saw (The Norwegian sow (Note: Sow as in female pig)). In the text, Nothaw is said to have been for a long time one of the four original Kontor of the Hansa, along with London, Novgorod and Bruges. The text thus implies that Notow was the first place where the Hansa was established in Norway, but from here they soon had to relocate to Bergen due to consistent trouble with "pirates". (It has been speculated that these "pirates" in reality were representatives for the Norwegian king.). This claim is, however, not supported by any other sources, and not generally accepted by historians.

Dutch maritime maps from the last part of the 16th and the 17th century also locate Notow at Avaldsnes.

== Archaeological excavations ==
At the bottom of the sea of the coast near Avaldsnes Church (between Gloppenes and Fårøy) there has been found numerous ceramics of German and Dutch origins, in addition to leather, glass, animal bones and such. These objects are mostly just simple waste from the settlement of the port. Almost all of these items have been dated to the period between the 13th, and the 16th century.

Medieval shipwrecks have also been found, with one being radiocarbon-dated to between 1230 and 1280. This shipwreck is now about 17 meters long, but the ship was probably around 22 meters long when it was in use. As the ship was made of timber from oak, it was most likely built in southern Scandinavia.

More odd items found is a musical instrument known as a "Pilgrim's horn", made in the German town of Aachen in the 15th century where such horns are known to have been used at coronation ceremonies or religious holidays, and a mortar made of Rhine basalt. This is evidences of contact across the North Sea.

There has not been found any certain traces of Notow on land, but Bukkøy presently is covered in a rather thick pine forest, making searches more difficult.

== Bibliography ==
- Elvestad, Endre (2002), The Kings' port, the cultural landscape and the North Sea - a story of a maritime centre at Avaldsnes, Rogaland, Stavanger Maritime Museum
- Elvestad, Endre (2003), Middelalderhavnen ved Avaldsnes, Stavanger Sjøfartsmuseum
