= Ancient Diocese of Stavanger =

Roman Catholic diocese in Norway (1125 - 1537)

Coordinates: 58.969787°N 5.733162°E

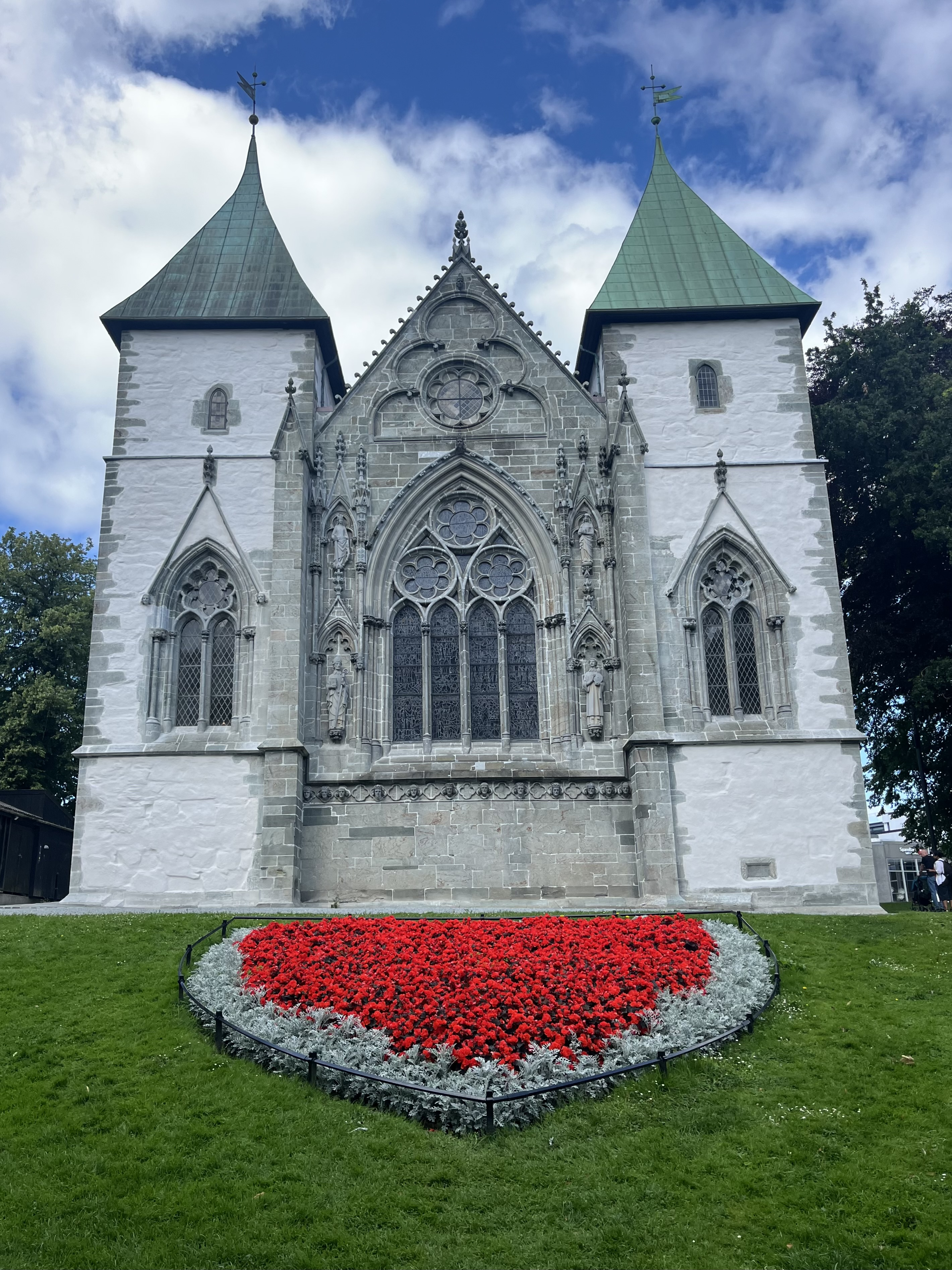
Stavanger Cathedral from around 1150

The former Catholic Diocese of Stavanger in Norway included the modern counties of Rogaland and Agder together with the regions of Valdres and Hallingdal and the parishes of Eidfjord and Røldal from Hordaland. It existed from the beginning of the 12th century to the Protestant Reformation.

== History ==
The bishopric was formed early in the 12th century out of the southern portion of the Diocese of Bergen, which had included until then the whole of Western Norway (Gulating). Reinald, an Englishman and most probably a Benedictine monk from Winchester Cathedral, was the first Bishop of Stavanger. With the money given him in 1128 by King Sigurd Jorsalefarer, for allowing that monarch to marry one Cecilia during the lifetime of his consort Queen Malmfrid, Reinald began the cathedral and founded the chapter. He was hanged at Bergen in 1135 by King Harald Gille upon his refusing to pay fifteen marks of gold to that monarch, who suspected him of concealing the treasures belonging to King Magnus IV of Norway.

Reinald's successor, John Birgerssön, was translated to the archdiocese of Trondhjem in 1152, as was also Bishop Eric Ivarssön in 1188. The great quarrel lasting from 1294 to 1303, which Bishop Arne (1276 – 1303) had with his chapter, was terminated only by the intervention of King Haakon, who decided in favour of the chapter and decreed, among other things, that they should have a voice in all nominations to, and deprivations of, benefices in the diocese. Bishop Gutterm Paalssön (1343 – 1350) died of the Black Death. His successor, Arne Aslakssön, also died suddenly at Avignon, where he had gone to seek a dispensation super defectu natalium.

Pope Clement VI then appointed Sigfrid, a Swedish Dominican, Bishop of Stavanger by papal provision in 1351. Most of his successors were appointed in the same way after agreement with the king. In 1352 Sigfrid was transferred to Oslo, while Gyrd Aslessön, who had just been appointed to that bishopric, had to accept in 1354 the less lucrative See of Stavanger. He was soon succeeded by Botolph Asbjornssön (1355 – 1381), who gave his library to the chapter and compiled a Domesday Book (Jordebog) for the diocese. It has since disappeared. Bishop Audum Eivindssön (1426 – 1455) built many churches and gave the episcopal tithes of Valdres to the Brigittines of Munkeliv Abbey near Bergen in 1441 in their hour of need. The last Catholic bishop was Hoskuld Hoskuldsson (1513 – 1537), who was taken prisoner by Thord Rod at Bergen and died there.

The only monastery of importance was the Augustinian Utstein Abbey, founded in about 1280. The bishops of Stavanger had many disputes with the abbots of Utstein. In 1537 the abbey was handed over to Thrond Ivarssön, who had however to maintain the monks. Other monasteries are said to have existed in the Diocese of Stavanger, but little or nothing is known of them. There was a hospital dedicated to St. Peter at Stavanger itself.

A new Lutheran Diocese of Stavanger was founded in 1537 as legal heir of the ancient Diocese.

== The Bishops of Stavanger before the Reformation ==
- c. 1112–1135 : Reinald
- 1135–1152: Jon Birgersson, promoted to Archbishop of Nidaros in 1152
- 1152–11??: Peter
- 11??–1171: Amund
- 1171–1188: Eirik Ivarsson, promoted to Archbishop of Nidaros in 1188
- 1189/90–1207: Njål
- 1207–1224: Henrik, 1207–1224
- 1226–1254: Askell Jonsson
- 1255–1276: Torgils
- 1277–1303: Arne
- 1304–1317: Ketil
- 1318–1322: Håkon Halldorsson
- 1322–1342: Eirik Ogmundsson
- 1343–1350: Guttorm Pålsson
- 1351–1352: Sigfrid, Bishop of Oslo since 1352
- 1354–1355: Gyrd Aslason
- 1355–1380: Bottolf Asbjørnsson
- 1380/1381: Hallgeirr Osmundsson
- 1381/1382–1398/1400: Olaf
- 1400–1426: Håkon Ivarsson
- 1427–1445: Audun Eyvindsson
- 1445–1451/53: Gunnar Eriksson
- 1454–1463: Sigurd Bjørnsson
- 1464–1478: Alv Thorgardsson
- 1481–1512: Eiliv Jonsson
- 1513–1537: Hoskuld Hoskuldsson
