= Avaldsnes Church =

Church in Rogaland, Norway

- Avaldsnes kirke
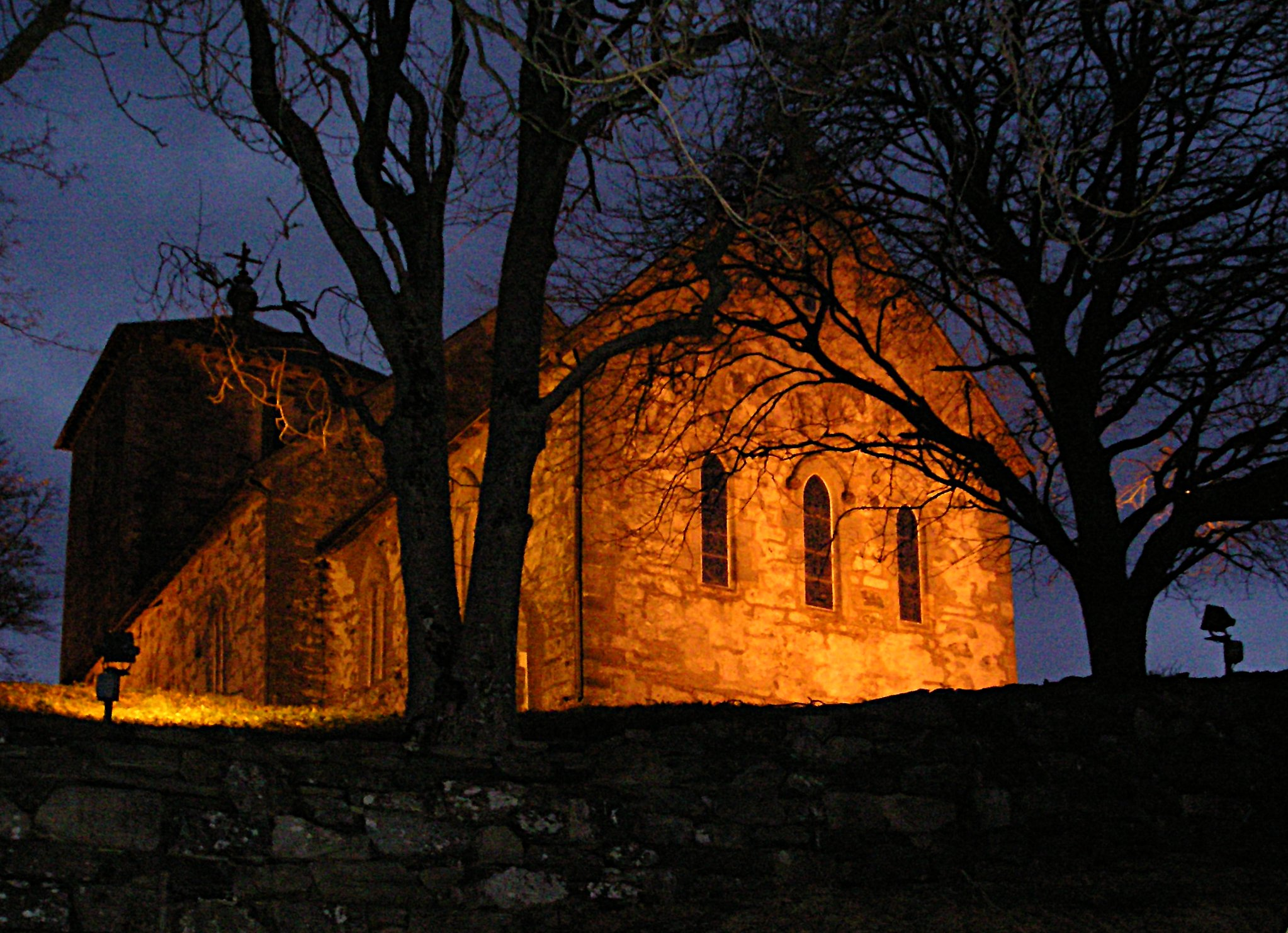
- View of the church
- Avaldsnes Church
- 59.35591°N 5.291558°E
- Location: Karmøy Municipality, Rogaland
- Country: Norway
- Denomination: Church of Norway
- Previous denomination: Catholic Church
- Churchmanship: Evangelical Lutheran

History
- Status: Parish church
- Founded: 11th century
- Dedication: Saint Olav

Architecture
- Functional status: Active
- Architectural type: Long church
- Style: Gothic
- Groundbreaking: c. 1250
- Completed: 1320

Specifications
- Capacity: 400
- Length: 47 metres (154 ft)
- Width: 13.5 metres (44 ft)
- Materials: Stone, wooden roof

Administration
- Diocese: Stavanger bispedømme
- Deanery: Karmøy prosti
- Parish: Avaldsnes
- Norwegian Cultural Heritage Site
- Type: Church
- Status: Automatically protected
- ID: 83833

Avaldsnes Church (Norwegian: Avaldsnes kirke, formally St. Olav's Church at Avaldsnes, Norwegian: St Olavskirken på Avaldsnes) is a parish church of the Church of Norway in Karmøy Municipality in Rogaland county, Norway. It is located in the village of Avaldsnes on the northern part of the island of Karmøy. It is the church for the Avaldsnes parish which is part of the Karmøy prosti (deanery) in the Diocese of Stavanger. The medieval stone church was built in a long church design by an unknown architect. The first church located here was likely built before the year 1024 on the site of Avaldsnes Kongsgård estate. The present stone church was built in 1250. The church seats about 400 people.

== History ==
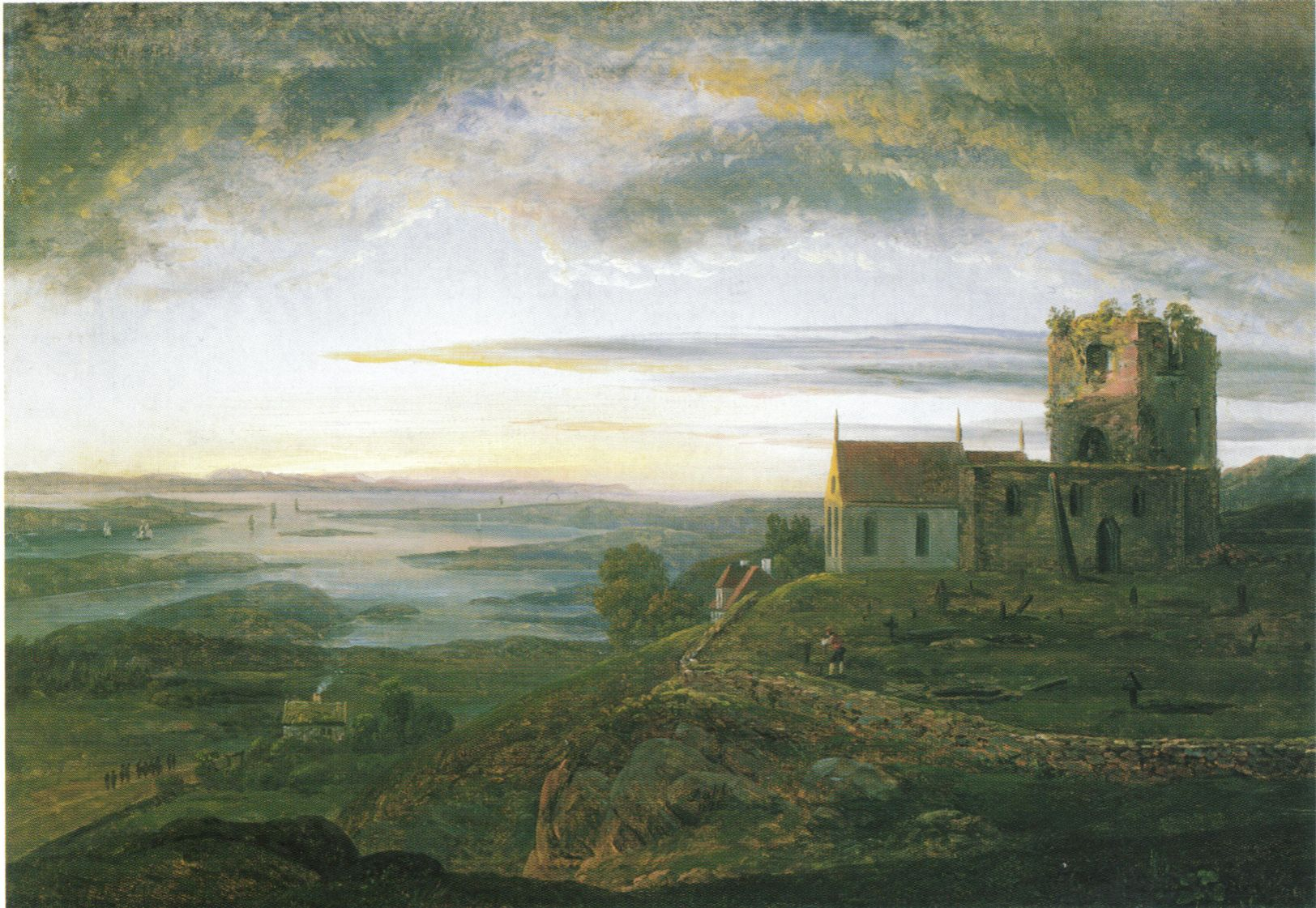
Ruined Church at Avaldsnes at Karmøy, Johan Christian Dahl (1820)

Before this church was constructed, there was a wooden church on the same site around the year 1024. That church is assumed to have been built by Olav Trygvason, and it is possible that the present stone church is built around this church originally. The church was mentioned by the historian Snorri Sturluson in chapter 19 of his book Soga om Olav den heilage.

This church has been a landmark for seafarers passing through the Karmsundet strait for 750 years. King Håkon IV Håkonsson gave permission to replace the old wooden church with a stone church around the year 1250. The new stone building was not completed until nearly 1320, and was then the fourth largest in the country. The church was dedicated to St. Olav and received the status of "Royal Chapel". During the same period it became one of four "college-churches" (it appointed a council of theological and juridical scholars). Probably there was a group of four scholars and teachers in law and theology. The stone church had a rectangular nave and narrower, rectangular chancel as well as a large tower to the west.

There was an octagonal stone room located to the south of the quire. This octagonal room was a chapter house (kapittelhus). These rooms were common for English cathedrals and they were used for large group meetings. This room is assumed to have been referenced in 1599 by clergyman and historical writer Peder Claussøn Friis (1545–1614). Remaining walls for this room were visible as late as 1840, but are now completely gone.

Decay started with the Black Death in 1349–1351. This disaster was followed by 400 years of Danish supremacy. In this period, the church gradually fell into a state of ruin due to lack of repair. By 1599, the quire was the only room left in the old church that was still usable. During the 17th century, a little wooden church was built inside the stone walls and this was used for more than 200 years.

In 1814, this church served as an election church (Norwegian: valgkirke). Together with more than 300 other parish churches across Norway, it was a polling station for elections to the 1814 Norwegian Constituent Assembly which wrote the Constitution of Norway. This was Norway's first national elections. Each church parish was a constituency that elected people called "electors" who later met together in each county to elect the representatives for the assembly that was to meet at Eidsvoll Manor later that year.

The first restoration work began in 1830. The old steeple was demolished, the nave was rebuilt, and a small wooden steeple was erected on the top. In the 1920s the church was once again restored in a manner which was more similar to its original architecture. A new stone steeple was built and the interior renewed.

The German occupation in World War II became dramatic for the church. German officials asserted that the high steeple was used as a landmark for Allied planes, coming in over the strait of Karmsund to drop bombs in the water. German authorities demanded the steeple be demolished. Many people were engaged in the task of saving it, and they persuaded the German military to let them camouflage the whole church with timber. This was to be done in 5 weeks, but the whole job lasted a year. The front of the church bears a couple of bullet holes.

The stained glass windows were ordered for the 700th anniversary in 1950. They were the creation of by Norwegian artist Bernhard Greve (1886-1962) from Lofthus who worked mainly with stained glass, fresco, and ceramic sculpture. The windows portrayed important events in the life of Christ: baptism, passion, ascension, and resurrection.

The altar, baptismal font, and pulpit were designed in the 1920s by Norwegian functionalist architect Eivind Moestue (1893-1977). The baptismal basin dates back to the 16th century.

== Design and architecture ==
The pointed arches, but thick walls and no pillars, suggest an early Gothic design. The walls are composed of ordinary gray stone in thickness about 1.2 to 2 metres (3 ft 11 in to 6 ft 7 in). The corners and frames around the doors and windows are of steatite (soapstone) from Tolgetjønn near Haugesund.

== Mary's Needle ==
Mary's Needle (Norwegian: Jomfru Marias synål) is the only one remaining of several monumental stones which once stood around the church area. The stone has been somewhat taller, but, towering at 7.2 metres (24 ft) it is still the second largest of its kind in Norway. The stone leans in towards the church wall—the distance to the wall is in fact only 9.2 centimetres (3.6 in).

== Media gallery ==
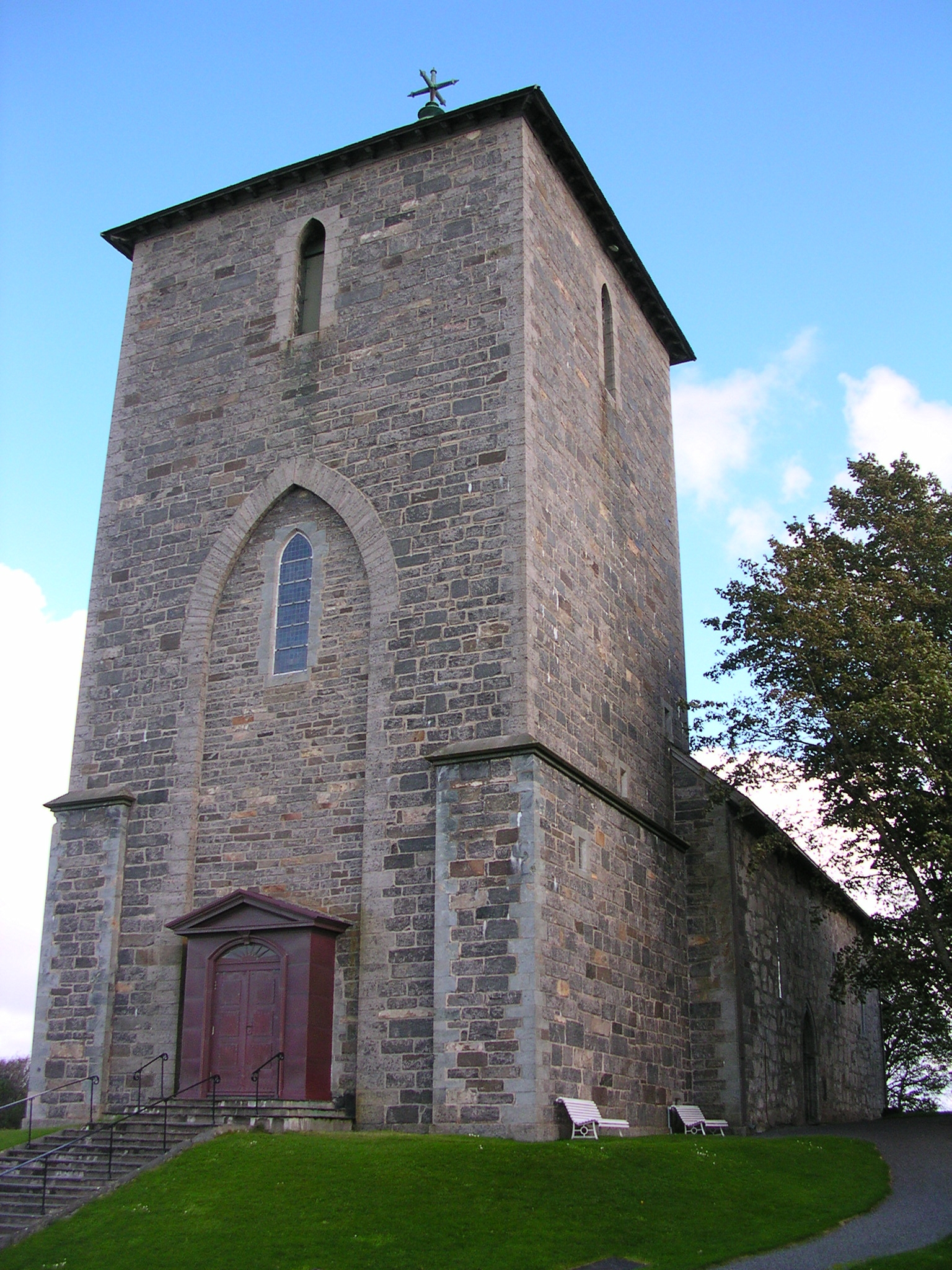
View of the church

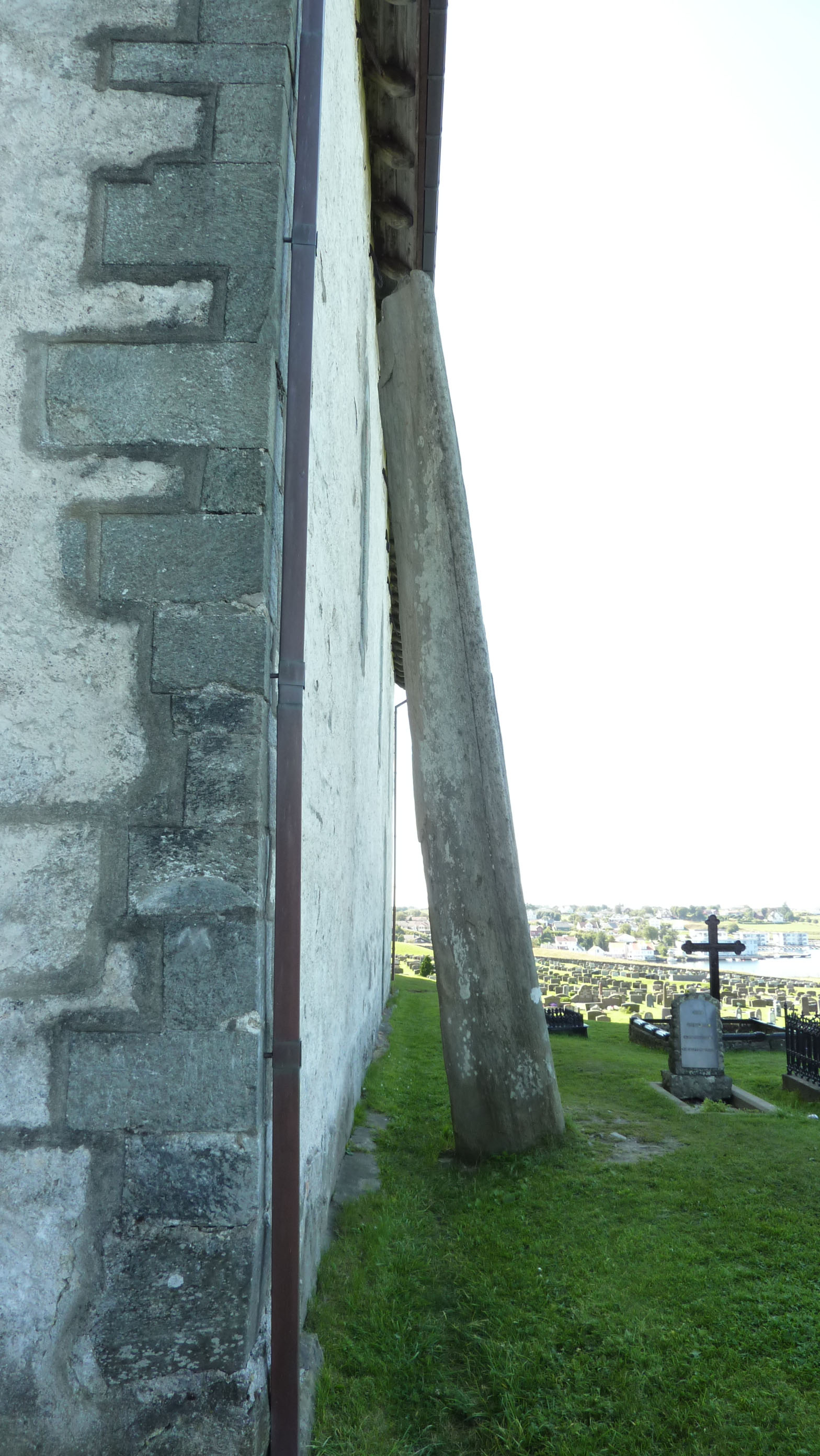
View of Mary's needle

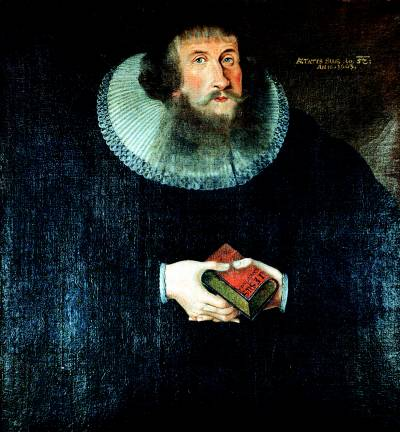
A 1663 painting of Christen Bentsen Schaaning by Scottish painter Andrew Smith

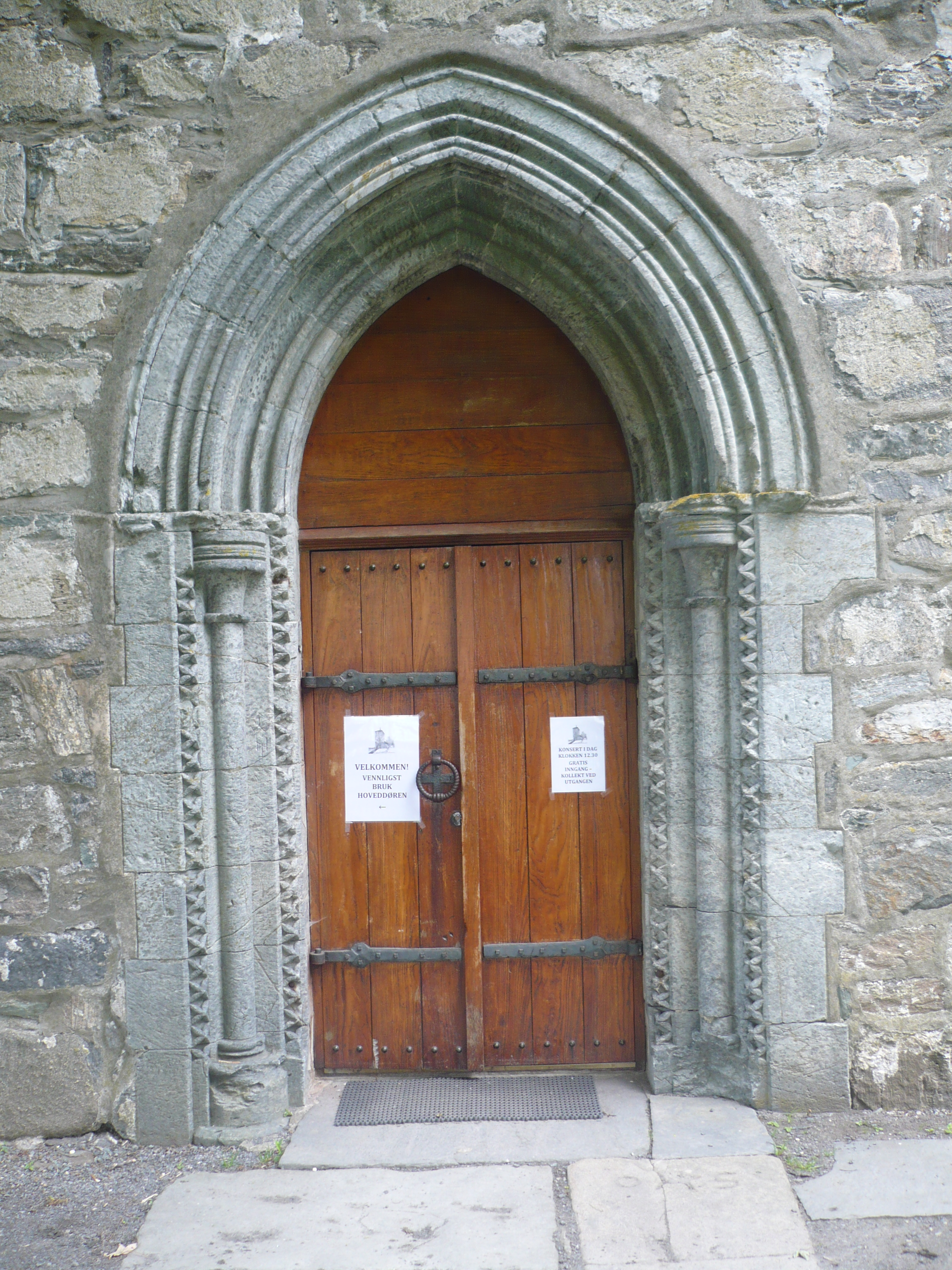
Main doors to the church

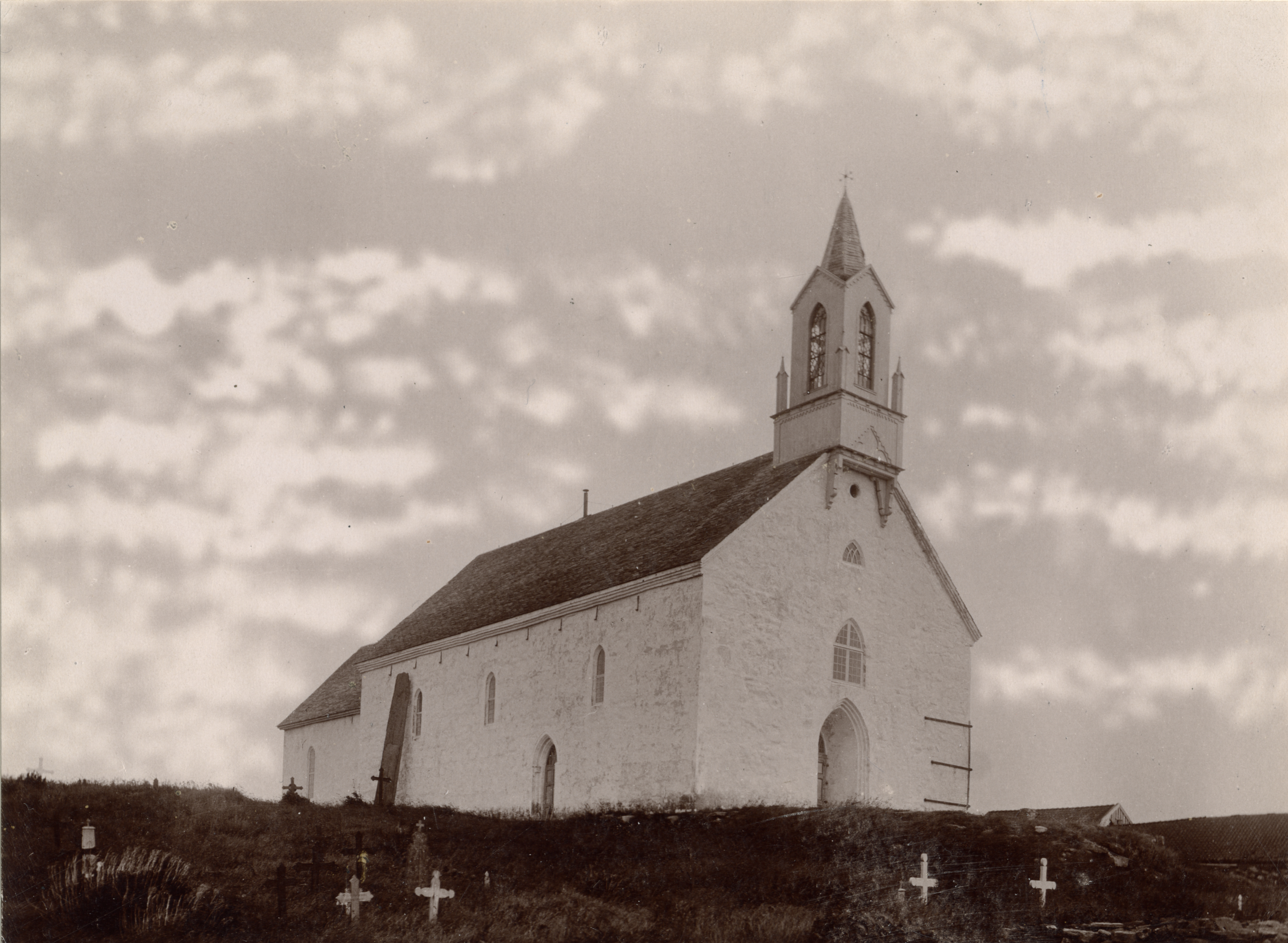
Historic view of the church with the old tower

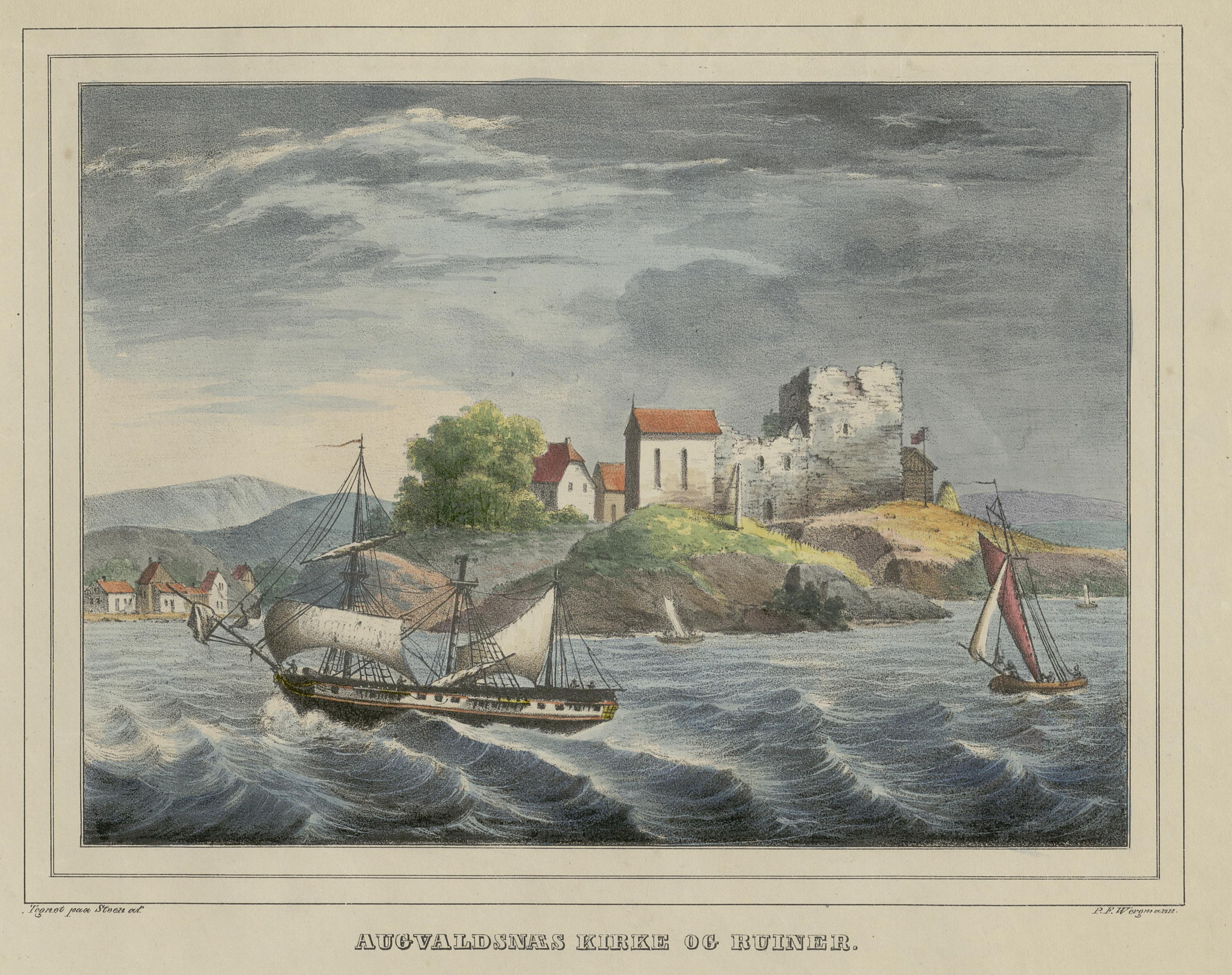
Painting of the church before its 19th-century renovations

== List of priests ==
Note: this list is not entirely complete, additionally medieval priests are only sporadically known.

- Bård (Bardones): 1290s-1301
- Eirik: 1298
- Hallr: 1322
- Jon: 1322
- Hallstein Sigurdsson: 1341
- Thorkel Vikingsson: 1392
- Asleuer Guttormsson: 1446
- Niels: 1518-1524
- Hans Diser: 1521
- Mikkel Schytte: 1531-1545
- Hans Klingenberg: 1540-
- Rasmus Torsen: 1553-1557
- Christoffer Sigurdsen: 1560-1606
- Abraham Engelbretsson Karsund: 1607-1628
- Christen Bentsen Schaaning: 1634-1679
- Bernt Christensen Schaaning: 1679-1689
- Christen Christoffersen Hegelund: 1689-1695
- Lucas Rasmussen Friis: 1690-1695
- Anders Christoffersen Hegelund: 1695-1710
- Claus Claussen Munkeberg: 1711-1732
- Peder Anderssen Scheen: 1732-1734
- Knud Leem: 1734-1752
- Jens Jenssen Saxe: 1752-1763
- Peder Nicolai Daldorph: 1764-1773
- Richard Berg: 1773-1776
- Carsten Henrik Schanche: 1776-1789
- Jørgen Sverdrup: 1789-1807
- Hans Nicolai Cormontan: 1807-1814
- Johannes Irgens von Hadeln: 1814-1826
- Jacob von der Lippe: 1825-1831
- Johan Lyder Brun: 1832-1848
- Otto Ludvig Sinding: 1848-1860
- Jakob Wetlesen: 1861-1869
- Lars Oftedahl: 1870-1871
- Thomas Fredrik Weybye Barth: 1871-1879
- Johan Christian Selmer Andersen: 1879-1890
- Rasmus Mathias Rasmussen: 1891-1907
- Endre Pedersen Hove: 1908-1918
- Sverre Hougsnæs: 1919-1933
- Lars Skadberg: 1933-1956

== See also ==
- List of churches in Rogaland
