= Jon Birgersson =

Jon Birgersson (died 24 February 1157) was a Norwegian clergyman, bishop, and the first archbishop of the archdiocese of Nidaros. His father's name was Birger, but his year of birth is unknown. He served as bishop of the diocese of Stavanger from 1135. From 1152 or 1153 he was appointed archbishop of Nidaros. He died in Trondheim in 1157.
