= Reinald of Stavanger =

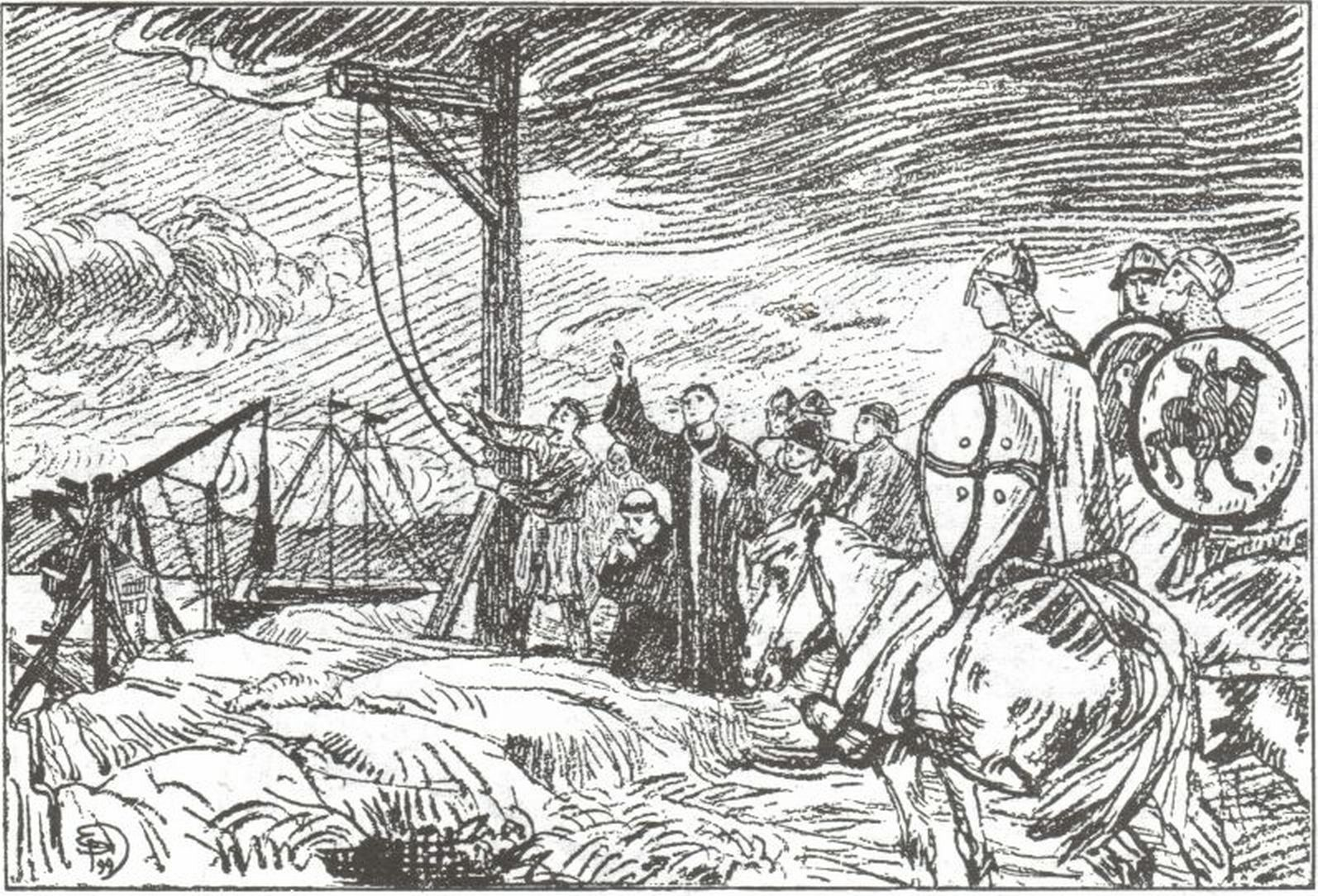
The hanging of Bishop Reinald. Illustration by Eilif Peterssen.

Reinald (died 18 January 1135) was a Norwegian Catholic bishop of Stavanger. He was the first bishop of the Diocese of Stavanger.

It has been discussed if he came from Winchester in England.

He is known for the construction work of the Stavanger Cathedral. Even if the construction period of the cathedral was about 1100 to 1150.

Being in conflict with the king, Harald Gille, he was hanged in Bergen on 18 January 1135. Other than that, he was also fined very shortly before for not disclosing information on gold treasures hidden by Magnus the Blind.
