= Avaldsnes =

Village in Karmøy Municipality, Norway

- Village
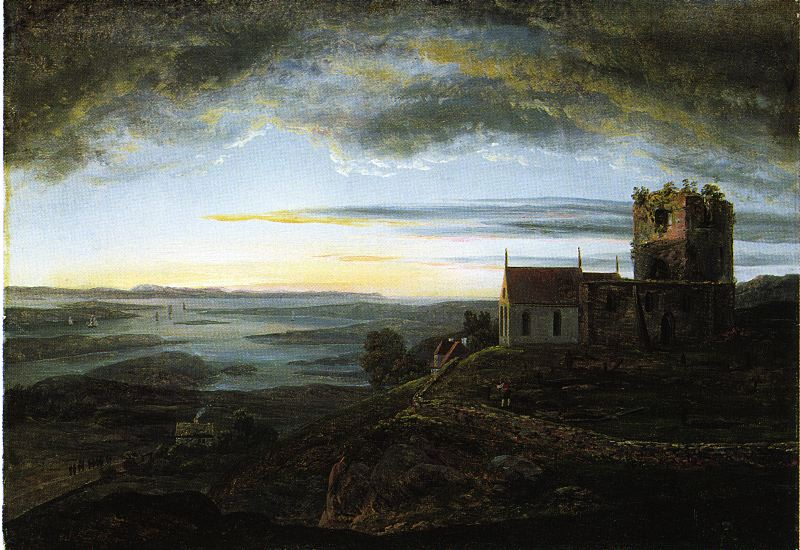
- View of St. Olav’s Church at Avaldsnes; Johan Christian Dahl (1820)
- Interactive map of Avaldsnes
- Coordinates: 59.35392°N 5.28324°E
- Country: Norway
- Region: Western Norway
- County: Rogaland
- District: Haugaland
- Municipality: Karmøy Municipality

Area
  - Total: 3.23 km^{2} (1.25 sq mi)
- Elevation: 16 m (52 ft)

Population (2025)
  - Total: 2,876
  - Density: 890/km^{2} (2,300/sq mi)
- Time zone: UTC+01:00 (CET)
  - Summer (DST): UTC+02:00 (CEST)
- Post Code: 4262 Avaldsnes

Avaldsnes is a village in Karmøy Municipality in Rogaland county, Norway. The village is located on the northeastern part of the island of Karmøy, along the Karmsundet strait, just south of the town of Haugesund. The 3.23-square-kilometre (800-acre) village has a population (2025) of 2,876 and a population density of 890 inhabitants per square kilometre (2,300/sq mi).

Avaldsnes has been described as "Norway's oldest capital" because it was the primary residency of Harald Fairhair who unified Norway into one kingdom. The village was an ancient centre of power on the west coast of Norway and is the site of one of Norway's more important areas of cultural history. The trading port of Notow and the Avaldsnes Church are two notable historic sites in Avaldsnes. The village was the administrative centre of the old Avaldsnes Municipality which existed from 1838 until 1965.

== History ==
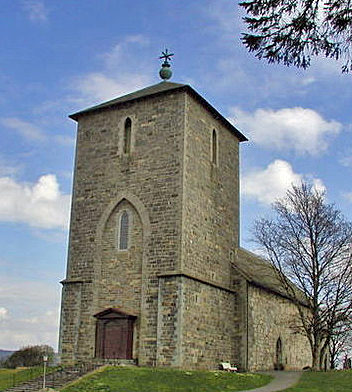
St. Olav's Church of Avaldsnes

Avaldsnes is believed to have been named after the legendary King Augvald, who allegedly had his seat in the area surrounding the Karmsundet strait. It was here that there was an ancient centre of power at Avaldsnes. At this point, the shipping route is forced into a narrow passage that runs along Avaldsnes. It is likely this for this reason that such power and riches were generated through the ages. King Harald Fairhair chose Avaldsnes for his main royal estate in about 870 making it the oldest royal seat in Norway.

According to legend, Olav Trygvason built Avaldsnes Church, apparently as a manor chapel for the king's residence. This would probably have been quite a small stave church. Construction of the present day church, called "St. Olav's Church of Avaldsnes" (Norwegian: Olavskirken) was started approximately 1250 AD, on the order of King Håkon Håkonsson. It was not completed until nearly 1320. Dedicated to St. Olav, it was one of the greatest Norwegian stone churches from the Middle Ages and it was one of only four royal collegiate churches in Norway. The church was an important station of the Pilgrim's Route to Nidaros Cathedral which ran along the coast.

"Written sources indicate that Avaldsnes was the predecessor of the later established Hansa kontor in Bergen", according to the website of the University of Vienna.

The village was selected as the millennium site for Rogaland county.

== Archaeology and excavation ==
Rich discoveries from prehistory have been made in the entire area. Reheia (also known as Blodheia) is located approximately 1 kilometre (1,100 yd) west of the Church. King Harald I of Norway located his main farm at Avaldsnes in about 870. In 953, King Haakon the Good fought a fierce battle at the Bloodheights (Slaget på Blodeheia ved Avaldsnes) against the sons of his half-brother King Eirik Bloodaxe. The forces of King Haakon won the battle and he would reign as King of Norway until his death during 961.

This site contains the only Norwegian example of Bronze Age burial mounds lined up in a row. A ship burial from the time of the Merovingian dynasty (approximately 680-750 AD) found here is the oldest ship burial uncovered within the Nordic countries.

=== Storhaug ===
Storhaug (lit. 'Great Mound'), a ship's burial mound, can be found to the north of the royal estate at Avaldsnes. Excavation of this burial mound started in 1886. The ship at Storhaug was made of oak and was placed in a north–south orientation. Stone walls of approximately 1 metre (3.3 ft) in height and width were built around the great ship. The Storhaug ship is commonly described as a large oar-powered vessel, with a breadth of 2.5 to 6 metres (8 ft 2 in to 19 ft 8 in).

=== Grønhaug ===
Grønhaug (lit. 'Green Mound'), the site of another ship burial, is situated 1 kilometre (0.62 mi) north of the church site. It was examined by Haakon Shetelig in 1902, and contained an approximately 15-metre (49 ft) long boat with remains of a man's grave from the 10th century. Dendrochronological studies carried out in 2009 show that the ships from Oseberg, Grønhaug, and Storhaug along with the boat found at Storhaug were all built from oak from the same area of Southwest Norway.

=== Flagghaugen ===
Flagghaugen (lit. 'Flag Hill'), from the Old Norse word haugr meaning hill or mound, is situated just north of the church. Originally it had a diameter of 43 metres (141 ft) and a height of 5 metres (16 ft), but it was flattened under the leadership of Pastor Lyder Brun in 1835. The mound turned out to be Norway's richest grave from the Roman period. The Avaldsnes find (Norwegian: Avaldsnesfunnet) contained a neck ring of 600 grams (19 ozt) of pure gold, weapons, bandolier mountings and various Roman tubs of silver and bronze.

=== Mary's Needle ===
Mary's Needle, known in Norwegian as the sewing needle of Virgin Mary (Norwegian: Jomfru Marias synål) is the only one remaining of several monumental stones which once stood around the church area. The stone has been somewhat taller, but, towering at 7.2 metres (24 ft) it is still the second largest of its kind in Norway. The stone leans in towards the church wall—the distance to the wall is in fact only 9.2 centimetres (3.6 in). A saga tells that "the day of Judgement will come when the stone comes into contact with the church wall". A popular story tells us about a minister in ages past who climbed the monument and cutting off a piece from the stone when it came dangerously near the church wall.

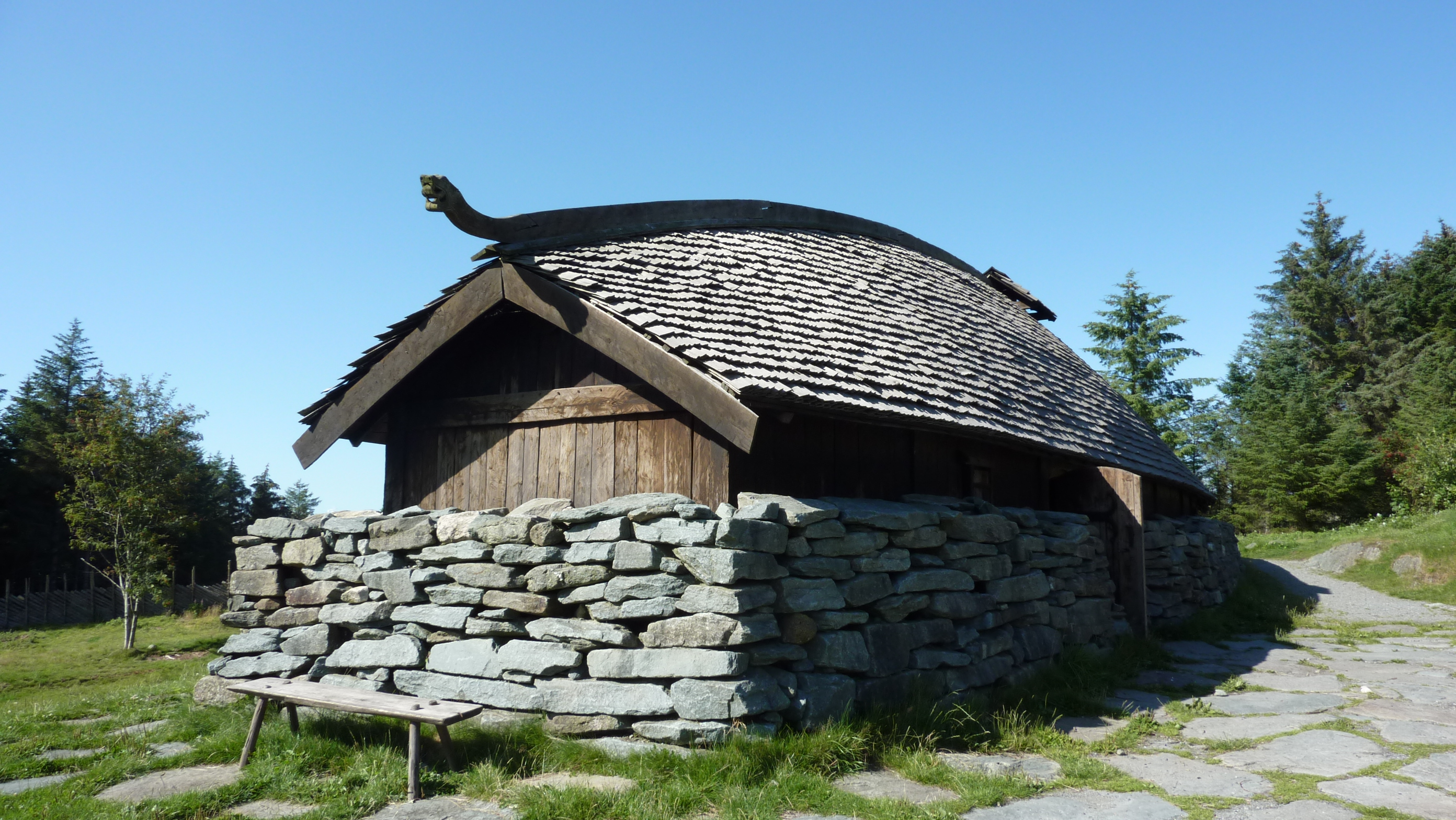
Reconstructed Viking longhouse at Avaldsnes Viking Farm

== Nordvegen History Centre ==
Nordvegen History Centre (Norwegian: Nordvegen historiesenter) was opened in 2005, in order to raise the profile of the historical qualities of Avaldsnes. The centre is located by the site of St. Olav's Church. To best preserve the integrity of the church stemming from the Middle Ages as well as the historical landscape, most of the centre is located underground.

There is a replica of a farm from the Viking Age with several buildings, including reproductions of a longhouse and boathouses on the island of Bukkøy. The 25-metre (82 ft) long house at the Viking farm is a trestle construction with curving walls and a double curved roof covered with wooden shingles.
