= Stavanger Cathedral =

Church in Rogaland, Norway

- The Cathedral of Saint Swithun
- Stavanger domkirke
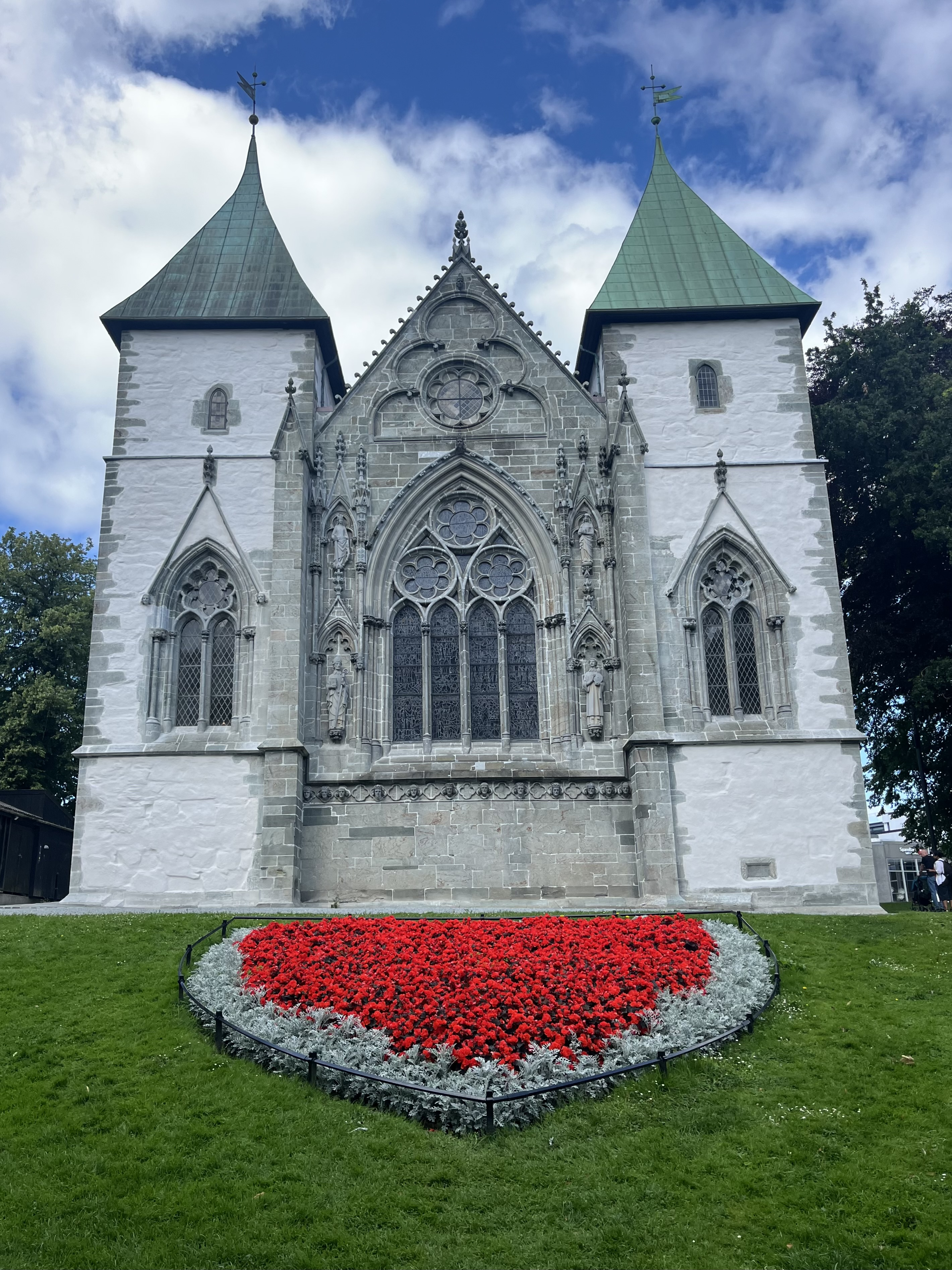
- Stavanger Cathedral in 2025
- Stavanger Cathedral
- 58.969787°N 5.733162°E
- Location: Stavanger Municipality, Rogaland
- Country: Norway
- Denomination: Church of Norway
- Previous denomination: Catholic Church
- Churchmanship: Evangelical Lutheran
- Website: stavangerdomkirke.no

History
- Status: Cathedral
- Founded: c. 1125
- Founder: Bishop Reinald
- Dedication: Saint Swithun

Architecture
- Functional status: Active
- Architectural type: Long church
- Style: Romanesque/Gothic
- Completed: c. 1150 (876 years ago)

Specifications
- Capacity: 800
- Materials: Stone

Administration
- Diocese: Stavanger bispedømme
- Deanery: Stavanger domprosti
- Parish: Domkirken og St. Petri

Clergy
- Bishop: Anne Lise Ådnøy
- Norwegian Cultural Heritage Site
- Type: Church
- Status: Automatically protected
- ID: 85552

Stavanger Cathedral (Norwegian: Stavanger domkirke) is Norway's oldest cathedral and the seat of the Bishop of Stavanger who leads the Diocese of Stavanger in the Church of Norway. It is located in the centre of the city of Stavanger which lies in the southwestern part of the large Stavanger Municipality in central Rogaland county, Norway. The church is situated in the centre of the city, in the borough of Storhaug between Breiavatnet in the south, the square with Vågen in the north west, the cathedral square in the north, and Kongsgård in the southwest.

It is one of the two churches for the Domkirken og St. Petri parish which is part of the Stavanger domprosti (arch-deanery) in the Diocese of Stavanger. The gray, stone church was built in a long church style around the year 1125 using designs by an unknown architect. The church seats about 800 people.

== History ==
Bishop Reinald, who may have come from Winchester in England, is said to have started construction of the cathedral around 1100. It was finished around 1150: the city of Stavanger counts 1125 as its year of foundation. The cathedral was dedicated to Saint Swithun, an early Bishop of Winchester and subsequently patron saint of Winchester Cathedral. The church was initially the seat of the Diocese of Stavanger within the Roman Catholic Church until the Protestant Reformation.

The church building originally had a wooden, rectangular nave with a narrower, rectangular, straight-ended and probably lower chancel. To the west it had a tall tower. The city of Stavanger was ravaged by fire in 1272, and the cathedral suffered heavy damage. It was rebuilt under Bishop Arne (1276–1303) at which time the Romanesque cathedral was enlarged in the Gothic style. The west tower was replaced after the fire with a vestibule with a somewhat larger base. The choir was newly built and extended, but the original width was maintained. Its east façade was erected with two corner towers and a large window. The Romanesque choir had crypts beneath it.

In 1682, King Christian V decided to move Stavanger's episcopal seat to the town of Kristiansand at the Kristiansand Cathedral. However, on Stavanger's 800th anniversary in 1925, King Haakon VII re-created the Diocese of Stavanger and appointed Jacob Christian Petersen (1870-1964) to serve as Stavanger's first bishop in nearly 250 years.

During a renovation of the building in the 1860s, the cathedral's exterior and interior were considerably altered. The stone walls were plastered, and the building lost much of its medieval appearance. A major restoration led by architect Gerhard Fischer in 1939–1964 partly reversed those changes. The latest major restoration of the cathedral was conducted in 1999. Scottish craftsman Andrew Lawrenceson Smith (ca. 1620-1694) is well-known for his works in Stavanger Cathedral.

At the entrance to the sacristy there are sculptures of King Magnus VI, King Eric II and King Haakon V. The baptismal font is estimated to be from around the year 1300. The Bishop's chair is from 1925.

=== Election church ===
In 1814, this church served as an election church (Norwegian: valgkirke). Together with more than 300 other parish churches across Norway, it was a polling station for elections to the 1814 Norwegian Constituent Assembly which wrote the Constitution of Norway. This was Norway's first national elections. Each church parish was a constituency that elected people called "electors" who later met together in each county to elect the representatives for the assembly that was to meet at Eidsvoll Manor later that year.

== Architecture ==
The Stavanger Cathedral basilica has three aisles with diaphragm arches and an elevated central nave of Romanesque design. At one end of the nave is a square chancel surrounding the altar. The central nave is an arcade with round pillars along its length. The capitals on the pillars contains many figures depicting scenes of Ragnarok (Norwegian: End of Days). Further masonry decorations include palmettes and arcatures on cornices.

The east exterior of the building has two towers that contain lancet windows. There are a variety of sculptures between the towers and central building.

Around the year 1660, the parapet of the gallery was decorated with motifs copied from the Cor Iesu Amanti Sacrum series, otherwise known as Emblems from the Heart. Of the original six motifs, three are on display in Stavanger Museum.

== Media gallery ==
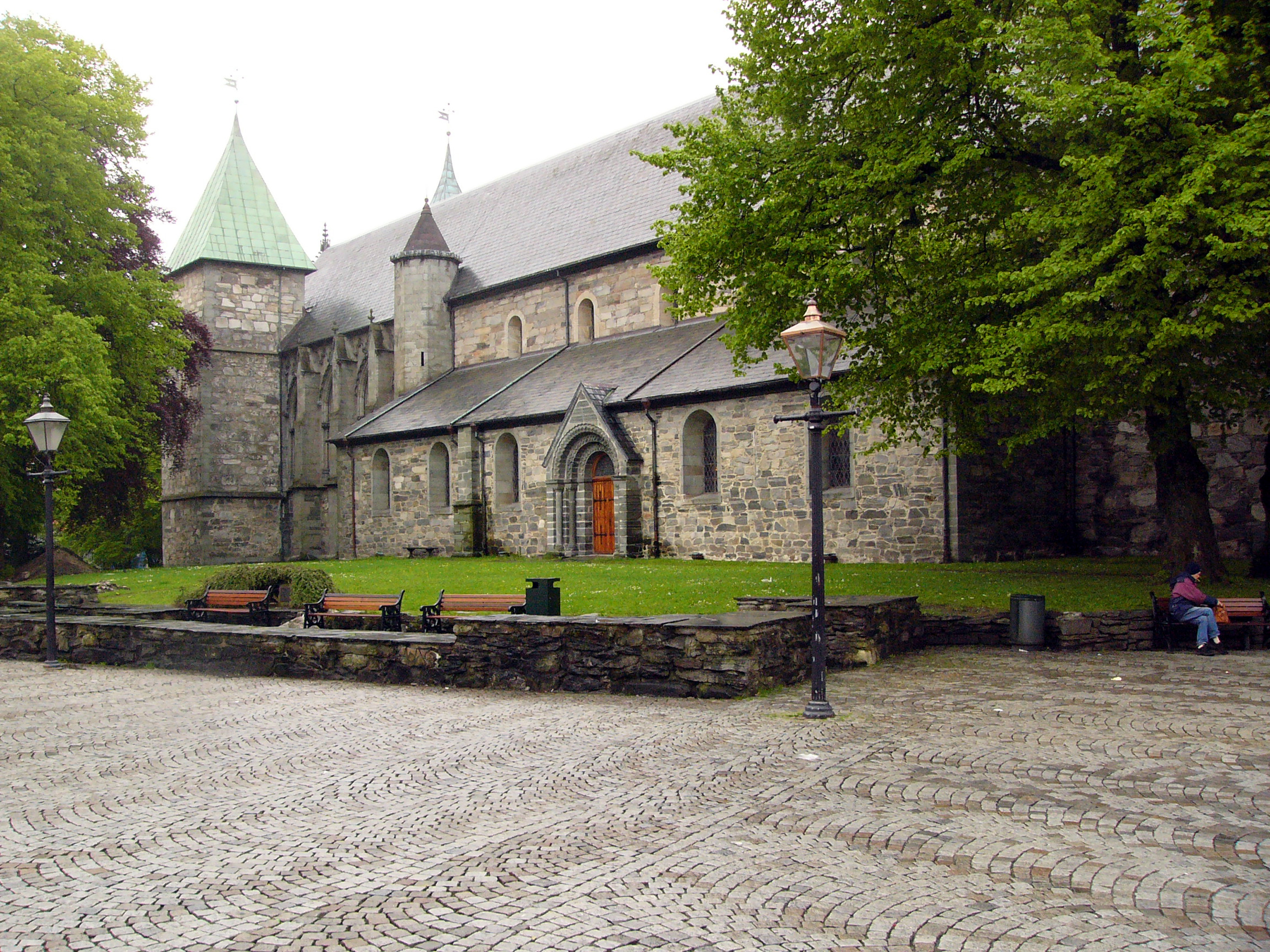
Exterior view

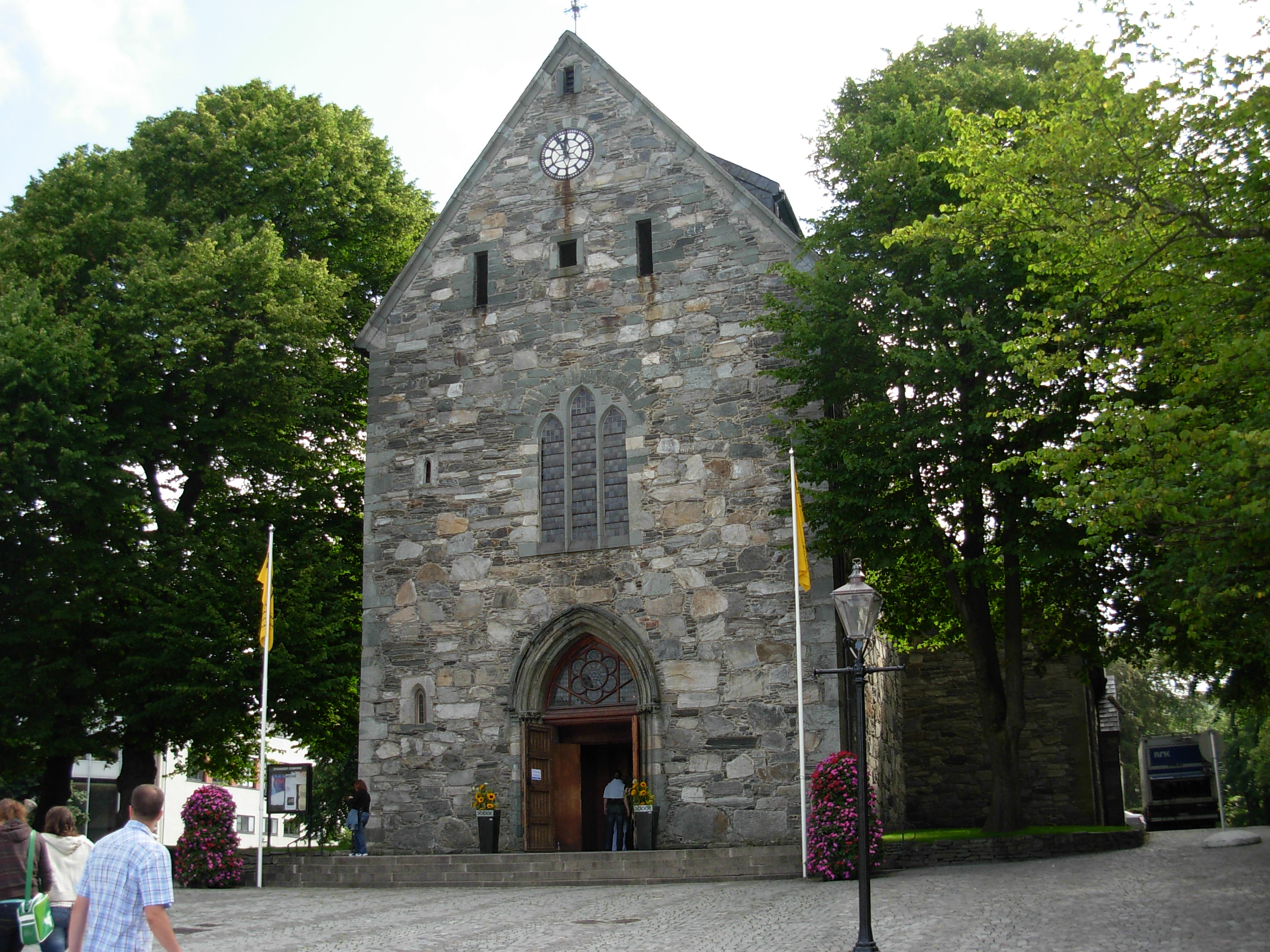
Front view

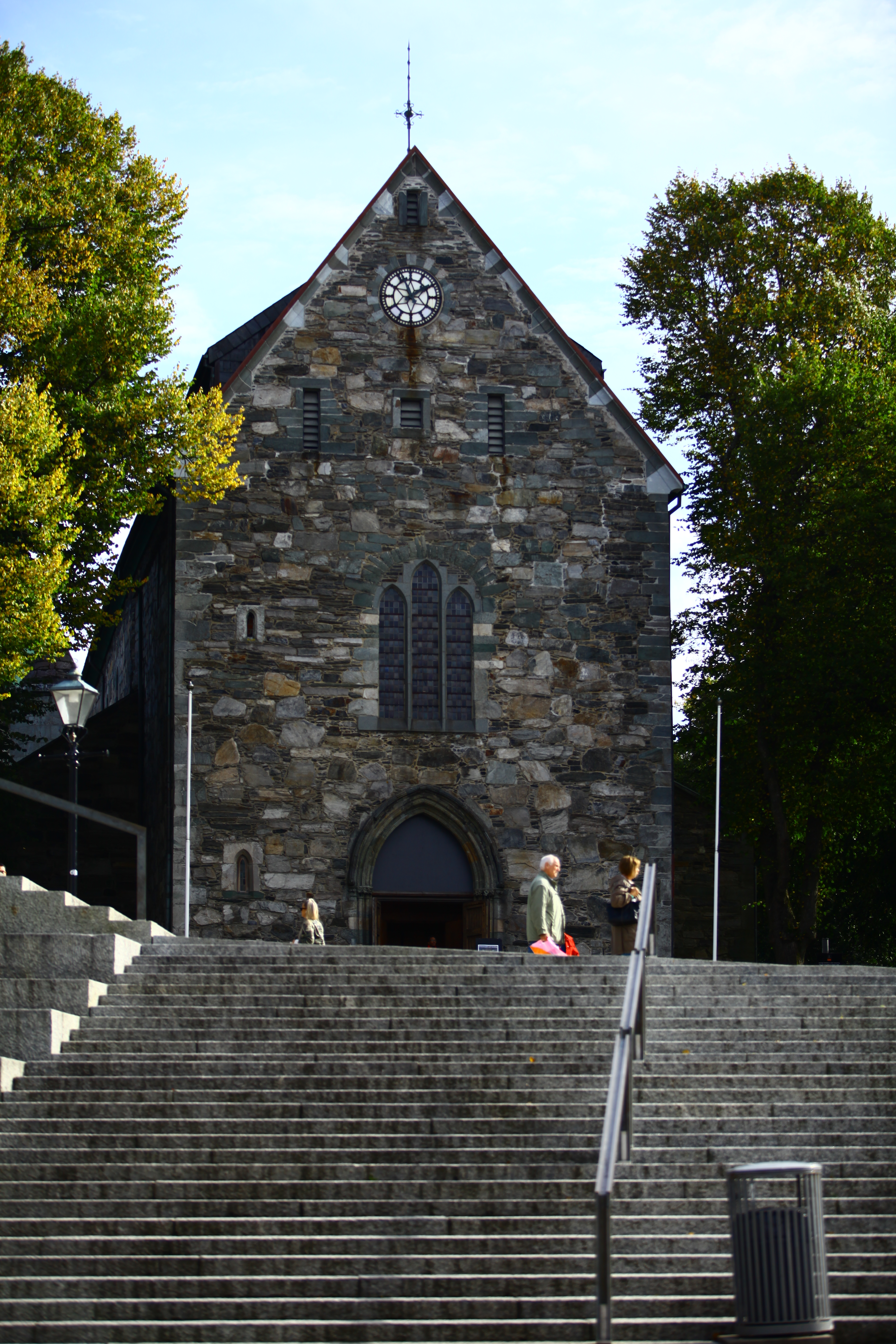
Front view

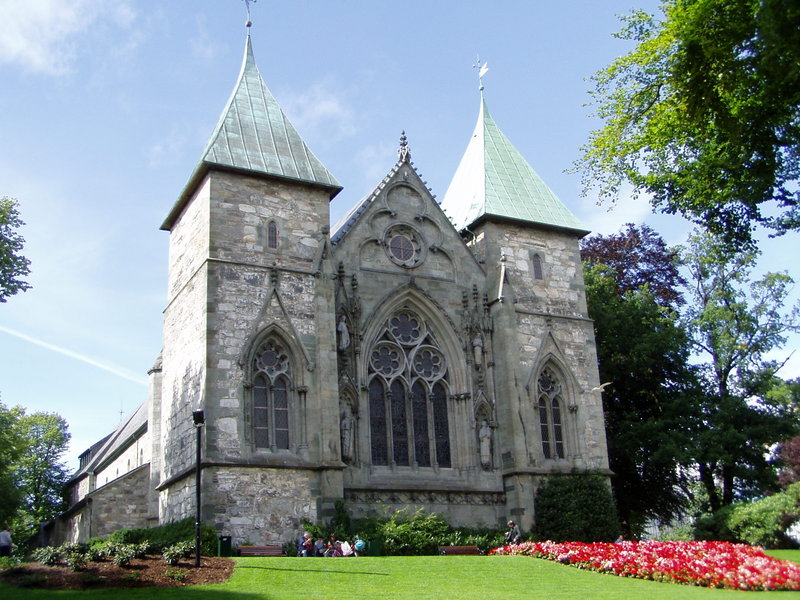
Rear view (east end)

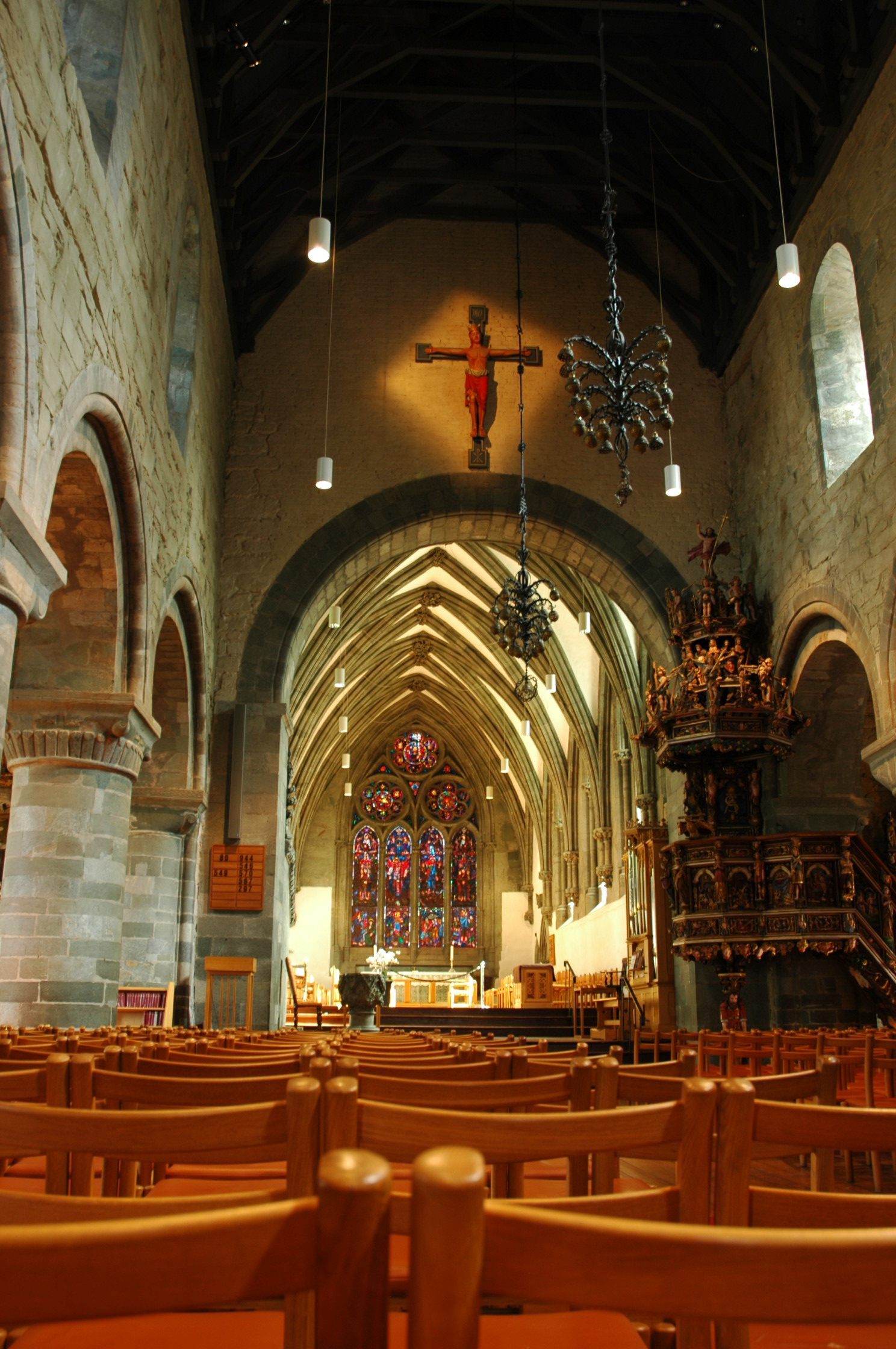
Nave

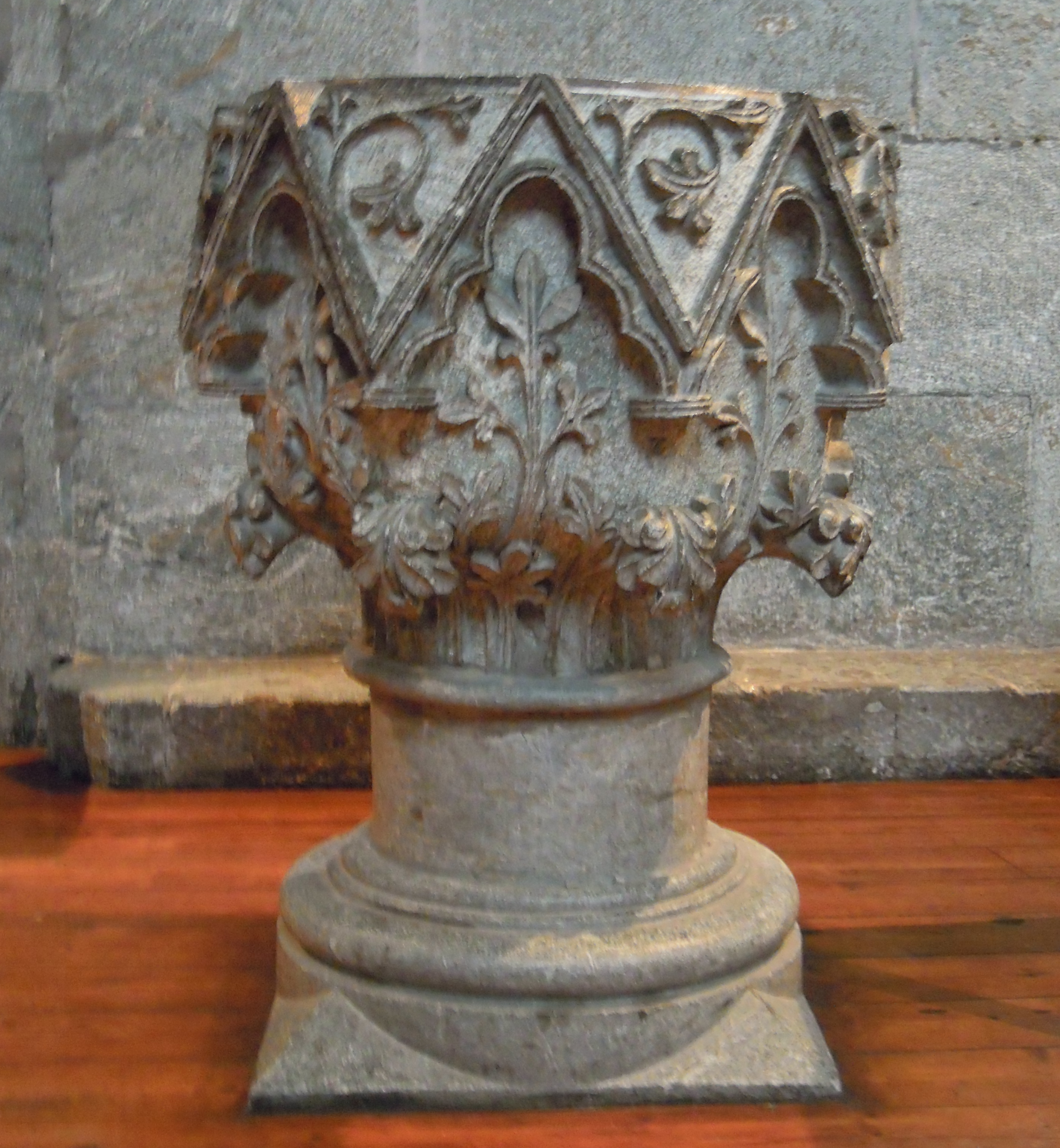
Baptismal font

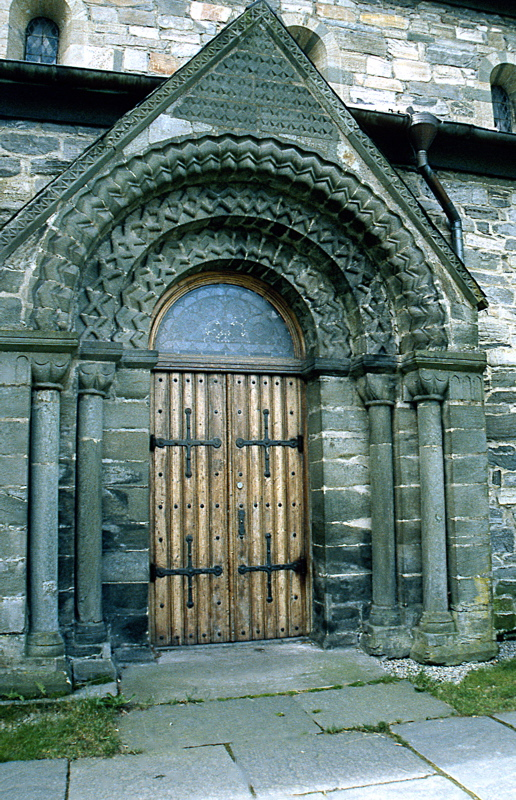
Doorway on the south side

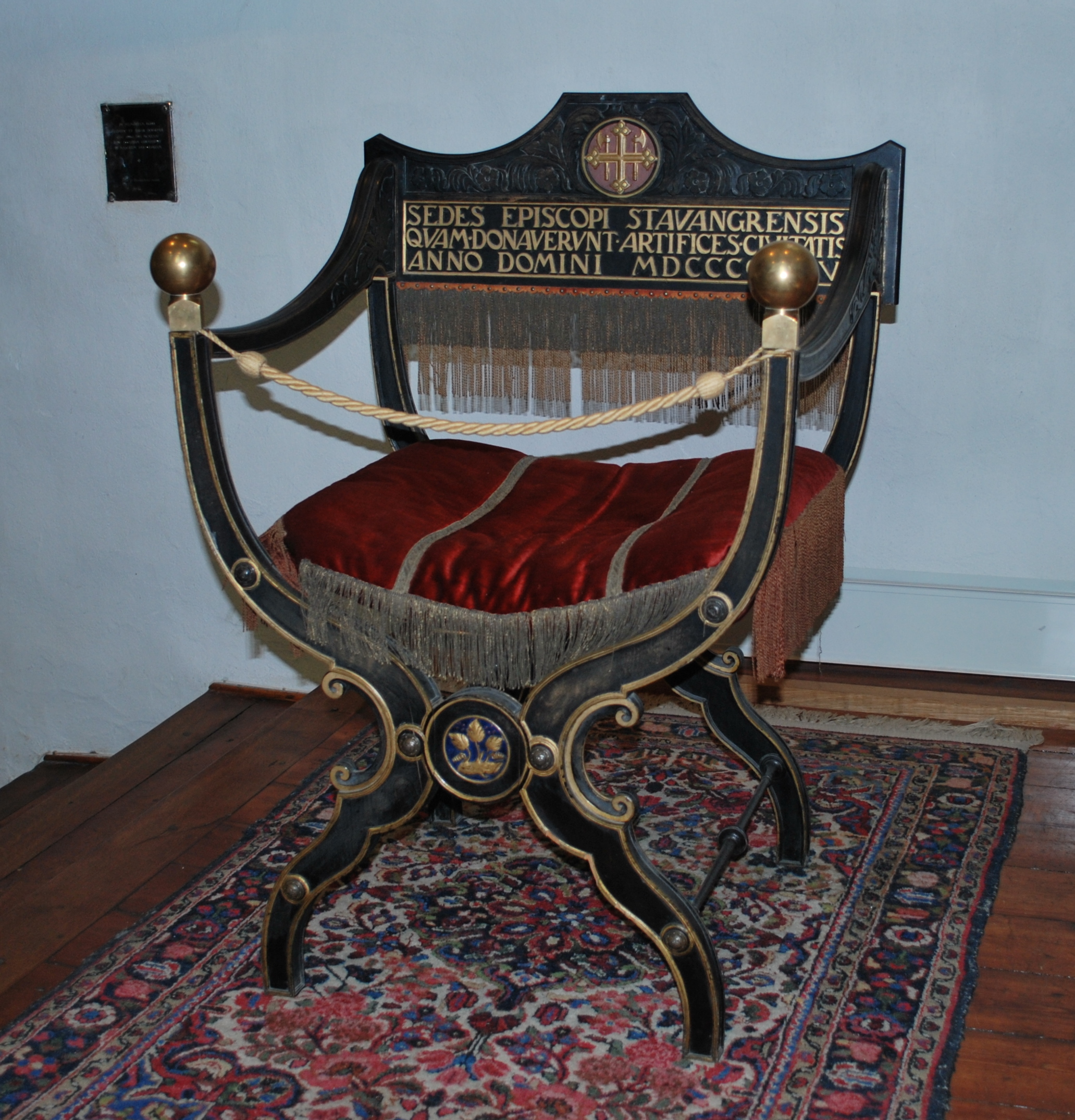
Bishop’s Chair

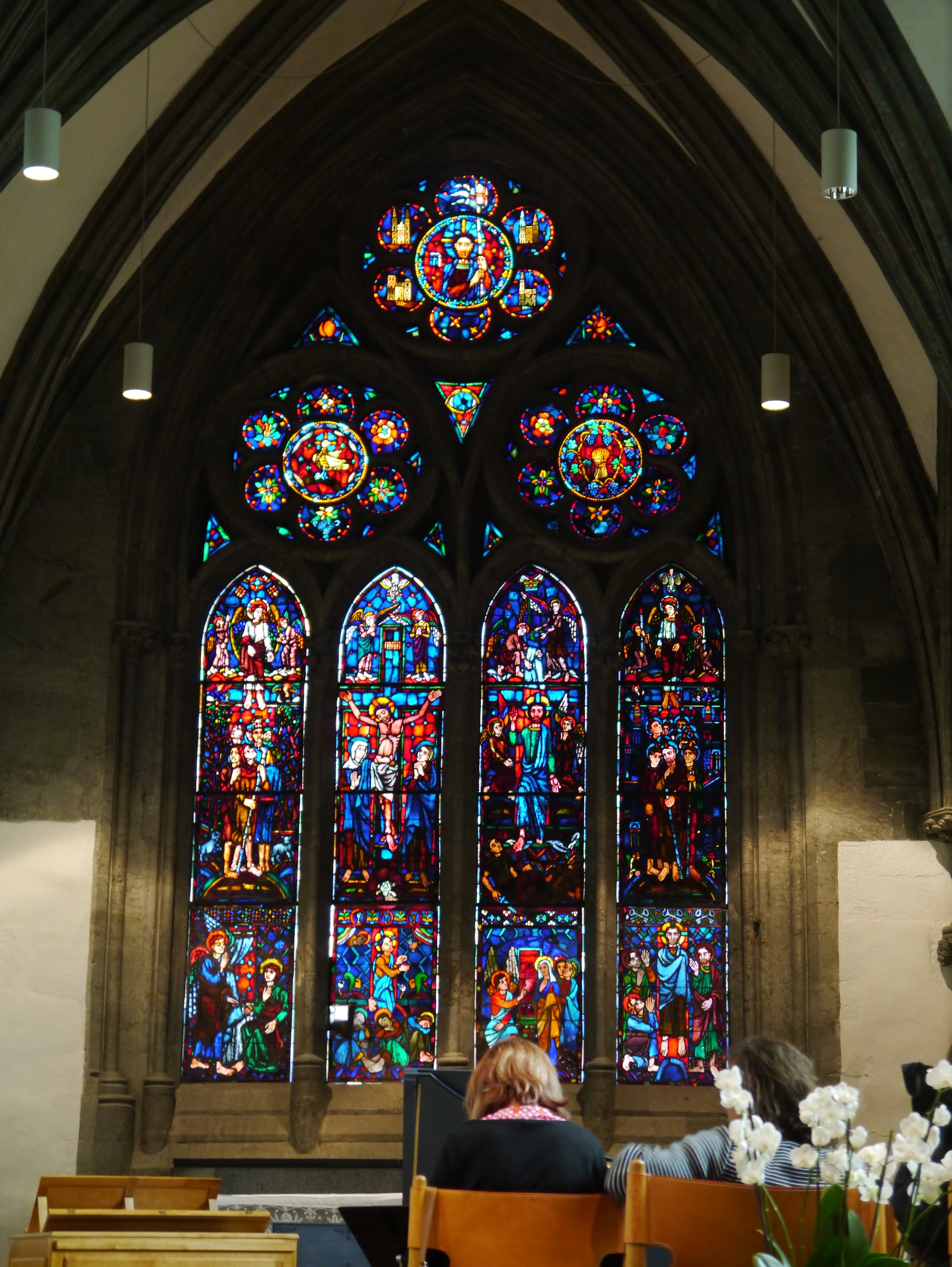
Choir window

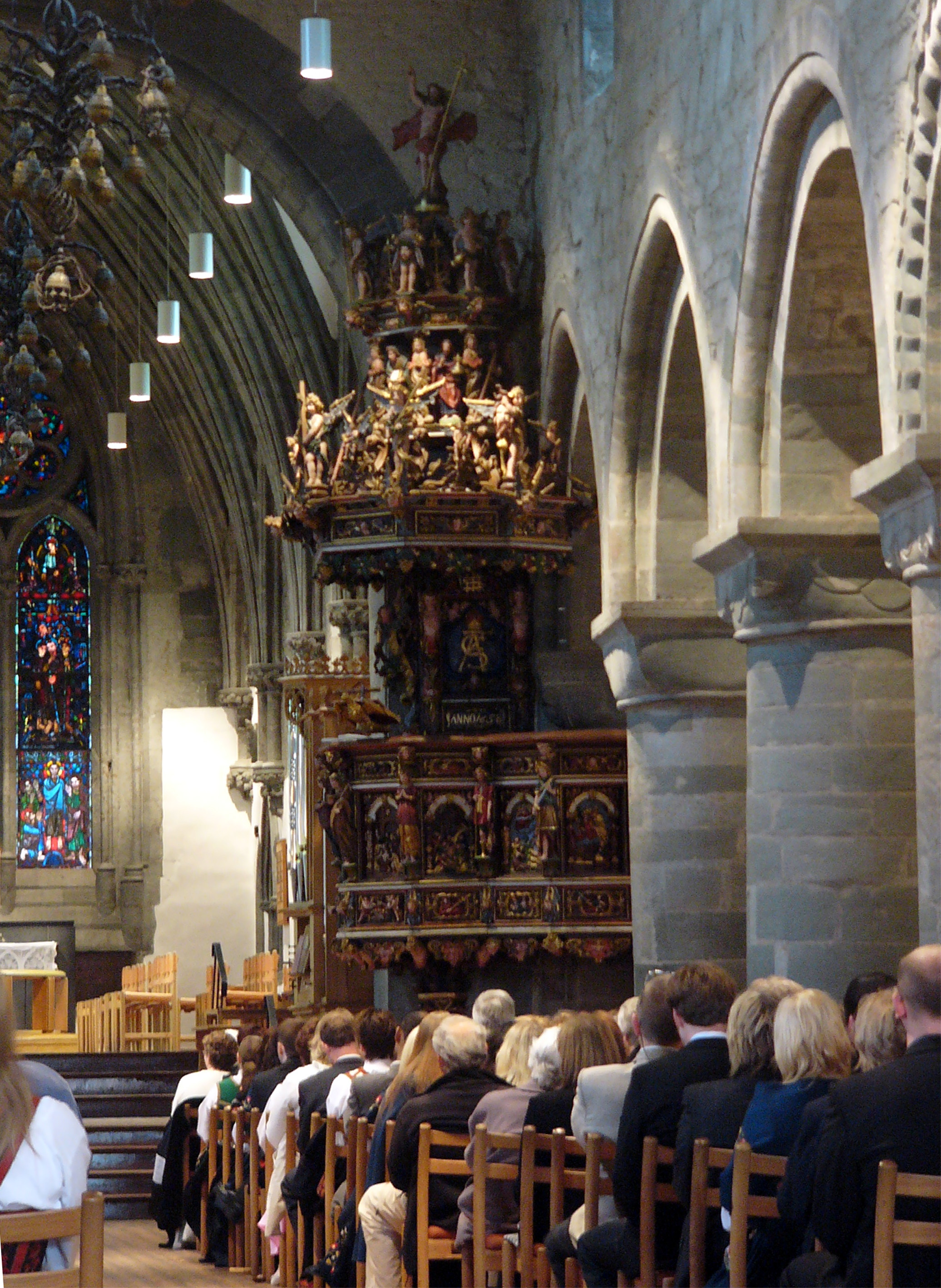
Pulpit

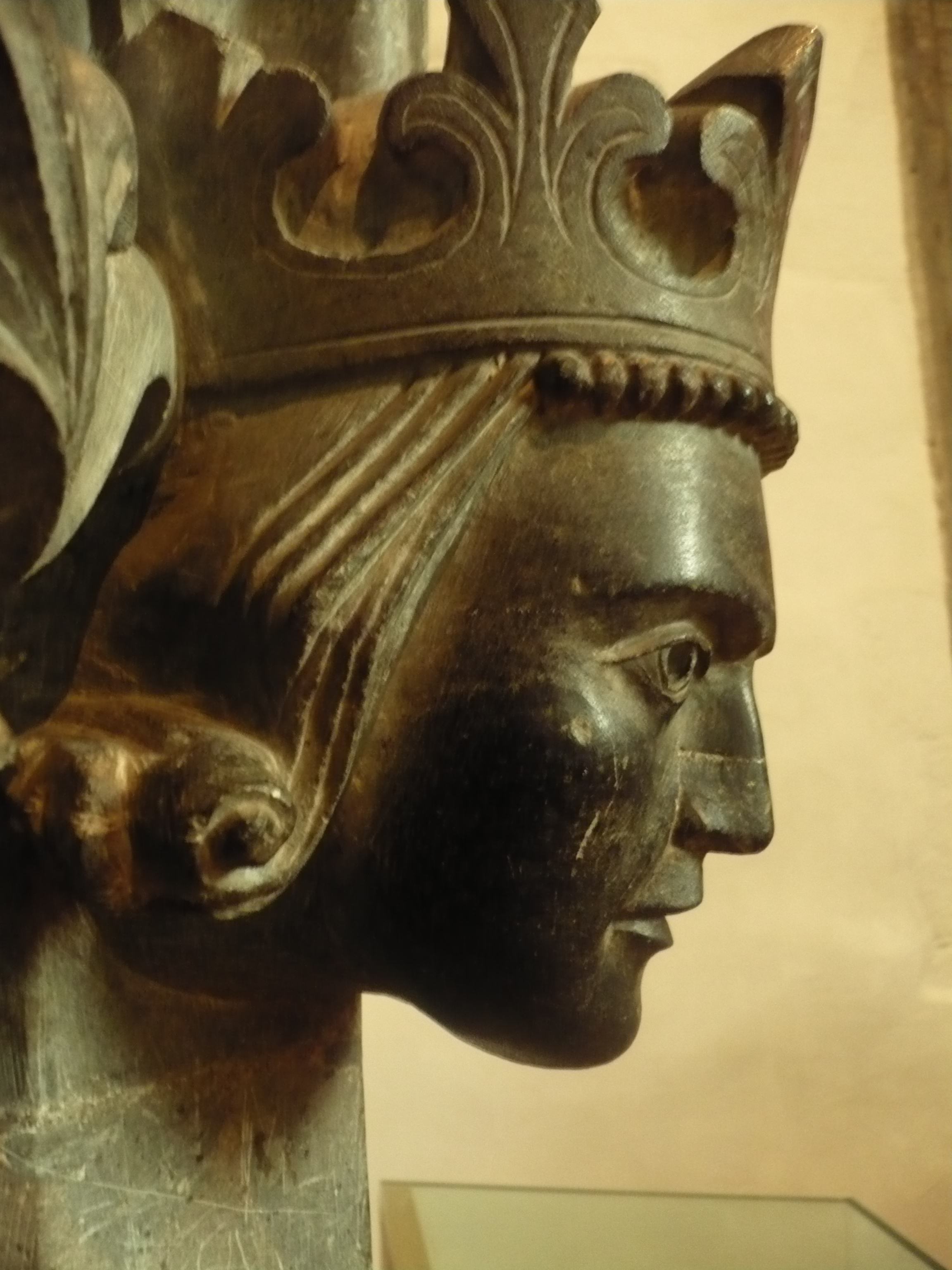
Bust of King Eric II

== See also ==
- List of bishops of Stavanger
- List of cathedrals in Norway
- Ancient Diocese of Stavanger
- List of churches in Rogaland

== Related reading ==
- Hoftun, Oddgeir (2008). Kristningsprosessens og herskermaktens ikonografi i nordisk middelalder (in Norwegian). Oslo: Solum forlag. ISBN 9788256016198.
- Ekroll, Øystein; Stige, Morten (2000). Middelalder i Stein. Oslo: ARFO. ISBN 8291399093.
