= Andrew Lawrenceson Smith =

British artist and painter

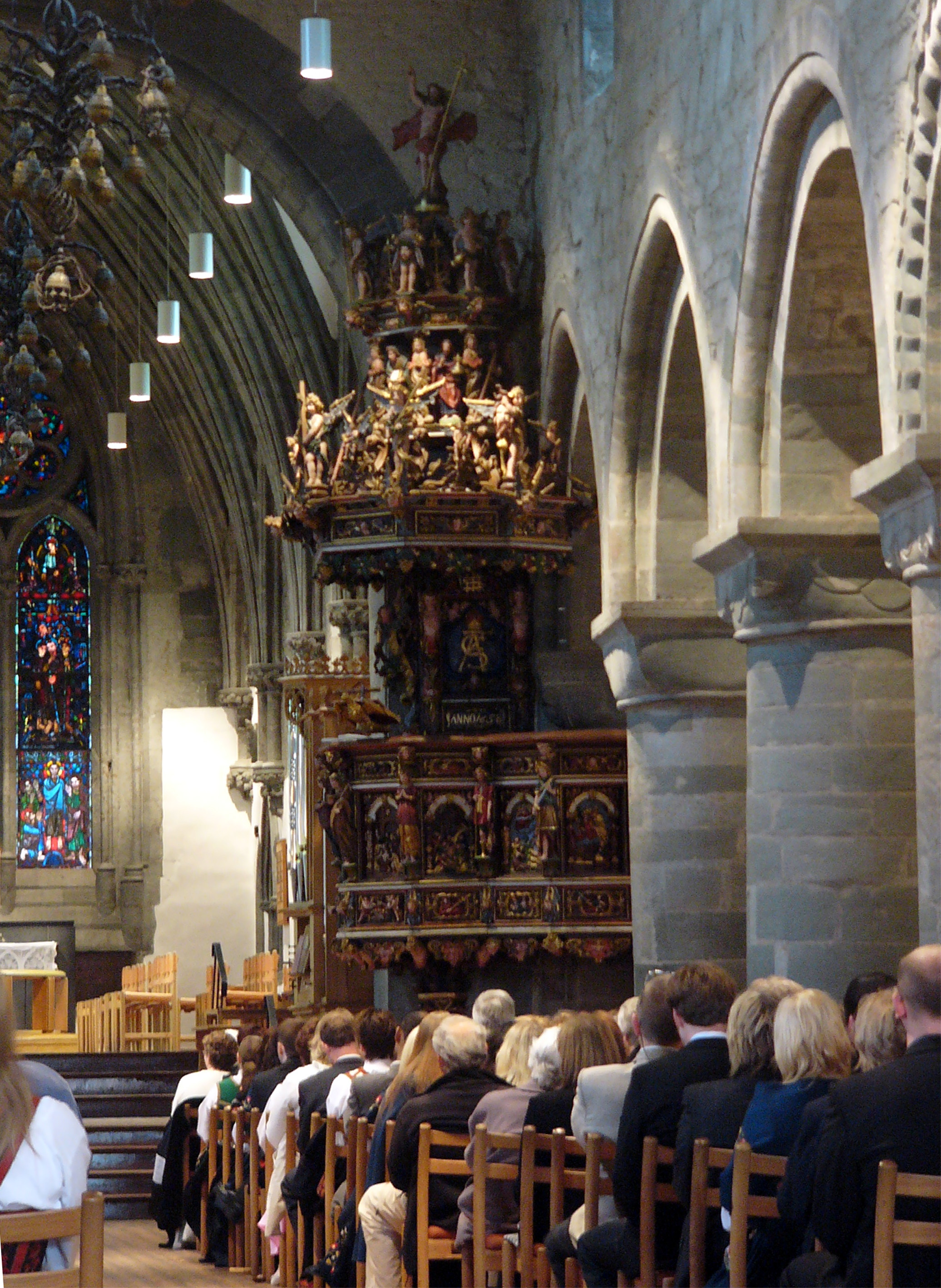
Pulpit in Stavanger Cathedral

Andrew Lawrenceson Smith, also known as Anders Lauritzen Smith (born in Braco ca. 1620, dead ca. 1694 in Stavanger), was a Scottish craftsman, woodcutter and painter. He was married to Maren Knudsdatter.

He is one of the most notable artists from the Stavanger renaissance, well known for his works in the Stavanger Cathedral. When he moved to Norway, he first settled in Bergen, but later moved to a farm in Jæren (present-day Sola Municipality) near Stavanger. Andrew Smith is seen as one of the leading representatives of the Cartilage baroque art period. It is known as Cartilage baroque because the woodcarvings resemble the curves in a human ear.

In the 1650s he was appointed to make a new pulpit for Stavanger Cathedral. The impressive pulpit was finished in 1658 and is seen as one of the more significant art works in Norway from the Cartilage baroque art period. He also created the five epitaphs for some of the priests and their families, in the nave and aisle of the medieval cathedral. He also created a number of important works of Christian art and church art in the Stavanger Region of Norway.

== Related reading ==
- Platou, Dorothea S. (1928) Anders L. Smith : en norsk billedskjærer fra 1600 årene (Stavanger : Dreyers grafiske anstalt)
