= Utsira =

Utsira (or historically Utsire or Udsire) may refer to:

== Places in Norway ==
- Utsira Municipality, a municipality in Rogaland county, Norway
- Utsira (island), an island in Rogaland county
- Utsira Church, a church in Utsira Municipality, Rogaland county
- Utsira Lighthouse, a lighthouse on the island of Utsira in Rogaland county
- Utsira (Svalbard), an islet in the Svalbard archipelago in northern Norway

== Other uses ==
- HNoMS Utsira (S301), several submarines of the Royal Norwegian Navy
- Rutebåten Utsira, a ferry company in Rogaland county, Norway
