= Aasa Helgesen =

Norwegian midwife and politician

- Born: 11 February 1877; Bjelland Municipality, Norway
- Died: 29 April 1968 (aged 91)
- Occupation: Midwife
- Years active: 1903–1942
- Known for: Serving as mayor of Utsira Municipality from 1926 to 1928, she was the first female mayor in Norway.

Aasa Helgesen born Aasa Røinesdal (11 February 1877 – 29 April 1968) was a Norwegian midwife and politician. She served as mayor of Utsira Municipality from 1926 to 1928, and was the first female mayor in Norway. She worked as a midwife in Utsira from 1903 to 1942.

== Early years, family and midwife career ==
Born at a small croft (Norwegian: husmannsplass) Røinesdal in Bjelland Municipality in Southern Norway, she started working as a servant girl after finishing primary school. Wanting further education, she obtained a loan from a farmer she worked for and the local lensmann in order to go to Kristiania to become a midwife. Having finished the education in 1902, she got a position as midwife a year later at the small fishing island of Utsira in Western Norway. In 1907, she married local fisherman Sivert Helgesen.

Aasa and Sivert Helgesen had eight children. They had a farm and Aasa would take care of the farm work when Sivert was at sea. From 1903 to 1943, she assisted as midwife in about 400 births at Utsira, which was almost all the children born at the island during this period. The island did not have a doctor, so she also assisted with other health issues.

== Mayoralty ==
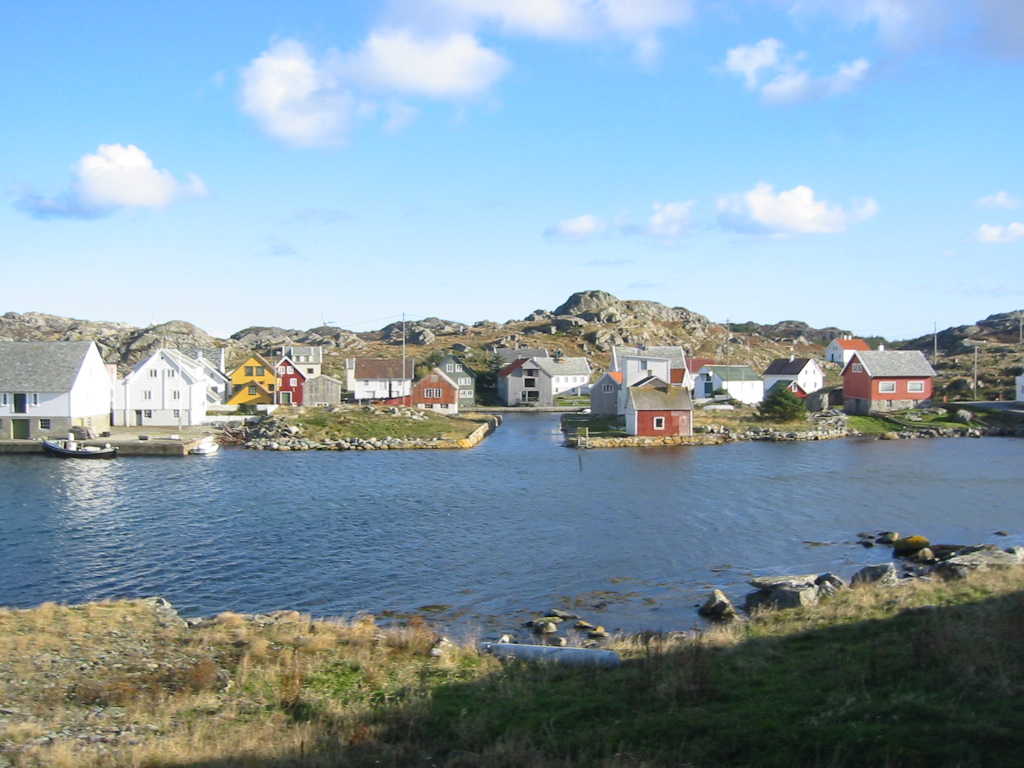
Utsira harbour

Utsira became a municipality when it was separated from Torvastad Municipality in 1925. An interim municipal council was elected and Aasa's husband Sivert Helgesen was elected interim mayor of the new municipality. The first municipal election for Utsira was held on 29 October 1925. The election system was such that the person with most votes would be elected. This election was only ten years after the law was changed to allow both men and women to vote if they were more than 25 years old. The members of the interim council expected to be elected without having their names on a list. Radio assistant Reidar Nordås did however put up a list of eleven unsuspecting women plus one man. Aasa Helgesen was one of the names on the list. Most or all of the women were wives of the men of the interim council. Neither Helgesen nor the other people on the list were aware of the new list until election day.

The election result showed that eleven women and one man had been elected to the municipal council, among them Aasa Helgesen. The municipal's country police inspector tried to have the election overturned, but the election board and the Norwegian Ministry of Justice confirmed the result.

The reason for the women's list and the election result has been somewhat unclear. It's considered that Nordås formed the list as a practical joke and he believed that the election result would be annulled. A local conflict related to tax issues between various families on the island is also believed to lie behind the result. Some families feared that the new municipal council would clamp down on tax evasion.

The only man who had been elected to the council declined to become mayor and Aasa Helgesen was chosen to become the first regular mayor of Utsira in 1926, taking over the position from her husband who had been interim mayor.

Locals were embarrassed by the election result; it was kept secret for about a week. When it was published it led to mockery in the local media who disparagingly referred to the council as the "skirt regime". The novel result was also reported internationally and Helgesen received congratulation telegrams from women's organizations in the US and Mexico.

The new council however performed well and caused no problems. The local media reported that the economic situation seemed fine. As mayor, Helgesen also participated in the higher Rogaland county council.

In the following election in 1928, neither Helgesen or any of the other women sought reelection. Sivert Helgesen succeeded his wife as mayor of the island.

== Legacy ==
After the eleven women resigned only one woman was elected, in 1980, to the municipal council of Utsira.

One of Helgesen's daughters was interviewed on TV in 1986. Asked if she felt proud when her mother became Norway's first female mayor, the daughter replied "Proud? No, it was such a shame."

Marte Eide Klovning became Utsira's second female mayor in 2012.

A bust of Aasa Helgesen was placed outside Utsira municipality hall in 1994.

In 2013, which marked the 100th anniversary for female voting rights in Norway, Haugesund Theatre in cooperation with Utsira municipality and Den kulturelle skolesekken (culture project for schoolchildren) performed a newly written play formed like a monologue called "The female coup on Utsira" about the event. The play was first performed on Utsira and later other places in Rogaland. A great-granddaughter of Aasa Helgesen played the role of Helgesen.
