= Lausingen =

Islet in Rogaland, Norway

- Interactive map of the island

Geography
- Location: Rogaland, Norway
- Coordinates: 59.27161°N 4.84824°E
- Archipelago: Utsira
- Area: 8,152 m^{2} (87,750 sq ft)
- Length: 130 m (430 ft)
- Width: 80 m (260 ft)
- Coastline: 358 m (1175 ft)

Administration
- Norway
- County: Rogaland
- Municipality: Utsira Municipality

Demographics
- Population: 0

Lausingen is a small, uninhabited islet in Utsira Municipality in Rogaland County, Norway. The island lies in the North Sea about 3 kilometres (1.9 mi) southwest of the main island of Utsira. It lies near the hamlet of Sørvik on the south side of the island of Utsira. The area is a region known for its scenic coastal landscapes.

== See also ==
- List of islands of Norway
