= Utsira Church =

Church in Rogaland, Norway

- Utsira kirke
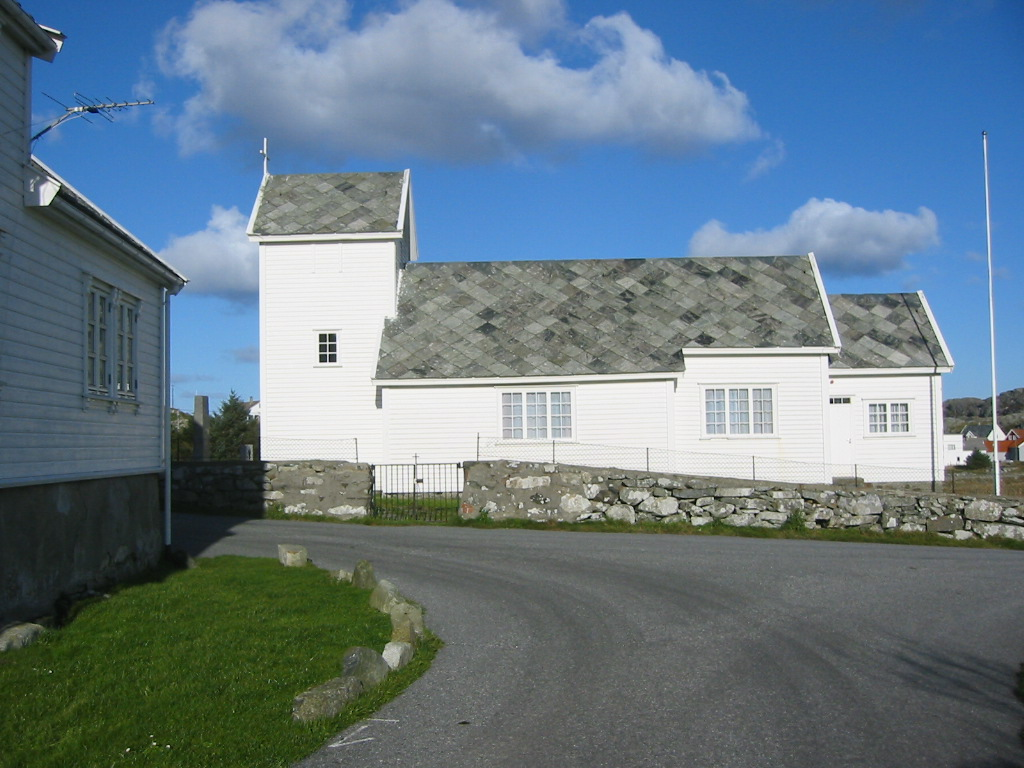
- View of the church
- Utsira Church
- 59.309451°N 4.88278°E
- Location: Utsira Municipality, Rogaland
- Country: Norway
- Denomination: Church of Norway
- Churchmanship: Evangelical Lutheran

History
- Status: Parish church
- Founded: Middle Ages
- Consecrated: 1785

Architecture
- Functional status: Active
- Architectural type: Long church
- Completed: 1785 (241 years ago)

Specifications
- Capacity: 100
- Materials: Wood

Administration
- Diocese: Stavanger bispedømme
- Deanery: Haugaland prosti
- Parish: Utsira
- Norwegian Cultural Heritage Site
- Type: Church
- Status: Automatically protected
- ID: 85734

Utsira Church (Norwegian: Utsira kirke) is a parish church of the Church of Norway in Utsira Municipality in Rogaland county, Norway. It is located on the small island of Utsira. It is the church for the Utsira parish which is part of the Haugaland prosti (deanery) in the Diocese of Stavanger. The white, wooden church was built in a long church style in 1785 using designs by an unknown architect. The church seats about 100 people.

== History ==
The earliest existing historical records of the church date back to around the year 1620, but it was likely built well before that time. According to some sources, an Irish hermit settled on the island in the Middle Ages built the first chapel on the island. In 1704, a major repair work took place, and from the description it appears that the church was then a small log building. In 1785, the old church was torn down and replaced by a new church, which mainly still stands. In 1954, the tower and sacristy were added to the building.

== See also ==
- List of churches in Rogaland
