= Utsira Lighthouse =

Coastal lighthouse in Norway

Utsira Lighthouse Utsira north tower
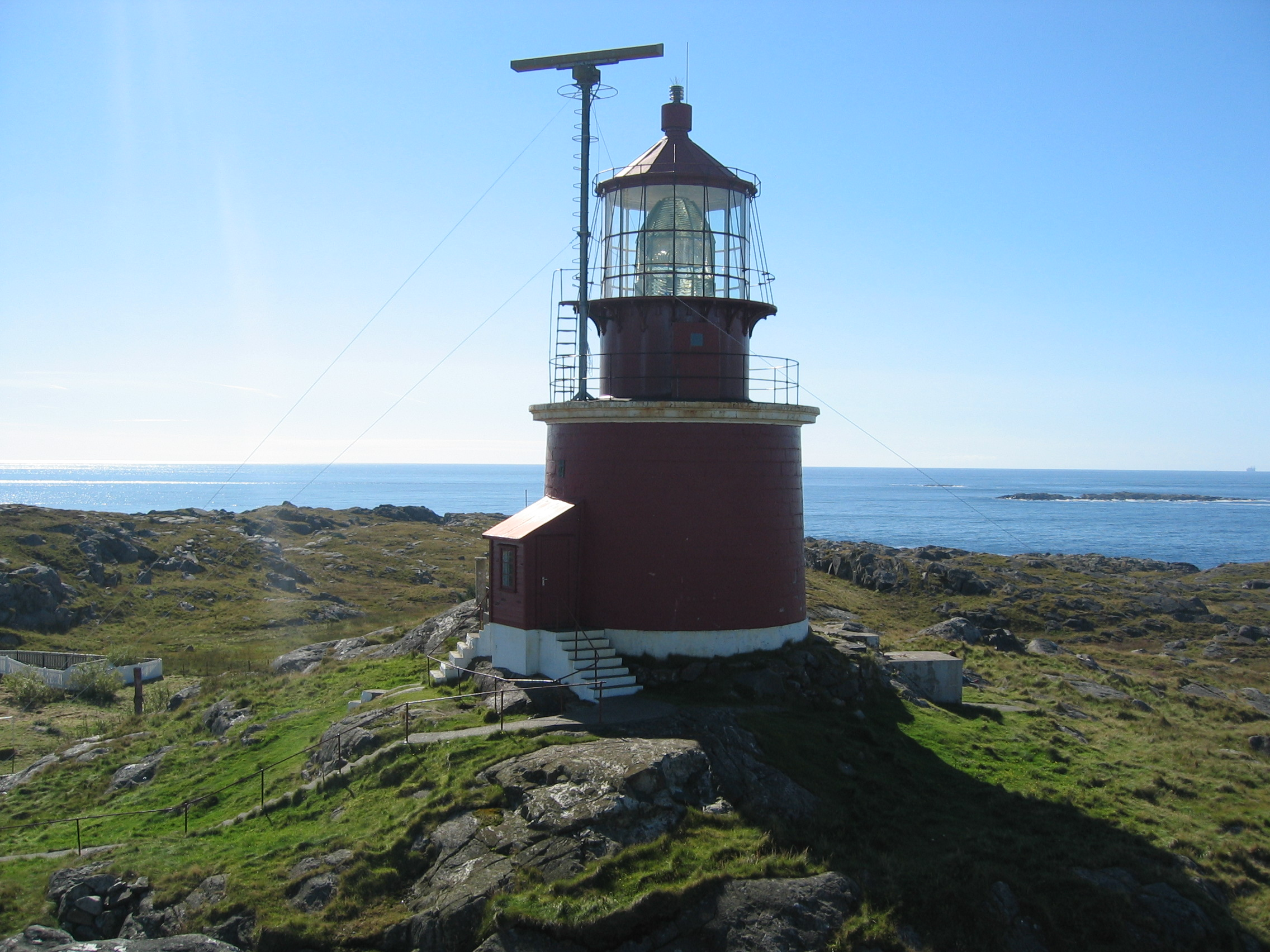
- View of the Utsira Lighthouse
- Location: Utsira Island, Rogaland, Norway
- Coordinates: 59°18′N 4°52′E

Tower
- Constructed: 1844
- Foundation: stone basement
- Construction: stone tower
- Automated: 2004
- Height: 13 m (43 ft)
- Shape: cylindrical tower with balcony and lantern
- Markings: red tower and lantern, white trim
- Heritage: cultural property

Light
- Focal height: 78 m (256 ft)
- Lens: 1st order Fresnel lens
- Intensity: 986,200 candela
- Range: 23 nmi (43 km; 26 mi)
- Characteristic: Fl(3) W 60s

Utsira Lighthouse (Norwegian: Utsira fyr) is a coastal lighthouse in Rogaland county, Norway. It sits on the western side of the island of Utsira in Utsira Municipality.

== History ==
The lighthouse was first lit in 1844, and listed as a protected site in 1999. At an elevation of 78.2 metres (257 ft), the lighthouse has the highest elevation of all the lighthouses in Norway. Originally, the lighthouse had a twin lighthouse located about 100 metres (330 ft) away. The twin lighthouses were used to distinguish it from other nearby lighthouses, but one of the two lighthouses was decommissioned in 1890. The functional lighthouse was automated in 1992 and de-manned in 2004. Since 2008, one of the lighthouse keeper's buildings has served as a tourist cabin.

The 13.3-metre (44 ft) tall round stone building is painted red with a white trim. At the top, there is a 1st order Fresnel lens which emits three white flashes every 60 seconds. The light has an intensity of 986,200 candela, and it can be seen for a distance of up to 23 nautical miles (43 km; 26 mi).

== Climate ==
Climate data for Utsira Lighthouse 1991–2020 (55 m, extremes 1867–present)
Month	Jan	Feb	Mar	Apr	May	Jun	Jul	Aug	Sep	Oct	Nov	Dec	Year
Record high °C (°F)	13.0 (55.4)	10.0 (50.0)	14.8 (58.6)	21.2 (70.2)	25.7 (78.3)	28.5 (83.3)	29.3 (84.7)	27.5 (81.5)	25.1 (77.2)	18.1 (64.6)	14.3 (57.7)	10.9 (51.6)	29.3 (84.7)
Mean maximum °C (°F)	8.1 (46.6)	7.3 (45.1)	8.5 (47.3)	13.6 (56.5)	18.3 (64.9)	19.3 (66.7)	21.9 (71.4)	21.7 (71.1)	18.6 (65.5)	14.4 (57.9)	11.2 (52.2)	9.1 (48.4)	24.1 (75.4)
Mean daily maximum °C (°F)	5.0 (41.0)	4.2 (39.6)	5.2 (41.4)	8.0 (46.4)	11.4 (52.5)	14.2 (57.6)	16.5 (61.7)	17.1 (62.8)	14.7 (58.5)	11.0 (51.8)	8.0 (46.4)	6.0 (42.8)	10.1 (50.2)
Daily mean °C (°F)	3.6 (38.5)	2.8 (37.0)	3.5 (38.3)	5.9 (42.6)	9.0 (48.2)	11.9 (53.4)	14.3 (57.7)	15.1 (59.2)	13.0 (55.4)	9.6 (49.3)	6.6 (43.9)	4.6 (40.3)	8.3 (46.9)
Mean daily minimum °C (°F)	2.0 (35.6)	1.2 (34.2)	1.9 (35.4)	4.1 (39.4)	7.0 (44.6)	10.1 (50.2)	12.6 (54.7)	13.4 (56.1)	11.4 (52.5)	8.1 (46.6)	5.1 (41.2)	3.0 (37.4)	6.7 (44.1)
Mean minimum °C (°F)	−2.3 (27.9)	−3.3 (26.1)	−2.2 (28.0)	0.3 (32.5)	3.2 (37.8)	6.9 (44.4)	9.8 (49.6)	10.2 (50.4)	7.8 (46.0)	3.8 (38.8)	0.3 (32.5)	−1.6 (29.1)	−4.4 (24.1)
Record low °C (°F)	−15.2 (4.6)	−15.5 (4.1)	−10.2 (13.6)	−6.2 (20.8)	−1.8 (28.8)	0.8 (33.4)	3.0 (37.4)	4.0 (39.2)	0.8 (33.4)	−2.0 (28.4)	−6.2 (20.8)	−12.6 (9.3)	−15.5 (4.1)
Average precipitation mm (inches)	132.9 (5.23)	103.1 (4.06)	93.7 (3.69)	65.0 (2.56)	54.6 (2.15)	63.4 (2.50)	83.9 (3.30)	115.4 (4.54)	121.6 (4.79)	148.6 (5.85)	146.6 (5.77)	130.5 (5.14)	1,259.3 (49.58)
Average extreme snow depth cm (inches)	3 (1.2)	5 (2.0)	3 (1.2)	0 (0)	0 (0)	0 (0)	0 (0)	0 (0)	0 (0)	0 (0)	0 (0)	3 (1.2)	10 (3.9)
Average precipitation days (≥ 1.0 mm)	19	16	15	13	11	11	11	14	15	18	19	18	180
Average relative humidity (%)	83	83	82	82	81	83	84	82	80	78	80	81	81
Average dew point °C (°F)	0.1 (32.2)	−0.3 (31.5)	0.9 (33.6)	3.1 (37.6)	5.6 (42.1)	9.0 (48.2)	11.6 (52.9)	11.8 (53.2)	9.7 (49.5)	6.1 (43.0)	3.3 (37.9)	1.8 (35.2)	5.2 (41.4)
Mean monthly sunshine hours	27.5	66.2	115.9	178.7	217.4	250.2	212.1	203.4	129.4	78.2	43.0	26.3	1,548.3
Source 1: Norwegian Meteorological Institute (extreme snow depth, dew point and humidity 1991-2020, sunshine 1952-1974 and extremes)
Source 2: NOAA WMO averages 91-2020 Norway

== See also ==
- Lighthouses in Norway
- List of lighthouses in Norway
