= Rutebåten Utsira =

Ferry company in Rogaland county, Norway

- Company type: Municipal owned
- Industry: Transport
- Founded: 1978
- Headquarters: Utsira Municipality, Norway
- Area served: Utsira
- Owner: Municipality of Utsira
- Number of employees: 14 (2025)

Rutebåten Utsira AS is a company that operates the ferry MS Utsira which runs between the town of Haugesund and the island of Utsira in Rogaland county, Norway. The company is owned by Utsira Municipality who took over operations in 1978. The current ferry was delivered in 2005; the crossing takes 70 minutes with four scheduled round trips per day on contract with Kolumbus.
