= Marte Eide Klovning =

Norwegian politician (born 1983)

Marte Eide Klovning (born 13 October 1983) is a Norwegian politician for the Labour Party.

She served as deputy mayor of Utsira, Norway's smallest municipality, before ascending to mayor in 2012. She served as a deputy representative to the Parliament of Norway from Rogaland during the term 2021–2025.

Outside of politics, she works at Utsira's municipal library. She is married and has three children.
