= Utsira Municipality =

Municipality in Rogaland, Norway

Utsira Municipality Utsira kommune
- Municipality
- Utsire herred (historic name)
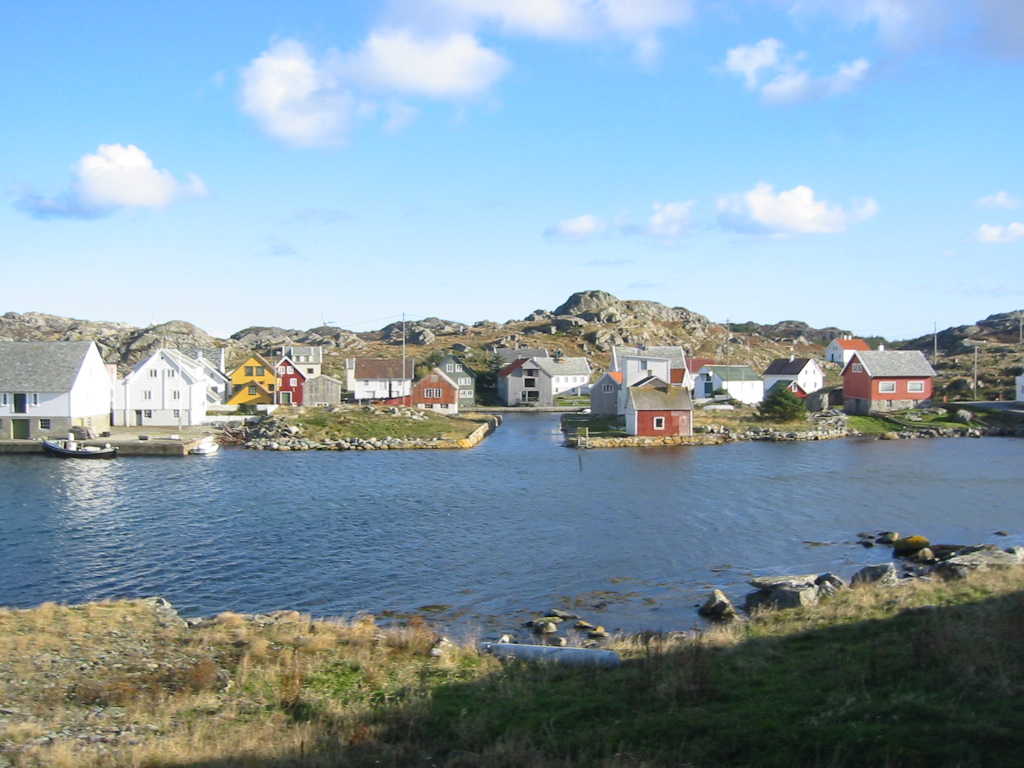
- View of the Utsira harbor

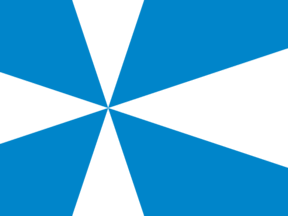
- Flag Coat of arms

- Rogaland within Norway

- Utsira within Rogaland
- Coordinates: 59°18′26″N 04°53′10″E
- Country: Norway
- County: Rogaland
- District: Haugaland
- Established: 1 July 1924
  - Preceded by: Torvastad Municipality
- Administrative centre: Utsira

Government
  - Mayor (2012): Marte Eide Klovning (Ap)

Area
  - Total: 6.29 km^{2} (2.43 sq mi)
  - Land: 6.27 km^{2} (2.42 sq mi)
  - Water: 0.02 km^{2} (0.0077 sq mi) 0.3%
  - Rank: #356 in Norway
- Highest elevation: 70.55 m (231.5 ft)

Population (2026)
  - Total: 219
  - Rank: #357 in Norway
  - Density: 34.8/km^{2} (90/sq mi)
  - Change (10 years): ▲ +9.5%
- Demonym: Sirabu

Official language
  - Norwegian form: Neutral
- Time zone: UTC+01:00 (CET)
  - Summer (DST): UTC+02:00 (CEST)
- ISO 3166 code: NO-1151
- Website: Official website

Utsira (pronounced [ˈʉ̌ːtˌsiːrɑ]) is the least populous municipality in Norway. The island municipality is located in northwestern Rogaland county, just off the western coast of Norway. Utsira is part of the traditional district of Haugaland.

The municipality consists of the main island of Utsira as well as several small, uninhabited outlying islands. Utsira Municipality is located in the North Sea, about 18 kilometres (11 miles) west of the island of Karmøy. All the residents (as of 2026) live on the main island of Utsira, where the administrative centre and Utsira Church are located.

The 6.29-square-kilometre (1,550-acre) municipality is the 356th largest by area out of the 357 municipalities in Norway, making it the second smallest municipality by area in Norway (after the nearby Kvitsøy Municipality). Utsira Municipality is the 357th most populous municipality in Norway with a population of 219, making it the smallest municipality in Norway by population, followed by Modalen Municipality. The municipality's population density is 34.8 inhabitants per square kilometre (90/sq mi) and its population has increased by 9.5% over the previous 10-year period.

== General information ==
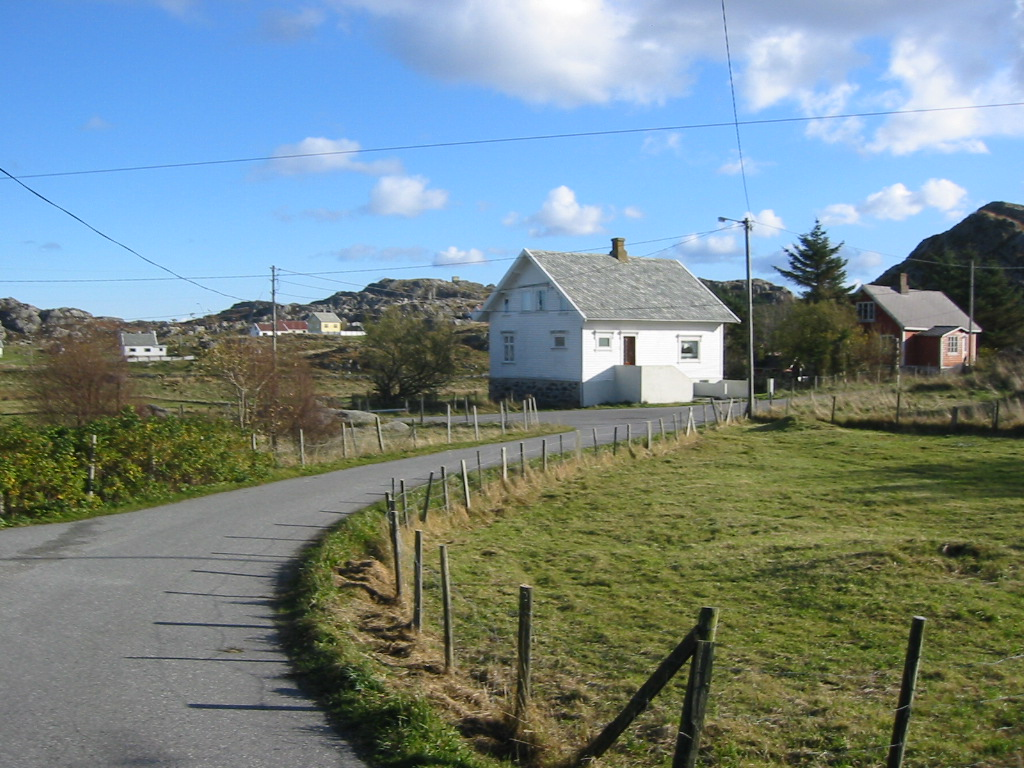
View of a house on Utsira

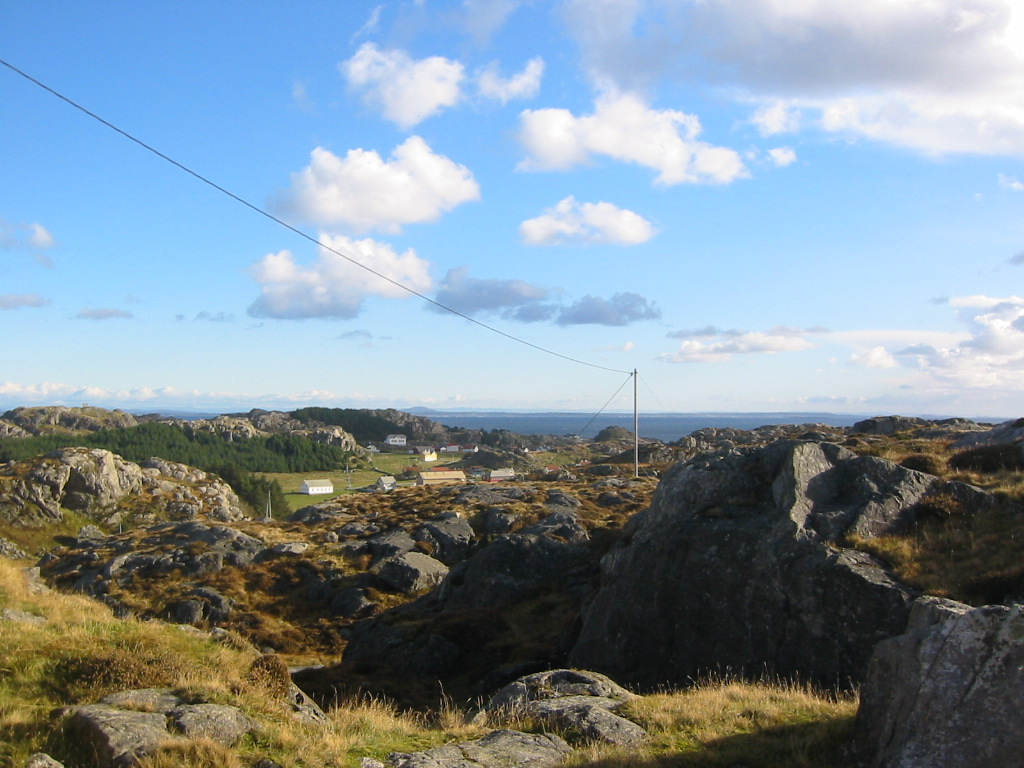
View of part of the island

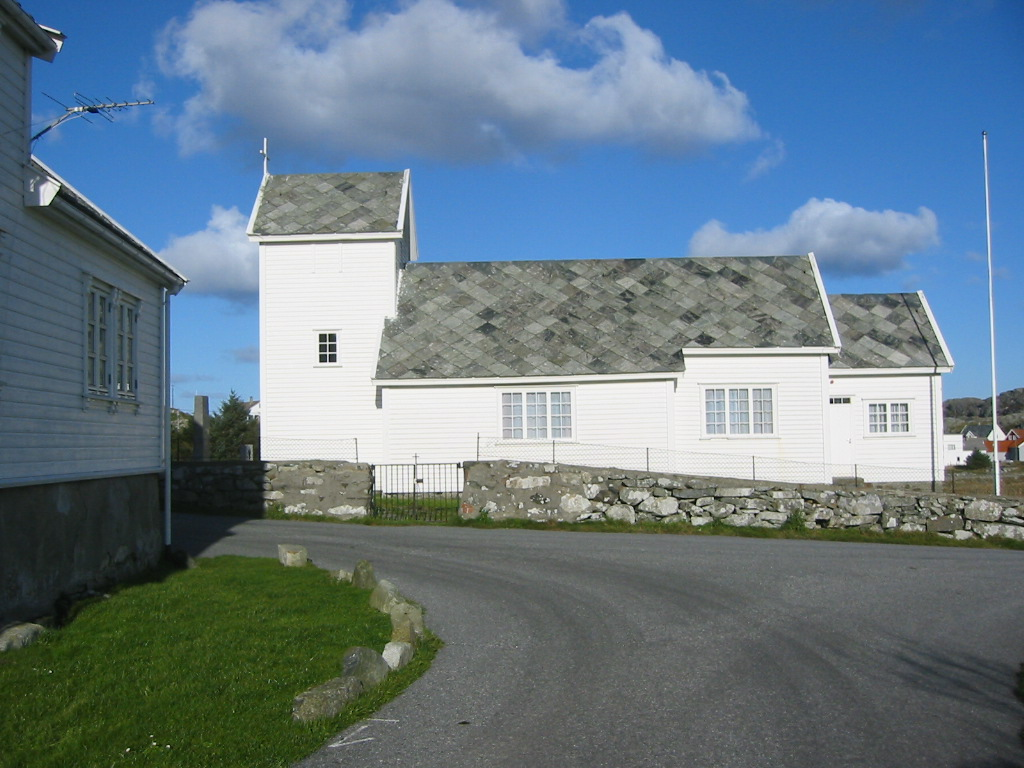
Utsira Church

The municipality of Utsira was established on 1 July 1924 when it was separated from Torvastad Municipality. Initially, Utsira Municipality had 414 residents. The municipal borders have not changed since that time.

=== Name ===
The municipality (originally the parish) is named after the island of Utsira which makes up the vast majority of the municipality. The Old Norse forms of the island's name was just Old Norse: Síri (nominative case) or Síra (genitive case). The first element, út which means "out" or "offshore", was added during the 16th century (compare the "Out Skerries" in Shetland). The meaning of the last element is uncertain, but it may mean something like "strong stream". The inhabitants still call the island Sira (leaving off the ut prefix) and an inhabitant of the municipality is called a sirabu.

The Norwegian language has had several spelling reforms during the 19th and 20th centuries. Before 1875, the name of the parish was written "Udsire", from 1875 to 1924 it was spelled "Utsire", and since 1925 it has used the spelling "Utsira".

=== Coat of arms ===
The coat of arms was granted on 23 July 1982. The official blazon is "Azure, four piles issuant conjoined in cross argent" (Norwegian: I blått et kors dannet ved fire motstøtende sølv spisser). This means the arms have a blue field (background) and the charge is a set of four triangles whose points all meet in the centre, together making a cross shape. The charge has a tincture of argent which means it is commonly colored white, but if it is made out of metal, then silver is used. The design is meant to symbolize light beams flowing out of the Utsira Lighthouse which was built in the municipality in 1844. The municipality wanted to have the lighthouse on their arms since 1976, but no design they tried was approved by the government. Eventually, they hired John Digernes in 1980 to prepare a variant that could get approvaled. His design was approved in 1982. Since 2004 there have been wind turbines built in the municipality and the design of the arms is also seen to represent those with three wings and a tower. The municipal flag has the same design as the coat of arms.

=== Churches ===
The Church of Norway has one parish (sokn) within Utsira Municipality. It is part of the Haugaland prosti (deanery) in the Diocese of Stavanger.

Churches in Utsira Municipality
| Parish (sokn) | Church name | Location of the church | Year built |
|---|---|---|---|
| Utsira | Utsira Church | Utsira | 1785 |

== Transportation ==
The island municipality is only accessible by boat. There are roads on the island. A car ferry operated by Rutebåten Utsira runs four round-trips per day connecting the island to the island of Risøy in Haugesund Municipality. The trip takes about 70 minutes each way. There are ferry docks on the north and south side of the island. The northern port is more often used because the southern route takes a little longer; the southern is used if the weather demands. An ambulance helicopter can land at the football field in medical emergencies.

== Government ==
Utsira Municipality is responsible for primary education (through 10th grade), outpatient health services, senior citizen services, welfare and other social services, zoning, economic development, and municipal roads and utilities. The municipality is governed by a municipal council of directly elected representatives. The mayor is indirectly elected by a vote of the municipal council. The municipality is under the jurisdiction of the Haugaland og Sunnhordland District Court and the Gulating Court of Appeal.

=== Municipal council ===
The municipal council (Kommunestyre) of Utsira Municipality is made up of 11 representatives that are elected to four-year terms. The tables below show the current and historical composition of the council by political party.

Utsira kommunestyre 2023–2027
| Party name (in Norwegian) | Number of representatives |
|---|---|
| Utsira List (Utsiralista) | 8 |
| Utsira Local List (Utsira Bygdeliste) | 3 |
| Total number of members: | 11 |

Utsira kommunestyre 2019–2023
| Party name (in Norwegian) | Number of representatives |
|---|---|
| Utsira Common List (Utsira Fellesliste) | 8 |
| Utsira Local List (Utsira Bygdeliste) | 3 |
| Total number of members: | 11 |

Utsira kommunestyre 2015–2019
| Party name (in Norwegian) | Number of representatives |
|---|---|
| Utsira Common List (Utsira Fellesliste) | 6 |
| Utsira Local List (Utsira Bygdeliste) | 5 |
| Total number of members: | 11 |

Utsira kommunestyre 2011–2015
| Party name (in Norwegian) | Number of representatives |
|---|---|
| Utsira Common List (Utsira Fellesliste) | 9 |
| Youth list for Utsira (Ungdomslista for Utsira) | 2 |
| Total number of members: | 11 |

Utsira kommunestyre 2007–2011
| Party name (in Norwegian) | Number of representatives |
|---|---|
| Utsira common list (Utsira fellesliste) | 6 |
| Local list for Utsira (Bygdelista for Utsira) | 5 |
| Total number of members: | 11 |

Utsira kommunestyre 2003–2007
| Party name (in Norwegian) | Number of representatives |
|---|---|
| Labour Party (Arbeiderpartiet) | 6 |
| Local politics list (Lokalpolitisk liste) | 2 |
| Local list for Utsira (Bygdelista for Utsira) | 5 |
| Total number of members: | 13 |

Utsira kommunestyre 1999–2003
| Party name (in Norwegian) | Number of representatives |
|---|---|
| Labour Party (Arbeiderpartiet) | 4 |
| Cross-party list (Tverrpolitisk liste) | 9 |
| Total number of members: | 13 |

Utsira kommunestyre 1995–1999
| Party name (in Norwegian) | Number of representatives |
|---|---|
| Labour Party (Arbeiderpartiet) | 4 |
| Cross-party list (Tverrpolitisk liste) | 6 |
| Local list for Utsira (Bygdelista for Utsira) | 3 |
| Total number of members: | 13 |

Utsira kommunestyre 1991–1995
| Party name (in Norwegian) | Number of representatives |
|---|---|
| Labour Party (Arbeiderpartiet) | 4 |
| Cross-party list (Tverrpolitisk liste) | 5 |
| Local list for Utsira (Bygdelista for Utsira) | 4 |
| Total number of members: | 13 |

Utsira kommunestyre 1987–1991
| Party name (in Norwegian) | Number of representatives |
|---|---|
| Labour Party (Arbeiderpartiet) | 6 |
| Joint List(s) of Non-Socialist Parties (Borgerlige Felleslister) | 7 |
| Total number of members: | 13 |

Utsira kommunestyre 1983–1987
| Party name (in Norwegian) | Number of representatives |
|---|---|
| Labour Party (Arbeiderpartiet) | 3 |
| Conservative Party (Høyre) | 4 |
| Local list for Utsira (Bygdeliste for Utsira) | 6 |
| Total number of members: | 13 |

Utsira kommunestyre 1979–1983
| Party name (in Norwegian) | Number of representatives |
|---|---|
| Joint List(s) of Non-Socialist Parties (Borgerlige Felleslister) | 5 |
| Women's list (Kvinnelista) | 2 |
| Non-party list (Upolitisk liste) | 6 |
| Total number of members: | 13 |

Utsira kommunestyre 1975–1979
| Party name (in Norwegian) | Number of representatives |
|---|---|
| Christian Democratic Party (Kristelig Folkeparti) | 1 |
| Joint List(s) of Non-Socialist Parties (Borgerlige Felleslister) | 7 |
| Non-party list (Upolitisk liste) | 5 |
| Total number of members: | 13 |

Utsira kommunestyre 1971–1975
| Party name (in Norwegian) | Number of representatives |
|---|---|
| Local List(s) (Lokale lister) | 13 |
| Total number of members: | 13 |

Utsira kommunestyre 1967–1971
| Party name (in Norwegian) | Number of representatives |
|---|---|
| Local List(s) (Lokale lister) | 13 |
| Total number of members: | 13 |

Utsira kommunestyre 1963–1967
| Party name (in Norwegian) | Number of representatives |
|---|---|
| Local List(s) (Lokale lister) | 13 |
| Total number of members: | 13 |

Utsira herredsstyre 1959–1963
| Party name (in Norwegian) | Number of representatives |
|---|---|
| Local List(s) (Lokale lister) | 13 |
| Total number of members: | 13 |

Utsira herredsstyre 1955–1959
| Party name (in Norwegian) | Number of representatives |
|---|---|
| Local List(s) (Lokale lister) | 13 |
| Total number of members: | 13 |

Utsira herredsstyre 1951–1955
| Party name (in Norwegian) | Number of representatives |
|---|---|
| Local List(s) (Lokale lister) | 12 |
| Total number of members: | 12 |

Utsira herredsstyre 1947–1951
| Party name (in Norwegian) | Number of representatives |
|---|---|
| Joint List(s) of Non-Socialist Parties (Borgerlige Felleslister) | 3 |
| Local List(s) (Lokale lister) | 9 |
| Total number of members: | 12 |

Utsira herredsstyre 1945–1947
| Party name (in Norwegian) | Number of representatives |
|---|---|
| Local List(s) (Lokale lister) | 12 |
| Total number of members: | 12 |

Utsira herredsstyre 1937–1941*
| Party name (in Norwegian) | Number of representatives |
|---|---|
| Local List(s) (Lokale lister) | 12 |
| Total number of members: | 12 |
Note: Due to the German occupation of Norway during World War II, no elections were held for new municipal councils until after the war ended in 1945.

=== Mayors ===
The mayor (Nynorsk: ordførar) of Utsira Municipality is the political leader of the municipality and the chairperson of the municipal council. The following people have held this position:

- 1924–1925: Sivert Martin Helgesen
- 1926–1928: Aasa Helgesen
- 1929–1931: Sivert Martin Helgesen
- 1932–1932: Mathias Larsen
- 1932–1940: Gudmund Klovning
- 1946–1951: Thorvald Austrheim
- 1951–1959: Thore Nordvik
- 1960–1975: Sverre Klovning
- 1976–1979: Hersleb Helgesen
- 1980–1991: Torbjørn Rasmussen
- 1992–2003: Reidar Klovning
- 2004–2007: Geir Helge Rasmussen (Sp)
- 2008–2011: Jarle Nilsen (Ap)
- 2012–present: Marte Eide Klovning (Ap)

== History ==
There are remains from the Stone Age on the island. It has been populated since that time. Historically, the island was governed by Torvastad, based on the mainland, but on 1 July 1924 the island was separated and it was established as a separate municipality. At that time, a new municipal council was to be elected. It was intended that the twelve men on the interim council would be elected, but the official list of candidates listed eleven women and a man. This was not known to even the people involved until the day of the election and by then it was too late. Despite a legal challenge the twelve were elected and Aasa Helgesen, the local midwife, was elected the second Mayor of Utsira and the first female mayor in Norway. Helgesen was a successful Mayor until 1928.

In 2004, Norsk Hydro installed a combined wind-hydrogen utility on Utsira. It is a full scale pilot project for energy self-sufficiency for a remote community. In periods when there is surplus wind energy, the excess power will be used for generating hydrogen by electrolysis. The hydrogen is stored, and is available for power generation in periods where there is little wind. Additional to this an energy storing flywheel exists to help out when for a short time more power is needed.

== Geography ==
The municipality consists of the main island of Utsira as well as several small, uninhabited outlying islands including Lausingen. Utsira Municipality is located in the North Sea, about 18 kilometres (11 miles) west of the island of Karmøy. The highest point in the municipality is the 70.55-metre (231.5 ft) tall hill on which the Utsira Lighthouse is located. Karmøy Municipality lies to the east and is the only neighboring municipality. The North Sea surrounds the municipality in all the other directions.

== Climate ==
Utsira has an oceanic climate (Köppen: Cfb) with cool/mild summers and chilly winters with lots of rainfall. The climate is mild for the latitude; average lows in winter remain above freezing. The island has significant seasonal lag with February–March typically being the coldest months of the year while August is the warmest. The maritime position also renders low diurnal variation in temperature between day and night. The driest season is April - July while the wettest season is August - January. October on average get nearly three times as much precipitation as May. The extreme temperatures in Utsira ranged from −15.5 °C (4.1 °F) on February 6, 1895 to 29.3 °C (84.7 °F) on July 17, 2003.

Climate data for Utsira Lighthouse 1991–2020 (55 m, extremes 1867–present)
| Month | Jan | Feb | Mar | Apr | May | Jun | Jul | Aug | Sep | Oct | Nov | Dec | Year |
|---|---|---|---|---|---|---|---|---|---|---|---|---|---|
| Record high °C (°F) | 13.0 (55.4) | 10.0 (50.0) | 14.8 (58.6) | 21.2 (70.2) | 25.7 (78.3) | 28.5 (83.3) | 29.3 (84.7) | 27.5 (81.5) | 25.1 (77.2) | 18.1 (64.6) | 14.3 (57.7) | 10.9 (51.6) | 29.3 (84.7) |
| Mean maximum °C (°F) | 8.1 (46.6) | 7.3 (45.1) | 8.5 (47.3) | 13.6 (56.5) | 18.3 (64.9) | 19.3 (66.7) | 21.9 (71.4) | 21.7 (71.1) | 18.6 (65.5) | 14.4 (57.9) | 11.2 (52.2) | 9.1 (48.4) | 24.1 (75.4) |
| Mean daily maximum °C (°F) | 5.0 (41.0) | 4.2 (39.6) | 5.2 (41.4) | 8.0 (46.4) | 11.4 (52.5) | 14.2 (57.6) | 16.5 (61.7) | 17.1 (62.8) | 14.7 (58.5) | 11.0 (51.8) | 8.0 (46.4) | 6.0 (42.8) | 10.1 (50.2) |
| Daily mean °C (°F) | 3.6 (38.5) | 2.8 (37.0) | 3.5 (38.3) | 5.9 (42.6) | 9.0 (48.2) | 11.9 (53.4) | 14.3 (57.7) | 15.1 (59.2) | 13.0 (55.4) | 9.6 (49.3) | 6.6 (43.9) | 4.6 (40.3) | 8.3 (46.9) |
| Mean daily minimum °C (°F) | 2.0 (35.6) | 1.2 (34.2) | 1.9 (35.4) | 4.1 (39.4) | 7.0 (44.6) | 10.1 (50.2) | 12.6 (54.7) | 13.4 (56.1) | 11.4 (52.5) | 8.1 (46.6) | 5.1 (41.2) | 3.0 (37.4) | 6.7 (44.1) |
| Mean minimum °C (°F) | −2.3 (27.9) | −3.3 (26.1) | −2.2 (28.0) | 0.3 (32.5) | 3.2 (37.8) | 6.9 (44.4) | 9.8 (49.6) | 10.2 (50.4) | 7.8 (46.0) | 3.8 (38.8) | 0.3 (32.5) | −1.6 (29.1) | −4.4 (24.1) |
| Record low °C (°F) | −15.2 (4.6) | −15.5 (4.1) | −10.2 (13.6) | −6.2 (20.8) | −1.8 (28.8) | 0.8 (33.4) | 3.0 (37.4) | 4.0 (39.2) | 0.8 (33.4) | −2.0 (28.4) | −6.2 (20.8) | −12.6 (9.3) | −15.5 (4.1) |
| Average precipitation mm (inches) | 132.9 (5.23) | 103.1 (4.06) | 93.7 (3.69) | 65.0 (2.56) | 54.6 (2.15) | 63.4 (2.50) | 83.9 (3.30) | 115.4 (4.54) | 121.6 (4.79) | 148.6 (5.85) | 146.6 (5.77) | 130.5 (5.14) | 1,259.3 (49.58) |
| Average extreme snow depth cm (inches) | 3 (1.2) | 5 (2.0) | 3 (1.2) | 0 (0) | 0 (0) | 0 (0) | 0 (0) | 0 (0) | 0 (0) | 0 (0) | 0 (0) | 3 (1.2) | 10 (3.9) |
| Average precipitation days (≥ 1.0 mm) | 19 | 16 | 15 | 13 | 11 | 11 | 11 | 14 | 15 | 18 | 19 | 18 | 180 |
| Average relative humidity (%) | 83 | 83 | 82 | 82 | 81 | 83 | 84 | 82 | 80 | 78 | 80 | 81 | 81 |
| Average dew point °C (°F) | 0.1 (32.2) | −0.3 (31.5) | 0.9 (33.6) | 3.1 (37.6) | 5.6 (42.1) | 9.0 (48.2) | 11.6 (52.9) | 11.8 (53.2) | 9.7 (49.5) | 6.1 (43.0) | 3.3 (37.9) | 1.8 (35.2) | 5.2 (41.4) |
| Mean monthly sunshine hours | 27.5 | 66.2 | 115.9 | 178.7 | 217.4 | 250.2 | 212.1 | 203.4 | 129.4 | 78.2 | 43.0 | 26.3 | 1,548.3 |
Source 1: Norwegian Meteorological Institute (extreme snow depth, dew point and humidity 1991-2020, sunshine 1952-1974 and extremes)
Source 2: NOAA WMO averages 91-2020 Norway

=== Shipping forecast ===
Utsira (under the spelling Utsire) gives its name to "North Utsire" and "South Utsire", two of the sea areas of the British Shipping Forecast.

== Attractions ==
Utsira Lighthouse is the highest lighthouse light in Norway at 78.2 metres (257 ft) above mean sea level.

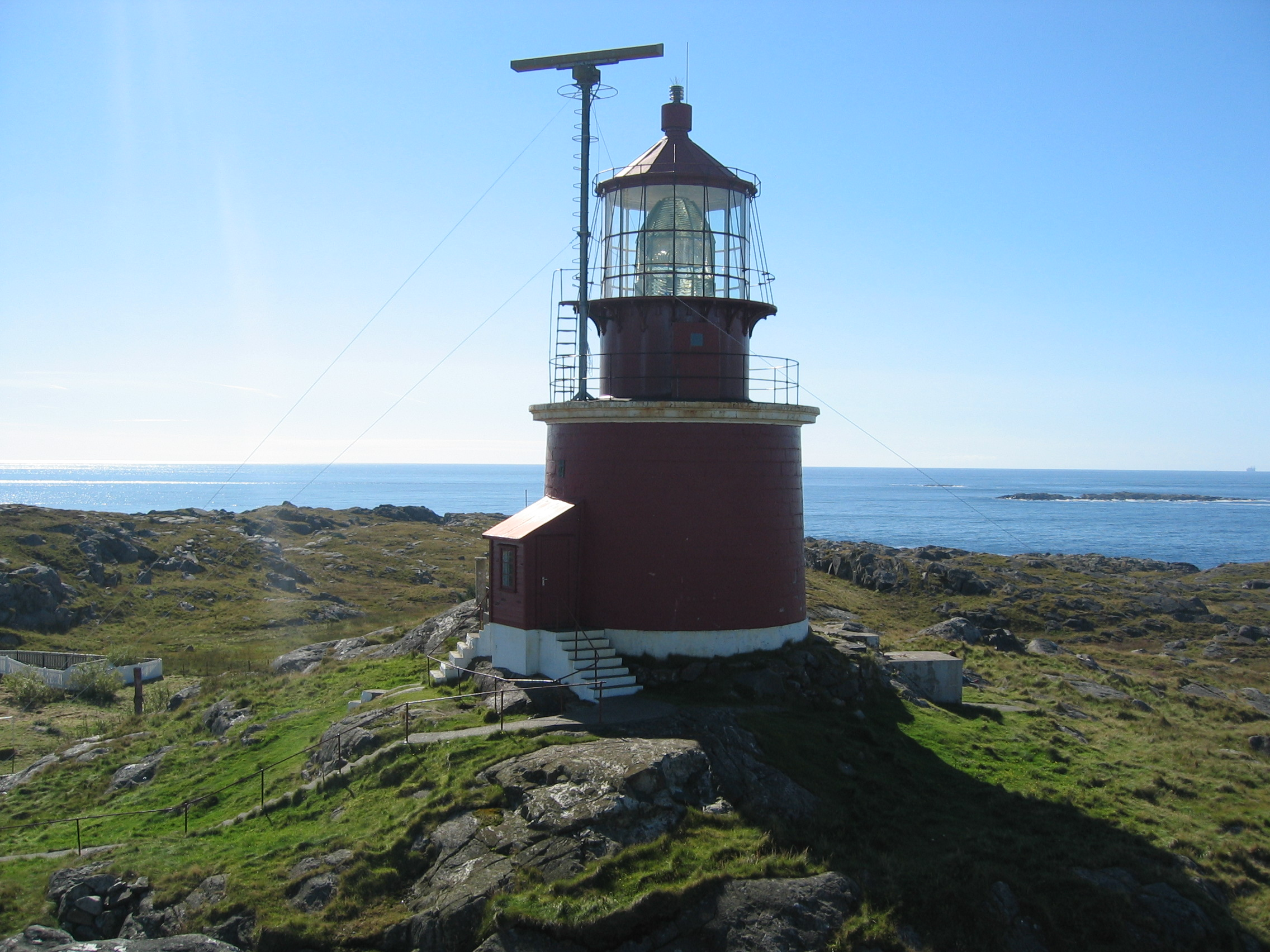
View of Utsira Lighthouse

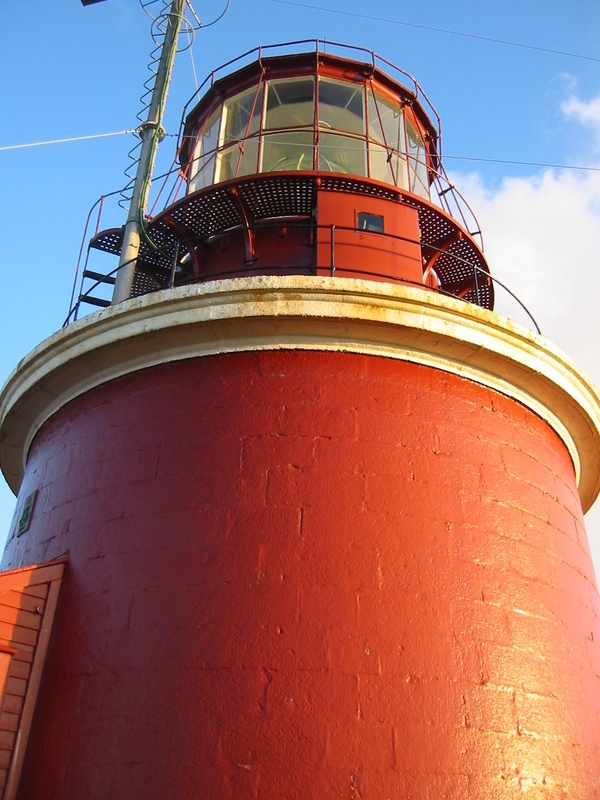
Lighthouse tower

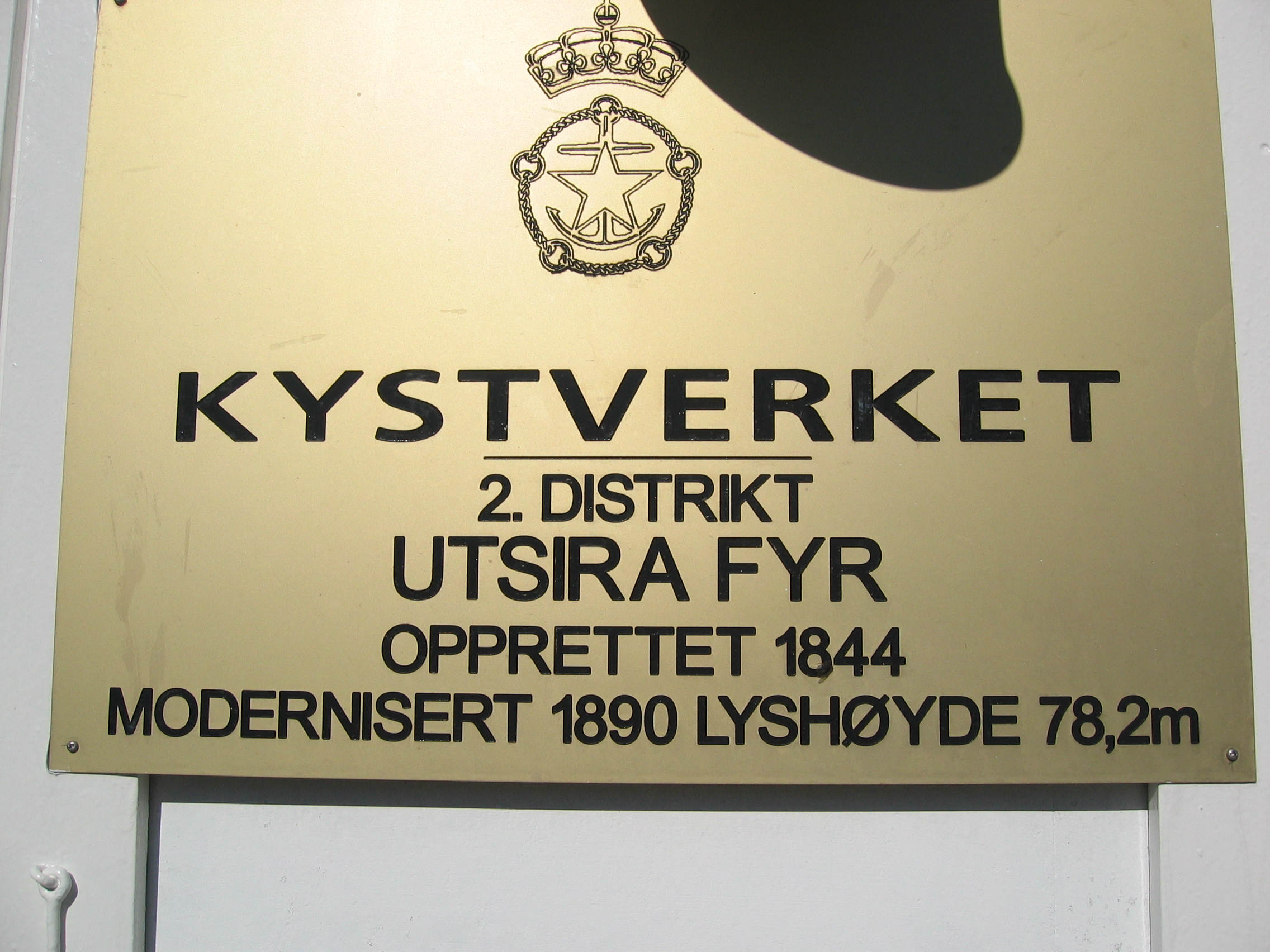
Utsira lighthouse sign

=== Birding ===
Utsira is known as the best birding site in Norway. There have been 317 different species recorded on Utsira, of which 23 are new to Norway.

== Notable people ==
- Aasa Helgesen (1877–1968), a Norwegian midwife (1903-1942) and politician who served as Mayor of Utsira (1926-1928), making her the first female mayor in Norway
