= Utsira (island) =

Island in Rogaland, Norway

Native name: Sira
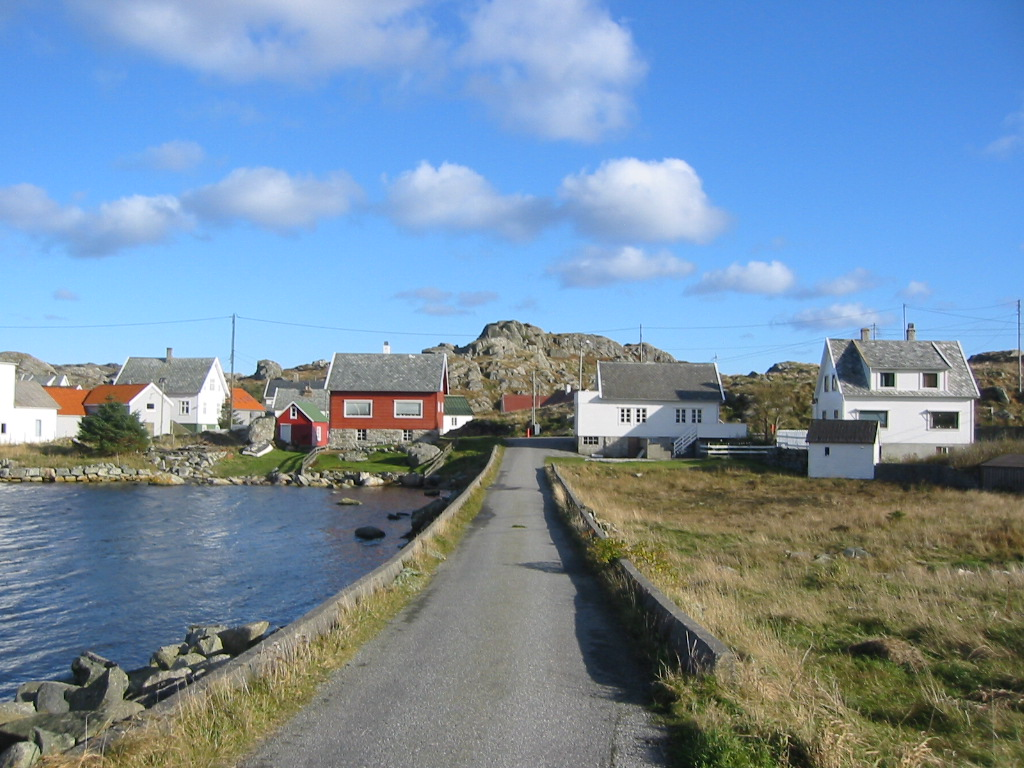
- View of the island
- Interactive map of the island

Geography
- Location: Rogaland, Norway
- Coordinates: 59.30812°N 4.88839°E
- Area: 5.9 km^{2} (2.3 sq mi)
- Length: 2.9 km (1.8 mi)
- Width: 3.4 km (2.11 mi)
- Coastline: 13 km (8.1 mi)
- Highest elevation: 71 m (233 ft)
- Highest point: Araseto

Administration
- Norway
- County: Rogaland
- Municipality: Utsira Municipality

Utsira (formerly known as Udsire and Utsire) is the main island in Utsira Municipality in Rogaland county, Norway. Utsira Church and Utsira Lighthouse are both located on the island. The small islet of Lausingen lies about 3 kilometres (1.9 mi) to the southwest of the island.

== Island ==
The 5.9-square-kilometre (2.3 sq mi; 1,500-acre) island makes up almost all of Utsira Municipality. The island lies about 18 kilometres (11 mi) west of the island of Karmøy, with the Sirafjorden lying between the two islands. The island's only connection to the mainland is by ferry, with four regular ferry routes connecting the island to the town of Haugesund each day. The ferries are operated by Rutebåten Utsira.

Most of the island's population lives in the central valley that runs north-south on the island. There are about 220 residents of the island as of 2026.

Utsira is known as the best birding site in Norway. There have been 317 different species recorded on Utsira.

The island gives its name to the BBC Shipping Forecast areas of "North Utsire" and "South Utsire" (the name of the island was spelled Utsire between 1875–1924).

== Climate ==
Utsira has an oceanic climate (Köppen: Cfb) with cool/mild summers and chilly winters with lots of rainfall. The climate is mild for the latitude; average lows in winter remain above freezing. The island has significant seasonal lag with February–March typically being the coldest months of the year while August is the warmest. The maritime position also renders low diurnal variation in temperature between day and night. The driest season is April - July while the wettest season is August - January. October on average get nearly three times as much precipitation as May. The extreme temperatures in Utsira ranged from −15.5 °C (4.1 °F) on February 6, 1895 to 29.3 °C (84.7 °F) on July 17, 2003.

Climate data for Utsira Lighthouse 1991–2020 (55 m, extremes 1867–present)
Month	Jan	Feb	Mar	Apr	May	Jun	Jul	Aug	Sep	Oct	Nov	Dec	Year
Record high °C (°F)	13.0 (55.4)	10.0 (50.0)	14.8 (58.6)	21.2 (70.2)	25.7 (78.3)	28.5 (83.3)	29.3 (84.7)	27.5 (81.5)	25.1 (77.2)	18.1 (64.6)	14.3 (57.7)	10.9 (51.6)	29.3 (84.7)
Mean maximum °C (°F)	8.1 (46.6)	7.3 (45.1)	8.5 (47.3)	13.6 (56.5)	18.3 (64.9)	19.3 (66.7)	21.9 (71.4)	21.7 (71.1)	18.6 (65.5)	14.4 (57.9)	11.2 (52.2)	9.1 (48.4)	24.1 (75.4)
Mean daily maximum °C (°F)	5.0 (41.0)	4.2 (39.6)	5.2 (41.4)	8.0 (46.4)	11.4 (52.5)	14.2 (57.6)	16.5 (61.7)	17.1 (62.8)	14.7 (58.5)	11.0 (51.8)	8.0 (46.4)	6.0 (42.8)	10.1 (50.2)
Daily mean °C (°F)	3.6 (38.5)	2.8 (37.0)	3.5 (38.3)	5.9 (42.6)	9.0 (48.2)	11.9 (53.4)	14.3 (57.7)	15.1 (59.2)	13.0 (55.4)	9.6 (49.3)	6.6 (43.9)	4.6 (40.3)	8.3 (46.9)
Mean daily minimum °C (°F)	2.0 (35.6)	1.2 (34.2)	1.9 (35.4)	4.1 (39.4)	7.0 (44.6)	10.1 (50.2)	12.6 (54.7)	13.4 (56.1)	11.4 (52.5)	8.1 (46.6)	5.1 (41.2)	3.0 (37.4)	6.7 (44.1)
Mean minimum °C (°F)	−2.3 (27.9)	−3.3 (26.1)	−2.2 (28.0)	0.3 (32.5)	3.2 (37.8)	6.9 (44.4)	9.8 (49.6)	10.2 (50.4)	7.8 (46.0)	3.8 (38.8)	0.3 (32.5)	−1.6 (29.1)	−4.4 (24.1)
Record low °C (°F)	−15.2 (4.6)	−15.5 (4.1)	−10.2 (13.6)	−6.2 (20.8)	−1.8 (28.8)	0.8 (33.4)	3.0 (37.4)	4.0 (39.2)	0.8 (33.4)	−2.0 (28.4)	−6.2 (20.8)	−12.6 (9.3)	−15.5 (4.1)
Average precipitation mm (inches)	132.9 (5.23)	103.1 (4.06)	93.7 (3.69)	65.0 (2.56)	54.6 (2.15)	63.4 (2.50)	83.9 (3.30)	115.4 (4.54)	121.6 (4.79)	148.6 (5.85)	146.6 (5.77)	130.5 (5.14)	1,259.3 (49.58)
Average extreme snow depth cm (inches)	3 (1.2)	5 (2.0)	3 (1.2)	0 (0)	0 (0)	0 (0)	0 (0)	0 (0)	0 (0)	0 (0)	0 (0)	3 (1.2)	10 (3.9)
Average precipitation days (≥ 1.0 mm)	19	16	15	13	11	11	11	14	15	18	19	18	180
Average relative humidity (%)	83	83	82	82	81	83	84	82	80	78	80	81	81
Average dew point °C (°F)	0.1 (32.2)	−0.3 (31.5)	0.9 (33.6)	3.1 (37.6)	5.6 (42.1)	9.0 (48.2)	11.6 (52.9)	11.8 (53.2)	9.7 (49.5)	6.1 (43.0)	3.3 (37.9)	1.8 (35.2)	5.2 (41.4)
Mean monthly sunshine hours	27.5	66.2	115.9	178.7	217.4	250.2	212.1	203.4	129.4	78.2	43.0	26.3	1,548.3
Source 1: Norwegian Meteorological Institute (extreme snow depth, dew point and humidity 1991-2020, sunshine 1952-1974 and extremes)
Source 2: NOAA WMO averages 91-2020 Norway

== See also ==
- List of islands of Norway
