= Ogna (disambiguation) =

Ogna may refer to:

== Places ==
- Ogna, a village in Hå municipality in Rogaland county, Norway
- Ogna (municipality), a former municipality in Rogaland county, Norway
- Ogna Church, a church in Hå municipality in Rogaland county, Norway
- Ogna Station, a railway station in Hå municipality in Rogaland county, Norway
- Ogna (river), a river in Steinkjer municipality in Trøndelag county, Norway
- Ogna or Oghna, a village in Jhadol tehsil, Udaipur district, Rajasthan, India

== People with the surname ==
- Giuseppe Ogna (1933–2010), Italian cyclist

== See also ==
- Villa d'Ogna, a municipality in Bergamo province, Lombardy, Italy
