= Ogna Municipality =

Former municipality in Rogaland, Norway

Ogna Municipality Ogna herred
- Former municipality
- Ogne herred (historic name)
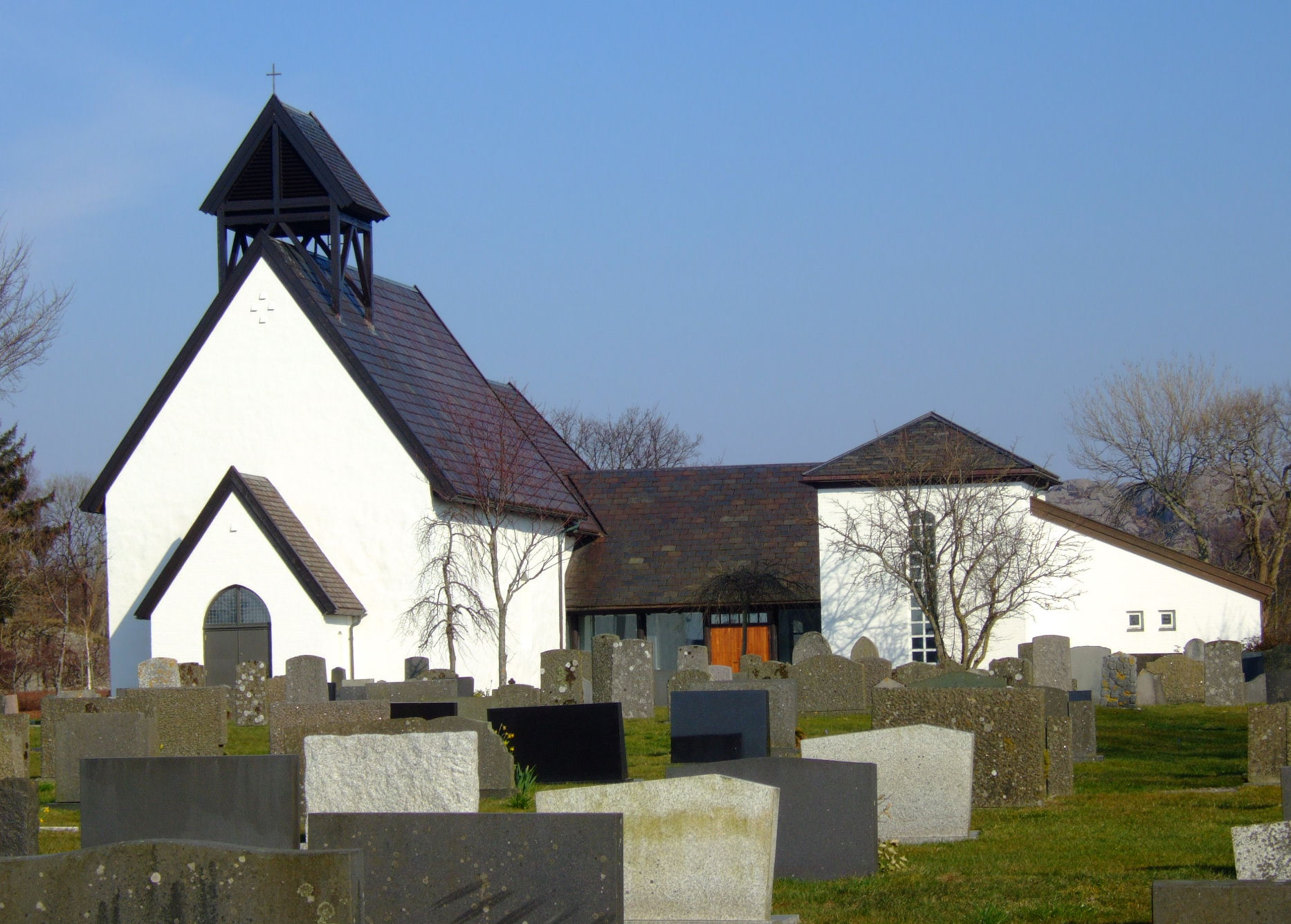
- View of the local Ogna Church

- Rogaland within Norway

- Ogna within Rogaland
- Coordinates: 58°30′56″N 05°48′29″E
- Country: Norway
- County: Rogaland
- District: Dalane
- Established: 1839
  - Preceded by: Eigersund Municipality
- Disestablished: 1 Jan 1964
  - Succeeded by: Hå Municipality
- Administrative centre: Ogna

Government
  - Mayor (1959–1964): Otto Kvalbein (LL)

Area (upon dissolution)
  - Total: 104.3 km^{2} (40.3 sq mi)
  - Rank: #512 in Norway
- Highest elevation: 416.1 m (1,365 ft)

Population (1963)
  - Total: 1,444
  - Rank: #545 in Norway
  - Density: 13.8/km^{2} (36/sq mi)
  - Change (10 years): ▲ +2.8%
- Demonym: Ognabu

Official language
  - Norwegian form: Neutral
- Time zone: UTC+01:00 (CET)
  - Summer (DST): UTC+02:00 (CEST)
- ISO 3166 code: NO-1117

Ogna is a former municipality in Rogaland county, Norway. The 104.3-square-kilometre (40.3 sq mi) municipality existed from 1839 until its dissolution in 1964. The area is now part of Hå Municipality in the traditional district of Dalane. The administrative centre was the village of Ogna where Ogna Church is located. Other villages in the municipality included Brusand, Hæen, and Sirevåg.

Prior to its dissolution in 1964, the 104.3-square-kilometre (40.3 sq mi) municipality was the 512th largest by area out of the 689 municipalities in Norway. Ogna Municipality was the 545th most populous municipality in Norway with a population of about 1,444. The municipality's population density was 13.8 inhabitants per square kilometre (36/sq mi) and its population had increased by 2.8% over the previous 10-year period.

== General information ==
The municipality of Ogne (later spelled Ogna) was established in 1839 when the (much larger) Egersund landdistrikt (the rural municipality surrounding the town of Egersund) was divided. The northwestern district (population: 825) became the new Ogne Municipality and the rest (population: 2,016) remained as Egersund landdistrikt.

During the 1960s, there were many municipal mergers across Norway due to the work of the Schei Committee. On 1 January 1964, the following areas were merged to form the new Hå Municipality:

- all of Nærbø Municipality (population: 3,926)
- all of Ogna Municipality (population: 1,470)
- all of Varhaug Municipality (population: 3,454)

=== Name ===
The municipality (originally the parish) is named after the old Ogna farm (Old Norse: Ógna) since the first Ogna Church was built there. The name comes from the verb ógna which means "to threaten", likely referring to the local river since it has strong currents and it is prone to flooding in the spring.

Historically, the name of the municipality was spelled Ogne. On 3 November 1917, a royal resolution changed the spelling of the name of the municipality to Ogna.

=== Churches ===
The Church of Norway had one parish (sokn) within Ogna Municipality. At the time of the municipal dissolution, it was part of the Egersund prestegjeld and the Dalane prosti (deanery) in the Diocese of Stavanger.

Churches in Ogna Municipality
Parish (sokn)	Church name	Location of the church	Year built
Ogna	Ogna Church	Ogna	c. 1250

== Geography ==
The highest point in the municipality was the 416.1-metre (1,365 ft) tall mountain Brusaknuden on the border with Time Municipality. Time Municipality was located to the north, Bjerkreim Municipality was located to the east, Eigersund Municipality was located to the southeast, the North Sea was located to the southwest, and Varhaug Municipality was located to the northwest.

== Government ==
While it existed, Ogna Municipality was responsible for primary education (through 10th grade), outpatient health services, senior citizen services, welfare and other social services, zoning, economic development, and municipal roads and utilities. The municipality was governed by a municipal council of directly elected representatives. The mayor was indirectly elected by a vote of the municipal council. The municipality was under the jurisdiction of the Dalane District Court and the Gulating Court of Appeal.

=== Municipal council ===
The municipal council (Herredsstyre) of Ogna Municipality was made up of 15 representatives that were elected to four year terms. The tables below show the historical composition of the council by political party.

Ogna herredsstyre 1959–1963
Party name (in Norwegian)	Number of representatives
Labour Party (Arbeiderpartiet)	2
Christian Democratic Party (Kristelig Folkeparti)	5
Local List(s) (Lokale lister)	8
Total number of members:	15
Note: On 1 January 1964, Ogna Municipality became part of Hå Municipality.

Ogna herredsstyre 1955–1959
Party name (in Norwegian)	Number of representatives
Labour Party (Arbeiderpartiet)	2
Christian Democratic Party (Kristelig Folkeparti)	4
Local List(s) (Lokale lister)	9
Total number of members:	15

Ogna herredsstyre 1951–1955
Party name (in Norwegian)	Number of representatives
Labour Party (Arbeiderpartiet)	1
Christian Democratic Party (Kristelig Folkeparti)	4
Joint List(s) of Non-Socialist Parties (Borgerlige Felleslister)	3
Local List(s) (Lokale lister)	4
Total number of members:	12

Ogna herredsstyre 1947–1951
Party name (in Norwegian)	Number of representatives
Local List(s) (Lokale lister)	12
Total number of members:	12

Ogna herredsstyre 1945–1947
Party name (in Norwegian)	Number of representatives
Labour Party (Arbeiderpartiet)	1
Christian Democratic Party (Kristelig Folkeparti)	1
Local List(s) (Lokale lister)	10
Total number of members:	12

Ogna herredsstyre 1937–1941*
Party name (in Norwegian)	Number of representatives
Local List(s) (Lokale lister)	12
Total number of members:	12
Note: Due to the German occupation of Norway during World War II, no elections were held for new municipal councils until after the war ended in 1945.

=== Mayors ===
The mayor (Norwegian: ordfører) of Ogna Municipality was the political leader of the municipality and the chairperson of the municipal council. The following people have held this position:

- 1839–1839: Hans Abel Hiorth
- 1840–1843: Ole Gabrielsen Mathingsdal
- 1844–1847: Lars Johannessen Qverme
- 1848–1849: Sigbjørn Olsen Hølleland
- 1850–1853: Ole Gabrielsen Mathingdal
- 1854–1855: Lauritz Smith Hiorth
- 1856–1863: Sigbjørn Olsen Hølleland
- 1864–1864: Gabriel Olsen Mattingsdal
- 1865–1865: Christian Gundersen Friestad
- 1866–1889: Christopher Gjermundsen Varden
- 1890–1901: Hans Larsen Kvasheim
- 1902–1910: Jens Jonasen Hetland
- 1911–1922: Morten Omundsen Lindtjørn
- 1923–1934: John Omundsen Kvalbein
- 1935–1941: Morten Omundsen Lindtjørn
- 1941–1941: John Kvadsheim
- 1942–1945: Arne Kvadsheim
- 1945–1959: John Kvadsheim
- 1959–1964: Otto Kvalbein (LL)

== See also ==
- List of former municipalities of Norway
