= Varhaug (disambiguation) =

Varhaug may refer to:

== People ==
- Pål Varhaug (born 1991), a professional racing driver in Norway

== Places ==
- Varhaug, a village in Hå municipality in Rogaland county, Norway
- Varhaug Municipality, a former municipality in Rogaland county, Norway
- Varhaug Church, a church in Hå municipality in Rogaland county, Norway
- Varhaug Station, a railway station in Hå municipality in Rogaland county, Norway

== Other ==
- Varhaug IL, the main sports club for people living in the village of Varhaug, Norway
