= Hæen =

Village in Hå Municipality, Norway

Hæen Stokkalandsmarka / Stokkdalsmarka
- Village
- Interactive map of Hæen
- Coordinates: 58.56258°N 5.73994°E
- Country: Norway
- Region: Western Norway
- County: Rogaland
- District: Jæren
- Municipality: Hå Municipality

Area
  - Total: 0.53 km^{2} (0.20 sq mi)
- Elevation: 99 m (325 ft)

Population (2025)
  - Total: 877
  - Density: 1,655/km^{2} (4,290/sq mi)
- Time zone: UTC+01:00 (CET)
  - Summer (DST): UTC+02:00 (CEST)
- Post Code: 4362 Vigrestad

Hæen is a village in Hå Municipality in Rogaland county, Norway. The village is located between the villages of Vigrestad and Brusand. The Sørlandet Line runs along the south side of the village. The village is known as Hæen, but it is known locally as Stokkalandsmarka or Stokkdalsmarka. The name Hæen is used by Statistics Norway, but rarely used locally.

The 0.53-square-kilometre (130-acre) village has a population (2025) of 877 and a population density of 1,655 inhabitants per square kilometre (4,290/sq mi).

== Future growth ==
The municipal council of Hå Municipality has expressed a desire to get as much population growth in the municipality as possible to be centred between Hæen and Brusand to the southeast. There are two reasons for this desire:

- To balance the population in the municipality and not only have high population in the northern villages of Nærbø and Varhaug, but to increase growth in the south.
- The Hæen area is well-suited for building houses, since this area does not have the best agricultural land in the municipalitiy. Expanding the other villages in Hå would mean giving up some very good agricultural land.
