= Åna Prison =

Prison in Hå, Norway

Åna Prison Åna fengsel (Norwegian)
- Interactive map of the prison
- Location: 3 km (1.9 mi) south of Nærbø, Norway; 58°38′37.286″N 5°40′59.227″E
- Security class: Departments, with high and lower security
- Opened: 1912 as a forced labour institution
- Former name: Opstad tvangsarbeidshus, Åna kretsfengsel

Åna Prison (Norwegian: Åna fengsel) is a prison in Hå Municipality in Rogaland county, Norway. It is one of the largest prisons and has capacity for 219 inmates, 140 in a closed prison and 24 in a department with an open prison. The prison is for male inmates. There is no wall around the prison, but there are still very few escapes. The prison is located approximately an hour's drive south of Stavanger. There is no bus service to the prison. Åna is the largest correctional institution in the Southwestern Region of the Norwegian Correctional Services.

Åna prison is also one of the largest Norwegian governmental owned farms.

== History ==
Åna prison has origins as a forced labor institution. Opstad Forced Labor Institution (Norwegian: Opstad tvangsarbeidshus) was opened in 1912, and was a prison with hard labor for vagrants until the Vagrancy Act provisions on forced labor was abolished in 1970, and the institution became a regular prison. The institution changed its name to Åna Kretsfengsel, a name it had until 2000, when Åna was renamed to Åna fengsel.

In the closed section, there were many cells that contained four inmates, and Åna prison was the only prison in Norway that had so many prisoners in the same cell, and this scheme was criticized as unworthy. These cells were converted into cells for one inmate in 2010. Åna prison has also been notorious for major drug problems among the prisoners.

== Open Department ==
The 24 open prison facilities were opened in 2006 and consists of apartments with four people in each housing unit. This section is mainly for inmates who are in the final phase of their sentencing.

== Farming ==
Besides being among the largest Norwegian prisons, Åna also is one of the largest farms in the entire country. The cultivated area is used for feed production and grain, growing potatoes and vegetables. There is a barn containing approx. 100 adult dairy cows in addition to about 120 calves. There is also a piggery for 120 pigs. Biogas plant at the farm provides heating of the prison. Some of the inmates are working at the farm, if it is safe and proper.
