= Nærbø Municipality =

Former municipality in Rogaland, Norway

Nærbø Municipality Nærbø herred
- Former municipality
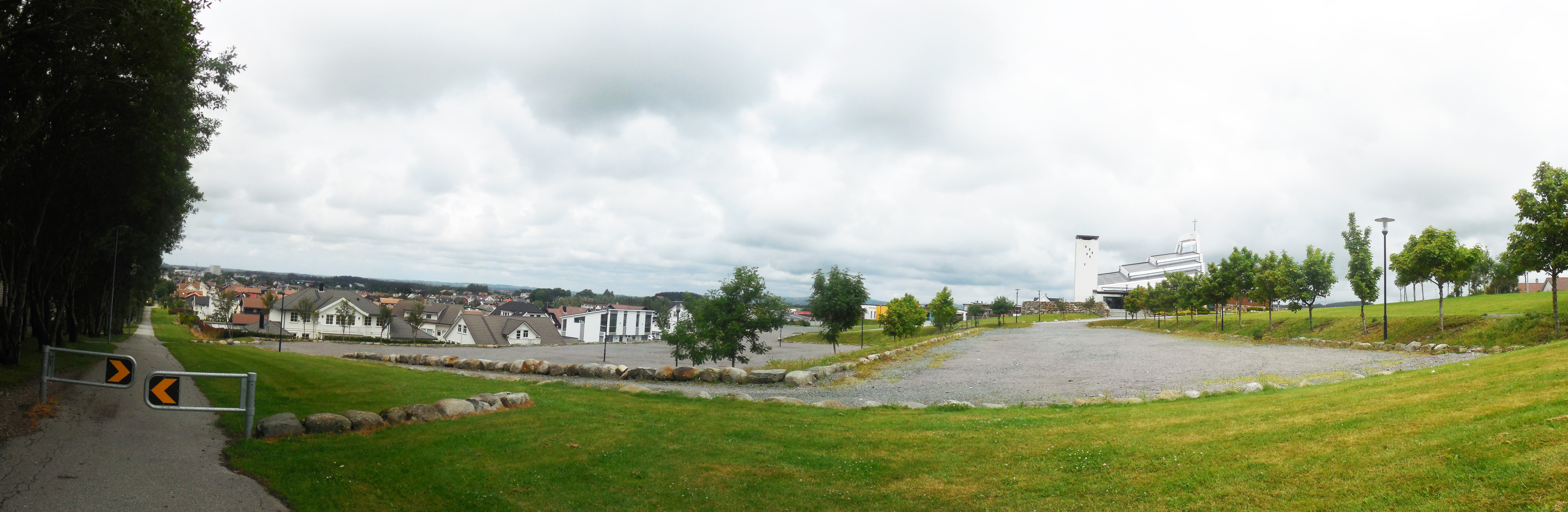
- Panorama of Nærbø

- Rogaland within Norway

- Nærbø within Rogaland
- Coordinates: 58°39′55″N 05°38′16″E
- Country: Norway
- County: Rogaland
- District: Jæren
- Established: 1 Jan 1894
  - Preceded by: Haa Municipality
- Disestablished: 1 Jan 1964
  - Succeeded by: Hå Municipality
- Administrative centre: Nærbø

Government
  - Mayor (1959–1963): Odd Skjærpe (KrF)

Area (upon dissolution)
  - Total: 65.1 km^{2} (25.1 sq mi)
  - Rank: #566 in Norway
- Highest elevation: 237 m (778 ft)

Population (1963)
  - Total: 3,844
  - Rank: #233 in Norway
  - Density: 59/km^{2} (150/sq mi)
  - Change (10 years): ▲ +18.2%
- Demonym: Nærbøbu

Official language
  - Norwegian form: Neutral
- Time zone: UTC+01:00 (CET)
  - Summer (DST): UTC+02:00 (CEST)
- ISO 3166 code: NO-1119

Nærbø is a former municipality in Rogaland county, Norway. The 65.1-square-kilometre (25.1 sq mi) municipality existed from 1894 until its dissolution in 1964. The area is now part of Hå Municipality in the traditional district of Jæren. The administrative centre was the village of Nærbø. Other villages in the municipality included Obrestad and Nærland.

Prior to its dissolution in 1964, the 65.1-square-kilometre (25.1 sq mi) municipality was the 566th largest by area out of the 689 municipalities in Norway. Nærbø Municipality was the 233th most populous municipality in Norway with a population of about 3,844. The municipality's population density was 59 inhabitants per square kilometre (150/sq mi) and its population had increased by 18.2% over the previous 10-year period.

== General information ==
The municipality of Nærbø was established in 1894 when the old Haa Municipality was divided into two municipalities: the northern district (population: 1801) became the new Nærbø Municipality and the southern district (population: 1806) became the new Varhaug Municipality.

During the 1960s, there were many municipal mergers across Norway due to the work of the Schei Committee. On 1 January 1964, the following areas were merged to form the new Hå Municipality (resurrecting the name of the old municipality that was dissolved in 1894):

- all of Nærbø Municipality (population: 3,926)
- all of Ogna Municipality (population: 1,470)
- all of Varhaug Municipality (population: 3,454)

=== Name ===
The municipality (originally the parish) is named after the old Nærbø farm (Old Norse: Neðribœr) since the Old Nærbø Church was built there. The first element is neðri which means "lower". The last element is bœr which means "farm" or "farmstead".

=== Churches ===
The Church of Norway had one parish (sokn) within Nærbø Municipality. At the time of the municipal dissolution, it was part of the Hå prestegjeld and the Jæren prosti (deanery) in the Diocese of Stavanger.

Churches in Nærbø Municipality
Parish (sokn)	Church name	Location of the church	Year built
Nærbø	Nærbø Church	Nærbø	1834

== Geography ==
The highest point in the municipality was the 237-metre (778 ft) tall point on the border with Time Municipality, just northwest of the hill Olsholen on the Varhaug Municipality/Time Municipality, just a short distance away. Klepp Municipality was located to the north, Time Municipality was located to the northeast/east, Varhaug Municipality was located to the south, and the North Sea was to the west.

== Government ==
While it existed, Nærbø Municipality was responsible for primary education (through 10th grade), outpatient health services, senior citizen services, welfare and other social services, zoning, economic development, and municipal roads and utilities. The municipality was governed by a municipal council of directly elected representatives. The mayor was indirectly elected by a vote of the municipal council. The municipality was under the jurisdiction of the Jæren District Court and the Gulating Court of Appeal.

=== Municipal council ===
The municipal council (Herredsstyre) of Nærbø Municipality was made up of 17 representatives that were elected to four year terms. The tables below show the historical composition of the council by political party.

Nærbø herredsstyre 1959–1963
Party name (in Norwegian)	Number of representatives
Labour Party (Arbeiderpartiet)	2
Christian Democratic Party (Kristelig Folkeparti)	5
Centre Party (Senterpartiet)	6
Liberal Party (Venstre)	3
Local List(s) (Lokale lister)	1
Total number of members:	17
Note: On 1 January 1964, Nærbø Municipality became part of Hå Municipality.

Nærbø herredsstyre 1955–1959
Party name (in Norwegian)	Number of representatives
Labour Party (Arbeiderpartiet)	2
Local List(s) (Lokale lister)	15
Total number of members:	17

Nærbø herredsstyre 1951–1955
Party name (in Norwegian)	Number of representatives
Labour Party (Arbeiderpartiet)	3
Local List(s) (Lokale lister)	13
Total number of members:	16

Nærbø herredsstyre 1947–1951
Party name (in Norwegian)	Number of representatives
Labour Party (Arbeiderpartiet)	2
Local List(s) (Lokale lister)	14
Total number of members:	16

Nærbø herredsstyre 1945–1947
Party name (in Norwegian)	Number of representatives
Labour Party (Arbeiderpartiet)	2
Local List(s) (Lokale lister)	14
Total number of members:	16

Nærbø herredsstyre 1937–1941*
Party name (in Norwegian)	Number of representatives
Joint List(s) of Non-Socialist Parties (Borgerlige Felleslister)	9
Local List(s) (Lokale lister)	7
Total number of members:	16
Note: Due to the German occupation of Norway during World War II, no elections were held for new municipal councils until after the war ended in 1945.

=== Mayors ===
The mayor (Norwegian: ordfører) of Nærbø Municipality was the political leader of the municipality and the chairperson of the municipal council. The following people have held this position:

- 1894–1897: Ingebret J. Gausland
- 1898–1898: Peder N. Njølstad
- 1899–1907: Sem N. Bø
- 1908–1910: Lars O. Vigre
- 1911–1913: Sem N. Bø
- 1914–1931: Tobias Obrestad
- 1931–1935: Rasmus Njølstad
- 1935–1941: Sven Gausland
- 1941–1941: Matheus Moi
- 1941–1945: Einar Lende Njå
- 1945–1947: Sven Gausland
- 1947–1951: Rasmus Njølstad
- 1951–1959: Hans N. Njærheim (Sp)
- 1959–1963: Odd Skjærpe (KrF)

== See also ==
- List of former municipalities of Norway
