= Kvassheim Lighthouse =

Lighthouse in Hå, Norway

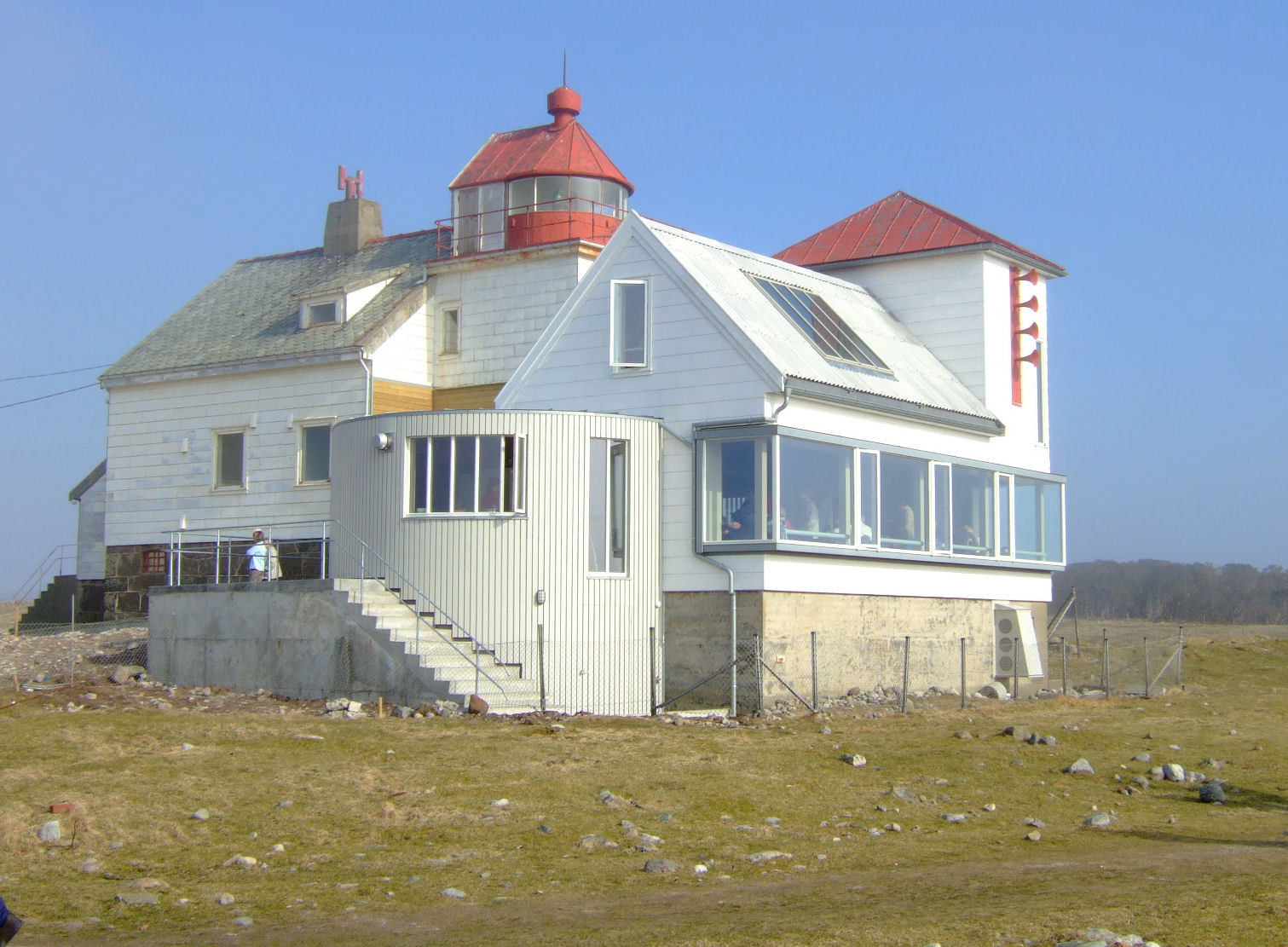
- View of the lighthouse
- Location: Hå Municipality, Rogaland, Norway
- Coordinates: 58°32′38″N 05°40′54″E

Tower
- Constructed: 1912 (first)
- Construction: Concrete tower
- Automated: 1990
- Height: 9.3 metres (31 ft)
- Shape: Cylindrical
- Markings: White tower with red stripe and red top
- Operator: Jæren Friluftsråd (old tower)

Light
- First lit: 1990 (current)
- Deactivated: 1990 (first)
- Focal height: 11.7 metres (38 ft)
- Intensity: 26,400 candela
- Range: white: 10 nmi (19 km; 12 mi) red: 8 nmi (15 km; 9.2 mi) green: 7 nmi (13 km; 8.1 mi)
- Characteristic: Oc(2) WRG 8s
- Norway no.: 098600

Kvassheim Lighthouse (Norwegian: Kvassheim fyr) is a lighthouse located on the beach at Kvassheim in Hå municipality in Rogaland county, Norway. It is about 2.5 kilometres (1.6 mi) south of the village of Vigrestad. The original building was established in 1912 and automated in 1984. In 1990, it was replaced with a smaller, automated lighthouse located about 70 metres (230 ft) to the west of the old building. The old building is now used as a museum and landmark.

The present lighthouse is on a 9.3-metre (31 ft) tall concrete post that is painted with red and white horizontal bands. The light on top sits at an elevation of 11.7 metres (38 ft) above sea level. The 26,400-candela light emits a white, red, or green beam (depending on direction) occulting twice every 8 seconds.

== History ==
The original wooden lighthouse was built in 1912 and has been inactive since 1990. The 12-metre (39 ft) tall lantern and gallery are centered on the roof of a 1 1/2-story wood keeper's house. The building is painted white, and the lantern is red. In 2003, the management of the old station was transferred to the Jæren Friluftsråd ("recreation council"), which began restoration work the following winter. The building now includes a cafeteria and a small museum. The site and lighthouse are open daily from late June to mid-August and on Sundays and holidays during the rest of the year, except January.

== See also ==
- Lighthouses in Norway
