= Varhaug Municipality =

Former municipality in Rogaland, Norway

Varhaug Municipality Varhaug herred
- Former municipality
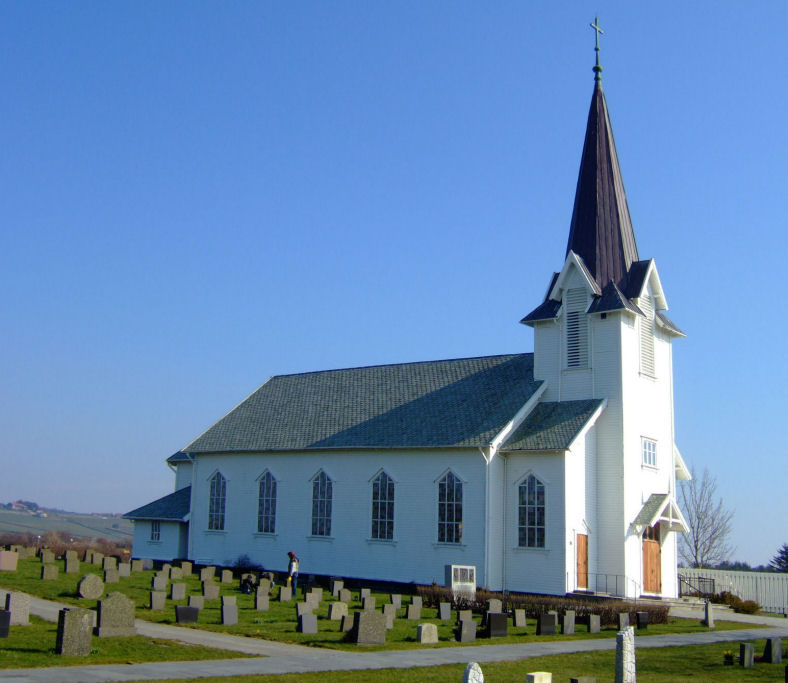
- View of Varhaug Church, the main church for the municipality

- Rogaland within Norway

- Varhaug within Rogaland
- Coordinates: 58°37′05″N 05°39′25″E
- Country: Norway
- County: Rogaland
- District: Jæren
- Established: 1 Jan 1894
  - Preceded by: Haa Municipality
- Disestablished: 1 Jan 1964
  - Succeeded by: Hå Municipality
- Administrative centre: Varhaug

Government
  - Mayor (1959–1963): I.I. Gausland

Area (upon dissolution)
  - Total: 85.5 km^{2} (33.0 sq mi)
  - Rank: #537 in Norway
- Highest elevation: 331 m (1,086 ft)

Population (1963)
  - Total: 3,438
  - Rank: #262 in Norway
  - Density: 40.2/km^{2} (104/sq mi)
  - Change (10 years): ▲ +7.9%
- Demonym: Varhaugsbu

Official language
  - Norwegian form: Neutral
- Time zone: UTC+01:00 (CET)
  - Summer (DST): UTC+02:00 (CEST)
- ISO 3166 code: NO-1118

Varhaug is a former municipality in Rogaland county, Norway. The 85.5-square-kilometre (33.0 sq mi) municipality existed from 1894 until its dissolution in 1964. The area is now part of Hå Municipality in the traditional district of Jæren. The administrative centre was the village of Varhaug. The other larger village in the municipality was Vigrestad.

Prior to its dissolution in 1964, the 85.5-square-kilometre (33.0 sq mi) municipality was the 537th largest by area out of the 689 municipalities in Norway. Varhaug Municipality was the 262nd most populous municipality in Norway with a population of about 3,438. The municipality's population density was 40.2 inhabitants per square kilometre (104/sq mi) and its population had increased by 7.9% over the previous 10-year period.

== General information ==
The municipality of Varhaug was established in 1894 when the old Haa Municipality was divided into two municipalities: the northern district (population: 1801) became the new Nærbø Municipality and the southern district (population: 1806) became the new Varhaug Municipality.

During the 1960s, there were many municipal mergers across Norway due to the work of the Schei Committee. On 1 January 1964, the following areas were merged to form the new Hå Municipality (resurrecting the name of the old municipality that was dissolved in 1894):

- all of Nærbø Municipality (population: 3,926)
- all of Ogna Municipality (population: 1,470)
- all of Varhaug Municipality (population: 3,454)

=== Name ===
The municipality (originally the parish) is named after the old Varhaug farm (Old Norse: Varhaugr) since the first Varhaug Church was built there. The first element is likely the word vǫr which means "row of stones" (such as a stone jetty) or "pile of stones" (such as after a landslide). The last element is haugr which means "burial mound" or "cairn".

=== Churches ===
The Church of Norway had one parish (sokn) within Varhaug Municipality. At the time of the municipal dissolution, it was part of the Hå prestegjeld and the Jæren prosti (deanery) in the Diocese of Stavanger.

Churches in Varhaug Municipality
Parish (sokn)	Church name	Location of the church	Year built
Varhaug	Varhaug Church	Varhaug	1904

== Geography ==
The highest point in the municipality was the 331-metre (1,086 ft) tall mountain Ihamaren, located on the border with Time Municipality. Nærbø Municipality was located to the north, Time Municipality was located to the east, Ogna Municipality was located to the south, and the North Sea was located to the west.

== Government ==
While it existed, Varhaug Municipality was responsible for primary education (through 10th grade), outpatient health services, senior citizen services, welfare and other social services, zoning, economic development, and municipal roads and utilities. The municipality was governed by a municipal council of directly elected representatives. The mayor was indirectly elected by a vote of the municipal council. The municipality was under the jurisdiction of the Jæren District Court and the Gulating Court of Appeal.

=== Municipal council ===
The municipal council (Herredsstyre) of Varhaug Municipality was made up of 17 representatives that were elected to four year terms. The tables below show the historical composition of the council by political party.

Varhaug herredsstyre 1959–1963
Party name (in Norwegian)	Number of representatives
Labour Party (Arbeiderpartiet)	1
Local List(s) (Lokale lister)	16
Total number of members:	17
Note: On 1 January 1964, Varhaug Municipality became part of Hå Municipality.

Varhaug herredsstyre 1955–1959
Party name (in Norwegian)	Number of representatives
Labour Party (Arbeiderpartiet)	4
Local List(s) (Lokale lister)	13
Total number of members:	17

Varhaug herredsstyre 1951–1955
Party name (in Norwegian)	Number of representatives
Labour Party (Arbeiderpartiet)	3
Local List(s) (Lokale lister)	13
Total number of members:	16

Varhaug herredsstyre 1947–1951
Party name (in Norwegian)	Number of representatives
Local List(s) (Lokale lister)	16
Total number of members:	16

Varhaug herredsstyre 1945–1947
Party name (in Norwegian)	Number of representatives
List of workers, fishermen, and small farmholders (Arbeidere, fiskere, småbrukere liste)	1
Local List(s) (Lokale lister)	15
Total number of members:	16

Varhaug herredsstyre 1937–1941*
Party name (in Norwegian)	Number of representatives
Farmers' Party (Bondepartiet)	4
Local List(s) (Lokale lister)	12
Total number of members:	16
Note: Due to the German occupation of Norway during World War II, no elections were held for new municipal councils until after the war ended in 1945.

=== Mayors ===
The mayor (Norwegian: ordfører) of Varhaug Municipality was the political leader of the municipality and the chairperson of the municipal council. The following people have held this position:

- 1894–1904: Halvor T. Aarrestad
- 1905–1913: Svend H. Aanestad
- 1914–1916: Rasmus Hobberstad
- 1917–1922: Halvor T. Aarrestad
- 1923–1928: Andreas Stavnheim
- 1929–1931: Sivert Høien
- 1932–1941: G.L.M. Ueland
- 1941–1941: Rasmus Varhaug
- 1942–1942: John F. Johnsen
- 1943–1945: Rasmus Varhaug
- 1945–1951: G.L.M. Ueland
- 1951–1959: Karsten Aanestad
- 1959–1963: I.I. Gausland

== See also ==
- List of former municipalities of Norway
