= Obrestad Lighthouse =

Coastal lighthouse in Norway

Obrestad Lighthouse Obrestad fyr
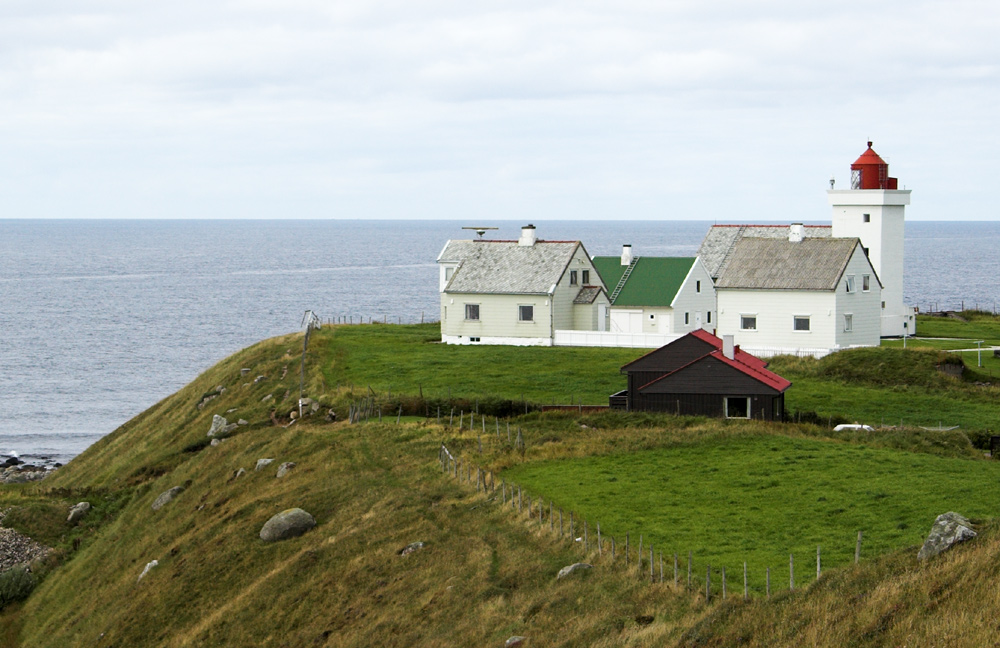
- View of the lighthouse
- Location: Rogaland, Norway
- Coordinates: 58°39′29″N 5°33′16″E

Tower
- Constructed: 1873
- Construction: Granite tower
- Automated: 1991
- Height: 16.5 m (54 ft)
- Shape: Square tower with balcony and lantern attached to keeper's house
- Markings: White tower and balcony, red lantern
- Operator: Obrestad Fyr
- Heritage: cultural property
- Racon: O

Light
- First lit: 1950
- Focal height: 39 m (128 ft)
- Intensity: Continuous: 129,900 candela Flash: 1,526,000 cd
- Range: 18 nmi (33 km; 21 mi)
- Characteristic: FFl W 30s
- Norway no.: 099000

Obrestad Lighthouse (Norwegian: Obrestad fyr) is a coastal lighthouse located on the north side of the small farming village of Obrestad in Hå Municipality in Rogaland county, Norway. It sits on a promontory about 5 kilometres (3.1 mi) west of the village of Nærbø. The square tower was first lit in 1873 and the tower was rebuilt in its present form in 1950. The lighthouse was automated in 1991 and has been a protected historical building since 2000.

The 16.5-metre (54 ft) tall square granite tower is attached to the landward end of a 1 1/2-story granite lighthouse keeper's home. The tower is painted white with a red lantern room on the top. The keeper's house, which was built in 1905, is unpainted stone. The light itself sits at an elevation of 39 metres (128 ft) above sea level. The light emits a continuous white light with an intensity of 129,900 candela with a more intense white flash (1,526,000 cd) every 30 seconds. The lighthouse also emits a racon signal: the Morse code letter "O".

The municipal council of Hå Municipality purchased the lighthouse station in 2006. There is a museum in the lighthouse and the keeper's house is available for private functions or overnight accommodations. The site is open to visitors daily from mid-June through mid-August and on Sundays from March through June and August through December.

== Climate ==
Climate data for Obrestad Lighthouse 1991-2020 (24 m)
Month	Jan	Feb	Mar	Apr	May	Jun	Jul	Aug	Sep	Oct	Nov	Dec	Year
Mean daily maximum °C (°F)	4.5 (40.1)	3.9 (39.0)	5.2 (41.4)	8.4 (47.1)	11.5 (52.7)	14 (57)	16.8 (62.2)	17.6 (63.7)	15.1 (59.2)	11.4 (52.5)	7.9 (46.2)	5.5 (41.9)	10.2 (50.3)
Daily mean °C (°F)	2.8 (37.0)	2 (36)	3.1 (37.6)	5.9 (42.6)	9.1 (48.4)	11.7 (53.1)	14.3 (57.7)	15.1 (59.2)	12.9 (55.2)	9.2 (48.6)	5.9 (42.6)	3.6 (38.5)	8.0 (46.4)
Mean daily minimum °C (°F)	0.4 (32.7)	−0.3 (31.5)	1 (34)	3.4 (38.1)	6.5 (43.7)	9.5 (49.1)	12.2 (54.0)	12.7 (54.9)	10.6 (51.1)	6.9 (44.4)	3.6 (38.5)	1.1 (34.0)	5.6 (42.2)
Average precipitation mm (inches)	132 (5.2)	100 (3.9)	88 (3.5)	67 (2.6)	64 (2.5)	67 (2.6)	88 (3.5)	127 (5.0)	130 (5.1)	155 (6.1)	152 (6.0)	130 (5.1)	1,309 (51.5)
Average precipitation days (≥ 1 mm)	15.0	11.2	13.3	11.2	11.5	10.7	11.4	13.9	16.6	17.5	18.3	16.6	167.2
Source 1: yr.no/Norwegian Meteorological Institute (mean, precipitation]
Source 2: NOAA-WMO averages 91-2020 Norway

== See also ==
- Lighthouses in Norway
- List of lighthouses in Norway
