= Vigrestad Station =

Railway station in Hå, Norway

Vigrestad

General information
- Location: Vigrestad, Hå Municipality; Norway
- Coordinates: 58.5703°N 5.6880°E
- Elevation: 32.6 m (107 ft)
- Owner: Norwegian National Rail Administration
- Operator: Go-Ahead Norge
- Line: Sørlandet Line
- Distance: 549.75 km (341.60 mi)
- Platforms: 2
- Connections: Bus: Kolumbus

History
- Opened: 1878
Location

Vigrestad Station (Norwegian: Vigrestad stasjon) is a railway station located on the Sørland Line at Vigrestad in Hå Municipality, Norway. The station is served by the Jæren Commuter Rail between Stavanger and Egersund. The station is 49.22 kilometers (30.58 mi) south of the city of Stavanger.

Preceding station	Local trains	Following station
Varhaug towards Stavanger	L5 Jæren Commuter Rail	Brusand towards Egersund
