= Brusand Station =

Railway station in Hå, Norway

Brusand

General information
- Location: Brusand, Hå Municipality; Norway
- Coordinates: 58.5404°N 5.7489°E
- Elevation: 2.8 m (9 ft 2 in)
- Owner: Norwegian National Rail Administration
- Operator: Go-Ahead Norge
- Line: Sørlandet Line
- Distance: 544.77 km (338.50 mi)
- Platforms: 1
- Connections: Bus: Kolumbus

History
- Opened: 1879
Location

Brusand Station (Norwegian: Brusand stasjon) is a railway station located on the Sørland Line at Brusand in Hå Municipality in Rogaland county, Norway. The station is served by Jæren Commuter Rail between Stavanger and Egersund. The station is 54.17 kilometers (33.66 mi) south of the city of Stavanger and was opened one year after Jæren Line was completed, in 1879. Prior to 1922, the name was simply Bru.

Preceding station	Local trains	Following station
Vigrestad towards Stavanger	L5 Jæren Commuter Rail	Ogna towards Egersund
