= Nærbø =

Village in Hå Municipality, Norway

- Village
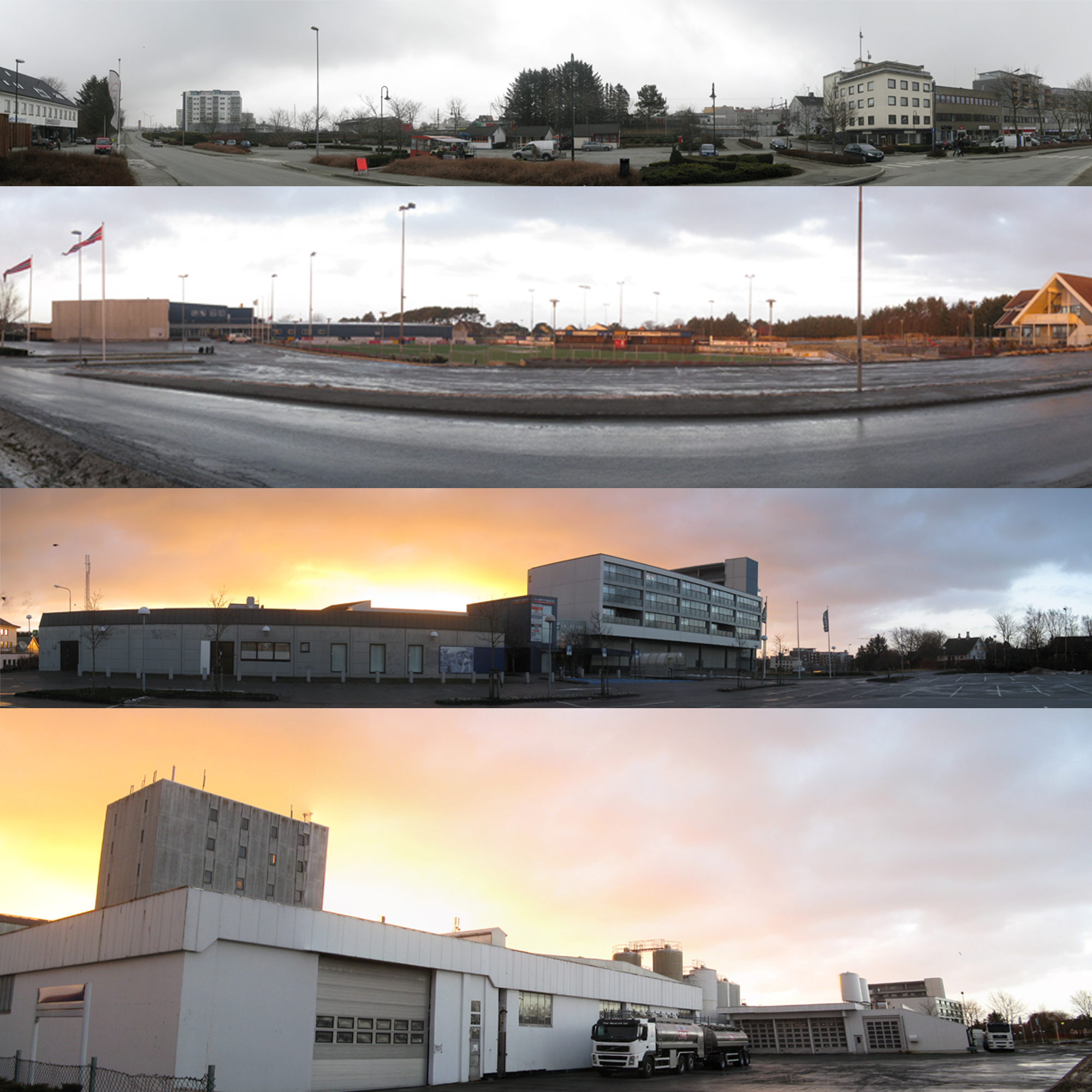
- Views of the village
- Interactive map of Nærbø
- Coordinates: 58.66547°N 5.63789°E
- Country: Norway
- Region: Western Norway
- County: Rogaland
- District: Jæren
- Municipality: Hå Municipality

Area
  - Total: 3.15 km^{2} (1.22 sq mi)
- Elevation: 27 m (89 ft)

Population (2025)
  - Total: 7,736
  - Density: 2,456/km^{2} (6,360/sq mi)
- Time zone: UTC+01:00 (CET)
  - Summer (DST): UTC+02:00 (CEST)
- Post Code: 4365 Nærbø

Nærbø is the largest village in Hå Municipality in Rogaland county, Norway. The village is located in the district of Jæren, about half-way between the town of Bryne and the village of Varhaug. The village sits about 38 kilometres (24 mi) south of Norway's fourth largest city, Stavanger. The village was the administrative centre of the old Nærbø Municipality from 1894 until 1964 when it was merged into Hå Municipality.

The 3.15-square-kilometre (780-acre) village has a population (2025) of 7,736 and a population density of 2,456 inhabitants per square kilometre (6,360/sq mi).

The Sørlandet Line, traditionally the Jæren Line, runs through the village, with the Jæren Commuter Rail service stopping at Nærbø Station, while the intercity service is accessible from nearby Bryne Station. County Road 44 passes west of the village.

The area around Nærbø is one of the most important agricultural areas of Norway with almost half of the land in the municipality being used for agricultural purposes. The area is sometimes referred to as the breadbasket of Norway because of its large agricultural sector.

== History ==
Archaeologists have found traces of human activity dating back as far as 6000 years B.C in the area. Most of these findings have been in the vicinity of the river Hååna, which flows from the hills in the east of the municipality to the ocean in the west. These early inhabitants were mostly hunters that survived on fishing and small game hunting.

In 3000 B.C., the area was covered by large oak and pine forests. It is also during that time that people started to settle down and farm the land. The transition from hunting to agriculture led to the clearing of most of the forests.

The region also played an important part in the Viking Age (eighth to eleventh centuries). Nærbø is located about 35 kilometres (22 mi) south of the Hafrsfjorden, where in 872 the Battle of Hafrsfjord took place. The western parts of Norway were unified under one monarch after this battle.

In 950, Erik the Red, founder of the first Norse settlement in Greenland was born in Øksnevad, about 17 kilometres (11 mi) north of Nærbø. Erik the Red was also the father of the famous Viking explorer Leif Erikson, who was the first European to set foot on the American mainland in 1003.

In 968, Olav Trygvason, the King of Norway from 995 to 1000 was born in Obrestad just outside the village of Nærbø. Olav Trygvason played a big part in bringing Christianity to Norway and is believed to have built the first church in Norway in 995. He also founded the city of Trondheim in 997.

In 1349, the Black Plague killed nearly 2/3rds of the population in the area.

In 1878, the Jærbanen rail line was completed with Nærbø Station in this village.

In 1940, the Germans invaded Norway and large areas of the coastline of Jæren was lined with high explosive mines. The Germans forced many of the Norwegian men in the area to work as labourers for the German occupying forces.

=== Name ===
The name Nærbø dates back to 1834 when the two local church congregations of Njærheim and Bø were amalgamated and the resulting congregation was called Nærbø. The church for this congregation was called the Nærbø Church (today called the Old Nærbø Church since the "new" Nærbø Church was built in 2005).

== Economy ==
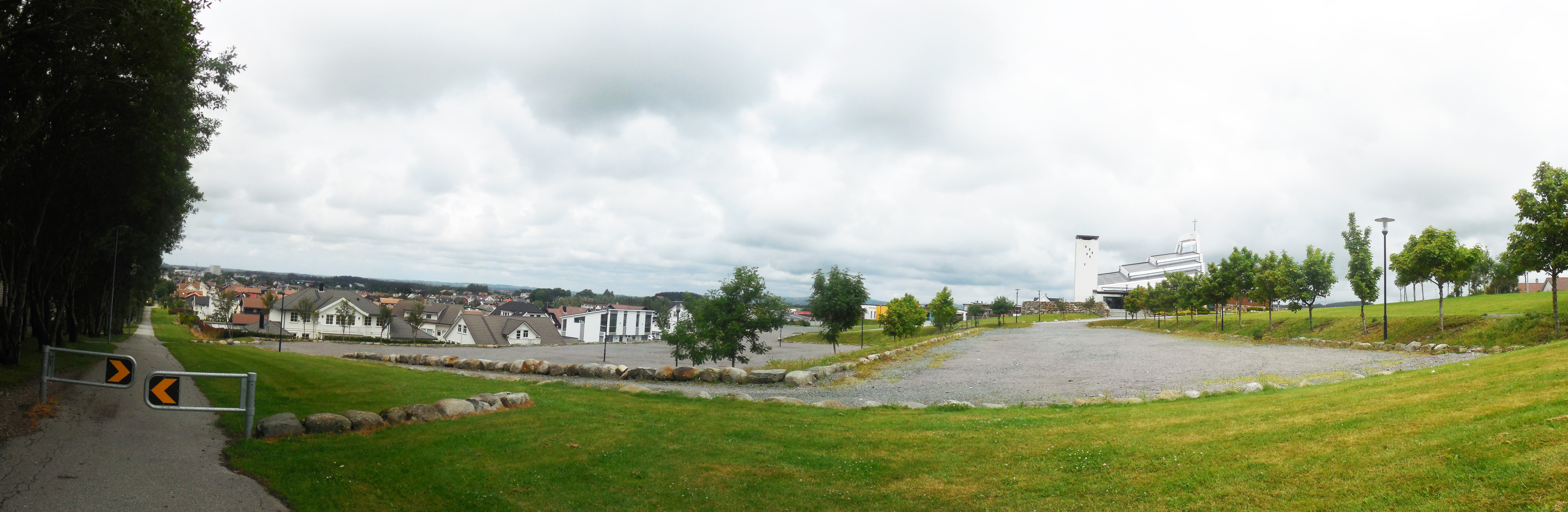
Nærbø seen from Rosk

The region is an important agricultural area and subsequently a great proportion of the inhabitants are employed in the agricultural sector. The village has one of Norway's biggest dairies which produces 82,200,000 litres (18,100,000 imp gal; 21,700,000 US gal) of milk each year. The Tine dairy also makes the famous Jarlsberg and Norvegia cheeses, in addition to other dairy products. The dairy employs 64 people.

The Risa group (formerly Brødrene Risa) is run from Nærbø and has several facilities in Nærbø.

The village also has an abattoir and local shopping centers.

Because of Nærbø close proximity to the cities of Sandnes and Stavanger, it has attracted many new inhabitants from these two cities. This is mainly due to more affordable real estate prices in Nærbø, and a relatively short commute between Nærbø and Sandnes/Stavanger. Stavanger is approximately 38 kilometres (24 mi) away from Nærbø, and Sandnes is 25 kilometres (16 mi) away.

There are four elementary schools in Nærbø (Motland skule, Bø skule, Vigre skule, Høyland skule), and a secondary school (Nærbø Ungdomsskule). There is also the private Tryggheim Christian high school and college in the village.

== Climate ==
The village centre is located approximately 4 kilometres (2.5 mi) from the North Sea coast. The climate is classified as mild oceanic climate, and the flat open landscape makes the village a rather windy place. Up until the mid-1980s, the village experienced relatively heavy snowfalls, and the snow tended to stay on the ground throughout the winter months. But due to rising temperatures in the last two decades, heavy snowfalls have become less frequent. Climate data from Obrestad Lighthouse is shown below (5 km from Nærbø)

Climate data for Obrestad Lighthouse 1991-2020 (24 m)
Month	Jan	Feb	Mar	Apr	May	Jun	Jul	Aug	Sep	Oct	Nov	Dec	Year
Mean daily maximum °C (°F)	4.5 (40.1)	3.9 (39.0)	5.2 (41.4)	8.4 (47.1)	11.5 (52.7)	14 (57)	16.8 (62.2)	17.6 (63.7)	15.1 (59.2)	11.4 (52.5)	7.9 (46.2)	5.5 (41.9)	10.2 (50.3)
Daily mean °C (°F)	2.8 (37.0)	2 (36)	3.1 (37.6)	5.9 (42.6)	9.1 (48.4)	11.7 (53.1)	14.3 (57.7)	15.1 (59.2)	12.9 (55.2)	9.2 (48.6)	5.9 (42.6)	3.6 (38.5)	8.0 (46.4)
Mean daily minimum °C (°F)	0.4 (32.7)	−0.3 (31.5)	1 (34)	3.4 (38.1)	6.5 (43.7)	9.5 (49.1)	12.2 (54.0)	12.7 (54.9)	10.6 (51.1)	6.9 (44.4)	3.6 (38.5)	1.1 (34.0)	5.6 (42.2)
Average precipitation mm (inches)	132 (5.2)	100 (3.9)	88 (3.5)	67 (2.6)	64 (2.5)	67 (2.6)	88 (3.5)	127 (5.0)	130 (5.1)	155 (6.1)	152 (6.0)	130 (5.1)	1,309 (51.5)
Average precipitation days (≥ 1 mm)	15.0	11.2	13.3	11.2	11.5	10.7	11.4	13.9	16.6	17.5	18.3	16.6	167.2
Source 1: yr.no/Norwegian Meteorological Institute (mean, precipitation]
Source 2: NOAA-WMO averages 91-2020 Norway

== Åna Prison ==
One of the largest prisons in Norway, Åna Prison, which was originally built as a labor camp in 1912, but later converted into an ordinary prison, is located approximately 3 kilometres (1.9 mi) south of the village center. The prison has a total capacity of 164 inmates, including a low security wing with a capacity to house 24 inmates. The prison is surrounded by farmland and has one of Norway's biggest farms.

== Attractions ==
- The Hå Vicarage was built in 1637 and is located to the west of the village and overlooks the North Sea. It has been fully renovated and these days it's used as an art gallery. There's also a museum on the ground floor. The landscape surrounding the Vicarage has several Viking burial mounds.
- Grødelandstunet is located to the south west of Nærbø near the coast, and is a traditional farm house that has been turned into a museum. The purpose of the museum is to give visitors an idea of how people in the region used to live in earlier times.
- Beaches: Because of Nærbø close proximity to the North Sea the village is blessed with easy access to several beaches, which are popular destinations for the local population during the summer months. The largest beach in Norway, Brusand beach, is only a 15-minute drive away. The beaches are also popular with surfers and are considered to be some of the better spots in Europe for wave surfing due to the rough seas the area experiences in the autumn and the winter months.
- The Nærbø Park is located about 0.5 kilometres (0.31 mi) away from the village centre. It contains a big man-made pond, a pine forest, and several footpaths. The park is known for its exotic bird population.
- The river Hååna which flows through the Hå municipality is one of the best salmon rivers in the country and attracts many visitors each year. Special fishing permits can be bought from the local farmers that own the various sections of the river. One also need to pay the National fishing licence to The Directorate for Nature Management.
- Obrestad Lighthouse is located to the southwest of the village. It was built in 1873 and renovated in 1949. Today it is fully automated and owned by the Norwegian coastal administration. The lighthouse is protected by the Cultural Heritage Act. The lighthouse is open to the public through guided tours. There is also a marina in the area sheltered by a man-made jetty. There is also a weather station at the light house. On 2 June 1975, a minimum temperature of −0.9 °C (30.4 °F) was recorded. This is the lowest temperature recorded for the month of June in Rogaland.

=== Nærbø Motorfestival ===
Nærbø is the only place in Norway which hosts an annual Formula 3 race. The race takes place on the streets of the village centre. The track is approximately 1,200 metres (3,900 ft) long and ranges from 6 to 8 metres (20 to 26 ft) in width. The festival started in 1997 and has been a popular event ever since, attracting people from all over the country. Speeds in excess of 200 kilometres per hour (120 mph) has been reached on several occasions. The event has been referred to by the locals as a miniature version of the Monte Carlo Grand Prix.

In 2006, one of the Formula 3 cars came crashing over one of the concrete guard blocks lining the outer perimeter of the track and smashed into the crowd, killing a 16-year-old spectator. Many feared that this would be the end of the event, but stricter security measures have been introduced and approvals have been granted for future festivals. The festival however has never (as of 2025) been resumed.

=== Sport ===
Sport is very popular in Nærbø, and the village has top of the range sports facilities. The village boasts two indoor handball fields, one ice hockey rink, a swimming pool, and several outdoor football pitches. In 1993, the sports administration centre in Loen burnt down to the ground, and an effort to rebuild it was immediately undertaken. The rebuilding process was mainly achieved by voluntary work by the local population, commonly known as dugnad. More than 850 locals were involved in the building process and almost 15,000 working hours were invested to achieve this goal. Two years later, the new administration centre was finally inaugurated.

The Idrettslunden staged significant motorcycle speedway events, when it held a qualifying round of the Speedway World Team Cup in 1972 and hosted the final of the Norwegian Individual Speedway Championship in 1974, 1976, 1978 and 1980.

== Notable people ==
- Georg Fredrik Rieber-Mohn, a former National Attorney.
- Kjell Arild Pollestad, a former Catholic priest, author, and travel guide
- Gunnar Torvund, a sculptor
- Helge Torvund, a poet, author, translator, critic, and psychologist
- Henriette Henriksen, a handball player that has played for the national handball team.
