= Sirevåg Station =

Railway station in Hå, Norway

Sirevåg
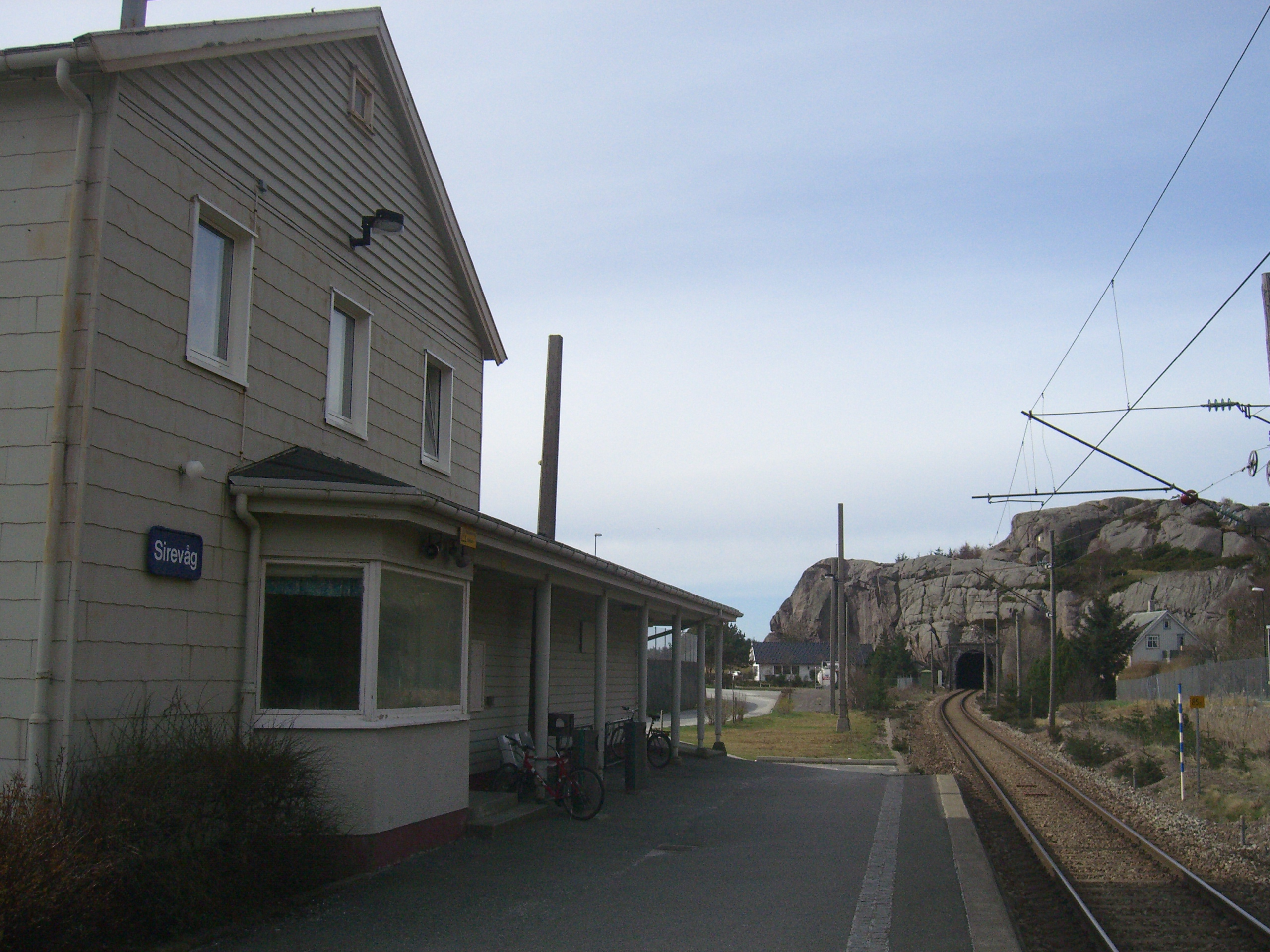

General information
- Location: Sirevåg, Hå Municipality; Norway
- Coordinates: 58.50266°N 5.80696°E
- Elevation: 13.9 m (46 ft)
- Owner: Norwegian National Rail Administration
- Operator: Go-Ahead Norge
- Line: Sørlandet Line
- Distance: 538.74 km (334.76 mi)
- Platforms: 1
- Connections: Bus: Kolumbus

History
- Opened: 1879
Location

Sirevåg Station (Norwegian: Sirevåg holdeplass) is a railway station located at Sirevåg in Hå Municipality, Norway on the Sørlandet Line. The station is served by the Jæren Commuter Rail between Stavanger and Egersund. The station is 60.36 kilometers (37.51 mi) south of the city of Stavanger. The station was opened in 1879, one year after the Jæren Line. Prior to 1935, the station was called Store Sirevåg.

Preceding station	Local trains	Following station
Ogna towards Stavanger	L5 Jæren Commuter Rail	Hellvik towards Egersund
