= Old Nærbø Church =

Church in Rogaland, Norway

- Nærbø gamle kirke
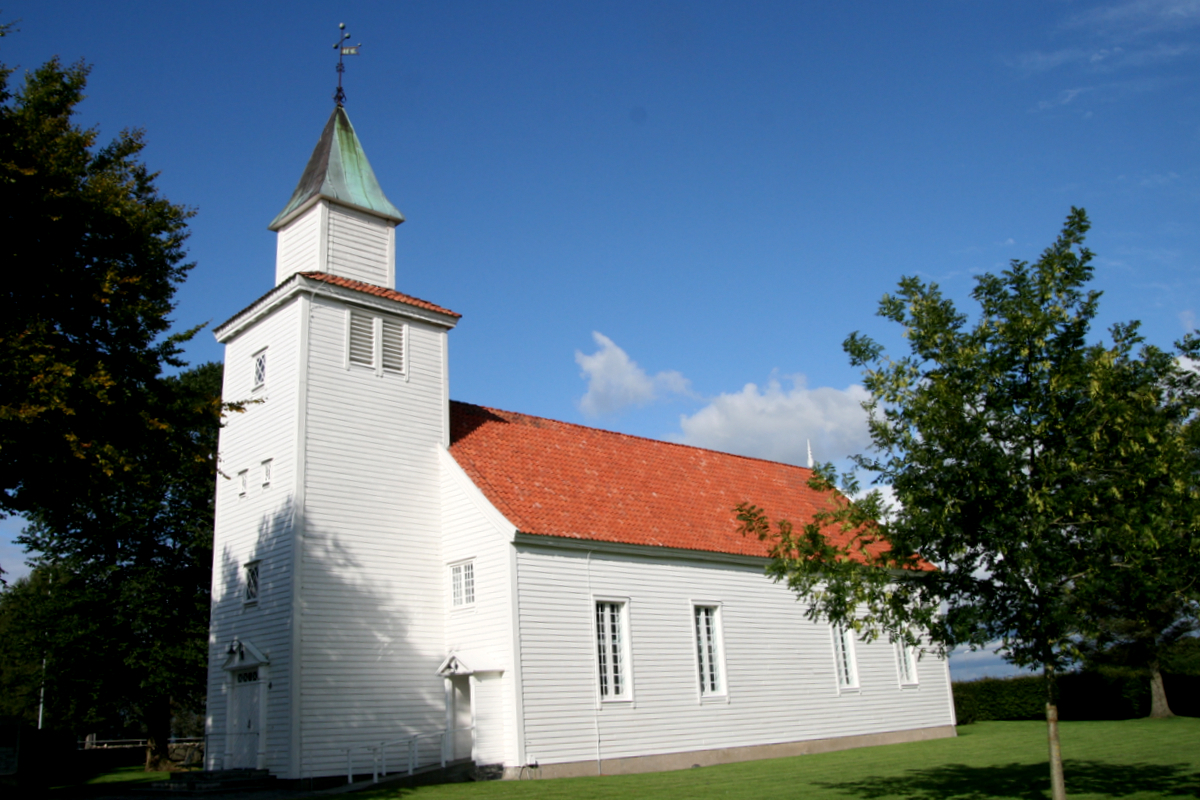
- View of the church
- Old Nærbø Church
- 58.662441°N 05.626223°E
- Location: Hå Municipality, Rogaland
- Country: Norway
- Denomination: Church of Norway
- Churchmanship: Evangelical Lutheran

History
- Former name: Nærbø kirke
- Status: Parish church
- Founded: 1834
- Consecrated: 1834

Architecture
- Functional status: Inactive
- Architect: Hans Linstow
- Architectural type: Long church
- Completed: 1834 (192 years ago)

Specifications
- Capacity: 350
- Materials: Wood

Administration
- Diocese: Stavanger bispedømme
- Deanery: Jæren prosti
- Parish: Nærbø
- Norwegian Cultural Heritage Site
- Type: Church
- Status: Listed
- ID: 85188

Old Nærbø Church (Norwegian: Nærbø gamle kirke) is a former parish church of the Church of Norway in Hå Municipality in Rogaland county, Norway. It is located in the village of Nærbø. It used to be the main church for the Nærbø parish which is part of the Jæren prosti (deanery) in the Diocese of Stavanger. The white, wooden church was built in a long church style in 1834 using designs by the architect Hans Linstow. The church seats about 350 people.

== History ==
The medieval Njærheim Church and Bø Church were located to the west and east of the present-day village now known as Nærbø. In the early 1830s, it was decided that both old church es should be torn down and the two parishes would be merged. The new parish was a combination of Njærheim and Bø and would be called Nærbø. The new parish would be based at a new church in a central location. The new church was completed in 1834 and it was known as Nærbø Church.

Over time, the church became too small for the growing community. In 2005, a "new" Nærbø Church was built in a more central part of the village. After the completion of the new church, this church has no longer been used for regular worship services and other activities. This church is now only used for special occasions. There is no graveyard surrounding the new church, so the graveyard surrounding the old church is still in use.

== See also ==
- List of churches in Rogaland
