= Hå Municipality =

Municipality in Rogaland, Norway

Hå Municipality Hå kommune
- Municipality
- Haa herred (historic name)
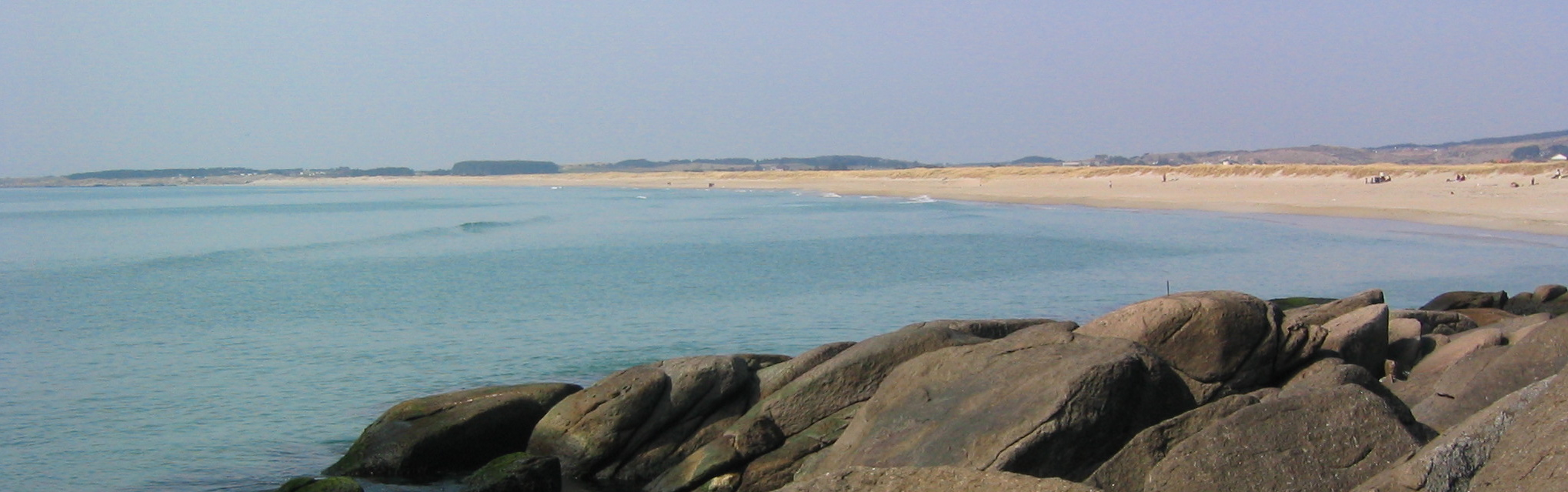
- View of the Brusandstrand beach in Hå

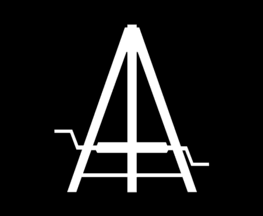
- Flag Coat of arms

- Rogaland within Norway

- Hå within Rogaland
- Coordinates: 58°36′23″N 05°43′29″E
- Country: Norway
- County: Rogaland
- District: Jæren
- Established: 1 Jan 1838
  - Created as: Formannskapsdistrikt
- Disestablished: 1 Jan 1894
  - Succeeded by: Nærbø Municipality & Varhaug Municipality
- Re-established: 1 Jan 1964
  - Preceded by: Nærbø Municipality; Varhaug Municipality; Ogna Municipality
- Administrative centre: Varhaug

Government
  - Mayor (2023): Andreas Bjorland (KrF)

Area
  - Total: 258.00 km^{2} (99.61 sq mi)
  - Land: 247.75 km^{2} (95.66 sq mi)
  - Water: 10.25 km^{2} (3.96 sq mi) 4%
  - Rank: #282 in Norway
- Highest elevation: 416.1 m (1,365 ft)

Population (2026)
  - Total: 20,087
  - Rank: #69 in Norway
  - Density: 77.9/km^{2} (202/sq mi)
  - Change (10 years): ▲ +8%
- Demonym: Håbu

Official language
  - Norwegian form: Neutral
- Time zone: UTC+01:00 (CET)
  - Summer (DST): UTC+02:00 (CEST)
- ISO 3166 code: NO-1119
- Website: Official website

Hå is a municipality in Rogaland county, Norway. It is the southernmost municipality in the traditional district of Jæren. The administrative centre of the municipality is the village of Varhaug. Other villages in Hå include Brusand, Hæen, Nærbø, Obrestad, Ogna, Sirevåg, and Vigrestad.

The 258-square-kilometre (100 sq mi) municipality is the 282nd largest by area out of the 357 municipalities in Norway. Hå Municipality is the 69th most populous municipality in Norway with a population of 20,087. The municipality's population density is 77.9 inhabitants per square kilometre (202/sq mi) and its population has increased by 8% over the previous 10-year period.

== General information ==
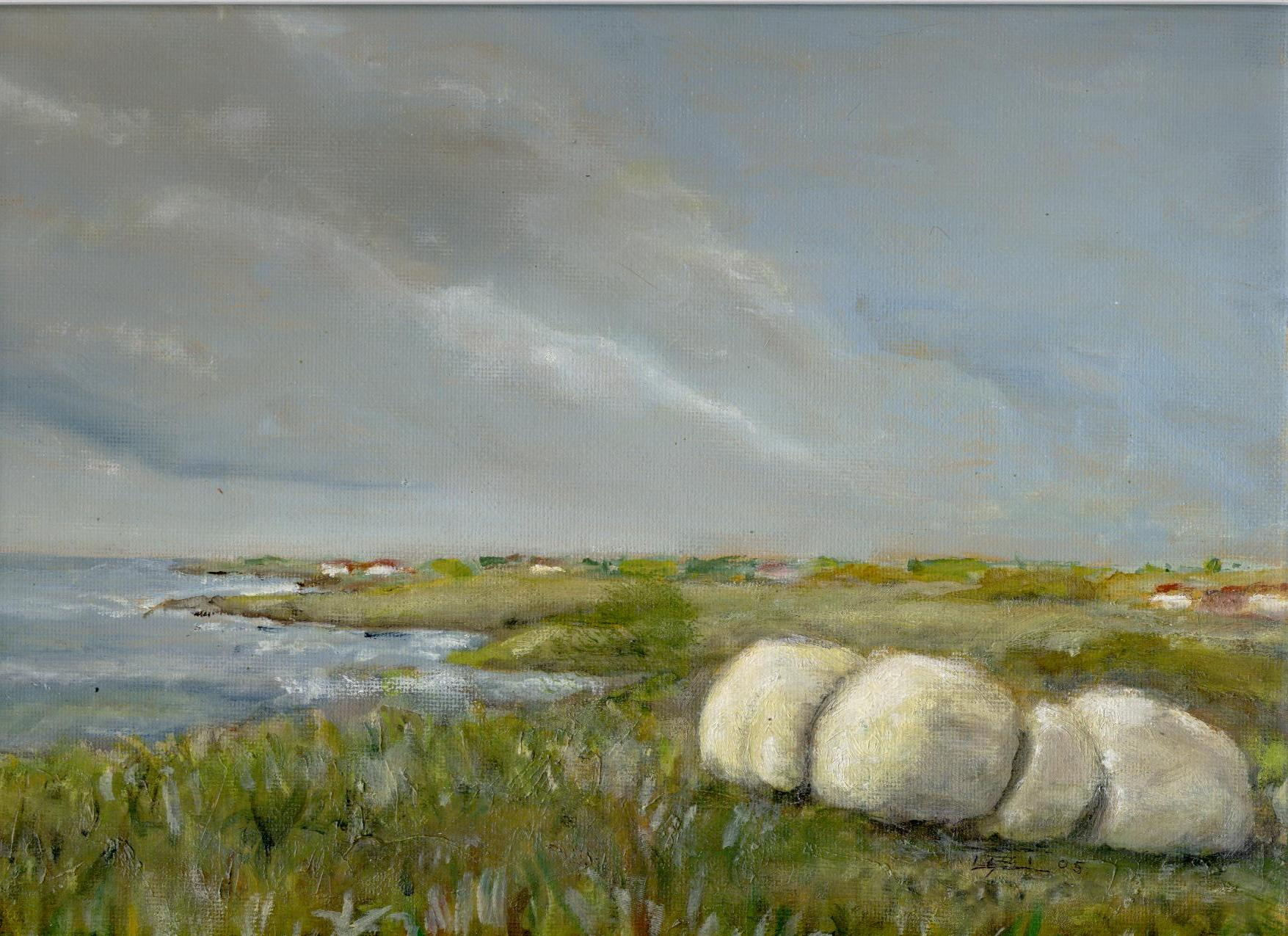
View of the Hå landscape

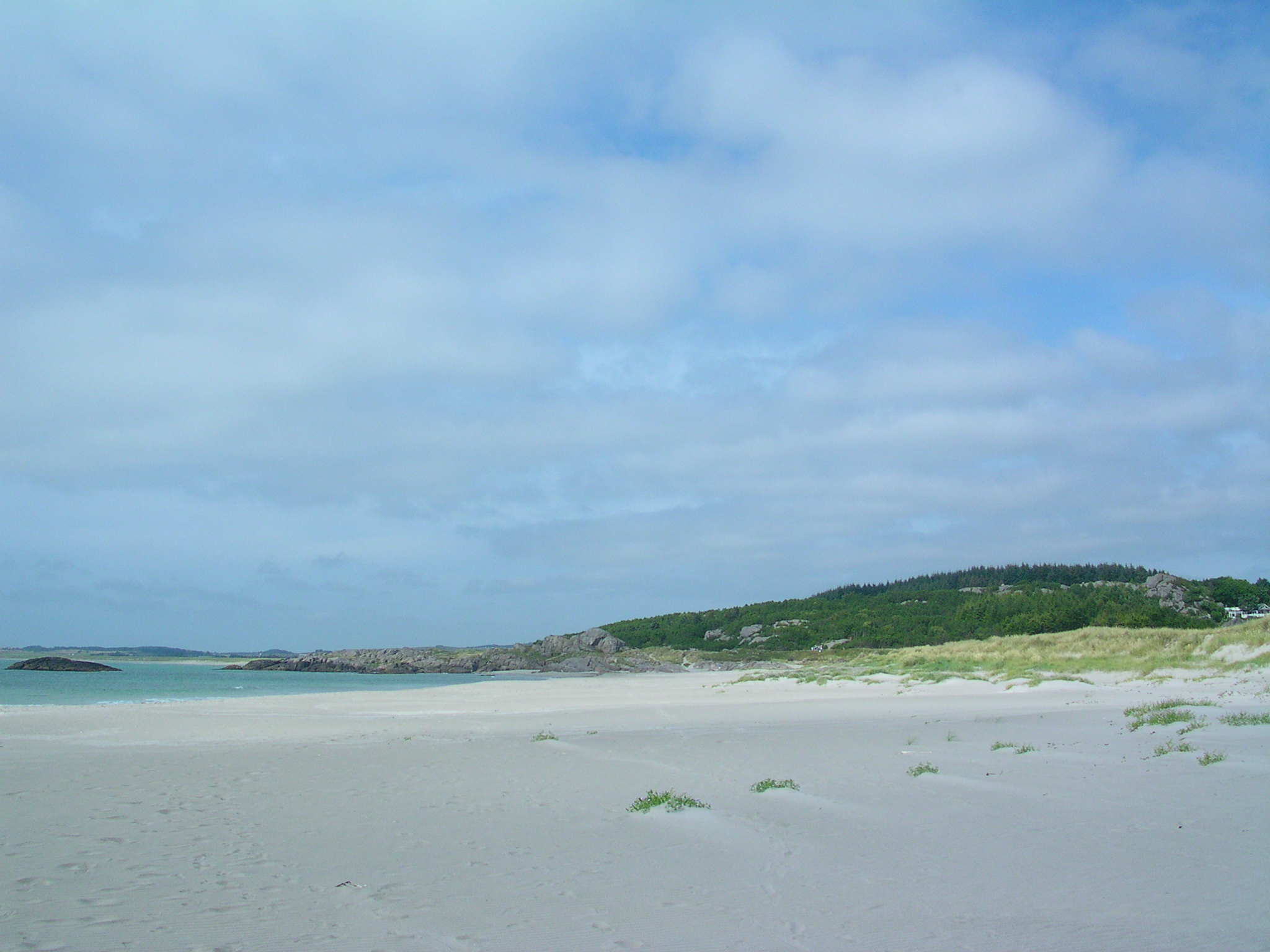
Sandy beaches at Ogna, in the southern part of the municipality.

The parish of Haa (later spelled Hå) was established as a municipality on 1 January 1838 (see formannskapsdistrikt law). In 1894, the old Haa Municipality was dissolved and divided into two new municipalities: the northern district (population: 1801) became the new Nærbø Municipality and the southern district (population: 1806) became the new Varhaug Municipality.

During the 1960s, there were many municipal mergers across Norway due to the work of the Schei Committee. On 1 January 1964, the following areas were merged to form the new Hå Municipality (resurrecting the name of the old municipality that was dissolved in 1894):

- all of Nærbø Municipality (population: 3,926)
- all of Ogna Municipality (population: 1,470)
- all of Varhaug Municipality (population: 3,454)

In local politics, the divisions between the three previous municipalities remain very visible.

=== Name ===
The municipality (originally the parish) is named after the old Hå farm (Old Norse: Háar or Háir) where the local church priest's parsonage was located. The river running past this farm is similarly named the Hååna, meaning the "Hå river". It is not known if the river is named after the farm or vice versa. The meaning of the original name is uncertain. It is possible that it comes from the plural dative case of the word há which means "aftergrass" (the grass that grows after the first crop has been cut down). Ti may also come from the word hár which means "rowlock" (possibly referring to the shape of the headland on which the farm is located).

On 21 December 1917, a royal resolution enacted the 1917 Norwegian language reforms. Prior to this change, the name was spelled Haa with the digraph "aa", and after this reform, the name was spelled Hå, using the letter å instead.

=== Coat of arms ===
The coat of arms was granted on 5 July 1991. The official blazon is "Sable, a winch stand argent." (Norwegian: På svart grunn eit sølv vinsjestativ). This means the arms have a black field (background) and the charge is a winch stand. The winch stand has a tincture of argent which means it is commonly colored white, but if it is made out of metal, then silver is used. It is a special type of winch that has historically been used in this area to remove stones from the many farm fields. The arms were chosen to symbolize the hard living on the rocky soils of the municipality. A winch of this type (called a "steinbukk") is used locally for the removal of large stones from the soil for agricultural purposes. It's three legs also represent the three previous municipalities of Nærbø, Varhaug, and Ogna that were merged to create Hå Municipality in 1964. The municipal flag has the same design as the coat of arms.

=== Churches ===
The Church of Norway has three parishes (sokn) within Hå Municipality. It is part of the Jæren prosti (deanery) in the Diocese of Stavanger.

Churches in Hå Municipality
Parish (sokn)	Church name	Location of the church	Year built
Nærbø	Nærbø Church	Nærbø	2005
Nærbø	Old Nærbø Church	Nærbø	1834
Ogna	Ogna Church	Ogna	1250
Varhaug	Varhaug Church	Varhaug	1904

== Government ==
Hå Municipality is responsible for primary education (through 10th grade), outpatient health services, senior citizen services, welfare and other social services, zoning, economic development, and municipal roads and utilities. The municipality is governed by a municipal council of directly elected representatives. The mayor is indirectly elected by a vote of the municipal council. The municipality is under the jurisdiction of the Sør-Rogaland District Court and the Gulating Court of Appeal.

=== Municipal council ===
The municipal council (Kommunestyre) of Hå Municipality is made up of 33 representatives that are elected to four-year terms. The tables below show the current and historical composition of the council by political party.

Hå kommunestyre 2023–2027
Party name (in Norwegian)	Number of representatives
Labour Party (Arbeiderpartiet)	2
Progress Party (Fremskrittspartiet)	6
Conservative Party (Høyre)	7
Industry and Business Party (Industri‑ og Næringspartiet)	1
The Conservatives (Konservativt)	1
Christian Democratic Party (Kristelig Folkeparti)	8
Centre Party (Senterpartiet)	3
Socialist Left Party (Sosialistisk Venstreparti)	1
Hå List (Hå-lista)	4
Total number of members:	33

Hå kommunestyre 2019–2023
Party name (in Norwegian)	Number of representatives
Labour Party (Arbeiderpartiet)	3
Progress Party (Fremskrittspartiet)	3
Conservative Party (Høyre)	5
Christian Democratic Party (Kristelig Folkeparti)	7
Centre Party (Senterpartiet)	5
Socialist Left Party (Sosialistisk Venstreparti)	1
Hå List (Hå-lista)	9
Total number of members:	33

Hå kommunestyre 2015–2019
Party name (in Norwegian)	Number of representatives
Labour Party (Arbeiderpartiet)	3
Progress Party (Fremskrittspartiet)	3
Conservative Party (Høyre)	6
Christian Democratic Party (Kristelig Folkeparti)	7
Centre Party (Senterpartiet)	3
Nærbø List (Nærbølista)	10
Common list for southern Hå (Samlingsliste for søre Hå)	1
Total number of members:	33

Hå kommunestyre 2011–2015
Party name (in Norwegian)	Number of representatives
Labour Party (Arbeiderpartiet)	3
Progress Party (Fremskrittspartiet)	3
Conservative Party (Høyre)	7
Christian Democratic Party (Kristelig Folkeparti)	6
Centre Party (Senterpartiet)	3
Nærbø List (Nærbølista)	11
Total number of members:	33

Hå kommunestyre 2007–2011
Party name (in Norwegian)	Number of representatives
Labour Party (Arbeiderpartiet)	2
Progress Party (Fremskrittspartiet)	4
Conservative Party (Høyre)	3
Christian Democratic Party (Kristelig Folkeparti)	7
Centre Party (Senterpartiet)	4
Socialist Left Party (Sosialistisk Venstreparti)	1
Nærbø List (Nærbølista)	12
Total number of members:	33

Hå kommunestyre 2003–2007
Party name (in Norwegian)	Number of representatives
Labour Party (Arbeiderpartiet)	3
Progress Party (Fremskrittspartiet)	5
Conservative Party (Høyre)	4
Christian Democratic Party (Kristelig Folkeparti)	7
Centre Party (Senterpartiet)	6
Socialist Left Party (Sosialistisk Venstreparti)	2
Nærbø List (Nærbølista)	6
Total number of members:	33

Hå kommunestyre 1999–2003
Party name (in Norwegian)	Number of representatives
Labour Party (Arbeiderpartiet)	3
Progress Party (Fremskrittspartiet)	5
Conservative Party (Høyre)	6
Christian Democratic Party (Kristelig Folkeparti)	8
Centre Party (Senterpartiet)	7
Socialist Left Party (Sosialistisk Venstreparti)	2
Nærbø List (Nærbølista)	6
Total number of members:	37

Hå kommunestyre 1995–1999
Party name (in Norwegian)	Number of representatives
Labour Party (Arbeiderpartiet)	3
Progress Party (Fremskrittspartiet)	2
Conservative Party (Høyre)	4
Christian Democratic Party (Kristelig Folkeparti)	9
Centre Party (Senterpartiet)	10
Socialist Left Party (Sosialistisk Venstreparti)	1
Nærbø List (Nærbølisten)	8
Total number of members:	37

Hå kommunestyre 1991–1995
Party name (in Norwegian)	Number of representatives
Labour Party (Arbeiderpartiet)	3
Progress Party (Fremskrittspartiet)	1
Conservative Party (Høyre)	3
Christian Democratic Party (Kristelig Folkeparti)	8
Centre Party (Senterpartiet)	7
Socialist Left Party (Sosialistisk Venstreparti)	2
Nærbø List (Nærbølisten)	9
Varhaug local list (Varhaug bygdeliste)	2
Vigrestad local list (Vigrestad bygdeliste)	1
Ogna local list (Ogna bygdeliste)	1
Total number of members:	37

Hå kommunestyre 1987–1991
Party name (in Norwegian)	Number of representatives
Labour Party (Arbeiderpartiet)	3
Progress Party (Fremskrittspartiet)	1
Conservative Party (Høyre)	2
Christian Democratic Party (Kristelig Folkeparti)	7
Centre Party (Senterpartiet)	3
Socialist Left Party (Sosialistisk Venstreparti)	1
Joint list of the Liberal Party (Venstre) and Liberal People's Party (Liberale Folkepartiet)	1
Nærbø List (Nærbølisten)	10
Varhaug local list (Varhaug bygdeliste)	4
Vigrestad local list (Vigrestad bygdeliste)	2
Ogna local list (Ogna bygdeliste)	2
Nærbø Non-partisan Common List (Nærbø Upolitiske Samlingsliste)	1
Total number of members:	37

Hå kommunestyre 1983–1987
Party name (in Norwegian)	Number of representatives
Labour Party (Arbeiderpartiet)	3
Conservative Party (Høyre)	2
Christian Democratic Party (Kristelig Folkeparti)	6
Liberal People's Party (Liberale Folkepartiet)	1
Socialist Left Party (Sosialistisk Venstreparti)	1
Nærbø List (Nærbølisten)	10
Varhaug local list (Varhaug bygdeliste)	7
Vigrestad local list (Vigrestad bygdeliste)	4
Ogna local list (Ogna bygdeliste)	3
Total number of members:	37

Hå kommunestyre 1979–1983
Party name (in Norwegian)	Number of representatives
Labour Party (Arbeiderpartiet)	3
Conservative Party (Høyre)	5
Christian Democratic Party (Kristelig Folkeparti)	7
Nærbø List (Nærbølisten)	11
Varhaug local list (Varhaug bygdeliste)	5
Vigrestad local list (Vigrestad bygdeliste)	3
Ogna local list (Ogna bygdeliste)	3
Total number of members:	37

Hå kommunestyre 1975–1979
Party name (in Norwegian)	Number of representatives
Labour Party (Arbeiderpartiet)	1
Conservative Party (Høyre)	1
Christian Democratic Party (Kristelig Folkeparti)	5
Nærbø List (Nærbølisten)	14
Varhaug local list (Varhaug bygdeliste)	8
Vigrestad local list (Vigrestad bygdeliste)	5
Ogna local list (Ogna bygdeliste)	3
Total number of members:	37

Hå kommunestyre 1971–1975
Party name (in Norwegian)	Number of representatives
Labour Party (Arbeiderpartiet)	5
Conservative Party (Høyre)	1
Christian Democratic Party (Kristelig Folkeparti)	7
Centre Party (Senterpartiet)	9
Liberal Party (Venstre)	2
Local List(s) (Lokale lister)	13
Total number of members:	37

Hå kommunestyre 1967–1971
Party name (in Norwegian)	Number of representatives
Labour Party (Arbeiderpartiet)	3
Christian Democratic Party (Kristelig Folkeparti)	4
Liberal Party (Venstre)	4
Local List(s) (Lokale lister)	26
Total number of members:	37

Hå kommunestyre 1964–1967
Party name (in Norwegian)	Number of representatives
Labour Party (Arbeiderpartiet)	4
Local List(s) (Lokale lister)	33
Total number of members:	37
Note: On 1 January 1964, Ogna Municipality, Nærbø Municipality, and Varhaug Municipality were merged to form the new Hå Municipality.

=== Mayors ===
The mayor (Norwegian: ordfører) of Hå Municipality is the political leader of the municipality and the chairperson of the municipal council. The following people have held this position:

- 1838–1839: Helge Olsen Aanestad
- 1840–1841: Ingebret Olsen Gausland
- 1842–1845: Helge Olsen Aanestad
- 1846–1849: Ingebret Olsen Gausland
- 1850–1853: Tosten Tobias Obrestad
- 1854–1855: Ingebret Olsen Gausland
- 1856–1857: Svend Olsen Haaland
- 1858–1859: Christian R. Skrettingland
- 1860–1863: Svend Olsen Haaland
- 1864–1867: Tosten Tobias Obrestad
- 1868–1869: Erik Tostensen Hobberstad
- 1870–1871: Tosten Tobias Obrestad
- 1872–1877: Svend Olsen Haaland
- 1878–1879: Ingebret Ingebretsen Gausland
- 1880–1883: Tosten Tobias Obrestad
- 1884–1893: Ingebret Ingebretsen Gausland
- (1894–1963: Hå Municipality did not exist.)
- 1964–1967: Erik Årsland (LL)
- 1968–1969: Erik P. Skretting (LL)
- 1970–1975: Kjell Lund (LL)
- 1976–1979: Kåre Sandve (KrF)
- 1980–1983: Gabriel S. Rimestad (LL)
- 1984–1985: Mindor Jelsa (LL)
- 1986–1987: Rasmus Pollestad (KrF)
- 1988–1989: Kjell Lund (Ap)
- 1990–1991: Eldar Odland (LL)
- 1992–1993: Ingvar Gausland (LL)
- 1994–1995: Tobias Skretting (Sp)
- 1995–1999: Eldar Odland (Sp)
- 1999–2003: Gunnar Siqveland (H)
- 2003–2011: Terje Mjåtveit (LL)
- 2011–2015: Mons Skrettingland (H)
- 2015–2023: Jonas Skrettingland (KrF)
- 2023–present: Andreas Bjorland (KrF)

== Population ==
Historical population
Year	1855	1865	1875	1891	1894	1964	1970	1980	1990	2000	2010	2020	2025
Pop.	2,859	3,004	3,218	3,409	3,607	8,850	9,978	12,290	13,034	13,921	16,342	18,991	20,067
±% p.a.	—	+0.50%	+0.69%	+0.36%	+1.90%	+1.29%	+2.02%	+2.11%	+0.59%	+0.66%	+1.62%	+1.51%	+1.11%
Note: The municipality was dissolved in 1894 and it was recreated in 1964. Source: Statistics Norway and Norwegian Historical Data Centre

== Geography ==
Hå Municipality is located on the southwestern shore of Norway, along the North Sea. The municipality is located mostly in the very flat, coastal Jæren district. The southeastern part of the municipality begins to get a little hilly and rocky and it marks the border of the Dalane district (located to the south and east). The highest point in the municipality is the 416.1-metre (1,365 ft) tall mountain Brusaknuden. Much of the land in Hå Municipality is used for agriculture because of its flat landscape. The river Hååna runs through the municipality. The shoreline of the municipality is marked by the Kvassheim Lighthouse and Obrestad Lighthouse.

Klepp Municipality is located to the northwest, Time Municipality is located to the north, Bjerkreim Municipality is located to the east, Eigersund Municipality is located to the southeast, and the North Sea is located to the southwest.

=== Settlements ===
List of the largest villages in Hå
Name	Population	Area (km^{2})	Population density per km^{2}
Brusand	428	0.2	2,140
Hæen	588	0.43	1,367
Nærbø	6,995	3.28	2,133
Ogna	360	0.31	1,161
Sirevåg	627	0.7	896
Varhaug	3,114	1.57	1,983
Vigrestad	2,116	1.18	1,793

=== Climate ===
Hå has a temperate oceanic climate (Cfb), also known as marine west coast climate. The average date for the last overnight freeze (low below 0 °C (32.0 °F)) in spring is 16 April and average date for first freeze in autumn is 10 November giving a frost-free season of 207 days (1981-2010 average).

Climate data for Obrestad Lighthouse 1991-2020 (24 m)
Month	Jan	Feb	Mar	Apr	May	Jun	Jul	Aug	Sep	Oct	Nov	Dec	Year
Mean daily maximum °C (°F)	4.5 (40.1)	3.9 (39.0)	5.2 (41.4)	8.4 (47.1)	11.5 (52.7)	14 (57)	16.8 (62.2)	17.6 (63.7)	15.1 (59.2)	11.4 (52.5)	7.9 (46.2)	5.5 (41.9)	10.2 (50.3)
Daily mean °C (°F)	2.8 (37.0)	2 (36)	3.1 (37.6)	5.9 (42.6)	9.1 (48.4)	11.7 (53.1)	14.3 (57.7)	15.1 (59.2)	12.9 (55.2)	9.2 (48.6)	5.9 (42.6)	3.6 (38.5)	8.0 (46.4)
Mean daily minimum °C (°F)	0.4 (32.7)	−0.3 (31.5)	1 (34)	3.4 (38.1)	6.5 (43.7)	9.5 (49.1)	12.2 (54.0)	12.7 (54.9)	10.6 (51.1)	6.9 (44.4)	3.6 (38.5)	1.1 (34.0)	5.6 (42.2)
Average precipitation mm (inches)	132 (5.2)	100 (3.9)	88 (3.5)	67 (2.6)	64 (2.5)	67 (2.6)	88 (3.5)	127 (5.0)	130 (5.1)	155 (6.1)	152 (6.0)	130 (5.1)	1,309 (51.5)
Average precipitation days (≥ 1 mm)	15.0	11.2	13.3	11.2	11.5	10.7	11.4	13.9	16.6	17.5	18.3	16.6	167.2
Source 1: yr.no/Norwegian Meteorological Institute (mean, precipitation]
Source 2: NOAA-WMO averages 91-2020 Norway

== Transportation ==
The Sørlandet Line runs through the municipality, making several stops. The stations in Hå include Brusand Station, Nærbø Station, Ogna Station, Sirevåg Station, Varhaug Station, and Vigrestad Station.

== Notable people ==
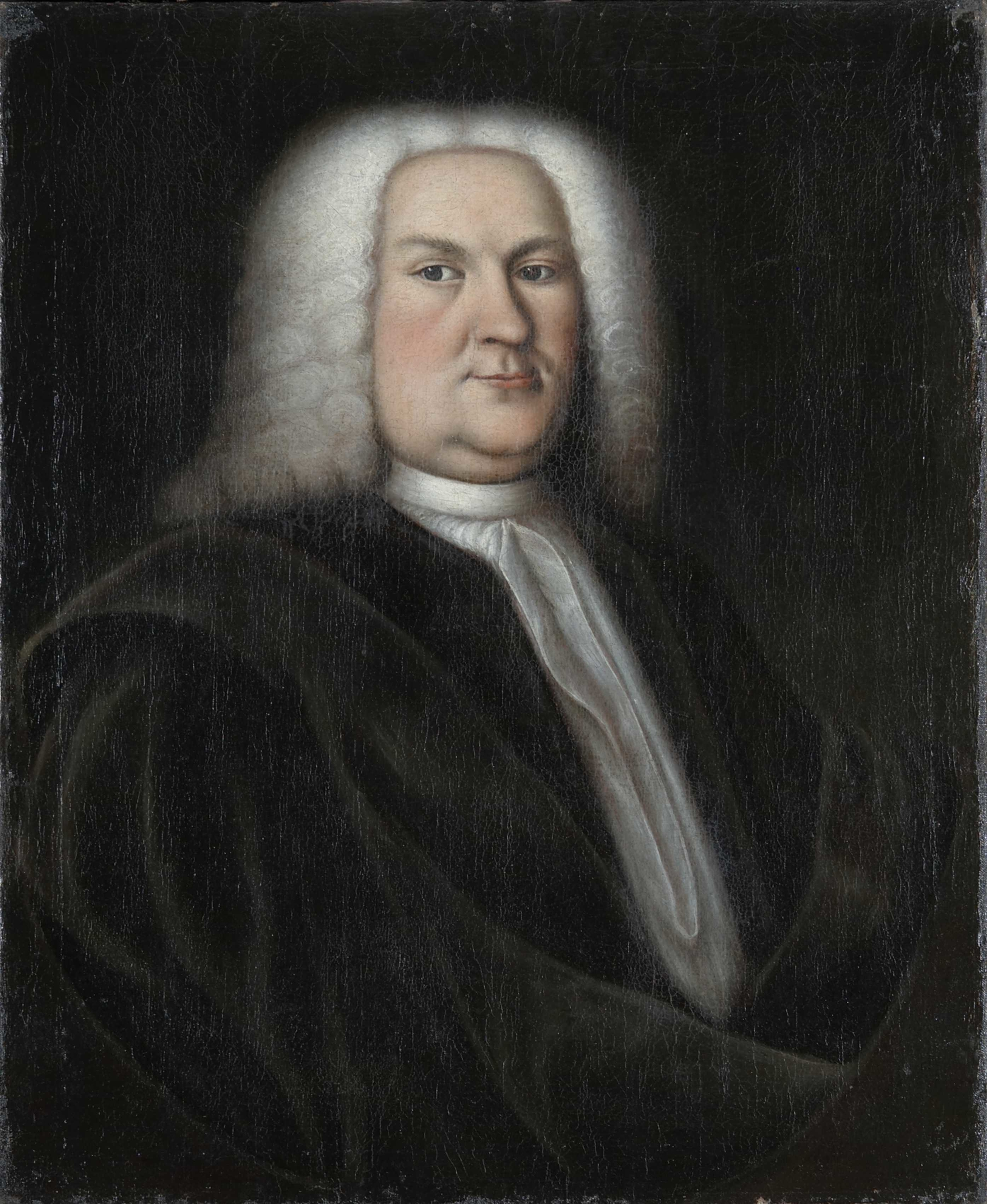
Jacob Rasch

- Jacob Rasch (1669 in Ogna – 1737), the rector of Christiania Cathedral School from 1706 to 1737
- Sven Aarrestad (1850 in Varhaug – 1942), a writer, politician, and leader in the Norwegian temperance movement
- Tor Obrestad (1938 in Hå – 2020), a novelist, poet, and documentary writer
- Gunnar Torvund (1948 in Nærbø – 2019), a sculptor
- Kjell Arild Pollestad (born 1949 in Hå), an author, theologian, philologist, and Dominican priest
- Magnus Matningsdal (born 1951 in Hå), a judge and a Supreme Court Justice from 1997
- Helge Torvund (born 1951 in Hå), a psychologist, poet, literary critic, and children's writer
- Geir Pollestad (born 1978 in Høyland), a politician and government minister
- Vidar Nisja (born 1986 in Vigrestad), a football midfielder with 324 club caps
