= Ogna Station =

Railway station in Hå, Norway

Ogna
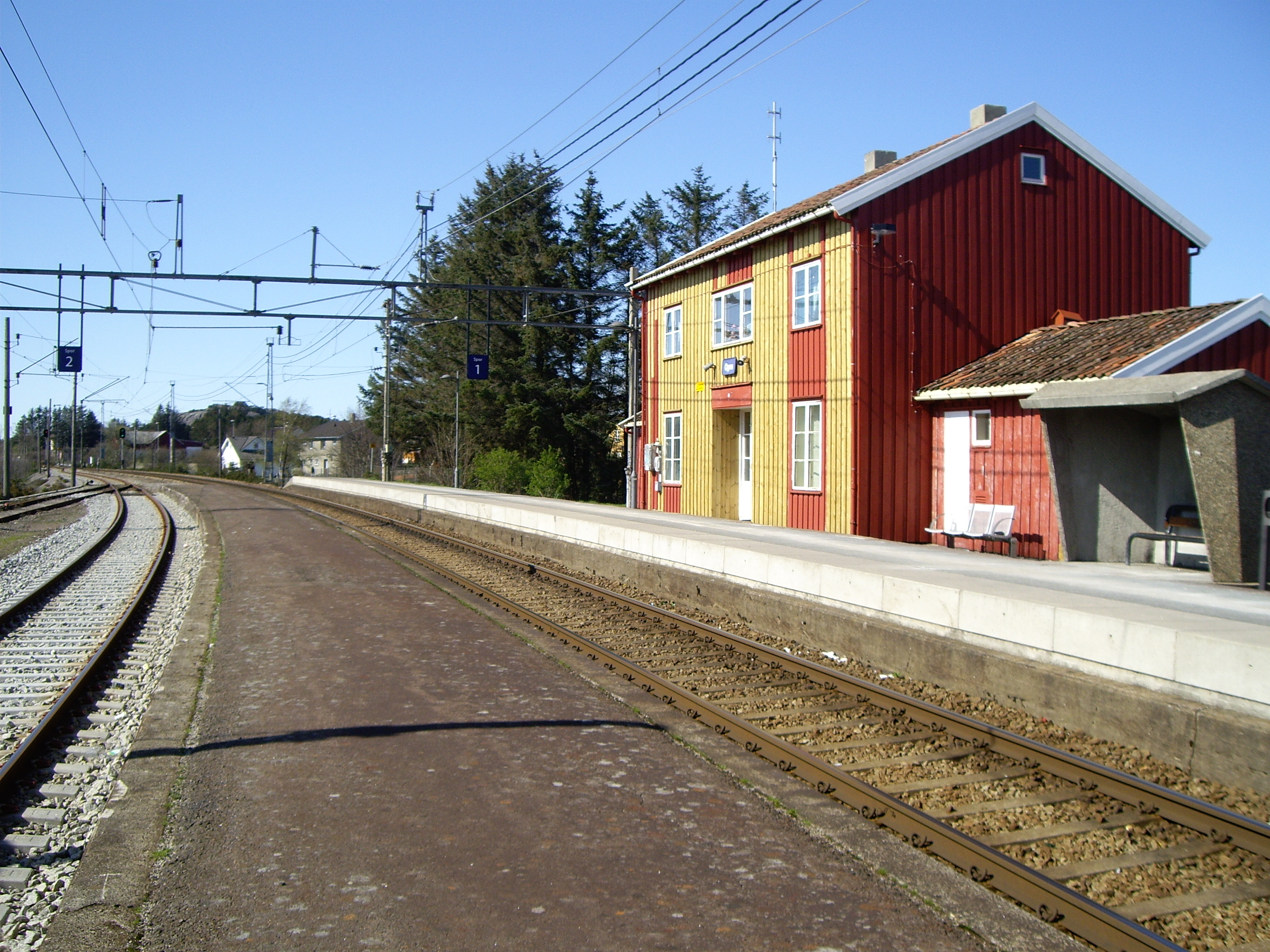

General information
- Location: Ogna, Hå Municipality; Norway
- Coordinates: 58°31′11.24″N 5°48′11.7″E
- Elevation: 4.4 m (14 ft)
- Owner: Norwegian National Rail Administration
- Operator: Go-Ahead Norge
- Line: Sørlandet Line
- Distance: 540.84 km (336.06 mi)
- Platforms: 1
- Connections: Bus: Kolumbus

History
- Opened: 1878
Location

Ogna Station (Norwegian: Ogna stasjon) is a railway station located at Ogna in Hå Municipality, Norway on the Sørland Line. The station is served by the Jæren Commuter Rail between Stavanger and Egersund. The station is 58.41 kilometres (36.29 mi) south of the city of Stavanger. The station was opened in 1878. Prior to 1919, the name was spelled Ogne.

Preceding station	Local trains	Following station
Brusand towards Stavanger	L5 Jæren Commuter Rail	Sirevåg towards Egersund
