= Brusand =

Village in Hå Municipality, Norway

- Village
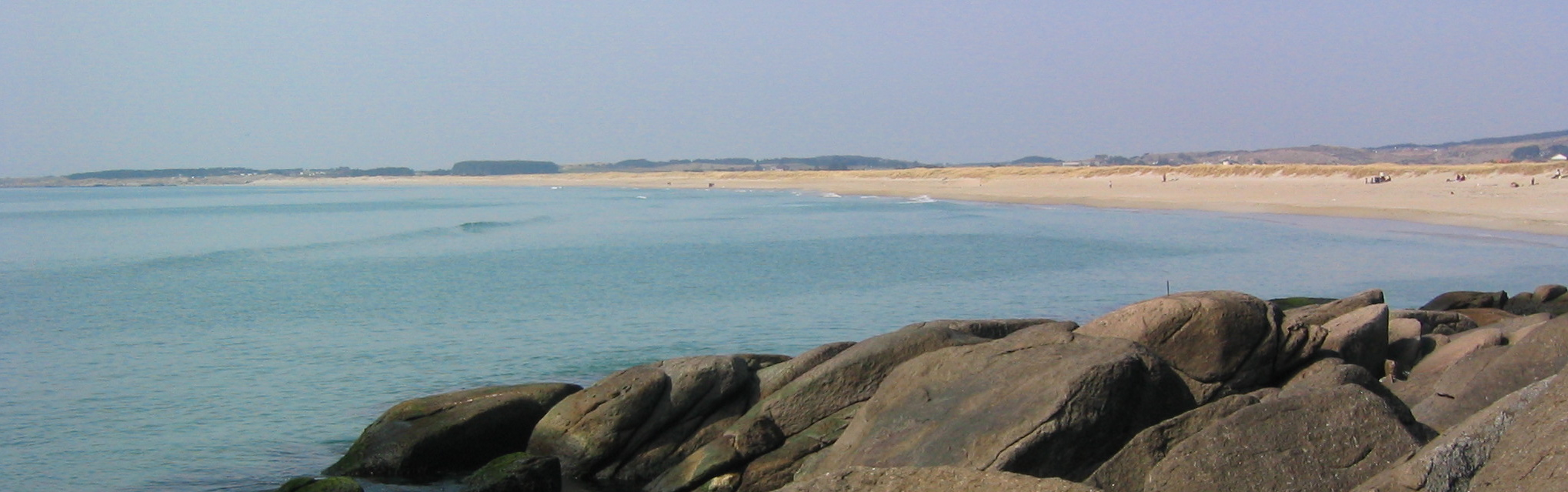
- View of the village beach
- Interactive map of Brusand
- Coordinates: 58.54063°N 5.74463°E
- Country: Norway
- Region: Western Norway
- County: Rogaland
- District: Jæren
- Municipality: Hå Municipality

Area
  - Total: 0.19 km^{2} (0.073 sq mi)
- Elevation: 3 m (9.8 ft)

Population (2025)
  - Total: 451
  - Density: 2,374/km^{2} (6,150/sq mi)
- Time zone: UTC+01:00 (CET)
  - Summer (DST): UTC+02:00 (CEST)
- Post Code: 4363 Brusand

Brusand is a village in Hå Municipality in Rogaland county, Norway. The small village is located on a small isthmus of land between the lake Bjåvatnet and the North Sea. The village sits along the Sørlandet Line (traditionally called the Jæren Line) and it is served by the Jæren Commuter Rail which stops at the Brusand Station. The village is about 4 kilometres (2.5 mi) southeast of the village of Vigrestad and about 5 kilometres (3.1 mi) northwest of the villages of Ogna and Sirevåg.

Brusand is located next to the large Brusandstranda beach which has a nice sandy beach, plus a good-sized area of sand dunes. There is also a camping site near the shore. The 0.19-square-kilometre (47-acre) village has a population (2025) of 451 and a population density of 2,374 inhabitants per square kilometre (6,150/sq mi).

== Hitler's teeth ==
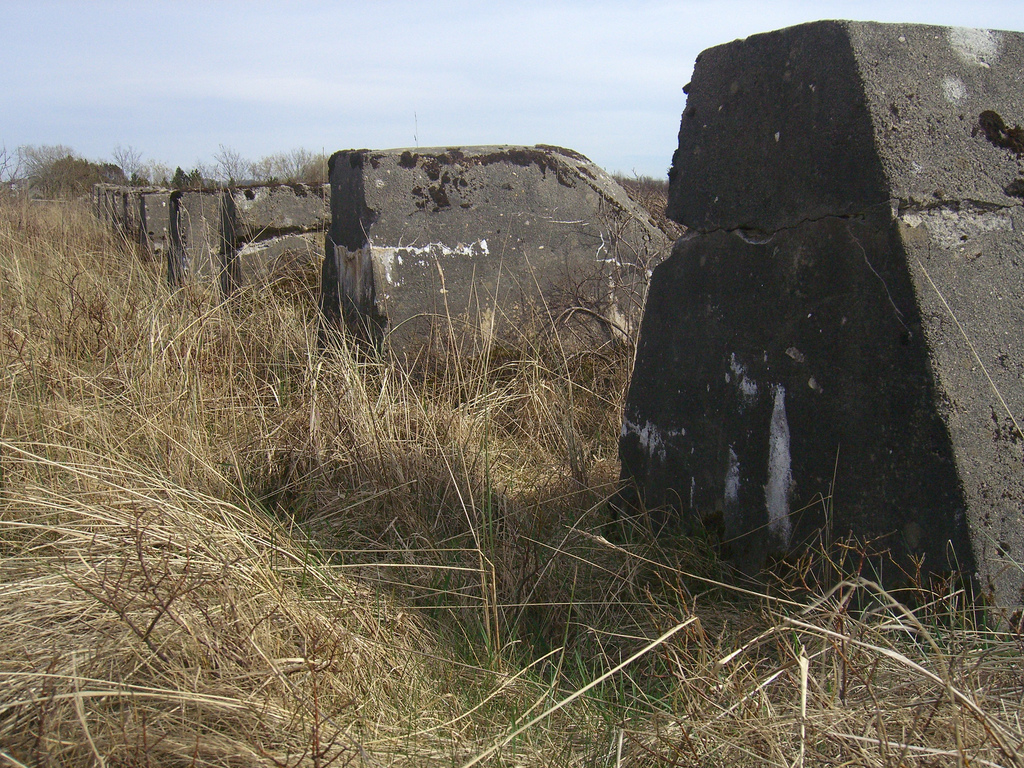
Hitler's teeth

On the south side of Brusand, just across the highway, one can still see the anti-tank obstacles erected along the coastline during World War II. These are called Hitler's teeth (Norwegian: Hitlertennene or Hitlers tenner), and they were erected by prisoners of war and other forced laborers, in order to stop an allied invasion of Norway during the Nazi occupation from 1940 to 1945.

The Germans found it likely that an allied assault would happen on the beaches of Jæren, both for its close proximity to United Kingdom and because of the topography. They are made of stone and concrete and run for several kilometers with up to 4 rows of obstacles. The Norwegian prisoners sabotaged several "teeth" by mixing more sand into the concrete in order to make them weaker.
