= Ogna =

Village in Hå Municipality, Norway

- Village
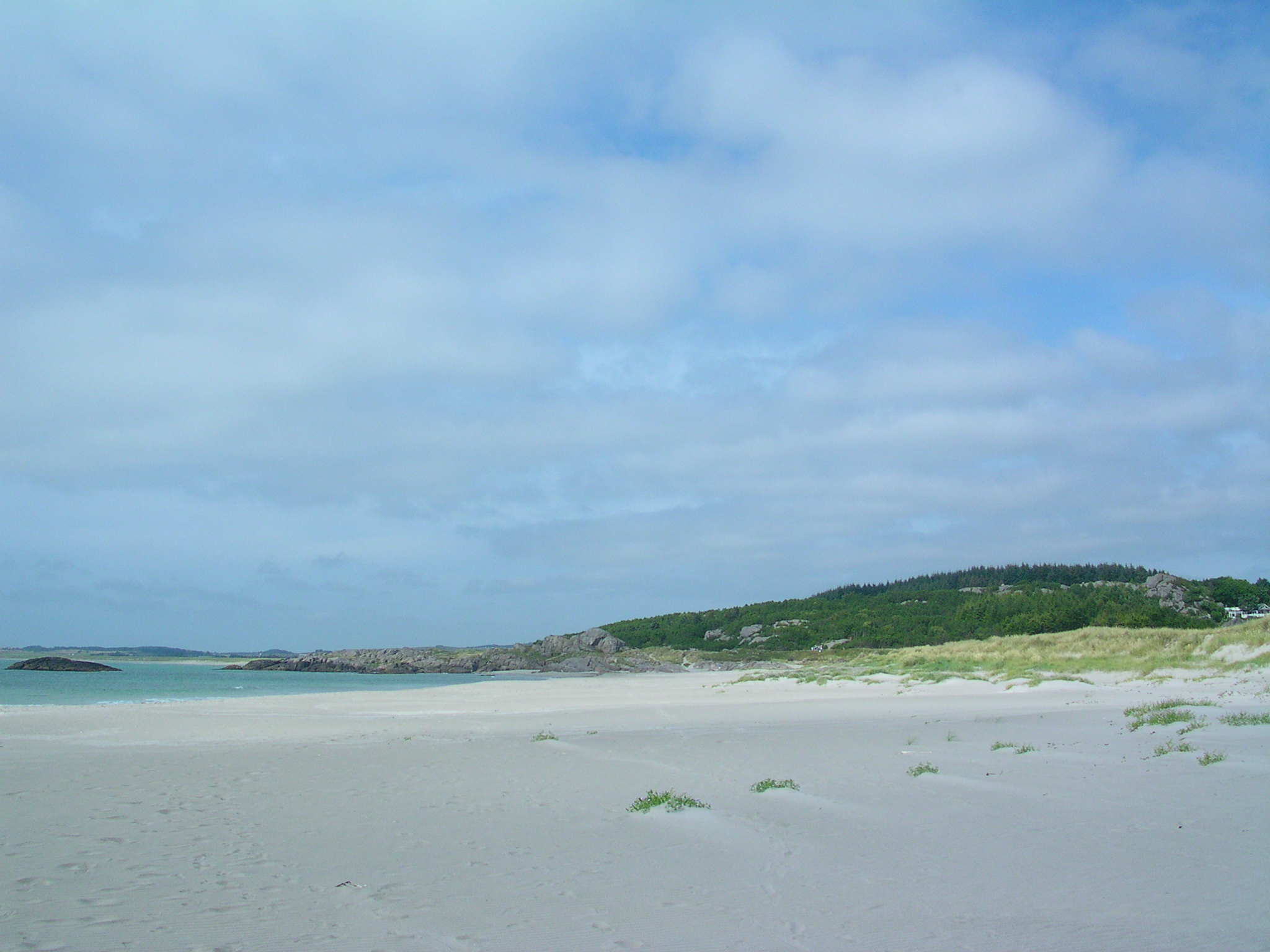
- View of the local beach
- Interactive map of Ogna
- Coordinates: 58.51527°N 5.8092°E
- Country: Norway
- Region: Western Norway
- County: Rogaland
- District: Jæren
- Municipality: Hå Municipality

Area
  - Total: 0.26 km^{2} (0.10 sq mi)
- Elevation: 2 m (6.6 ft)

Population (2025)
  - Total: 382
  - Density: 1,469/km^{2} (3,800/sq mi)
- Time zone: UTC+01:00 (CET)
  - Summer (DST): UTC+02:00 (CEST)
- Post Code: 4364 Sirevåg

Ogna is a village in Hå Municipality in Rogaland county, Norway. The village is located immediately north of the village of Sirevåg on the shores of the Ognaelva river. The village was the administrative centre of the old Ogna Municipality which existed before 1964. The village is the site of Ogna Station, a railway station along the Sørlandet Line.

The 0.26-square-kilometre (64-acre) village has a population (2025) of 382 and a population density of 1,469 inhabitants per square kilometre (3,800/sq mi).

Ogna is the site of the centuries-old Ogna Church. The little church, which dates back to the Middle Ages, was restored and added to after a fire in 1991. It is often open in the summer for visitors. Ogna also has beautiful sand beaches, and salmon fishing is very popular in the nearby river. Norwegian County Road 44, which also forms the tourist route known as the North Sea Road, passes through the village.
