= Varhaug =

Village in Hå Municipality, Norway

- Village
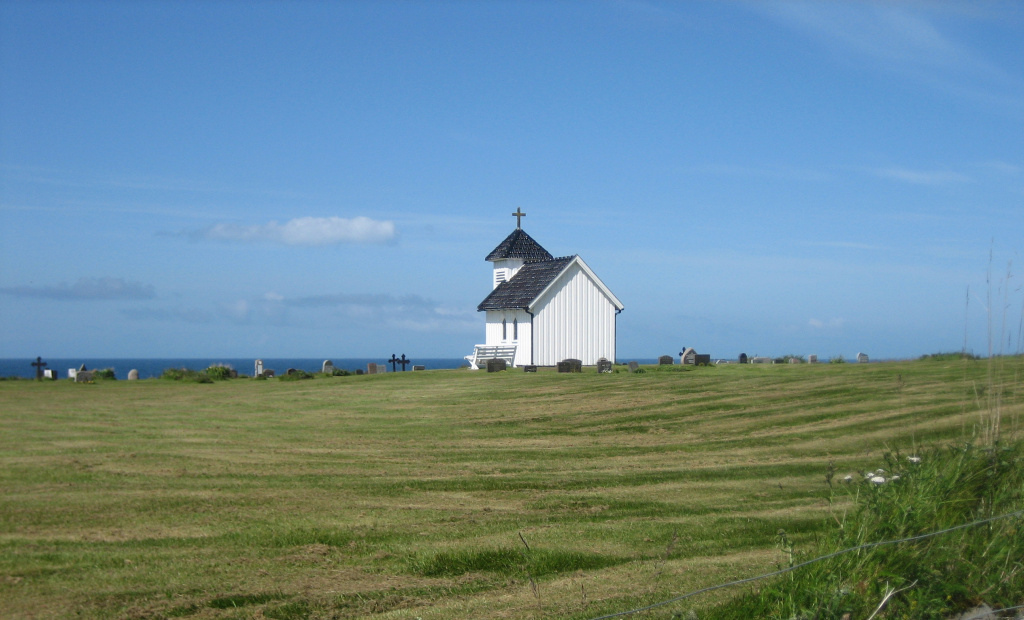
- View of the old village church and graveyard
- Interactive map of Varhaug
- Coordinates: 58.61876°N 5.64465°E
- Country: Norway
- Region: Western Norway
- County: Rogaland
- District: Jæren
- Municipality: Hå Municipality

Area
  - Total: 1.52 km^{2} (0.59 sq mi)
- Elevation: 44 m (144 ft)

Population (2025)
  - Total: 3,391
  - Density: 2,231/km^{2} (5,780/sq mi)
- Time zone: UTC+01:00 (CET)
  - Summer (DST): UTC+02:00 (CEST)
- Post Code: 4360 Varhaug

Varhaug is the administrative centre of Hå Municipality in Rogaland county, Norway. The village is located in the district of Jæren and it is the second largest village in Hå Municipality after Nærbø. It was also the administrative centre for the former Varhaug Municipality from 1894 until its dissolution in 1964.

The village was founded in the late 19th century and expanded during the 20th century around the local railway station: Varhaug Station. Varhaug lies approximately 2 kilometres (1.2 mi) from the North Sea coastline. The village of Varhaug lies between the two neighbouring villages of Nærbø and Vigrestad, and the people live in a "love-hate relationship" with these villages. There are no one that are more important to beat in a football match.

The official demonym for a person coming from the village is Varhaugsbu. An unofficial but friendly nickname for people from Varhaug is Trausk (pl: Trausker). Trausk is a word from Jæren, meaning Frog or Toad. The nickname is decades old, and all local villages had one, though Varhaug's nickname is one of the few still somewhat in use. Other words describing a person from Varhaug can be Håbu or Jærbu.

With an elevation of between 40 and 60 metres (130 and 200 ft), Varhaug is the highest elevated village in the municipality.

The future development of Varhaug is uncertain. Agricultural land protection is a hot topic in the local newspapers since the farm land is so important to the nations food supply. The future policy of the Norwegian Government will decide how much the villages of Jæren are allowed to expand in the future. Maybe high-rise buildings are the answer, maybe Norway decides to rely more on foreign food production or perhaps there will be new villages established east of the prime agricultural land.

== History ==
Before Varhaug Station was opened in 1878 as a part of the Jæren Line, there was basically only farms in the area. When the train station was built, a lot of services were located near the station, and people started settling down around the station.

=== Origin of the name ===
The name of the village is derived from a farm with the same name, located closer to the sea. It is uncertain why this name was chosen for the train station, but the farms close to the sea have traditionally been wealthy and important in Jæren. Varhaug is a word with two elements, the latter "haug" is from the Old Norse word haugr and refers in this case to a tumulus. The first "Var" is believed to be Old Norse meaning "stone made".

Varhaug became the approved name for the village in 1958 by the Norwegian Mapping and Cadastre Authority, though it had been in use long before this.

== Population development ==
Historical population

Year	Pop.	±%
2000	2,140	—
2001	2,189	+2.3%
2002	2,283	+4.3%
2003	2,325	+1.8%
2004	2,376	+2.2%
2005	2,484	+4.5%
2006	2,489	+0.2%
2007	2,494	+0.2%

Year	Pop.	±%
2008	2,520	+1.0%
2009	2,619	+3.9%
2010	2,685	+2.5%
2011	2,766	+3.0%
2012	2,857	+3.3%
2013	3,002	+5.1%
2014	3,073	+2.4%
2015	3,114	+1.3%

Year	Pop.	±%
2016	3,162	+1.5%
2017	3,238	+2.4%
2018	3,241	+0.1%
2019	3,239	−0.1%
2020	3,283	+1.4%
2025	3,391	+3.3%

From 2013, Statistics Norway changed the definition for urban settlements, reducing the area of Varhaug from 1.67 square kilometres (0.64 sq mi) in 2012 to 1.56 square kilometres (0.60 sq mi) in 2013. This may have influenced the population change from 2012 to 2013. These numbers are for the continuous built up area only, and does not include the surrounding farms. Since there are no official data for 2001 and 2010, these numbers are estimated using interpolation with municipality growth these years.
Source: Statistics Norway.

The 1.52-square-kilometre (380-acre) village has a population (2025) of 3,391 and a population density of 2,231 inhabitants per square kilometre (5,780/sq mi). The population has been more or less steadily growing ever since Varhaug Station was opened in 1878. Statistics Norway publish population numbers for every large village but only provides detailed information at the municipality level. Hå Municipality has always ranked high on fertility rate compared to the Norwegian average. There is no demographic or geographic factors that indicates that the numbers for the municipality is not representative for the village. In 2008, about two-thirds of the population increase in Hå Municipality was from new settlers, the rest was from population growth within. Due to the heavy population increase in Nærbø, it's believed that this number is a bit lower in Varhaug. Still there has been a significant number of asylum seekers, foreign workers and Norwegians from other municipalities settling down in the village.

== Climate ==
The village is located middle of Jæren, which is one of the mildest areas in Norway. This and the flat landscape makes it very suitable for agriculture, compared to other parts of Norway. The flat landscape however makes it pretty windy sometimes. There are normally only a few weeks every year when there is snow. Precipitation is typically about 1,270 millimetres (50 in) per year and the average temperature is 7.2 °C (45.0 °F). Temperatures have tended to be higher in more recent years.

Climate data for Varhaug
Month	Jan	Feb	Mar	Apr	May	Jun	Jul	Aug	Sep	Oct	Nov	Dec	Year
Daily mean °C (°F)	0.6 (33.1)	0.4 (32.7)	2.3 (36.1)	5.2 (41.4)	9.5 (49.1)	12.7 (54.9)	14.0 (57.2)	14.3 (57.7)	11.7 (53.1)	8.7 (47.7)	4.7 (40.5)	2.2 (36.0)	7.2 (45.0)
Average precipitation mm (inches)	107 (4.2)	75 (3.0)	88 (3.5)	60 (2.4)	70 (2.8)	73 (2.9)	92 (3.6)	114 (4.5)	154 (6.1)	162 (6.4)	155 (6.1)	120 (4.7)	1,270 (50.0)
Source: Norwegian Meteorological Institute

== Economy ==
Traditionally, agriculture has been the backbone of the villages economy. But as the village has grown, it gradually becomes less important. Agriculture is still important for all the farms around the village, and the farmers are still being important customers for the shops in the village. The Jæren region has traditionally been and still is well known for the good and hard working craftsmen.

The biggest employer in Hå municipality is the municipality itself. Most of these workplaces are spread around in the municipality, but the administration is located in this village, meaning it is one of the most important workplaces in Varhaug. Another big employer in Varhaug is Fjordkjøkken AS, a company specializing in producing prefabricated dinner meals for the Norwegian brand Fjordland.

Many people from the village has jobs in the larger nearby cities of Stavanger, Sandnes, and Bryne. However, Hå municipality is trying to create more jobs locally, such as the food industry park in Kviamarka.

== Transportation ==
The Sørlandet Line, traditionally the Jæren Line, runs through the village, with the Jæren Commuter Rail serving Varhaug Station. Because of the hourly train service, there are not other scheduled bus services than school buses. County Road 44 is the main road along the coast between Stavanger and Egersund. County Road 504 connects Varhaug and County Road 44 to the European route E39 highway.

== Education ==
Varhaug has one elementary school, Varhaug School, and one lower secondary school, Varhaug Lower Secondary School. There are no upper secondary schools in Varhaug. Varhaug skule was opened in 1958 and combined the school houses of Auestad, Lerbrekk, Odland, Ualand and Ånestad. Varhaug ungdomsskule was constructed in the mid-1980s. Before this the youth had traveled to Vigrestad to go to lower secondary school.

== Sports ==
Most competitive sports are arranged through Varhaug Idrettslag.

Approximately 6 kilometres east of Varhaug is the motorcycle speedway and motocross stadium known as Elgane. The facility is run by the Motorsykkel Elgane Klubb and is one of Norway's leading motorcycle speedway venues and has held multiple international events.

== Media ==
Varhaugbuen is a local printed magazine coming out four times a year. The magazine have articles about local history, upcoming or recent happenings or about people from the village. Varhaugbuen is distributed freely to all households in Varhaug, but is also available for free online at varhaugbuen.no.
