= Vigrestad =

Village in Hå Municipality, Norway

- Village
- Interactive map of Vigrestad
- Coordinates: 58.5675°N 5.69553°E
- Country: Norway
- Region: Western Norway
- County: Rogaland
- District: Jæren
- Municipality: Hå Municipality

Area
  - Total: 1.19 km^{2} (0.46 sq mi)
- Elevation: 34 m (112 ft)

Population (2025)
  - Total: 2,159
  - Density: 1,814/km^{2} (4,700/sq mi)
- Time zone: UTC+01:00 (CET)
  - Summer (DST): UTC+02:00 (CEST)
- Post Code: 4362 Vigrestad

Vigrestad is a village in Hå Municipality in Rogaland county, Norway. The village is located about 2 kilometres (1.2 mi) northeast of the southwestern coast of Norway, facing the North Sea. The village sits about 7.5 kilometres (4.7 mi) southeast of the village of Varhaug and about 3 kilometres (1.9 mi) northwest of the villages of Hæen and Brusand.

Vigrestad Station is located on the Sørland Line, which runs through the village. The station is unstaffed and only local trains stop there, not express or regional ones.

The 1.19-square-kilometre (290-acre) village has a population (2025) of 2,159 and a population density of 1,814 inhabitants per square kilometre (4,700/sq mi).

== Name ==
The name probably has its origin from the word vig meaning "battle" or "war", and stad meaning "place". There is therefore reason to believe that it was the site of a battle. The name could alternatively originate from the Old Norse word "vigr" which means "spear". North of the village there are several barrows from the Iron Age and Bronze Age.

Vigrestad has been spelled in various ways over the centuries: Wirestad, Virestadt, Wiresteid in 1567, Vigrist in 1606, Wigresta in 1610, Vigrestad in 1616, and Wigrestad in 1723.

== Economy ==
The main source of income in Vigrestad is agriculture; mainly dairy, beef, pork, sheep, and potatoes. There are also companies that specialise in high-class timber furniture (for the Royal family, among others), and laser-cutting. A variety of industries and companies can also be found, many of them at Stokkalandsmarka, just southeast of Vigrestad.

== Notable people ==
- Elin Hetland Mong, a local politician for the party Høyre and was leader of the union Norsk Ergoterapeutforbund
- Monica Sandve, a handball player, National team, and Nordstrand (in the top league)
- Enevald Flåten, a pastor in Levende Ord Bibelsenter
