= Sirevåg =

Village in Hå Municipality, Norway

- Village
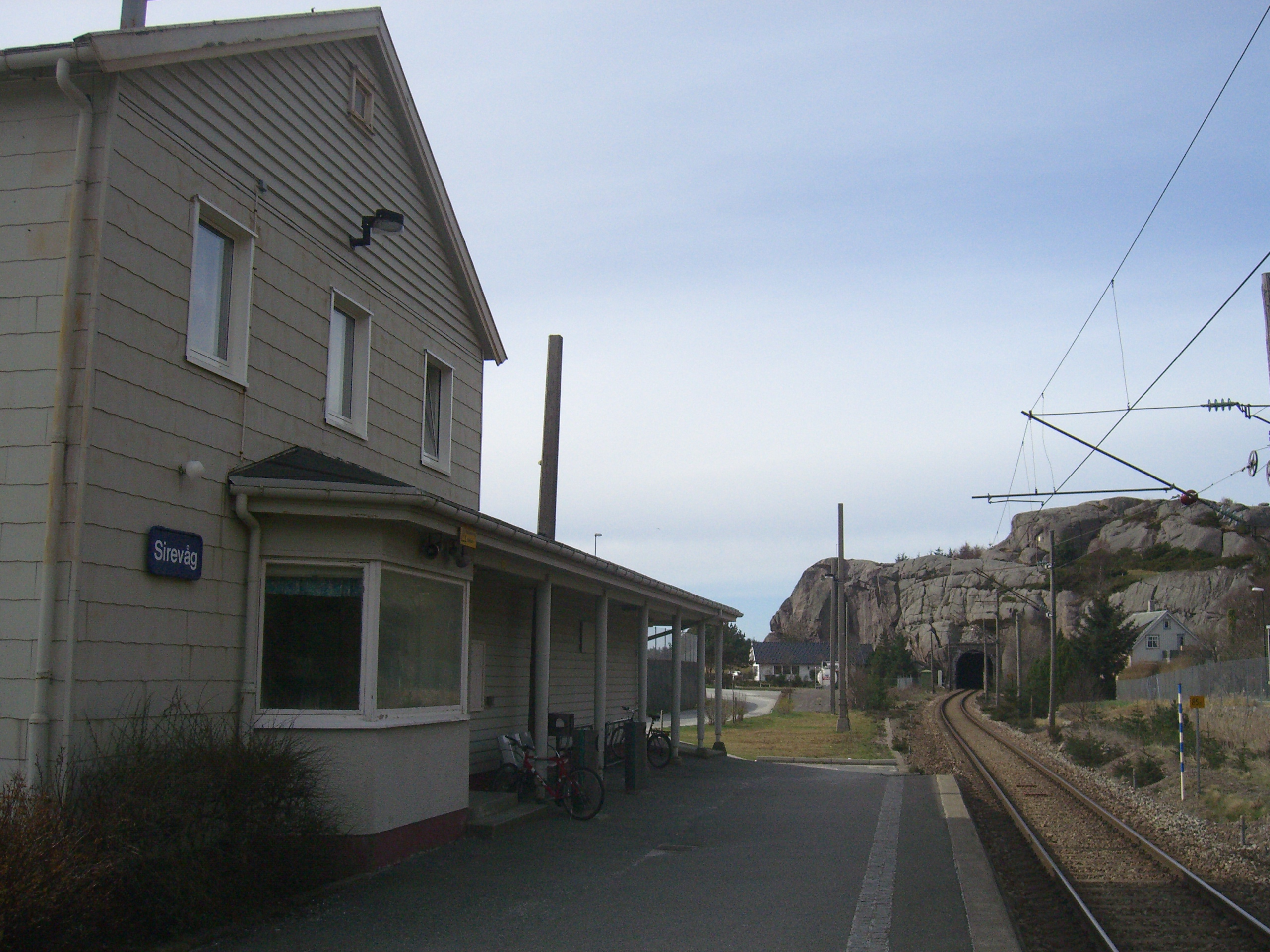
- View of the village railway station
- Interactive map of Sirevåg
- Coordinates: 58.50386°N 5.80196°E
- Country: Norway
- Region: Western Norway
- County: Rogaland
- District: Jæren
- Municipality: Hå Municipality

Area
  - Total: 0.69 km^{2} (0.27 sq mi)
- Elevation: 13 m (43 ft)

Population (2025)
  - Total: 782
  - Density: 1,133/km^{2} (2,930/sq mi)
- Time zone: UTC+01:00 (CET)
  - Summer (DST): UTC+02:00 (CEST)
- Post Code: 4364 Sirevåg

Sirevåg is a village in Hå Municipality in Rogaland county, Norway. The village is located in the southeastern part of the municipality, about 5 kilometres (3.1 mi) northwest of the village of Hellvik in neighboring Eigersund Municipality. The village of Ogna sits immediately north of Sirevåg. The Sørlandet Line (traditionally called the Jæren Line) runs through Sirevåg, with the Jæren Commuter Rail stopping at Sirevåg Station.

The main source of income in Sirevåg is shrimp harvesting and processing, fishing, and agriculture. The main agricultural activities in this area is raising dairy cows, beef cows, pigs, sheep, and fur farming. Growing potatoes is also common.

Sirevåg has a very large mole/breakwater protecting its harbour.

The 0.69-square-kilometre (170-acre) village has a population (2025) of 782 and a population density of 1,133 inhabitants per square kilometre (2,930/sq mi).
