= Ogna Church =

Church in Rogaland, Norway

- Ogna kirke
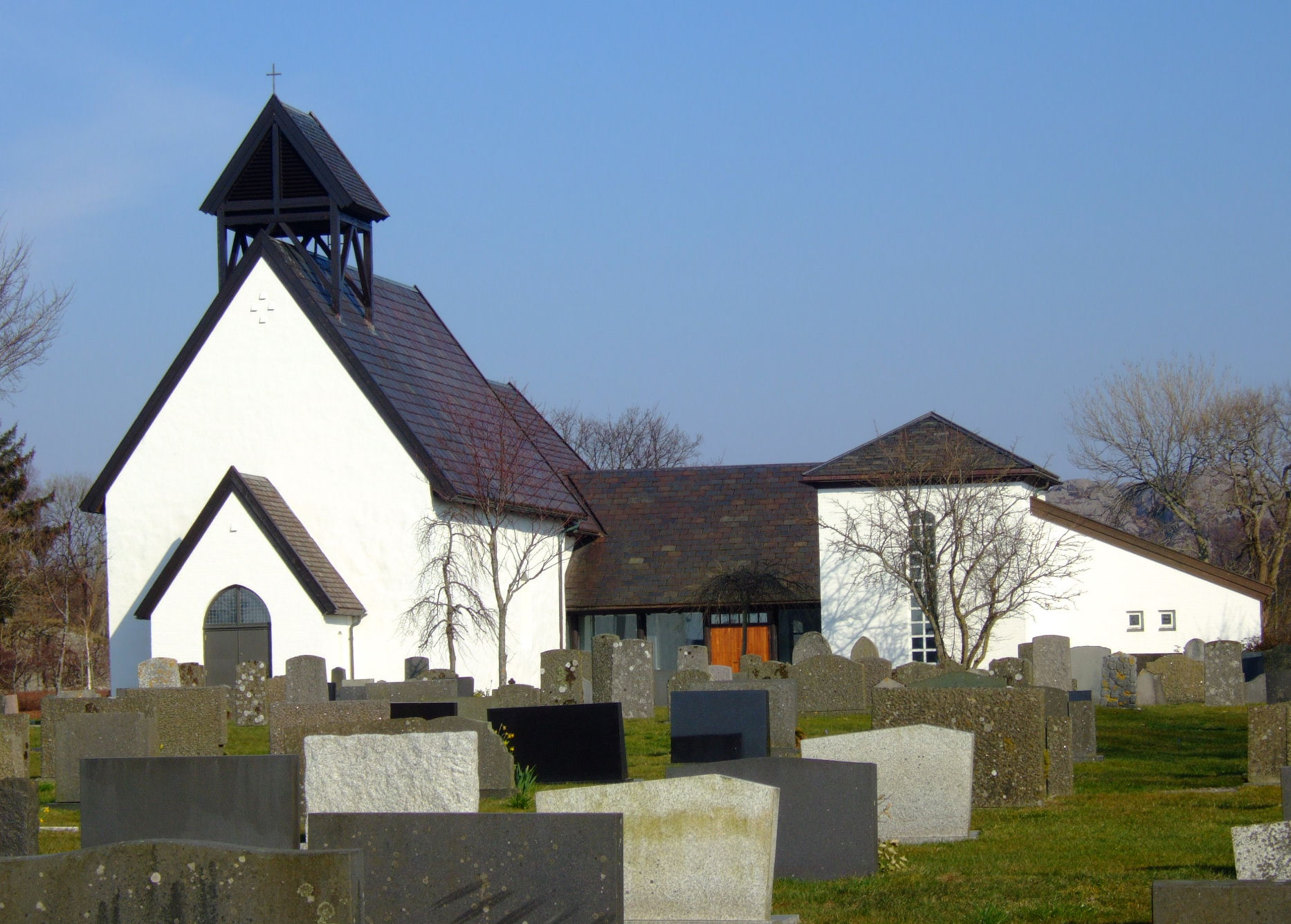
- View of the church
- Ogna Church
- 58.516514°N 05.80832°E
- Location: Hå Municipality, Rogaland
- Country: Norway
- Denomination: Church of Norway
- Previous denomination: Catholic Church
- Churchmanship: Evangelical Lutheran

History
- Status: Parish church
- Founded: 1250
- Events: Fire in 1991

Architecture
- Functional status: Active
- Architect: Torsvik og Thesen
- Architectural type: Long church
- Completed: 1995 (31 years ago)

Specifications
- Capacity: 300
- Materials: Stone

Administration
- Diocese: Stavanger bispedømme
- Deanery: Jæren prosti
- Parish: Ogna
- Norwegian Cultural Heritage Site
- Type: Church
- Status: Not protected
- ID: 85200

Ogna Church (Norwegian: Ogna kirke) is a parish church of the Church of Norway in Hå Municipality in Rogaland county, Norway. It is located in the village of Ogna. It is the church for the Ogna parish which is part of the Jæren prosti (deanery) in the Diocese of Stavanger. The white, stone church was built in a long church style in 1995 using designs by the architectural firm Torsvik og Thesen. The church seats about 300 people.

== History ==
The earliest existing historical records of the church date back to the year 1347, but the church was likely built in the middle of the 13th century around the year 1250. The medieval stone church had a rectangular floor plan that did not get narrower for the choir. It had one window on the south side and two windows on the north side.

In 1814, this church served as an election church (Norwegian: valgkirke). Together with more than 300 other parish churches across Norway, it was a polling station for elections to the 1814 Norwegian Constituent Assembly which wrote the Constitution of Norway. This was Norway's first national elections. Each church parish was a constituency that elected people called "electors" who later met together in each county to elect the representatives for the assembly that was to meet at Eidsvoll Manor later that year.

In 1840, the church was extended to the east with a new timber-framed choir, at the same time as the 17th century porch was replaced with a wooden tower. On 13 November 1991, the church caught fire and was totally ruined. The newly rebuilt church was consecrated on 5 June 1995.

== Media gallery ==
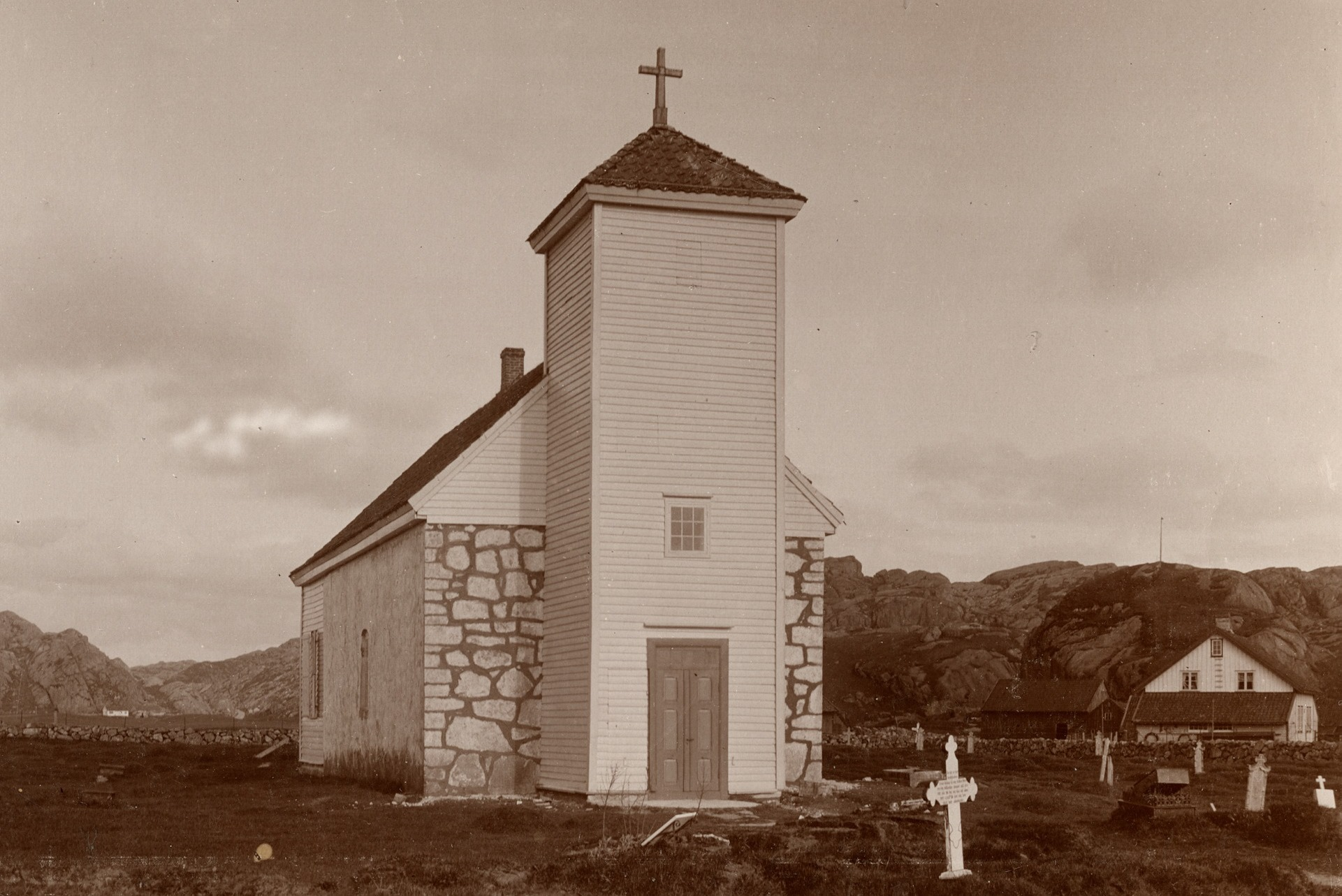
Old church (before 1991)

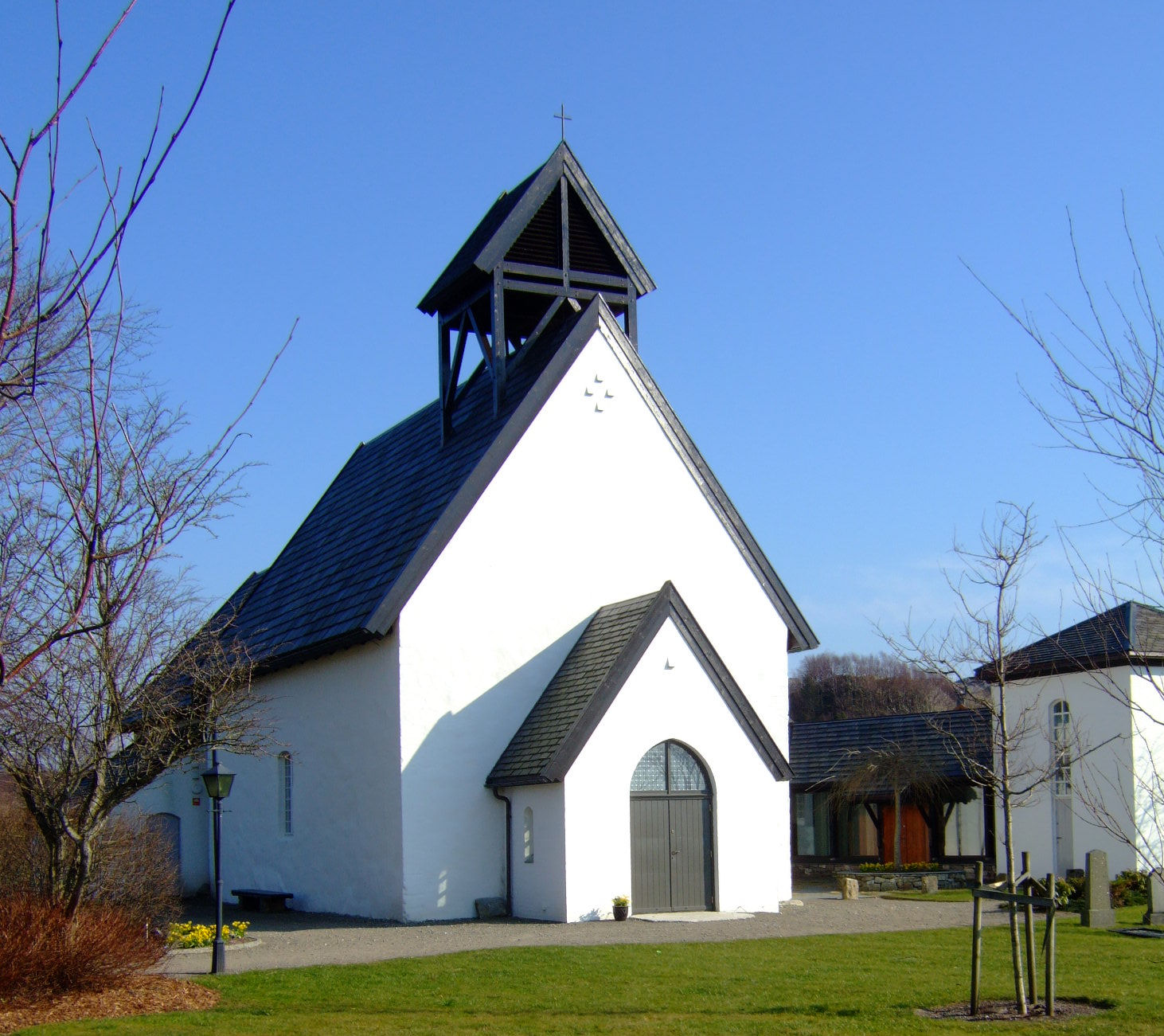
Present church

== See also ==
- List of churches in Rogaland
