= Jæren Line =

Railway line in Norway

Coordinates: 58°34′12″N 5°41′18″E

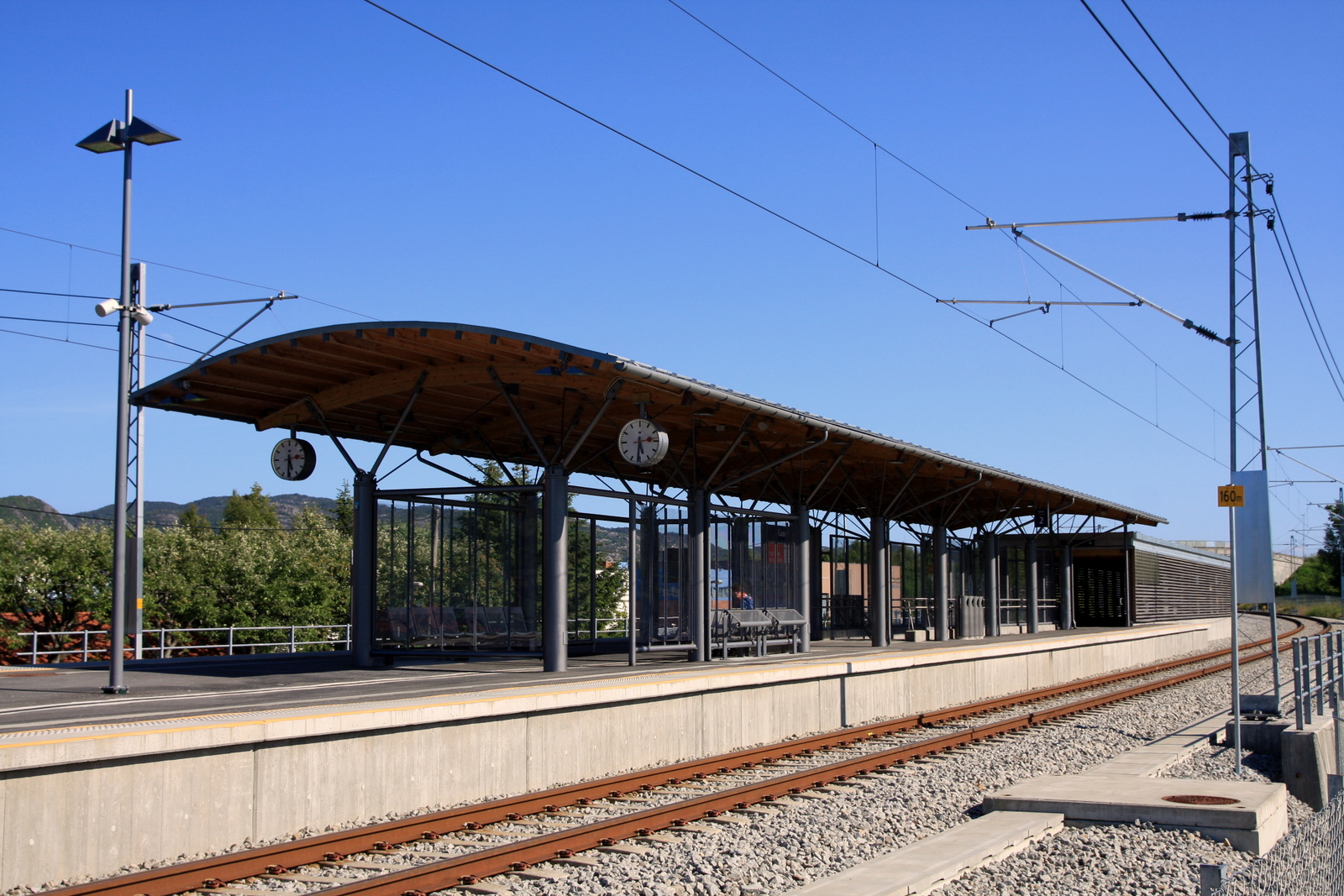
- Gausel Station

Overview
- Native name: Jærbanen
- Owner: Bane NOR
- Locale: Jæren, Norway
- Termini: Stavanger; Egersund
- Stations: 18

Service
- Type: Railway
- System: Norwegian railway network
- Operator(s): Go-Ahead Norge; CargoNet

History
- Opened: 27 February 1878

Technical
- Line length: 74.71 km (46.42 mi)
- Number of tracks: Double (Stavanger–Sandnes); Single (Sandnes–Egersund)
- Character: Intercity, commuter and freight
- Track gauge: 1,435 mm (4 ft 8 1/2 in)
- Electrification: 15 kV 16.7 Hz AC

The Jæren Line (Norwegian: Jærbanen) was a 74.7-kilometer (46.4 mi) long railway line between Stavanger and Egersund in Jæren, Norway. The name is no longer in official use and the section is regarded as the westernmost part of the Sørlandet Line. Owned by Bane NOR, the line has double track from Stavanger Station to Sandnes Station, and single track from Sandnes to Egersund Station. The line is electrified at 15 kV 16.7 Hz AC and equipped with centralized traffic control and GSM-R. The line is served by the Jæren Commuter Rail and intercity trains along the Sørlandet Line, both operated by Go-Ahead Norge. CargoNet runs container freight trains on the line, which terminate at Ganddal Freight Terminal.

The line opened as a 1,067 mm (3 ft 6 in) narrow gauge stand-alone line on 27 February 1878. The railway was extended from Egersund to Flekkefjord as the Flekkefjord Line in 1904. The Jæren Line's only branch, the Ålgård Line from Ganddal to Ålgård, opened in 1924. In 1944, the Sørlandet Line was extended to Sira on the Flekkefjord Line, and the Jæren Line was integrated in the main railway network. Because of this, the line was converted to standard gauge.

== Route ==
Map of the Jæren Line and the Ålgård Line

The Jæren Line constitutes the section of the Sørlandet Line between Stavanger and Egersund. At the time of the line's opening, it was 76.3 kilometers (47.4 mi) long, but has since the 1950s been 73.1 kilometers (45.4 mi) long. The railway is double track on the 14.5-kilometer (9.0 mi) section from Stavanger Station to Sandnes Station, and single track from there to Egersund Station. The line is electrified at 15 kV 16.7 Hz AC and equipped with centralized traffic control, automatic train stop, and GSM-R. The railway line is owned and maintained by the Norwegian National Rail Administration, a government agency.

The zero marker for the line is located at Stavanger Station, which is 598.70 kilometers (372.01 mi) from Oslo Central Station and located 5.3 meters (17 ft) above mean sea level (AMSL). Previously there was a branch just south of the station which ran through a 334-meter (1,096 ft) long tunnel before reaching the port. Southwards from Stavanger, the route largely runs along the waterfront, hugging Gandsfjorden. The first station after Stavanger is Paradis Station (1.4 km (0.87 mi) from Stavanger Station). The line runs past the closed Hillevåg Station and a closed spur to an industrial area at Mariero before reaching Mariero Station (4.13 km or 2.57 mi). The line continues past the closed Lyngnes Station, a closed spur to Sørbø Trelast and the closed Vaulen Station. After passing the closed Hinna Station and the closed Jåttå Station, which was exclusively used to serve matches and concerts at Viking Stadion, the line immediately afterwards reaches Jåttåvågen Station (7.2 km or 4.5 mi), which also serves the stadium and the newly redeveloped area of Jåtten.

The line continues past Gausel Station (9 km or 5.6 mi), which in addition to serving a redeveloped area serves as a major transfer hub for buses towards Forus and Sola. Next the line passes the closed Forus Station before running through the 117-meter (384 ft) long Lurahammer Tunnel and passing the closed Luravika Station and Lura Station. Through the town center of Sandnes, the line runs as an elevated railway, which previously also included a branch to the port in Sandnes. Sandnes Sentrum Station (14.82 m or 48.6 ft) is the main station serving the town. The line continues past Sandnes Station (15.36 m or 50.4 ft), which is the end of the double track.

After passing the closed Brualand Station and the open Ganddal Station (18.49 m or 60.7 ft), the closed Ålgård Line branches off. Ganddal Freight Terminal is the only freight terminal in Jæren. It has an annual capacity for 80,000 containers and can handle 600-meter (2,000 ft) long trains. The next station on the mainline are the closed Skjæveland Station and Orstad Station, followed by the operating Øksnevadporten Station (22.42 m or 73.6 ft). South of there lays to spurs, to Øksnevad, Kvarnaland and Block Watne. The line continues past the closed Engjelsvåg Station before reaching Klepp Station (24.84 m or 81.5 ft). The line continues past the closed Leland Station and the closed Tumarki Station before having a closed spur to Varheia. After passing the closed Vardheia Station, the line reaches Bryne Station (29.58 m or 97.0 ft).

Next the line passes a spur to Hetland and then passes four closed stations, Kjelsholen, Hognestad, Gjerdo and Tårland. After reaching Nærbø Station (37.68 m or 123.6 ft), the line continues past the closed Kvia Station and the closed Dysjaland Station before reaching Varhaug Station (43.11 m or 141.4 ft). Located at 44.3 meters (145 ft) AMSL, it is the highest-elevated station on the line. After passing the closed Odland Station, the line runs past the closed Stavnheim Station and reaches Vigrestad Station (49.22 m or 161.5 ft). The line continues past the closed Hogstad Station and the closed Stokkaland Station before reaching Brusand Station (54.17 m or 177.7 ft). Afterwards it crosses Vauleelva and then runs through the 199-meter (653 ft) long Varden Tunnel before passing the closed Varden Station and reaching Ogna Station (58.41 m or 191.6 ft).

At Ogna there is a distinct change to the landscape, as it changes from a flat to a hilly. Particularly between Bryne and Ogna, the line have a large curve radius, but between Ogna and Egersund this changes to much tighter curvature. After Ogna the line crosses Ognaelv and runs through the 222-meter (728 ft) long Sirevåg Tunnel before reaching Sirevåg Station (60.36 m or 198.0 ft). The line then runs through two tunnels before passing the closed Vatnamot Station and reaching Hellvik Station (66.79 m or 219.1 ft). The line continues through six tunnels, the longest being 596 meters (1,955 ft), before passing the closed Maurholen Station. It then passes through four more tunnels and two bridges before reaching Egersund Station (74.71 m or 245.1 ft). At Egersund, the line continues as the Sørlandet Line. Originally the Jæren Line ran to the old station in Egersund, which was kept until 1952 as a 1.29-kilometer (0.80 mi) branch from Egersund Station. This included bridges over Eieelva and Lundeelva.

== History ==
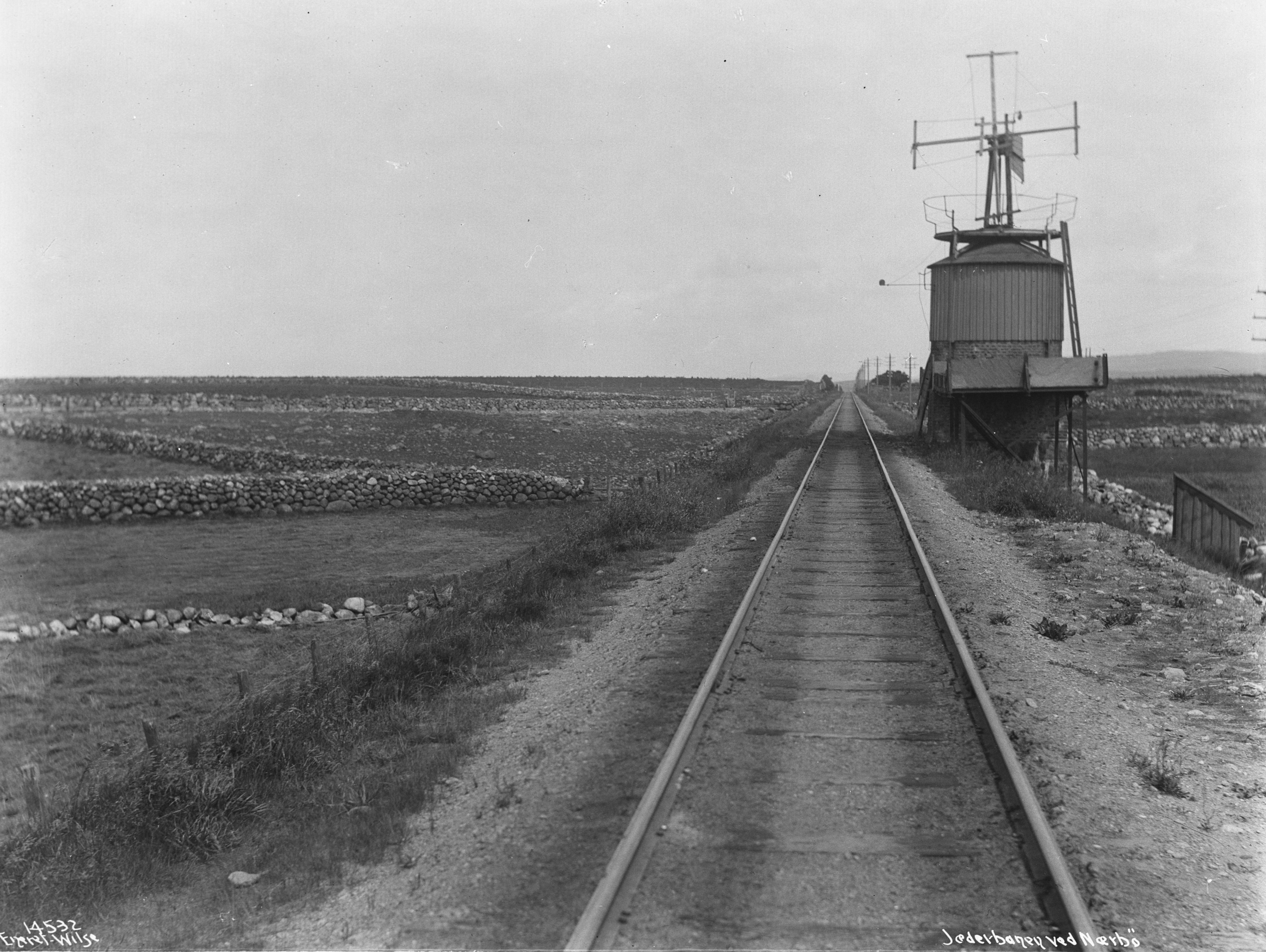
The narrow-gauged Jæren Line and a windmill at Hå in 1912

=== Construction ===
During the 19th century, transport along the Jæren coast was dominated by ship. Some simple roads had been built, but these were insufficient for quick and efficient transport. In the mid-19th century, the roads were improved, and ideas were launched to start a traction engine service along the coast. At an 1866 meeting at the sheriff's office in, Forest Manager Andreas Tanberg Gløersen launched the first idea of building a railway to connect Stavanger and Egersund. Gløersen had been to the Netherlands where he had taken and observed train operations. Later the same year, a meeting was held with representatives from Hå Municipality, Klepp Municipality, and Time Municipality.

The meeting concluded that a railway should be built, and the responsibility for the preparatory work was given to County Governor Vilhelm Ludvig Herman von Munthe af Morgenstierne. He started by conducting traffic counting throughout the district. This resulted in an estimate for a revenue of NOK 215,000 and a cost of NOK 153,000 per year. Originally the proposal was to connect the various villages in Jæren together. But during planning, national authorities stated that the line would be part of a trans-national railway that would connect Rogaland to Eastern Norway. This resulted in the railway being planned with a straighter profile and running via fewer communities.

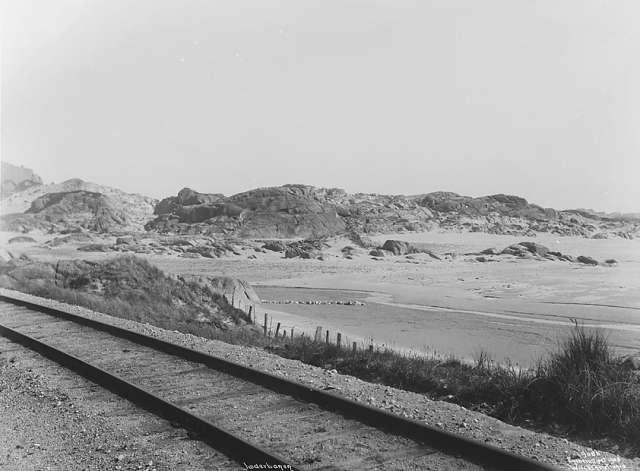
The narrow-gauged Jæren Line near Ogna in 1908

The proposal was sent to the Ministry of the Interior, who recommended the line and presented it to Parliament on 6 May 1874. Parliament passed legislation to build the line on 3 June 1874. During the celebrations in Stavanger that evening, a gunner lost his hand following the explosion of a cannon. Particularly in Sandnes the choice of route resulted in much debate. Parliament had in its proposal for the line stipulated that the railway should have good port access in Sandnes. The "Blue Line" proposal ran along the waterfront, but would require two different stations in Sandnes. The "Red Line" proposal ran midway through the town center, splitting it in two. However, it gave only a single station, and was eventually chosen, after the municipal council initially had supported the Blue Line.

Construction started in October 1874 on the section between Forus and Gausel. Tracks were shipped to Norestraen, which was the southernmost docks which were sufficiently deep to allow the ships. When the railway was passed, the country was experiencing good times, but through the 1870s, the country fell into harder times. This caused a reduction in spending on the line, which was particularly in investments in stations. A standardized, small station building was chosen and in Egersund an existing house was bought. The line opened on 27 February 1878, and was at the time of opening 76.3 kilometers (47.4 mi) long. When the line opened, it had no tunnels and only twelve stations. Already the following year, additional stations were opened in Sirevåg, Brusand, and Hognestad. Hillevåg opened in 1880 and Mariero opened in the 1880s.

=== Branches and gauge conversion ===
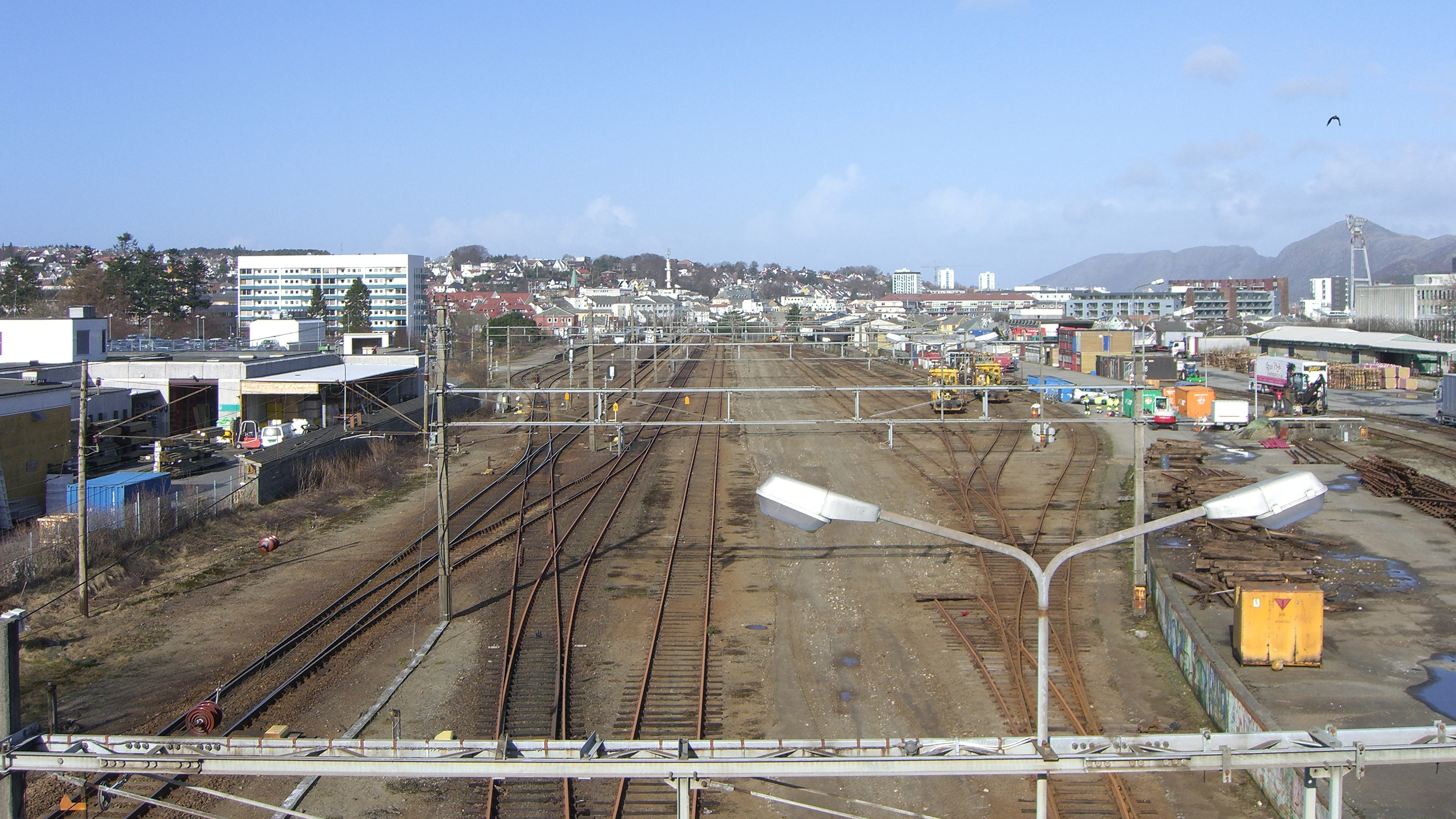
The yard at Brueland

On 5 February 1875, the parliamentary Standing Committee on Railways published a report recommending that there be built four trans-national railways to connect western and central Norway to eastern Norway. The Sørlandet Line was part of this plan, and was scheduled to be built between 1876 and 1888. The line was proposed to be built via the Vestfold Line to Skien and onwards along the south coast before connecting with the Jæren Line at Egersund. However, Norway was hit by the Depression of 1882–85, which reduced railway construction to a minimum. In addition, controversy arose over which route should be chosen through Agder: along the populated coast or through the sparsely populated interior. This issue kept the line at bay, and not until 1908 was a decision made in favor of the interior route.

In 1894, the Railway Committee recommended parliament to prioritize three new lines, the Bergen Line, the Rauma Line and the Gjøvik Line. However, this met protests from representatives from Agder, and it became clear that there would not be a majority to build the Bergen Line unless part of the Sørlandet Line was built. Jørgen Løvland proposed a compromise in which the Flekkefjord Line be built from Egersund to Flekkefjord, as the first part of the Sørlandet Line, as well as the Treungen Line. The Flekkefjord Line opened on 31 October 1904. The same year, stations were opened at Forus and Gausel.

The Ålgård Line was originally launched as an alternative route for the Sørlandet Line. In 1910, a committee was appointed to conduct preliminary planning. Although NSB's board supported the line, construction was placed on hold. In 1919, local politicians proposed that the line be built administratively as part of the Jæren Line, but this was rejected by the government. Instead, the ministry wanted to again consider the Ålgård Line as part of the Sørlandet Line, and proposed that the Ålgård Line be built with standard gauge—which would be used for the Sørlandet Line—instead of the narrow gauge used by the Jæren Line. However, there would be no need for standard gauge until the Sørlandet Line was extended to Rogaland, so the line was planned to be built with narrow gauge track, but all other installations would be prepared for standard gauge. The first train to operate on the line went from Stavanger on 20 December 1924, and the Ålgård Line became the last state-owned railway in Norway to be opened with narrow gauge. Not until 1930 was a branch built from the railway station in Sandnes to the port.

The Sørlandet Line was being built in standard gauge, and when the line was to connect to the Flekkefjord Line at Moi Station, the Jæren Line would have to be rebuilt to standard gauge to avoid a break-of-gauge. Preliminary work to ease the conversion was done during the 1920s. The conversion itself took only two days, during which the line was closed. On 29 April 1944, a test train was run from Sira to Stavanger. The upgrade was officially opened on 1 May, after which the Jæren Line was connected to Oslo, and considered part of the Sørlandet Line. When the Jæren Line was built, the station in Egersund was located in the city center. With the opening of the Sørlandet Line, a new station was built 1-kilometer (0.62 mi) north of the city center. The old station remained in use, despite being located on a dead-end track, as it was served by trains terminating in Egersund. However, this section of line was not converted to standard gauge until 1948. Passenger traffic was terminated from 25 September 1952, although the spur remained in use as a port line until 1986.

With the change of gauge, NSB took the opportunity to change the route several places. After these changes, including the move of the station in Egersund, the Jæren Line was reduced to a length of 73.1 kilometers (45.4 mi). The changes included building twelve new tunnels on the section between Brusand and Egersund, of which nine were between Hellvik and Egersund. Another tunnel was built at Lurahammer in Sandnes. The tunnels opened between 1947 and 1950.

Sandnes became the third-largest intermediate stop on the Sørlandet Line, after Drammen Station and Kristiansand Station. To better the facilities for serving Sandnes, the track through the city center was rebuilt to an elevated railway. Given the unofficial name The High Line (Norwegian: Høybanen), the new Sandnes Station was located further south of the center of Sandnes, at Skeiene. The new station and the elevated section opened on 1 October 1955. Also a number of other stations were rebuilt, in part because they had become too small and in part because they needed to be moved because of line realignments during the gauge conversion. New station buildings were opened at Vigrestad in 1954, at Nærbø in 1955, at Sirevåg in 1956, at Bryne in 1958 and at Klepp and Varhaug in 1959. The 1950s also saw the establishment of a new depot at Kvaleberget. New stations were established at Varden and Vardheia in 1956, Lyngnes in 1957 and Luravika in 1959. Tumarki Station was closed in 1957.

In 1955, passenger traffic on the Ålgård Line was terminated, although sporadic freight traffic remained until 1988. On 3 June 1956, the Jæren Line received electric traction. With electrification, NSB introduced three weekly services with the Class 66 multiple units, which were capable of 120 kilometers per hour (75 mph), but the service did not generate sufficient patronage and was terminated in 1958. The remaining long-haul trains were hauled using El 11 locomotives. They were from the 1960s supplemented with El 13 locomotives. The electrification also saw the introduction of electric multiple units for local trains. Originally this consisted of Class 65 and five Class 67. In 1960, the Class 67 units were swapped with Class 68 units.

After the Ofoten Line, the Jæren Line was the first line in Norway to receive centralized traffic control, which was taken into use on 20 March 1964. The section from Sandnes to Egersund followed suit on 7 July. In 1966, 18 stations were closed, consisting of Maurholen, Vatnanot, Stokkaland, Hogstad, Stavnheim, Odland, Dysjaland, Kvia, Tårland, Gjerdo, Vardheia, Laland, Engjelsvåg, Orstad, Skjæveland, Lura, Luravika and Vaulen. During the 1970s, El 14 locomotives were gradually introduced on both freight and passenger trains.

Automatic train stop was introduced on 30 December 1986. During the late 1980s, El 17 locomotives were introduced, but they proved unreliable and were taken out of service after 1998, with the introduction of El 18. In 1991, four Class 69 units were introduced on trains between Egersund and Stavanger, and in 1994, two renovated Class 69 units were moved from Eastern Norway and put into service between Kristiansand and Stavanger. The Scanet train radio system was installed between 1993 and 1996.

=== Commuter rail and double track ===
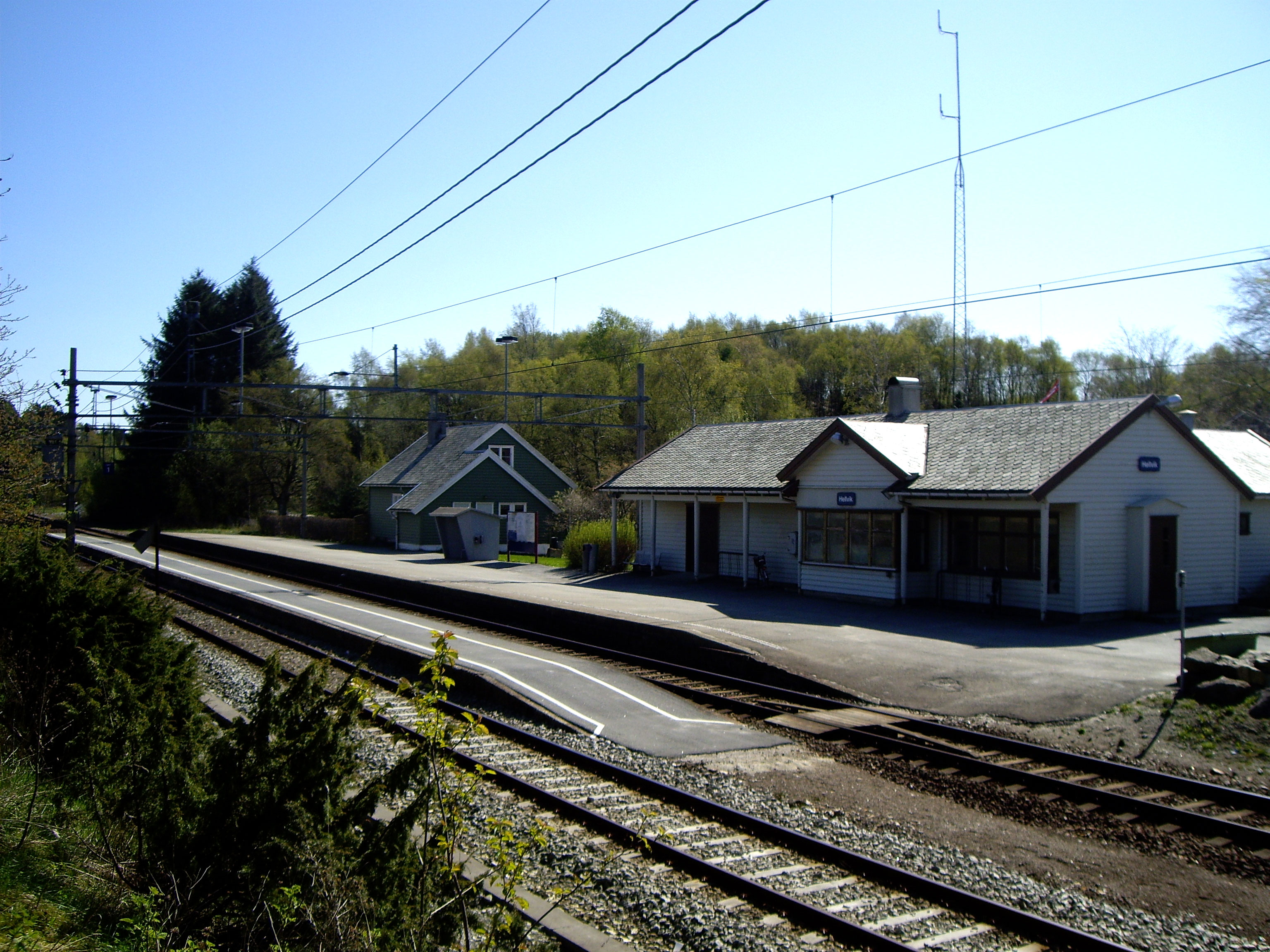
Hellvik Station

The commuter rail system was introduced from 1 January 1992, after an agreement between NSB, Rogaland County Municipality and the six municipalities along the line. NSB introduced new Class 69 multiple units, while the county municipality introduced a fare coordination with the corresponding bus services. The increase in service involved 15 departures per direction per day, and the travel time from Stavanger to Egersund was reduced from 80 to 55 minutes. In addition, NSB introduced a half-hour headway between Stavanger and Sandnes. The stations were upgraded, including new sheds. A new station, Sandnes Sentrum, was opened in the city center of Sandnes. At the same time, the stations with the least patronage, Hognestad and Lyngnes, were closed. NSB stated that the goal was to increase the daily ridership from 2,900 to 5,000 passengers by 1994.

The commuter service was a success, with NSB experiencing a 112 percent increase in ridership the first year. In 1993, NSB won Statens Byggeskikkpris, among other things for the new sheds on the Jæren Line. By 1995, ridership was up 150 percent from before the commuter rail started. In 1997, NSB announced that they would order 36 new electric multiple units, which would among other things replace the aging trains on the Jæren Line. The new Class 72 trains were put into service on 8 August 2002, several years after schedule. In April 2004, the rail administration opened Jåttå Station, which was located close to Viking Stadion, the new home ground of the Norwegian Premier League side Viking FK. The train transported generated a market share of one sixth of the spectators. On 2 January 2007, the Scanet train radio system was replaced with GSM-R.

To further increase capacity and regularity, the Norwegian National Rail Administration decided to rebuild the section from Stavanger to Sandnes to double track. The upgrade involved closing Hillevåg Station, and building three new stations: Paradis, Jåttåvågen and Gausel. Construction was estimated to cost 2.2 billion Norwegian krone. The primary goal of the project was to increase capacity and build stations in areas with transit-oriented development. Travel time between Stavanger and Sandnes was only reduced with four minutes. Construction was done by adding another tack adjacent to the existing one, rather than building a new right-of-way. The upgrades included the construction of 6.3 kilometers (3.9 mi) of low noise barriers and 3.5-kilometer (2.2 mi) of conventional high noise barriers. The upgrades were made in such a way that a future tram-train can run on the route. All intermediate stations were built in such a way that they later could be adapted to also serve the light rail service. The route is built to allow the light rail service to enter and leave the Jæren Line at Lura, Gausel, Hinna and Stavager.

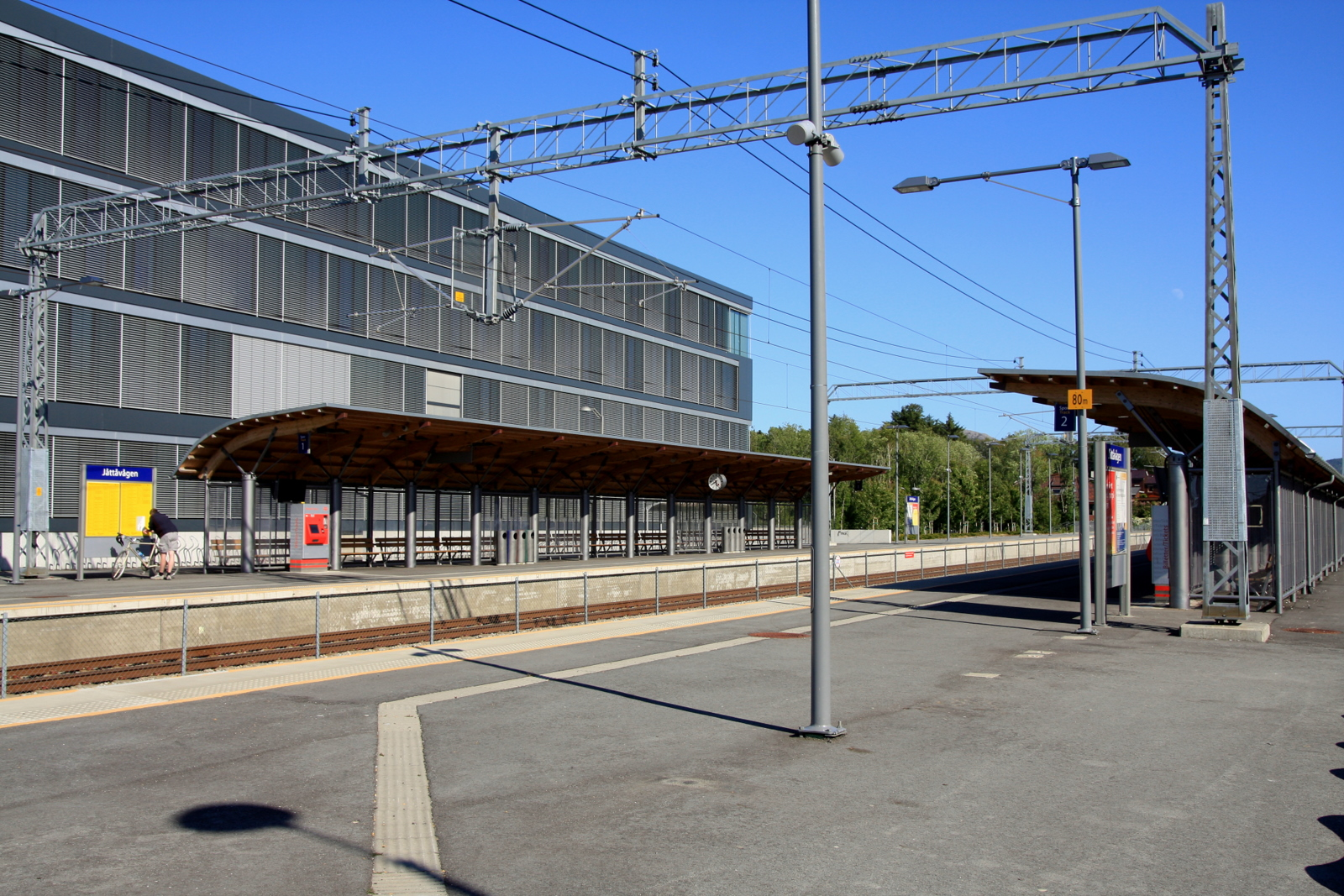
Jåttåvågen Station opened in 2008

Construction of the 14.5-kilometer (9.0 mi) long section was split into four contracts: Stavanger–Hinna, Jåttåvågen, Jåttåvågen–Lurahammaren and Lurahammaren–Sandnes. The section past Jåttåvågen was the first to commence, in October 2006. The original plans called for this section to be built last, but Stavanger Municipality wanted to prioritize transit-oriented development in conjunction with new major building projects, and therefore the municipality advanced NOK 90 million for the station. In addition to Jåttåvågen Station, a number of bridges were built. The area is a growth area for Stavanger, with the station being located next to Viking Stadion, Jåttå Upper Secondary School and several large workplaces. Jåttåvågen Station opened on 6 January 2008.

Construction of the section from Jåttåvågen to Lurahammaren started in March 2007, while the section from Lurahammaren to Sandnes started in September 2007. The latter is the narrowest part of the line and required the construction of several new bridges. Lurahammaren Tunnel was widened to allow double track, a new bridge was built over the intersection og Langgaten–Strandgaten, a new bridge was built over County Road 44 at Lura, the technical facilities at Sandnes Station were upgraded, and the tracks to the port in Sandnes were removed. Construction on the section between Stavanger and Hinna started in April 2008. As there was already a double track between Kvaleberg and Stavanger Station, only the southern part of the route received new track. However, the existing part was subject to technical upgrades and a new station was built at Paradis to serve the southern part the downtown area. From April to November 2009, the section from Ganddal to Stavanger was closed while the last part of the upgrade was completed. The new line was opened on 16 November 2009 and from 14 December, the 15-minute headway was introduced between Stavanger and Sandnes.

Construction of a new freight terminal at Ganddal started in 2005. The terminal cost NOK 500 million and replaced the terminal at Stavanger Station. Construction 0was completed in 2007 and the terminal opened on 21 January 2008 Both the terminal and the double track were to use the newly developed signaling system Merkur, but the Norwegian Railway Inspectorate would not give permission for the system to be installed. Because of this, the signaling system at the terminal is operated manually and therefore cannot be used with full capacity.

== Service ==
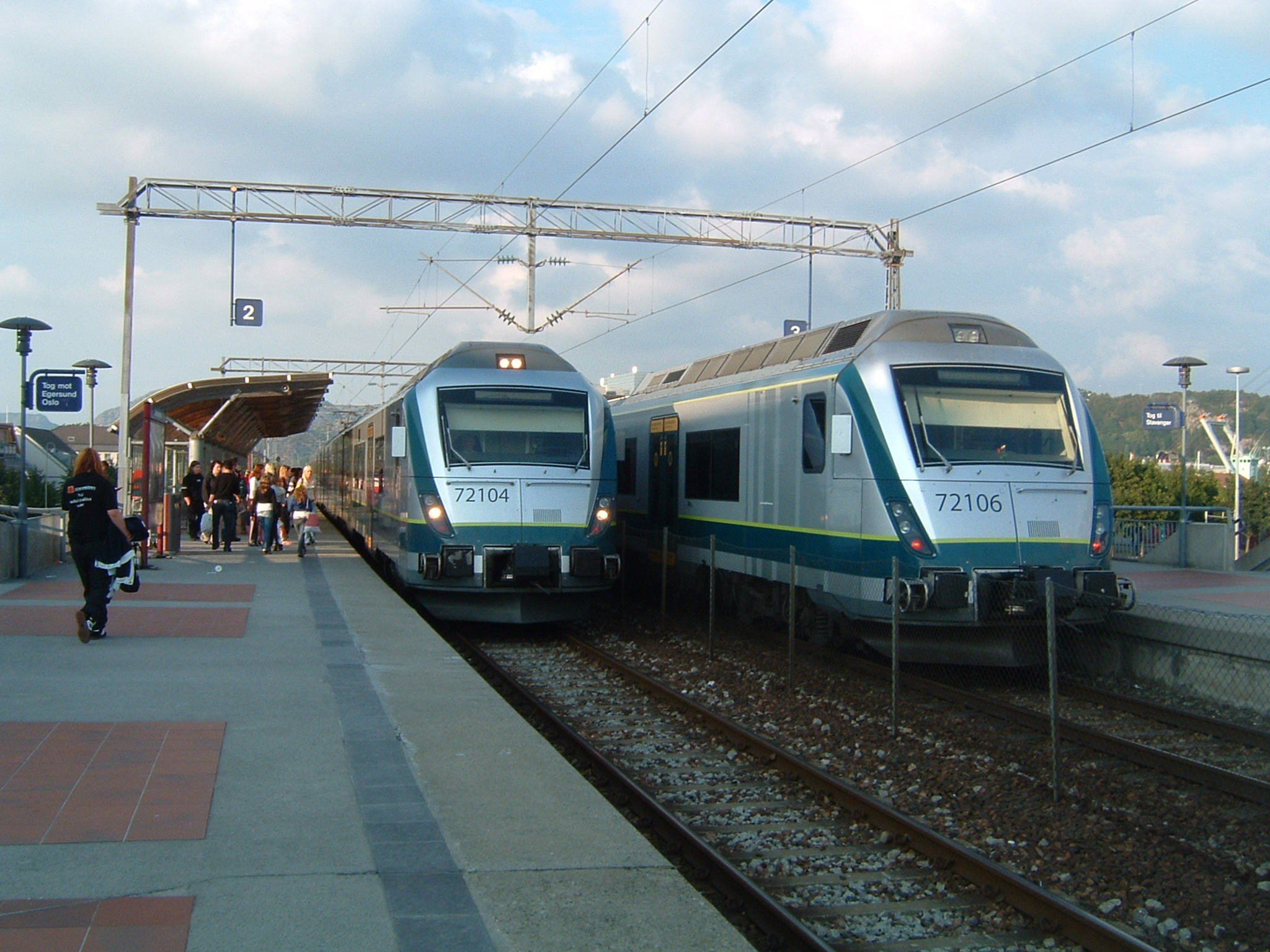
Two Class 72 trains of the Jæren Commuter Rail at Sandnes Sentrum Station

The Jæren Commuter Rail is a local services operated by Go-Ahead Norge between Stavanger and Egersund. The service between Stavanger and Sandnes operate with a fixed schedule every 15 minutes. Of the trains to Sandnes, half continue onwards to Nærbø, giving a 30-minute headway. One train per hour operate all the way to Egersund. On weekends and late evenings, there is a reduced service. Travel time from Stavanger to Sandnes is 19 minutes, from Stavanger to Nærbø is 37 minutes, and from Stavanger to Egersund is 1-hour and 7 minutes. The operating deficits are covered through subsidies by the Norwegian Ministry of Transport and Communications. Go-Ahead uses four-car NSB Class 72 electric multiple units on the service. As of 2011, the service has a weekly ridership of 74,000.

Go-Ahead also operates up to eight daily intercity services to Kristiansand. Up to five of these services continue onwards to Oslo. Travel time from Stavanger to Kristiansand is 3 hours, while travel time all the way to Oslo is seven and a half hours. One of the services to Oslo is a night train. Intercity trains along the Jæren Line only call at Egersund, Bryne, Sandnes Sentrum and Stavanger, with travel time from Stavanger to Egersund being slightly less than an hour. CargoNet operates up to five container freight trains from Oslo per day and one from Drammen per day to Ganddal Freight Terminal.

== Future ==
Plans have been made which call for either doubling or tripling the frequency on all the services on the existing commuter rail network. However, increased frequency south of Sandnes will require double track. Should the frequency be doubled, double track would have to be built to where the current service to Nærbø terminates. Plans call for these trains to possibly be extended to either Varhaug or Vigrestad. Should the frequency be tripled, double track would be needed all the way to Egersund. Parts of the Jæren Line is straight enough to permit speeds between 200 and 250 kilometers per hour (120 and 160 mph). However, several shorter parts need to be rebuilt to allow this, particularly between Egersund and Ogna, and from Bryne to Ganddal. In particular, the section from Ogna to Egersund would probably have to follow an all-new route, should it be rebuilt to double track. The effect of higher maximum speeds is greatest for intercity trains, as the commuter trains have so frequent stops they spend little time at maximum speed.

Egersund Station has been proposed moved back to its old location for the commuter rail, giving Egersund two stations: one for commuter trains and one for regional trains. The right-of-way still exists for this route, making construction easy. A new Sørlandet Line has also been proposed, which would run south instead of north from Egersund. This would mean that a city center location for Egersund Station would be better for intercity trains as well.

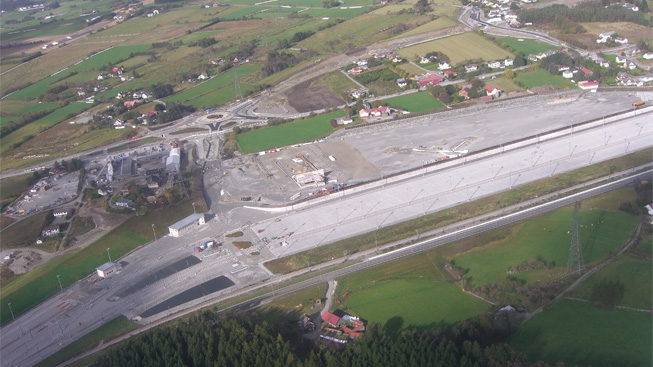
Ganddal Freight Terminal during construction

Reopening the Ålgård Line as part of the commuter rail service has also been proposed. The first 3 kilometers (1.9 mi) of the line remains in use, allowing freight trains access to a cement factory. The line has officially been closed, but has not been abandoned. The National Rail Administration retains ownership and can in the future renovate the line for operation. The annual traffic potential for the Ålgård Line is 600,000 passengers. Plans call for stations at Vagle, Figgjo, Kongeparken and Ålgård. It is possible to continue the trains that currently terminate at Sandnes to Ålgård without new infrastructure investments to the Sørlandet Line. However, the Ålgård Line would need a full upgrade, including new tracks, electric system and signaling. Ålgård is also a good location for a park and ride for European Road E39.

A branch to Sola has been considered to allow the trains to operate to Sola and Stavanger Airport, Sola. The line would branch from the Sørlandet Line south of Gausel, and be built so trains from the branch could run both northwards and southwards. Proposed stations include the airport, Solakrossen, Forus West, Statoil's head office and possibly the shopping center Kvadrat. This would give a travel time of 17 minutes from the airport to the city center, and 10 minutes from the airport to Sandnes. This route has, however, also been proposed as part of the light rail system. It is estimated to generate 2.5 million passengers annually.

Rogaland County Municipality is planning a light rail for Greater Stavanger. The initial plans call for a Y-shaped service which could be operational by 2018, with possibilities for further expansion. As of 2010, the plans call for a 16.2-kilometer (10.1 mi) line from Stavanger to Sandnes, and a 7.7-or-8.8-kilometer (4.8 or 5.5 mi) branch to the airport. The travel time from Sandnes to Stavanger would be 29 minutes, and is therefore a supplement to the commuter rail. The light rail would have interchange with the Jæren Line at Stavanger, Paradis, Jåttåvågen, Gausel and Sandnes Sentrum. Several new branches of the light rail have been proposed for later construction.

On 15 December 2019 operation of the line will pass from Vy to Go-Ahead Norge.

== See also ==
- Narrow gauge railways in Norway
