= Jåttåvågen Station =

Railway station in Stavanger, Norway

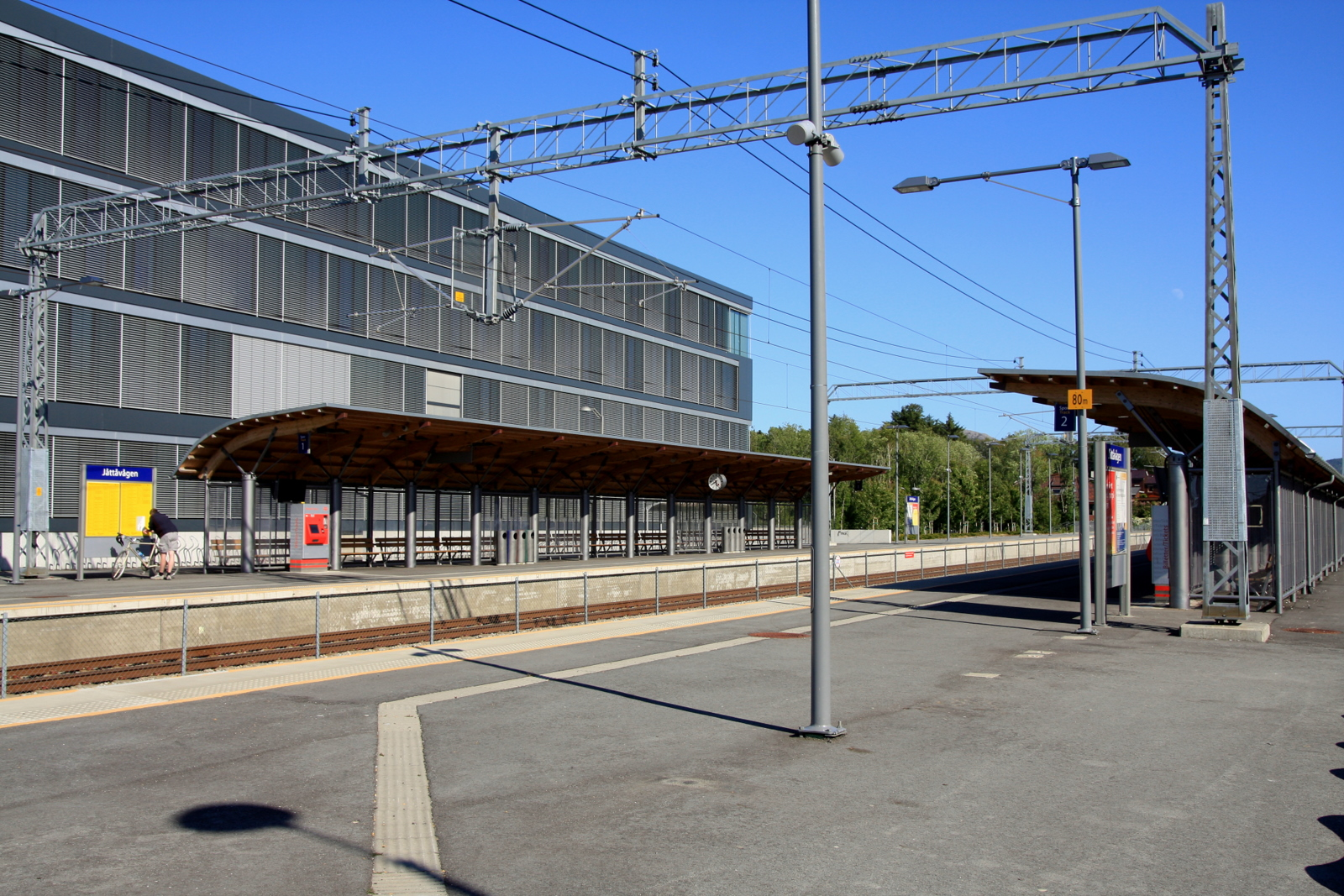

General information
- Location: Jåtten, Stavanger; Norway
- Coordinates: 58.91430°N 5.72864°E
- Owner: Bane NOR
- Operator: Go-Ahead Norge
- Line: Sørlandet Line
- Distance: 591.5 km (367.5 mi)
- Platforms: 2
- Connections: Bus: Kolumbus Line 11

History
- Opened: 6 January 2008
Location

Jåttåvågen Station (Norwegian: Jåttåvågen holdeplass) is a railway station located in the municipality of Stavanger in Rogaland county, Norway. The station is located at Jåtten in the city of Stavanger, about 7.2 kilometres (4.5 mi) from the main Stavanger Station. It is served by the Jæren Commuter Rail operated by Go-Ahead Norge by up to four hourly trains in each direction. The station is located along the double track section of the Sørland Line, and was opened on 8 January 2009, replacing Jåttå Station. The station is within a minute's walk of Viking Stadion and Jåttå Upper Secondary School. The station is co-located with a Kolumbus bus stop, allowing transfers to and from Line 11.

== Facilities ==
The station is 591.5 kilometres (367.5 mi) from Oslo Central Station and 7.2 kilometres (4.5 mi) from Stavanger Station. Jåttåvågen Station is universally accessible, unstaffed and equipped with ticket machines. The station has a kiss and ride stop. Viking Stadion, the home ground of Eliteserien side Viking FK, is located one minute's walk from the station. The same is the case for Jåttå Upper Secondary School. The area around the station is being redeveloped in a project called Hinna Park. Aker Solutions is in the process of building a new office building near the station to locate all its Greater Stavanger employees.

== Service ==
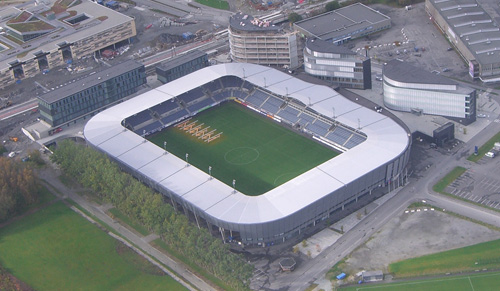
Jåttåvågen Station is located a minute's walk from Viking Stadion

The station is served by the Jæren Commuter Rail, operated by Go-Ahead. During regular operating hours on weekday, Go-Ahead operates four trains in each direction each hour. All northbound trains run to Stavanger Station, where they terminate. All four southbound trains operate to at least Sandnes Station, and two more continue to Nærbø Station and one runs to Egersund Station. Travel time to Stavanger is 8 minutes, to Sandnes Sentrum is 8 minutes, to Nærbø is 39 minutes and to Egersund is 57 minutes. NSB operates the line using Class 72 electric multiple units. Transfer to city bus is available 100 metres (330 ft) away, which serves Kolumbus' Line 11.

== History ==
The line past Jåttåvågen was built as part of the Jæren Line and opened in 1878. In 2004, after Viking Stadion was completed, Jåttå Station was built. However, it was only served by commuter trains in conjunction with football matches and concerts at the stadium. In 2006 the Norwegian National Rail Administration started rebuilding the track between Stavanger and Sandnes to double track. As part of that, Jåttå was closed and replaced by Jåttåvågen. Construction of the station took a year. In June 2007, the old track past the station was demolished and until November work was done on the western part of the station and the western part of the bridge. From 26 to 28 May 2008, the line past the station was closed while a new bridge was placed over Jåttåvågveien. Originally, the Jåttåvågen Station was intended to be taken into use when the double track from Stavanger to Sandnes opened in late 2009. However, in 2007 the city, Rogaland County Municipality and the National Rail Administration agreed to split the cost of finishing the station in advance, allowing it to open on 6 January 2008. From April to November 2009, the section from Ganddal to Stavanger was closed while the last part of the upgrade was completed. The double track was opened on 16 November 2009 and from 14 December, the 15-minute headway was introduced between Stavanger and Sandnes.

Preceding station	Local trains	Following station
Mariero towards Stavanger	L5 Jæren Commuter Rail	Gausel towards Egersund
