= Jåttå Station =

Railway station in Stavanger, Norway

Jåttå

General information
- Location: Jåttå, Stavanger; Norway
- Coordinates: 58°54′46″N 5°43′51″E
- Owner: Norwegian National Rail Administration
- Line: Sørlandet Line
- Distance: 592 km (368 mi)

History
- Opened: 2004
- Closed: 2008
Location

Jåttå Station (Norwegian: Jåttå holdeplass) was a railway station located at Jåttå in Stavanger municipality in Rogaland county, Norway. The station was served by the Jæren Commuter Rail between Stavanger and Egersund. The station was located 6.5 kilometres (4.0 mi) south of the centre of the city of Stavanger and was used as an extra stop for trains when there were football games at Viking Stadion.

== History ==
The station was opened along with the football stadium in 2004. It closed on 6 January 2008 when it was replaced by the nearby Jåttåvågen Station, the first part of the new double track between Stavanger and Sandnes to open.

Preceding station		Following station
Mariero	Sørlandet Line	Sandnes
