= Mariero Station =

Railway station in Stavanger, Norway

General information
- Location: Mariero, Stavanger; Norway
- Coordinates: 58.93455°N 5.75331°E
- Owner: Bane NOR
- Operator: Go-Ahead Norge
- Line: Sørlandet Line
- Distance: 594.70 km (369.53 mi)
- Platforms: 2
- Connections: Bus: Kolumbus

History
- Opened: 1901
Location

Mariero Station (Norwegian: Mariero holdeplass) is a railway station in Stavanger Municipality in Rogaland county, Norway. The station is located at Mariero in the city of Stavanger, about 4.13 kilometres (2.57 mi) from the main Stavanger Station. It is served by the Jæren Commuter Rail operated by Go-Ahead Norge by up to four hourly trains in each direction. The station is located along the double track section of the Sørland Line, and was opened on 16 November 2009. It is co-located with a Kolumbus bus stop, allowing transfer to many routes.

== Facilities ==
The station is 594.57 kilometres (369.45 mi) from Oslo Central Station and 4.13 kilometres (2.57 mi) from Stavanger Station. Paradis Station is universally accessible, unstaffed and equipped with ticket machines. It has 20 free parking places. The station is located right on the waterfront, and located in a mixed residential and commercial area. It is the station between Sandnes and Stavanger with the least usage. The station is located one minutes walk from Lyse Energi's head office, and ten minutes walk from Hetland Upper Secondary School.

== Service ==
The station is served by the Jæren Commuter Rail, operated by Go-Ahead. During regular operating hours on weekday, Go-Ahead operates four trains in each direction each hour. All northbound trains run to Stavanger Station, where they terminate. All four southbound trains operate to at least Sandnes Station, and two more continue to Nærbø Station and one runs to Egersund Station. Travel time to Stavanger is 5 minutes, to Sandnes Sentrum is 11 minutes, to Nærbø is 42 minutes and to Egersund is 1 hour and 2 minutes. NSB operates the line using Class 72 electric multiple units. Transfer to city bus is available 800 metres (2,600 ft) away on National Road 44, which serves Kolumbus buses.

== History ==
The line past Paradis was built as part of the Jæren Line and opened in 1878. The old station at Mariero opened in 1901 and was classified as a halt. It was upgraded to a station, and thus staffed and became a passing loop from 15 September 1922. From 15 January 1945, the passing loop was deactivated, but again activated in 1950. From 2 June 1957, the Jæren Line received centralized traffic control and the station was no longer staffed. In 2006 the Norwegian National Rail Administration started rebuilding the track between Stavanger and Sandnes to double track, which involved moving the station slightly to the south. The new line and station were opened on 16 November 2009 and from 14 December, the 15-minute headway was introduced between Stavanger and Sandnes.

Preceding station	Local trains	Following station
Paradis towards Stavanger	L5 Jæren Commuter Rail	Jåttåvågen towards Egersund
