= Hellvik Station =

Railway station in Eigersund, Norway

Hellvik
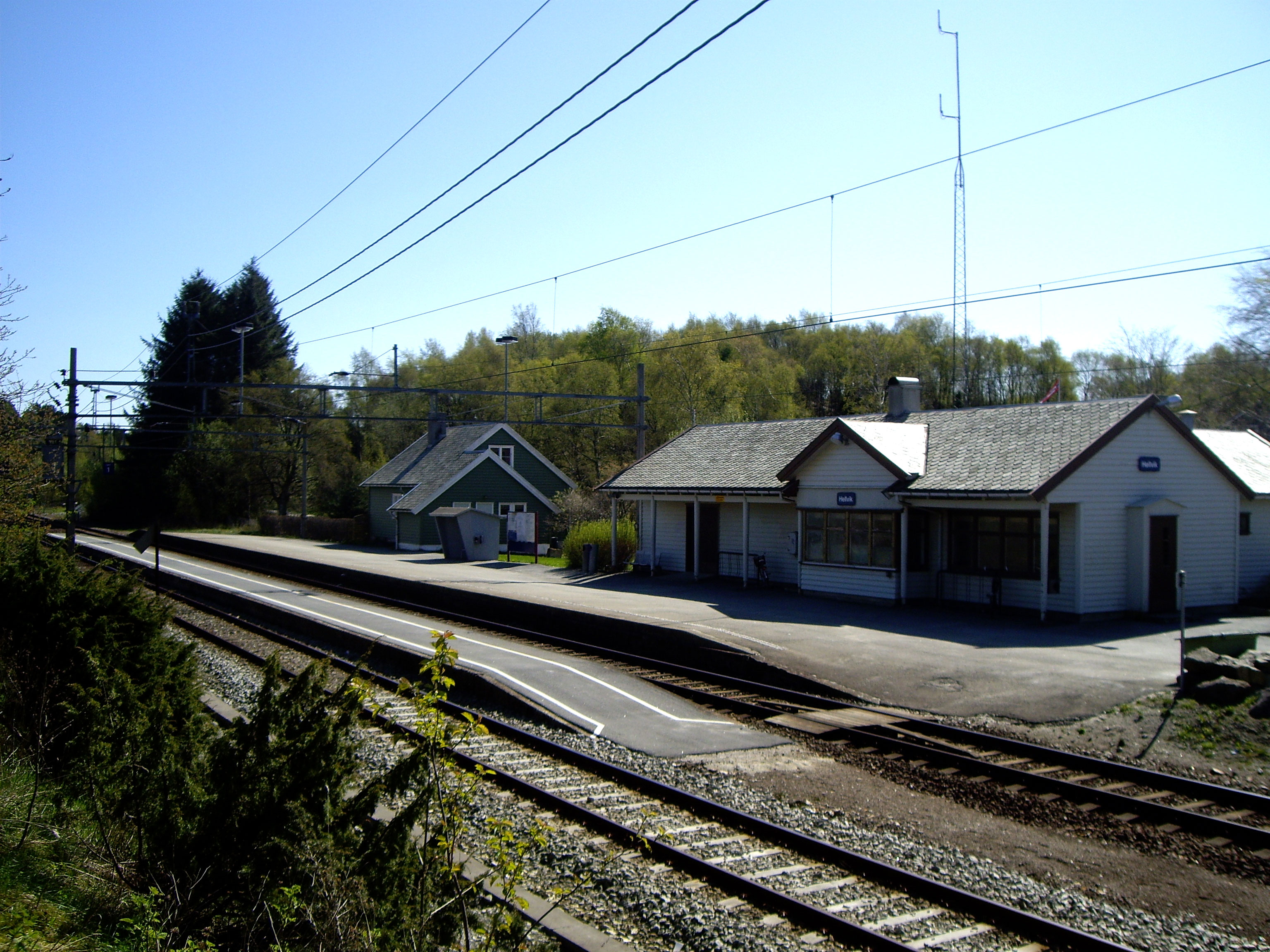

General information
- Location: Hellvik, Eigersund Municipality; Norway
- Coordinates: 58°29′8″N 5°53′51″E
- Elevation: 18.1 m (59 ft)
- Owner: Norwegian National Rail Administration
- Operator: Go-Ahead Norge
- Line: Sørlandet Line
- Distance: 532.70 km (331.00 mi)
- Platforms: 1
- Connections: Bus: Kolumbus

History
- Opened: 1879
Location

Hellvik Station (Norwegian: Hellvik stasjon) is a railway station located in the village of Hellvik in Eigersund Municipality in Rogaland county, Norway. The station is located along the Sørland Line about 66.79 kilometers (41.50 mi) south of the city of Stavanger. It is served by the Jæren Commuter Rail which runs between Stavanger and Egersund. The station was opened in 1879, one year after the Jæren Line.

== Gallery ==
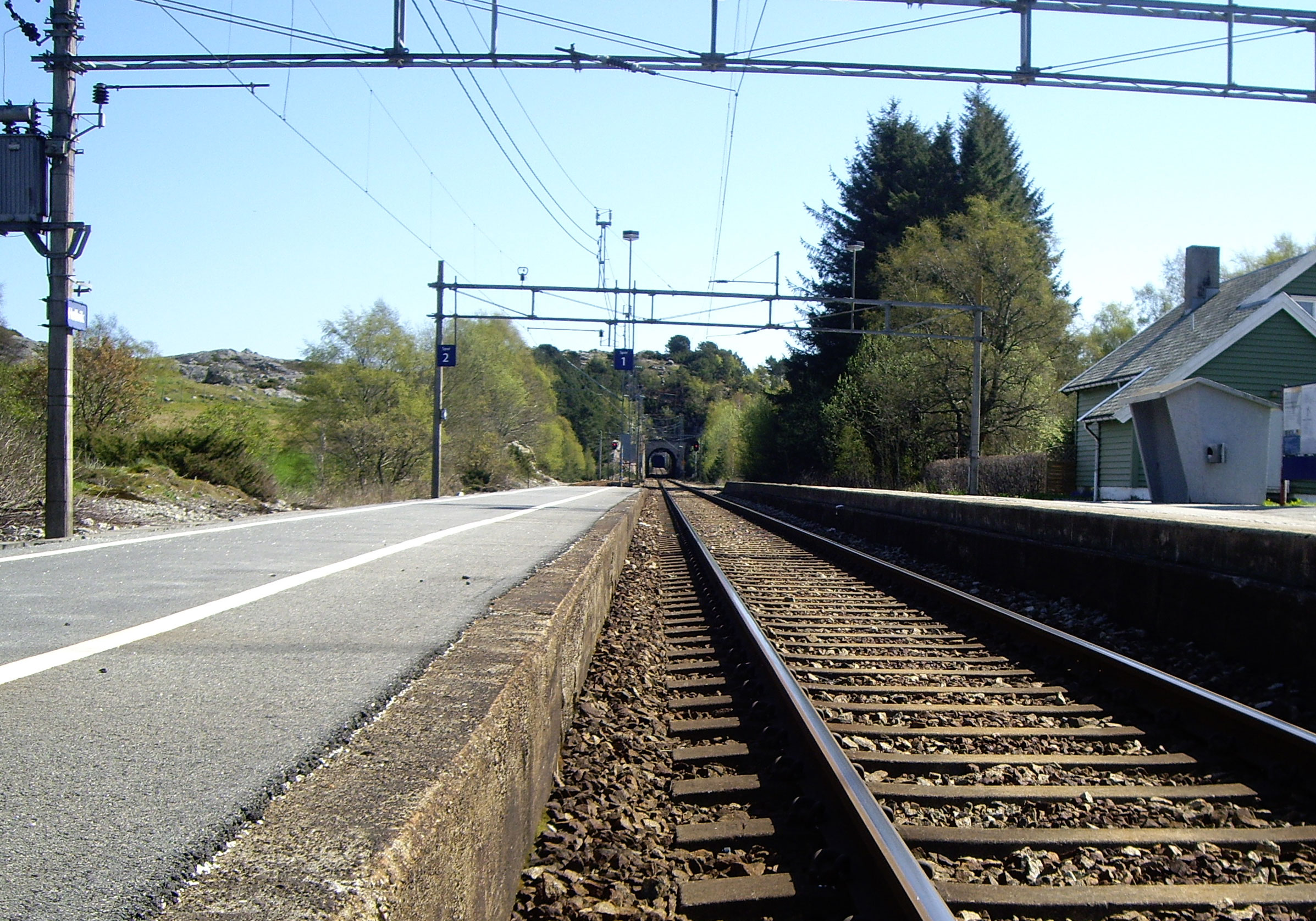
Looking south towards Egersund Station through the tunnels

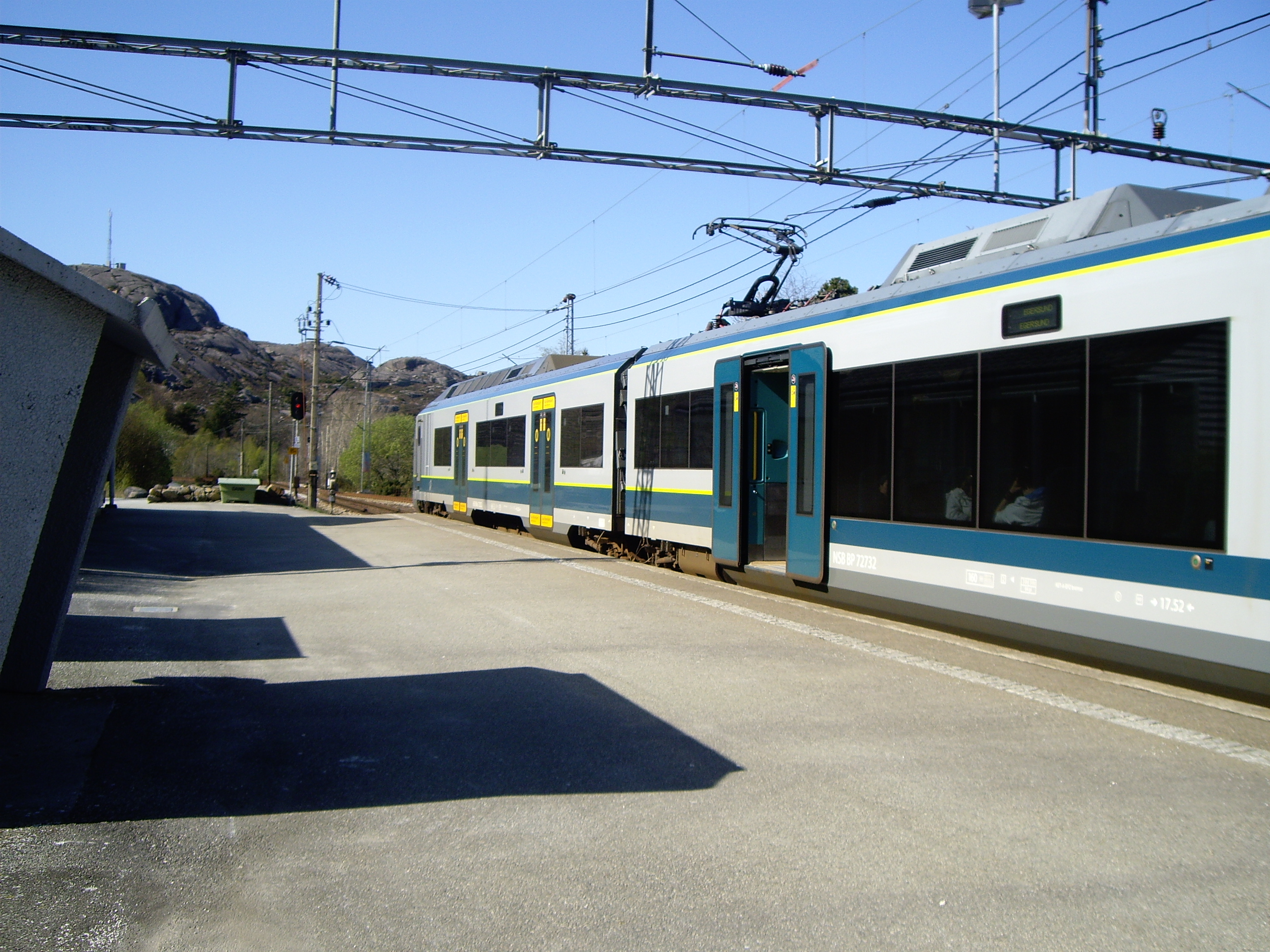
NSB Class 72

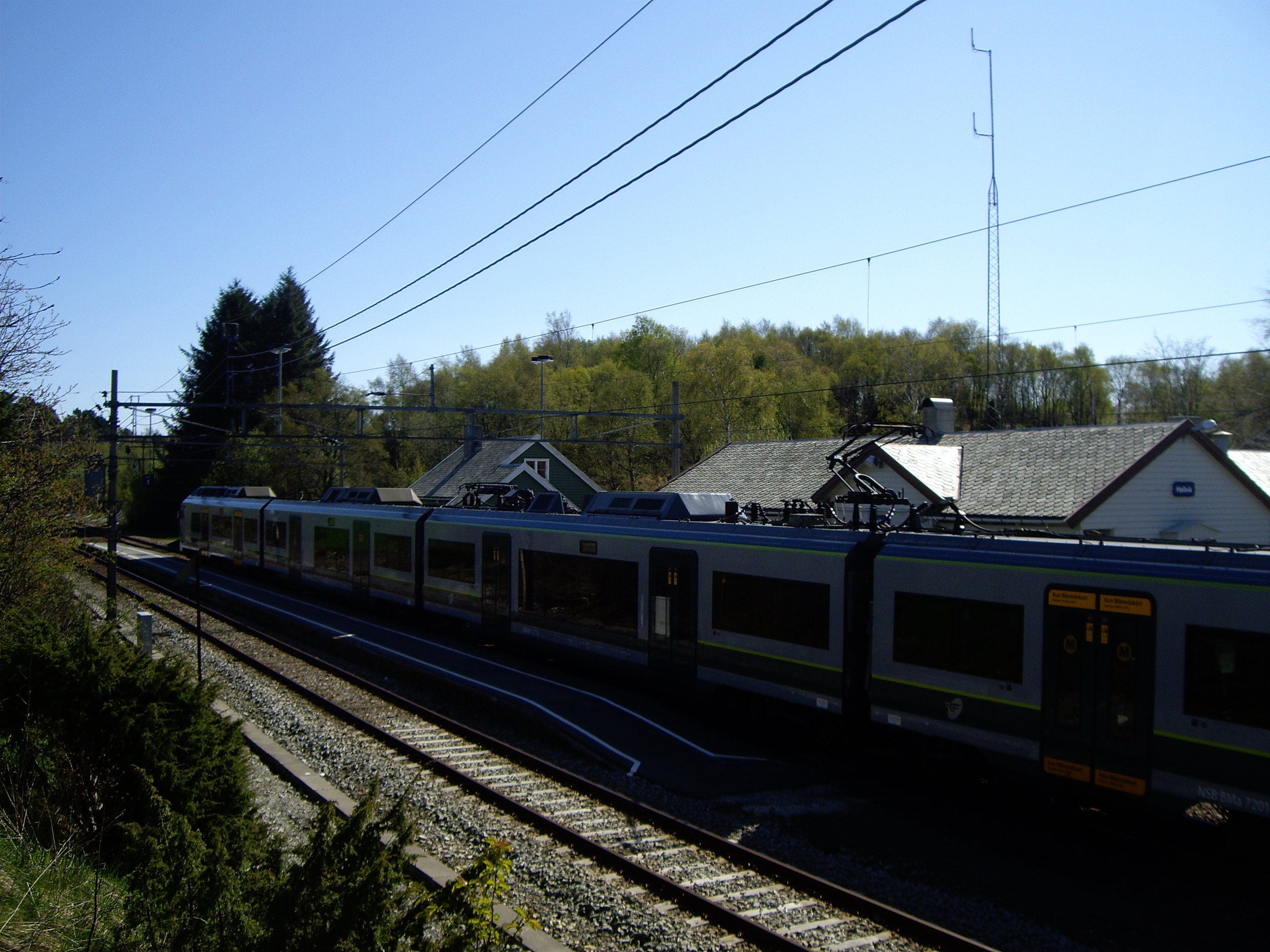
Hellvik Station with a train from Stavanger

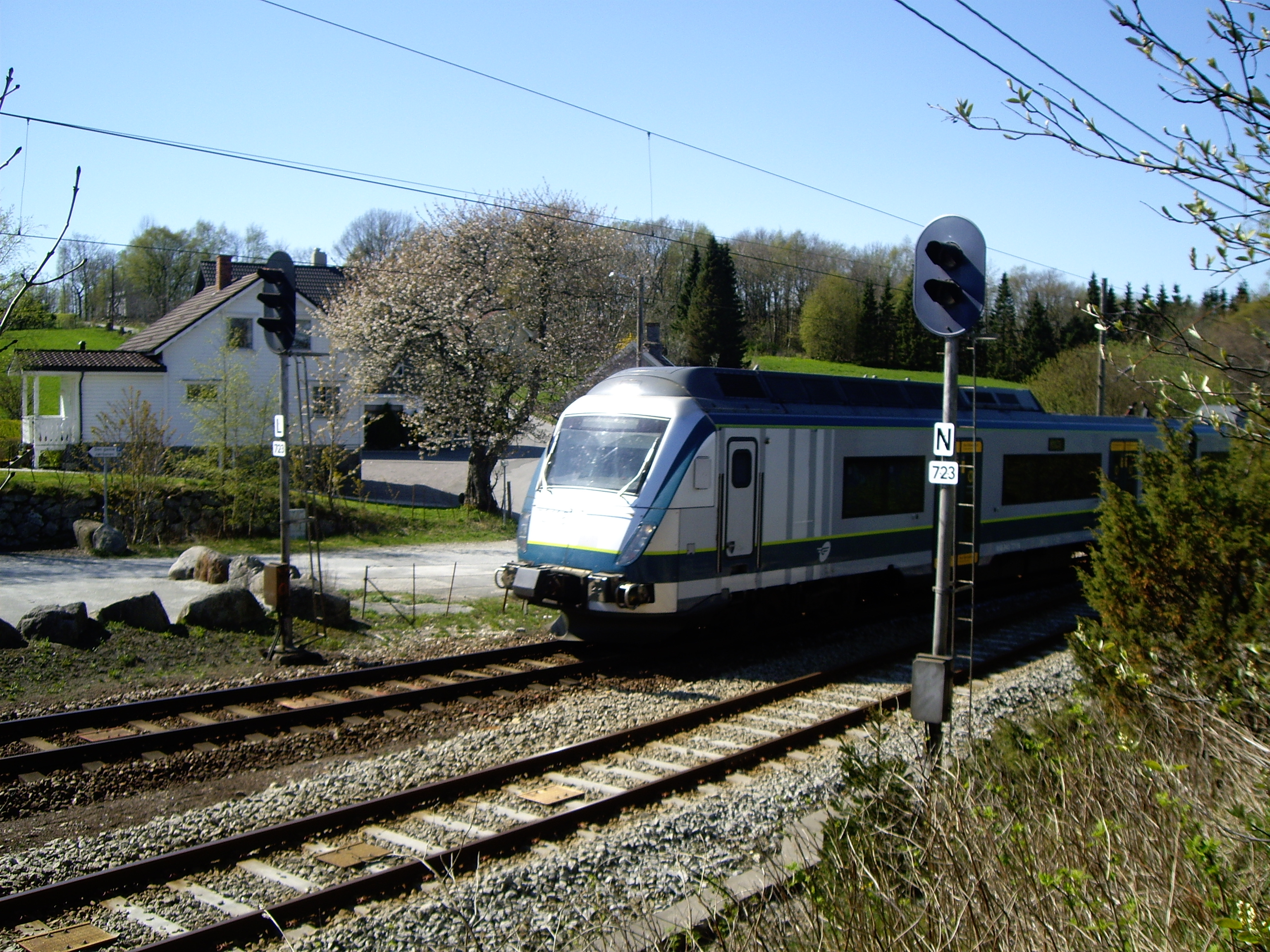
A local train arrives at the station

| Preceding station | Local trains | Following station |
|---|---|---|
| Sirevåg towards Stavanger | L5 Jæren Commuter Rail | Egersund Terminus |
