= Jæren Commuter Rail =

Commuter train service in Jæren, Norway

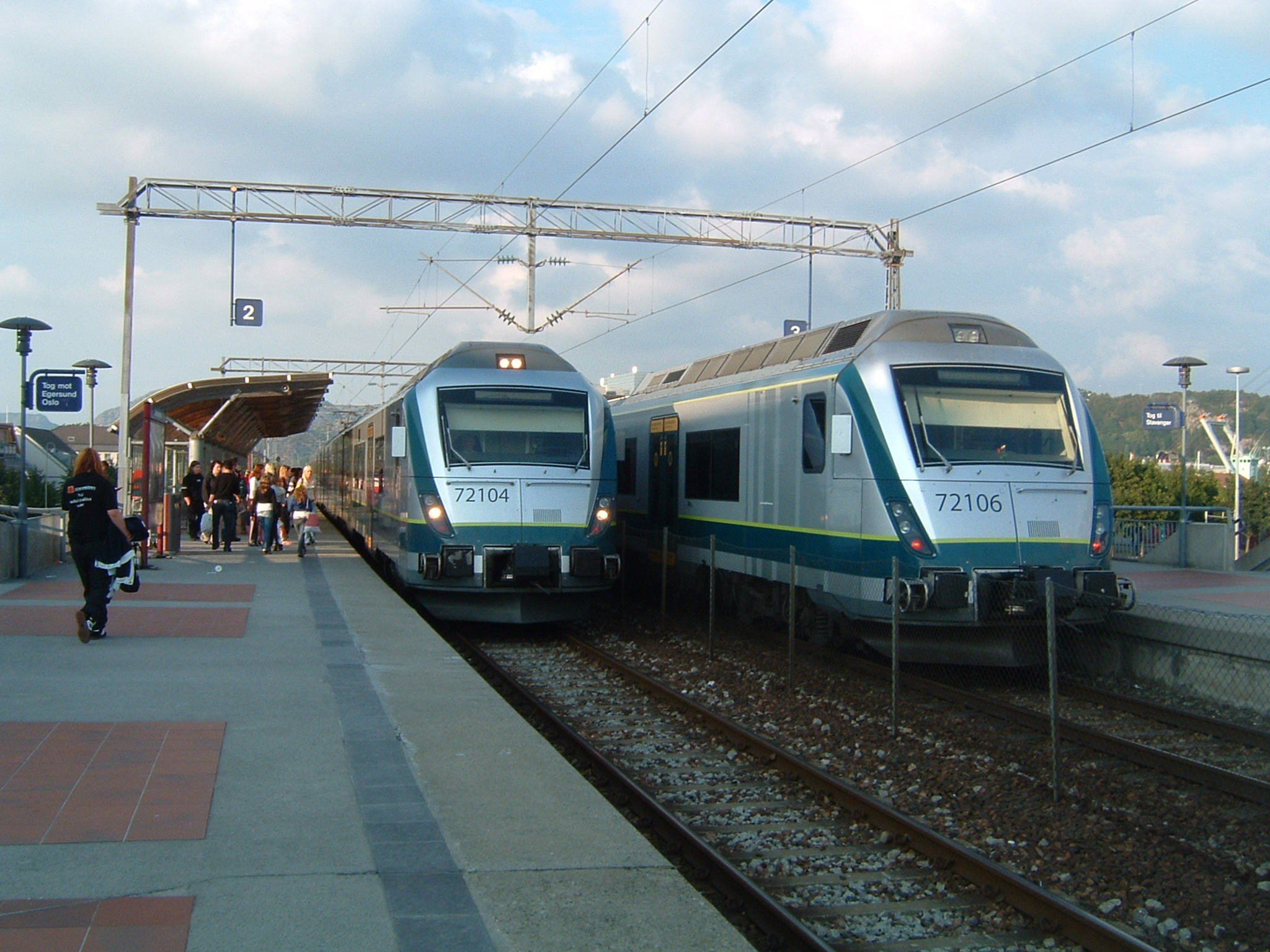

Overview
- Owner: Norwegian Railway Directorate
- Locale: Jæren, Norway
- Transit type: Commuter rail
- Number of lines: 1
- Number of stations: 19

Operation
- Began operation: 1 January 1992 (first section opened on 1 March 1878)
- Operator: Go-Ahead
- Number of vehicles: 12 Class 72

Technical
- System length: 75 km (47 mi)
- Track gauge: 1,435 mm (4 ft 8 1/2 in)

The Jæren Commuter Rail (Norwegian: Jærbanen) is a commuter train service operated along the westernmost part of the Sørland Line in Jæren, Norway. It is operated by Go-Ahead Norge with nine Class 72 electric multiple units. The service acts as a commuter rail connecting Stavanger to its suburbs, including Sandnes, and to municipalities further south: Klepp Municipality, Time Municipality, Hå Municipality and Eigersund Municipality. Although passenger services have operated along the lines since 1878, the commuter train service was inaugurated in 1992 with a significant increase of service, using existing rolling stock. Ridership of the system increased from 3.2 million in 2012 to 5 million in 2019.

The service runs from Stavanger Station to Egersund Station, a distance of 75 kilometers (47 mi). It has four hourly services from Stavanger to Sandnes Station, of which two continue to Nærbø Station and one to Egersund. The section from Stavanger to Sandnes is double track, while the rest is single track. The infrastructure is owned by the Norwegian National Rail Administration and the line is also used by intercity and freight trains. Several proposed upgrades to the system have been made, such as a branch along the Ålgård Line, a branch to Stavanger Airport, Sola and reestablishing double track from Sandnes to Egersund.

== Route ==
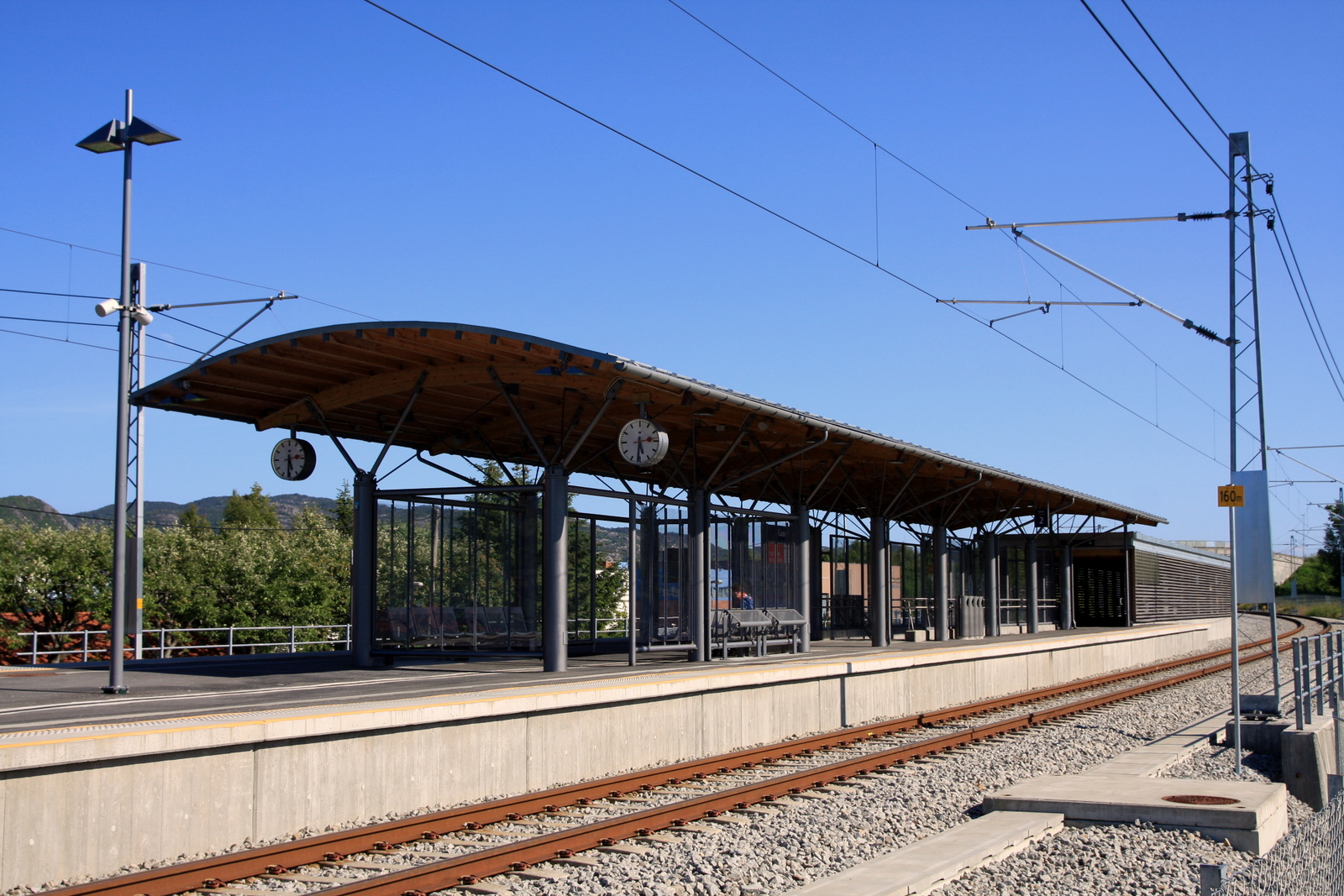
Gausel Station is one of the three new stations that opened in 2009

The commuter rail service runs along the full length of the Jæren Line, the old name of the section of the Sørland Line from Stavanger to Egersund. The line is standard gauge, electrified at 15 kV 16.7 Hz AC and owned by the Norwegian National Rail Administration. The line starts as double track at Stavanger Station, which is located in the central business district of Stavanger and is the terminal station of the Sørland Line. The station is staffed, serves intercity trains and is 10 minutes from the city's ferry terminal. Paradis Station is 1.4 kilometers (0.87 mi) from Stavanger and serves the residential areas of Storhaug and Våland. Around the station there will be established new office real estate. The station is within walking distance of Stavanger University Hospital and Godalen Upper Secondary School, and is adjacent to the offices of the County Governor.

Mariero Station is 4.1 kilometers (2.5 mi) from Stavanger and serves a mixed residential and commercial area, including Hetland Upper Secondary School. Jåttåvågen Station serves a new neighborhood and is within a minutes walk of Viking Stadion, the home ground of Eliteserien side Viking FK, Jåttå Upper Secondary School and the future offices of Aker Solutions. Gausel Station is located from 9 kilometers (5.6 mi) from Stavanger and serves a mixed commercial and residential area. In addition to being next to the offices of NOKAS, the station is the main interchange with buses towards Forus, which contains the offices of companies such as Statoil, Telenor and BP, and Stavanger Airport, Sola.

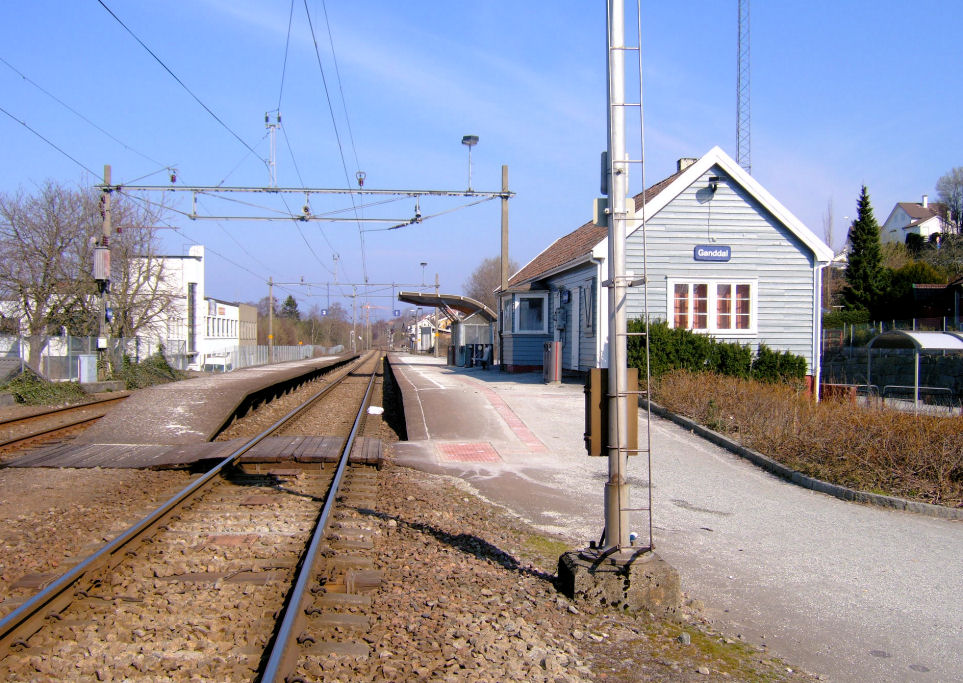
Ganddal Station

Sandnes Station (previously [Sandnes Sentrum Station], "Sandnes Center") is the first station located within Sandnes Municipality, and is located on a viaduct above the city center. Located 14.8 kilometers (9.2 mi) from Stavanger, it is also served by intercity trains and staffed. The station is the southern end of the double track. Skeiane Station (previously [Sandnes station]) is 15.4 kilometers (9.6 mi) from Stavanger and is located slightly south of city center of Sandnes. Some of the commuter trains terminate at Sandnes. Ganddal Station is 18.5 kilometers (11.5 mi) from Stavanger and serves the mixed residential and industrial area of Ganddal. The Ålgård Line branches off at the station.

Øksnevadporten Station is the first in Klepp Municipality and is located 22.4 kilometers (13.9 mi) from Stavanger. Klepp Station is located 24.8 kilometres (15.4 mi) from Stavanger and serves the municipal center of Klepp. Bryne Station is the only station in Time Municipality and located at Bryne, 29.8 kilometers (18.5 mi) from Stavanger. The station is staffed and also serves intercity trains.

Nærbø Station is the first station in Hå Municipality and serves the municipal center of Nærbø. Some commuter trains terminate at Nærbø. Varhaug Station is located 43.1 kilometers (26.8 mi) from Stavanger, while Vigrestad Station is located 40.2 kilometers (25.0 mi) from Stavanger. Brusand Station serves the residential area of Brusand and is located 54.2 kilometers (33.7 mi) from Stavanger. Ogna Station serves the residential area of Ogna and is located 58.4 kilometers (36.3 mi) from Stavanger. Sirevåg Station is located 60.4 kilometers (37.5 mi) from Stavanger and serves the fishing village of Sirevåg.

Hellvik Station is the first station in Eigersund Municipality and located 66.8 kilometers (41.5 mi) from Stavanger. Egersund Station is the terminal station of the line, and all remaining commuter trains stop there. The station is staffed and also served by intercity trains, and has correspondence with buses. The station located 74.7 kilometers (46.4 mi) from Stavanger is about 10 minutes north of the city center of Egersund.

== Service ==
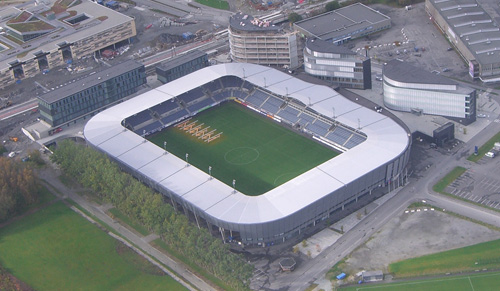
Jåttåvågen Station is located a minute's walk from Viking Stadion

The operating deficits are covered through subsidies by the Norwegian Ministry of Transport and Communications. The trackage and other infrastructure is owned by the government agency Bane NOR (Railway Infrastructure Company), while the rolling stock is owned and operated by Go-Ahead Nordic and CargoNet. The service between Stavanger and Sandnes operate with a fixed schedule every 15 minutes. Of the trains to Sandnes, half continue onwards to Nærbø, giving a 30-minute headway. One train per hour operate all the way to Egersund. On weekends and late evenings, there is a reduced service. Travel time from Stavanger to Sandnes is 19 minutes, from Stavanger to Nærbø is 37 minutes, and from Stavanger to Egersund is 1 hour and 7 minutes.

== Rolling stock ==
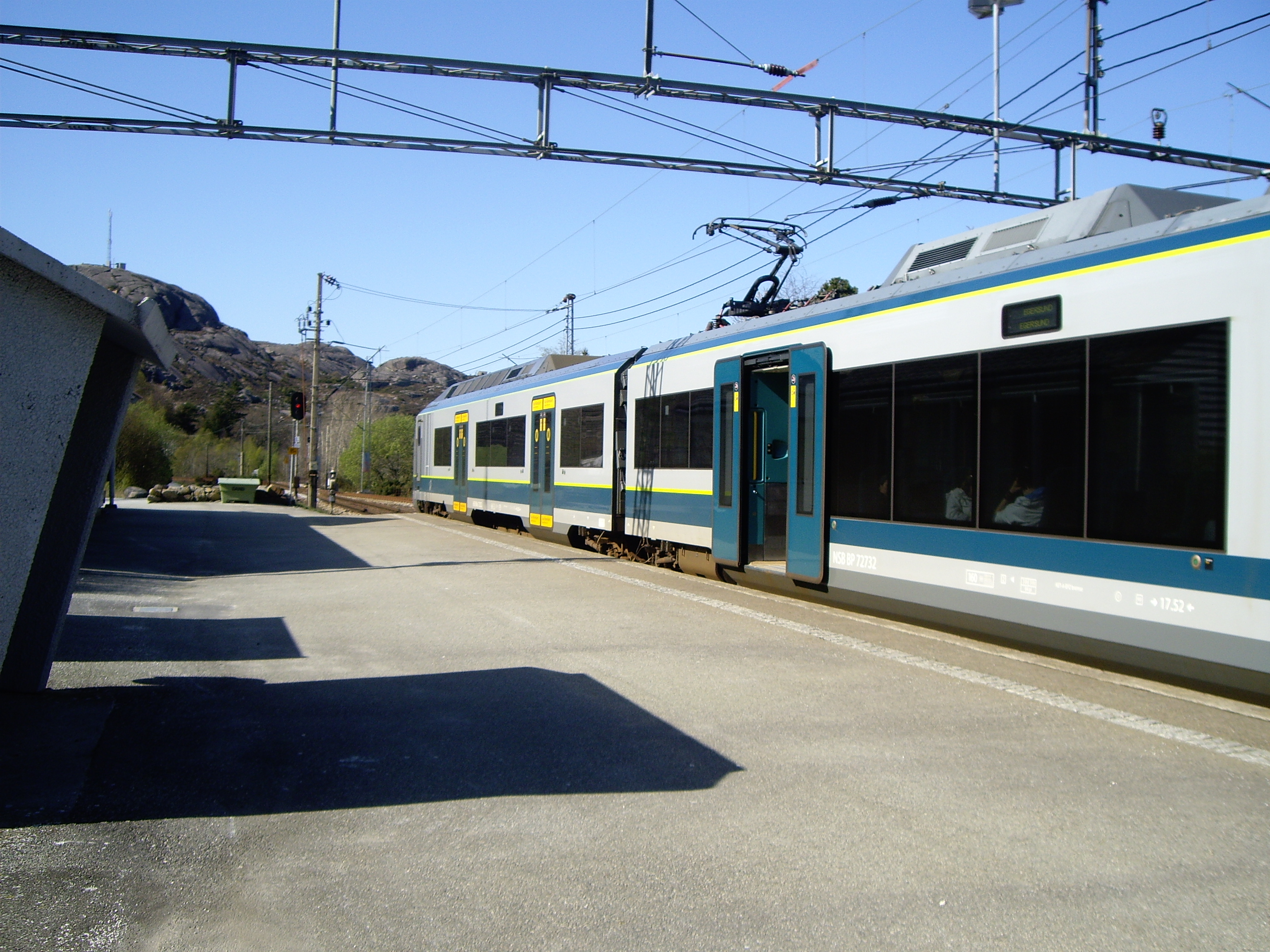
Class 72 train at Hellvik Station

Class 72 is a series of 36 four-car electric multiple units built by AnsaldoBreda. The units are permanently coupled together using Jacobs bogies. Each unit has a power output of 2,550 kilowatts (3,420 hp), allowing a top speed of 160 kilometers per hour (99 mph). The trains are 85.57 meters (280.7 ft) long and weigh 156 tonnes (154 long tons; 172 short tons), and have seating for 310 passengers and one toilet. The trains have better accessibility than the older units and unlike their predecessors are equipped with an electronic public information system. Twelve of the units are used on the Jæren Commuter Rail, while the remaining 24 units are used on the Oslo Commuter Rail.

=== Retired ===
Class 69 is a series of 88 two and three-car electric multiple units built by Strømmens Værksted between 1970 and 1993. A motor car has a power output of 1,188 kilowatts (1,593 hp), allowing a speed of 130 kilometers per hour (81 mph). Each car is 24.85 meters (81.5 ft) long, with motor cars weighing 64.0 to 53.9 tonnes (63.0 to 53.0 long tons; 70.5 to 59.4 short tons) and end cars weighing down to 28.8 tonnes (28.3 long tons; 31.7 short tons). Typical seating capacity is 96 passengers in the motor cars and 112 passengers in the end cars. The class was delivered in four versions, named A through D. After the initial delivery of fifteen 69As in 1970 and 1971, twenty 69Bs were delivered in 1974 and 1975. These were designed to operate on longer sections and were equipped with only one door per car. This turned out to extend stopping time too much, and the C and D versions were delivered with two doors per car. From 1975 to 1977, NSB took delivery of fourteen 69Cs and from 1983 to 1993 thirty-nine 69Ds. The latter is distinguishable because of its different front. NSB operates both two- and three-car sets, and up to three units can be run in multiple, allowing NSB to operate any train length from two to nine cars. Eighty-two units remain in service; although they have been retired from the Jæren Commuter Rail, NSB still uses them on the Oslo Commuter Rail, the Bergen Commuter Rail and the Arendal Line.

== History ==
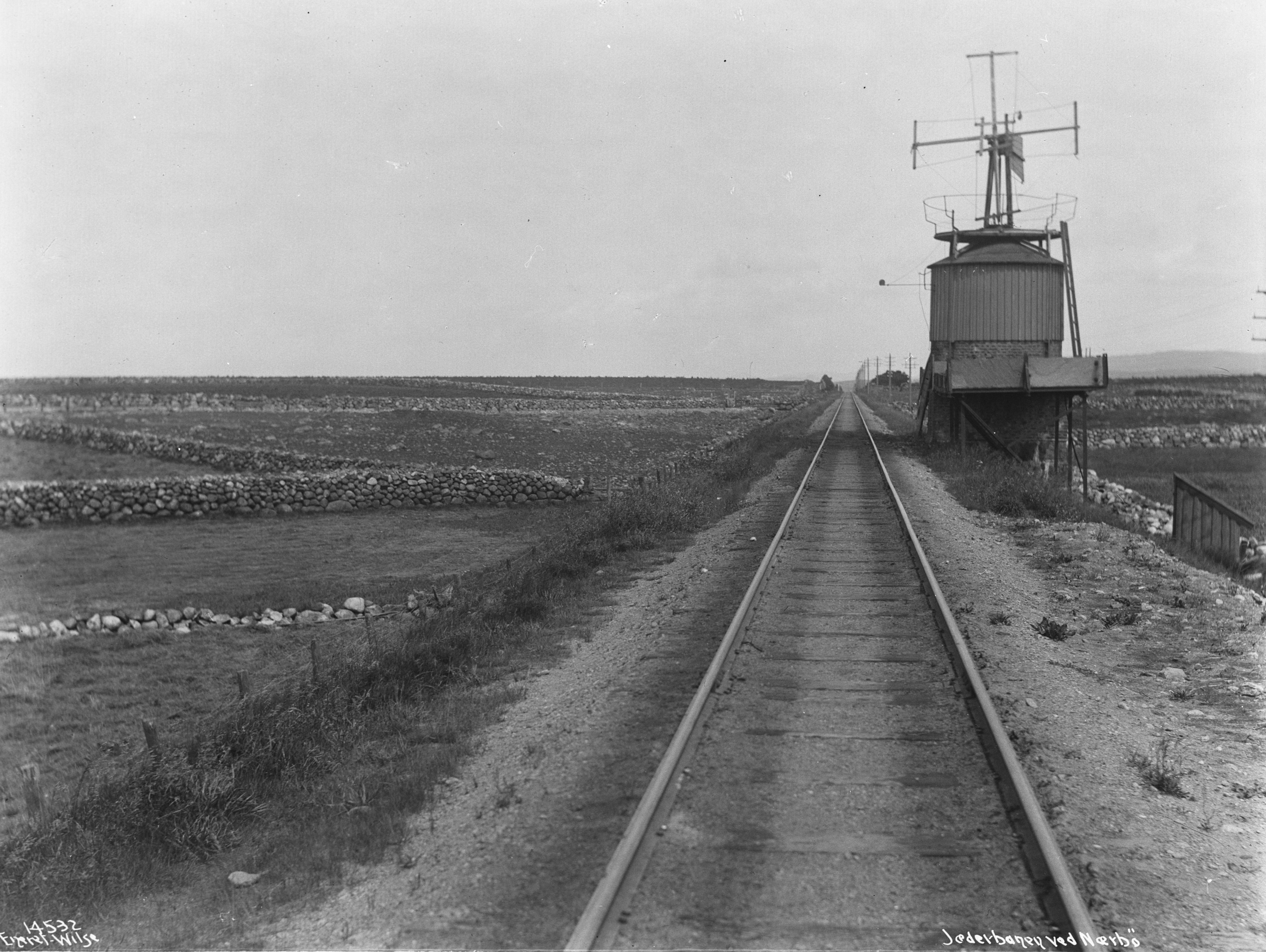
The Jæren Line passing a windmill in Hå Municipality in 1912. At the time, the railway was narrow gauge and nonelectrical.

The Jæren Line opened as a narrow gauge railway between Stavanger and Egersund on 1 March 1878. The railway was extended from Egersund to Flekkefjord on 1 November 1904 as the Flekkefjord Line. On 21 December 1924, the Jæren Line's only branch opened, the Ålgård Line from Ganddal to Ålgård. On 1 March 1944, the Jæren Line became part of the Sørland Line, when the line opened between Sira and Kristiansand and the Jæren Line was converted to standard gauge. The Sørland Line from Egersund to Stavanger was opened as electric on 3 June 1956. This resulted in Class 65 and Class 67 electric multiple units being used on local trains on the line. In 1960, the services were replaced by Class 68 units. The section from Stavanger to Sandnes became the first part of the Norwegian railway network, after the Ofoten Line, to be centrally controlled. The centralized traffic control opened from Stavanger to Sandnes on 20 March 1964, and from Sandnes to Egersund on 7 July. The whole line received partial automatic train control on 31 December 1986.

The commuter rail system was introduced from 1 January 1992, after an agreement between NSB, Rogaland County Municipality and the six municipalities along the line. NSB introduced new Class 69 multiple units, while the county municipality introduced a fare coordination with the corresponding bus services. The increase in service involved 15 departures per direction per day, and the travel time from Stavanger to Egersund was reduced from 80 to 55 minutes. In addition, NSB started with a half-hour headway between Stavanger and Sandnes. A new station, Sandnes Sentrum, was opened in the city center of Sandnes at the time the new service started. NSB stated that the goal was to increase the daily ridership from 2,900 to 5,000 passengers by 1994. The stations were also upgraded, including new sheds. The Scanet train radio system was installed between 1993 and 1996.

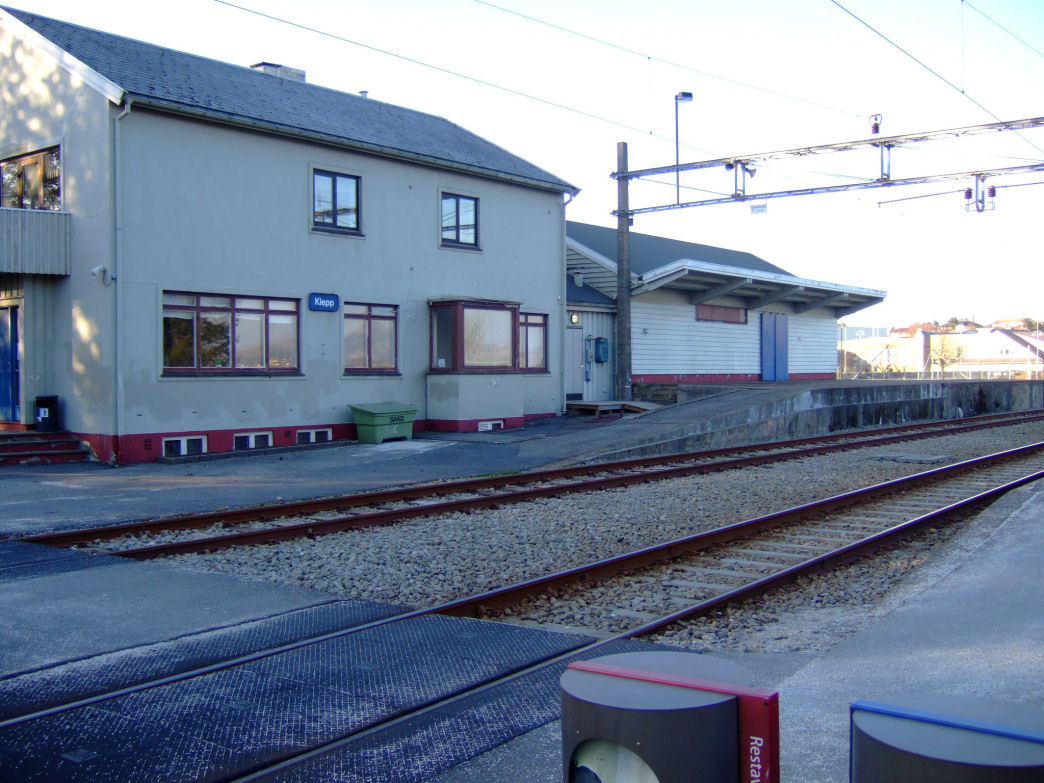
Klepp Station

The service was a success, and NSB received a 112% increase in ridership the first year. This resulted in the company introducing a similar service between Trondheim and Innherred, the Trøndelag Commuter Rail, in 1993. In 1993, NSB won Statens Byggeskikkpris, among other things for the new sheds on the Jæren Line. By 1995, ridership was up 150% from before the service started. In 1997, NSB announced that they would order 36 new electric multiple units, which would among other things replace the aging trains on the Jæren Commuter Rail. The new Class 72 trains were put into service on 8 August 2002, several years behind schedule. In April 2004, the rail administration opened Jåttå Station, which was located close to Viking Stadion, the new home ground of Tippeligaen side Viking FK.

By 2005, ridership had increased to 2.5 million per year, up 278% from 1991, giving a 7% market share in the corridor. To further increase capacity and regularity, the Norwegian National Rail Administration decided to rebuild the section from Stavanger to Sandnes to double track. At the same time, a new freight terminal was to be built at Ganddal, meaning that the section would only have to be shared with intercity trains. The upgrade involved closing Hillevåg Station, and building three new stations: Paradis, Jåttåvågen and Gausel. Construction was started in 2006 and was estimated to be completed by 2009. It was estimated to cost 2.2 billion Norwegian krone. From April to November 2009, the section from Ganddal to Stavanger was closed while the last part of the upgrade was completed. The new line was opened on 16 November 2009 and from 14 December, the 15-minute headway was introduced between Stavanger and Sandnes.

In October 2018, Go-Ahead Norway entered into an agreement with Norwegian Railway Directorate to deliver train services on Sørlandsbanen, Arendalsbanen and Jærbanen from 15 December 2019 (a service titled Sørtoget, "Southern Train"). The company sought to increase the frequency of trains on the Jæren Commuter rail.

== Future ==
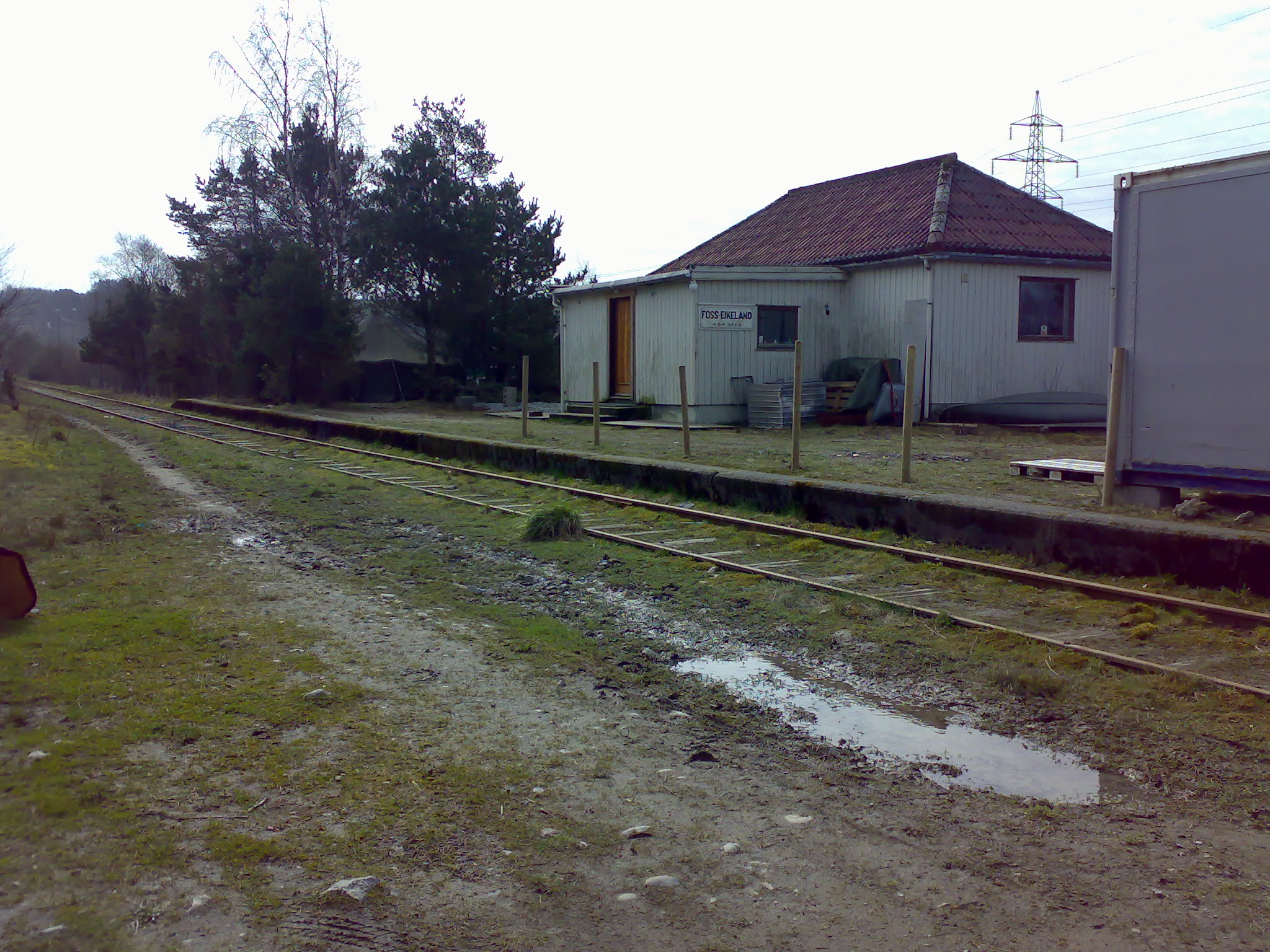
The Ålgård Line, here at Foss-Eikeland, has been closed for passenger traffic since 1955, but is proposed as a new service on the Jæren Commuter Rail

The National Rail Administration has developed a plan for possible expansion of the commuter rail. The main possibilities have been discussed: rebuilding the section from Sandnes to Egersund to double track, taking back into use the Ålgård Line, which branches off at Ganddal, and building a new branch from south of Gausel to Stavanger Airport, Sola. An alternative to several of the options is a light rail, which may or may not be built as a tram-train, which would use parts of the existing double track between Stavanger and Sandnes.

The Ålgård Line is a 12.24-kilometer (7.61 mi) long railway which branches from the Sørland Line at Ganddal. It runs via Foss-Eikeland and Figgjo to Ålgård, and was opened on 20 December 1924. Passenger services were terminated on 1 November 1955, making it the line with the most frequent passenger traffic in Norway to be closed. Freight trains operated until 1988. The first 3 kilometers (1.9 mi) are used for freight trains to access a cement factory. The line has officially been closed, but has not been abandoned. The National Rail Administration retains ownership and can in the future renovate the line for operation. The annual traffic potential for the Ålgård Line is 600,000 passengers. Plans call for stations at Vagle, Figgjo, Kongeparken and Ålgård. It is possible to operate the trains that currently terminate at Sandnes to Ålgård without new infrastructure investments to the Sørland Line. However, the line would need a full upgrade, including new tracks, electric system and signaling. Ålgård is also a good location for a park and ride for European Route E39.

A branch to Sola has been considered to allow the trains to operate to Sola and the airport. The line would branch from the Sørland Line south of Gausel, and be built so trains from the branch could run both northwards and southwards. Proposed stations include the airport, Solakrossen, Forus West, Statoil's head office and possibly the shopping center Kvadrat. This would give a travel time of 17 minutes from the airport to the city center, and 10 minutes from the airport to Sandnes. This route has, however, also been proposed as part of the light rail system. It would give about 2.5 million annual passengers.

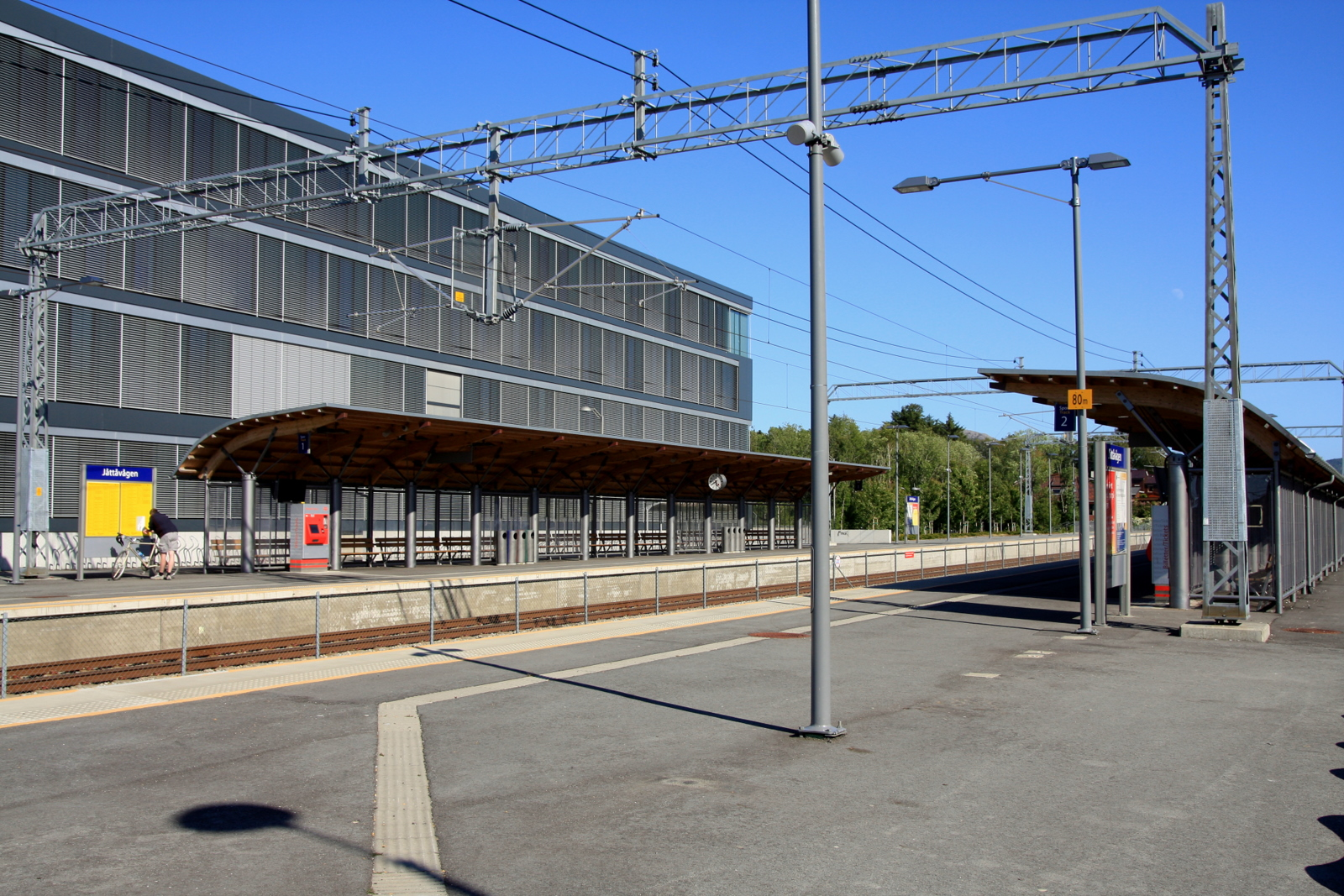
Jåttåvågen Station opened in 2009 along the new double track section

Plans have been made that would either double or triple the frequency on all the services on the existing commuter rail network. However, increased frequency south of Sandnes will require double track. Should the frequency be doubled, double track would have to be built to where the current service to Nærbø terminates. Plans call for these trains to possibly be extended to either Varhaug or Vigrestad. Should the frequency be tripled, double track would be needed all the way to Egersund. Parts of the Jæren Line is straight enough to permit speeds between 200 and 250 kilometers per hour (120 and 160 mph). However, several shorter parts need to be rebuilt to allow this, particularly between Egersund and Ogna, and from Bryne to Ganddal. In particular, the section from Ogna to Egersund would probably have to follow an all-new route, should it be rebuilt to double track. The effect of higher maximum speeds is greatest for intercity trains, as the commuter trains have so frequent stops they have little to gain from the increased speeds.

When the Jæren Line was built, the station in Egersund was located in the city center. With the opening of the Sørland Line, the station was moved 1 kilometre (0.62 mi) north of the city center. Egersund Station has been proposed moved back to its old location for the commuter rail, giving Egersund two stations: one for commuter trains and one for regional trains. The right-of-way still exists for this route, making construction easy. A new Sørland Line has also been proposed, which would run south instead of north from Egersund. This would mean that a city center location for Egersund Station would be better for intercity trains as well.

Rogaland County Municipality is in the planning process of building a light rail in Greater Stavanger. The initial plans call for a Y-shaped service which could be operational by 2018, with possibilities for further expansion. As of 2010, the plans call for a 16.2 kilometres (10.1 mi) line from Stavanger to Sandnes, and a 7.7 or 8.8 kilometres (4.8 or 5.5 mi) branch to the airport. The travel time from Sandnes to Stavanger would be 29 minutes, and is therefore a supplement to the commuter rail. The light rail would have interchange with the light rail at Stavanger, Paradis, Jåttåvågen, Gausel and Sandnes Sentrum. Several new branches of the light rail have been proposed for later construction.
