= Jåttå Upper Secondary School =

Coordinates: 58°54′48″N 5°43′42″E

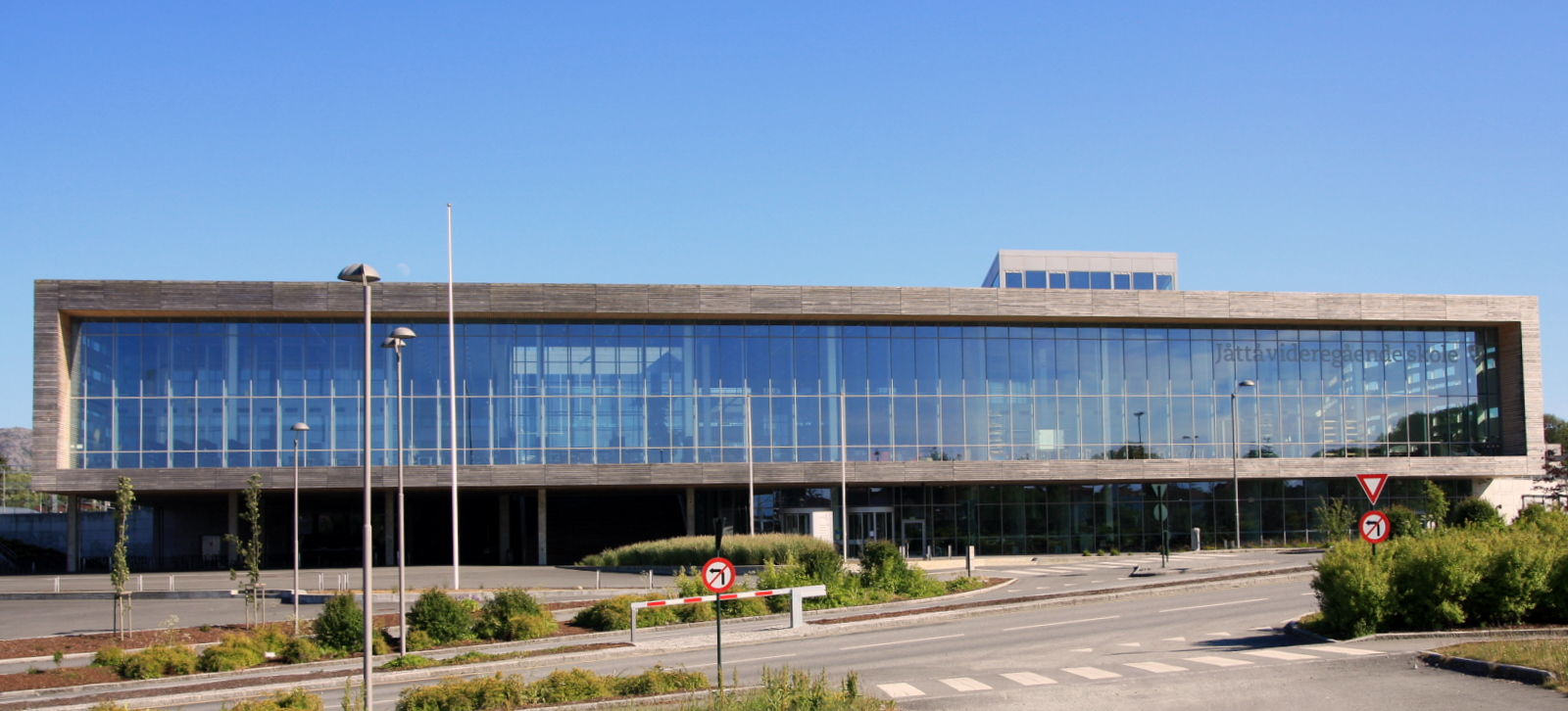
- Jåtten, Stavanger; Norway

Information
- Type: Upper Secondary School
- Established: 2007
- Rector: Tove Vatsvåg Nylund
- Website: www.jaattaa.vgs.no

Jåttå Upper Secondary School (Norwegian: Jåttå videregående skole) is an upper secondary school in Jåtten, Stavanger, Norway, with 1000 pupils. It was opened for the 2007-08 semester. It is the only school in Rogaland with a "built-in" train station; the train station Jåttåvågen is located just outside the schoolyard of the school.
