= NSB Class 72 =

Norwegian passenger train

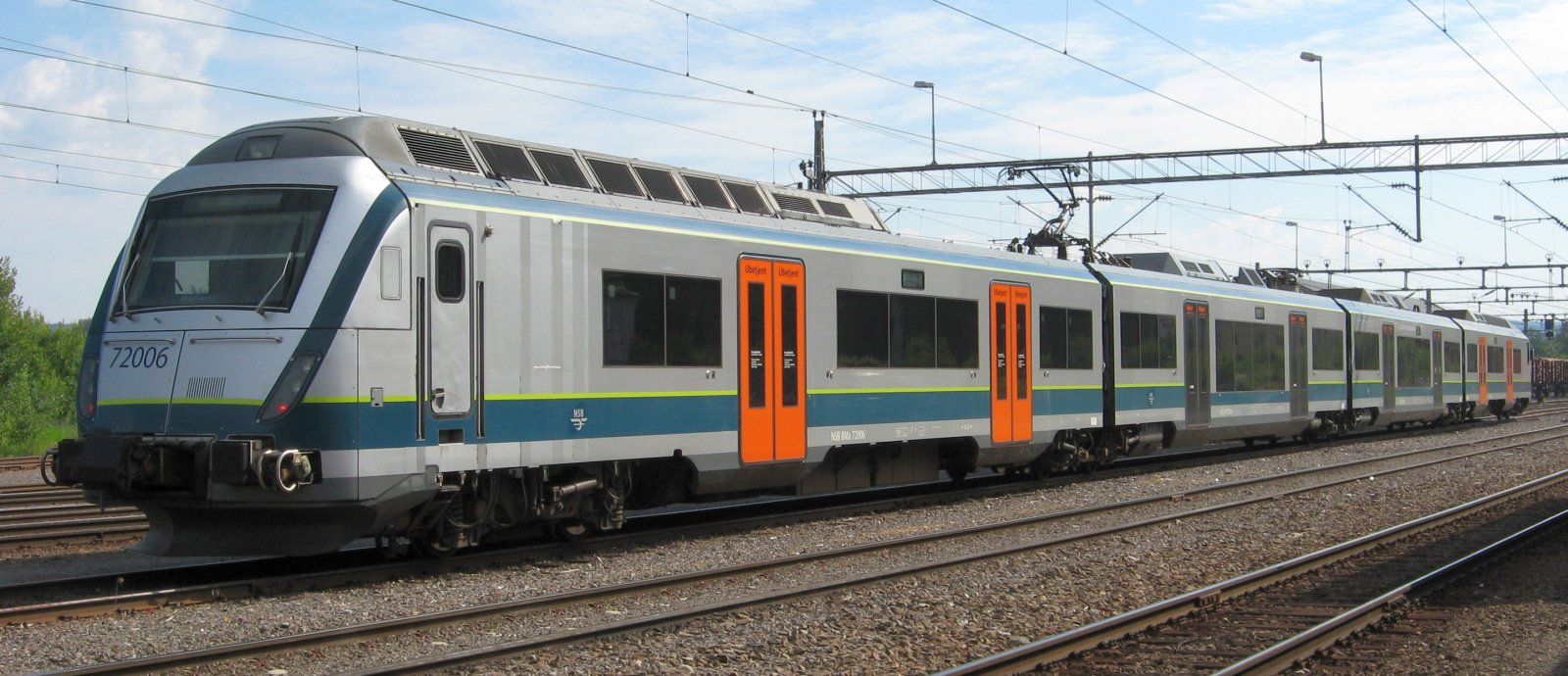
- In service: 2002–present
- Manufacturer: AnsaldoBreda
- Number built: 36
- Formation: 4 cars
- Capacity: 310
- Operators: Go-Ahead Norge; Vy
- Lines served: L1 (Oslo Commuter Rail); L5 (Jæren Commuter Rail)

Specifications
- Train length: 85.570 m (280 ft 9 in)
- Car length: 21.975 m (72 ft 1 in) (ends); 20.125 m (66 ft 0 in) (center)
- Width: 3.100 m (10 ft 2 in)
- Height: 4.250 m (13 ft 11 in)
- Maximum speed: 160 km/h (100 mph)
- Weight: 60.6 tonnes (59.6 long tons; 66.8 short tons) (ends); 40.5 tonnes (39.9 long tons; 44.6 short tons) (center)
- Power output: 2,550 kW (3,420 hp)
- Electric system: 15 kV 16.7 Hz AC Catenary
- Current collection: Pantograph
- Bogies: Conventional (At each end); FEBA coupled single axle bogies (Between cars)
- Track gauge: 1,435 mm (4 ft 8 1/2 in)

NSB Class 72 (Norwegian: NSB type 72) is a class of 36 electric multiple units built by AnsaldoBreda for the Norwegian State Railways (now Vy). Delivered between 2002 and 2005, the four-car units operate on the Oslo Commuter Rail and the Jæren Commuter Rail. The trains have a capacity of 310 passengers and the 2,250 kilowatts (3,020 hp) motors allow a maximum speed of 160 kilometres per hour (99 mph). The trains were ordered in 1997, with original delivery dates in 2001 and 2002. NSB also had an option to buy 40 additional units. The first units were not delivered until 2002, and by 2004, still half the trains were not in use. Faults included rust, too heavy train weight, and signaling problems. After the initial troubles, the Class 72 has been a highly successful train for NSB and well liked by the maintenance workers.

== History ==
By the mid-1990s, NSB was in need of new electric multiple units to supplement and replace the company's aging fleet of Class 69 units. At the time, NSB had 60 Class 69 units operating in the Oslo area, of which at any time four to eight were out of service. In 1997, NSB stated that they intended to order 36 new units, of which 18 would replace aging units and 18 would be used to increase services. This was seen as the first step in an order of 100 new EMUs that would be needed in the coming 20 years. The order was part of a holistic ordering program through which NSB in the late 1990s ordered the El 18, Di 6, the Class 71, Class 73 and Class 93. In August, NSB stated that there were three bidders for the local train class, which would consist of a firm order for 36 units with an option for another 20 units. The bidders were Ansaldo, GEC Alstom and Adtranz, where Adtranz had the only bid which would involve construction in Norway.

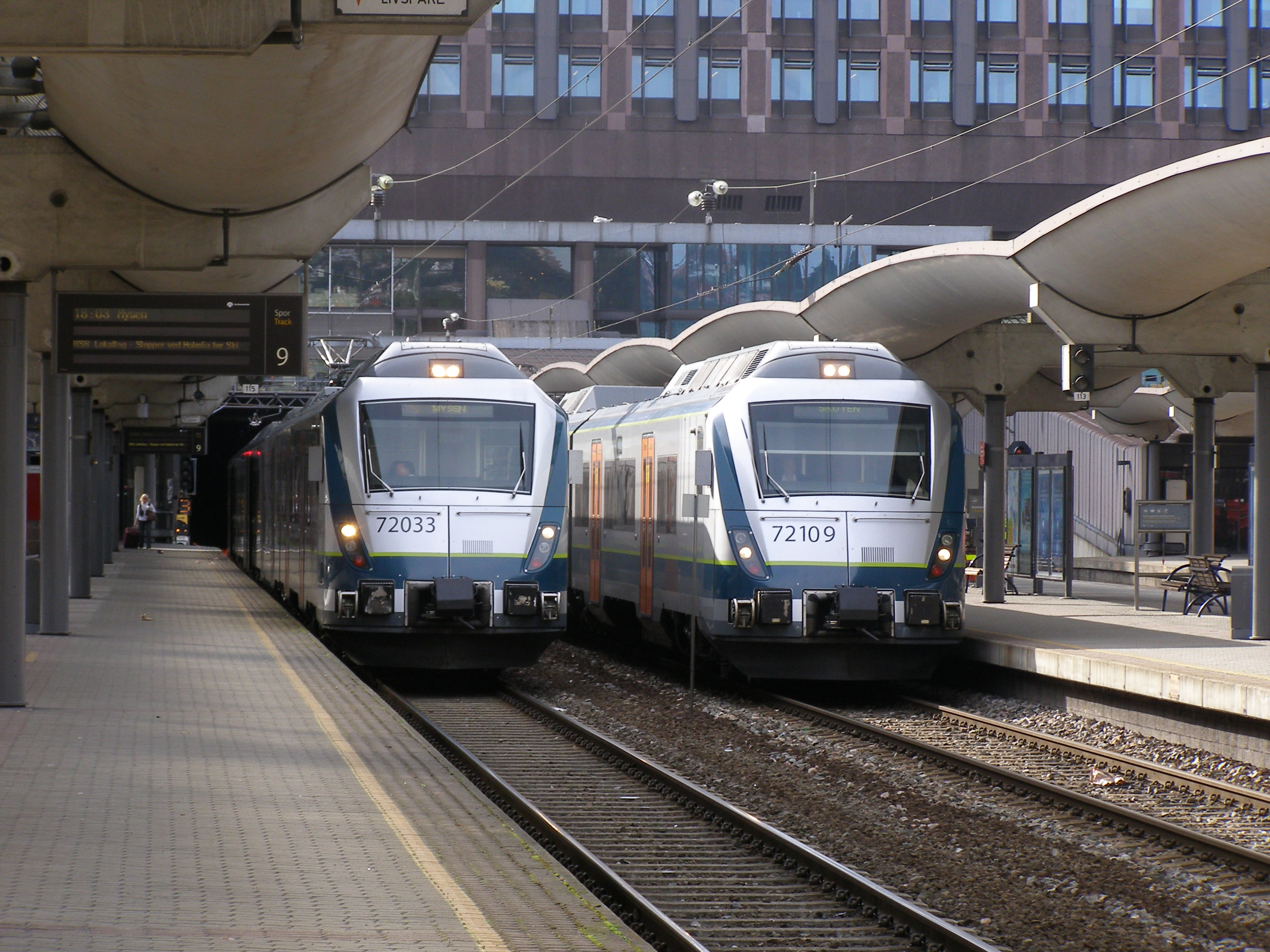
72.033 and 72.109 at Oslo Central Station

On 26 September 1997, NSB announced that they would order 36 new trains from Ansaldo, with an option for an additional 40 units. Each train would cost 50 million Norwegian krone (NOK), and NSB had 28 months to use their option. NSB's CEO, Osmund Ueland, stated that Ansaldo had been chosen because they had the best technical offer and had by far the lowest price. The new trains would have 35% lower maintenance costs and use 33% less electricity than the Class 69. The new trains would also have a higher maximum speed, have wider doors and make less noise. The electronics would be delivered by Ansaldo, the superstructure by Breda and the bogies by Swiss Locomotive and Machine Works (SLM). The estimated date of delivery for the trains was from 1 July 2000 to 1 July 2001. The exterior and interior design was made by Pininfarina, with assistance from NSB's own designers. The latter were used to tailor the design to the Norwegian public's preferences, which among other things involved use of wood in the interior. At the time, Ansaldo also had an order for the Oslo Tramway's SL95.

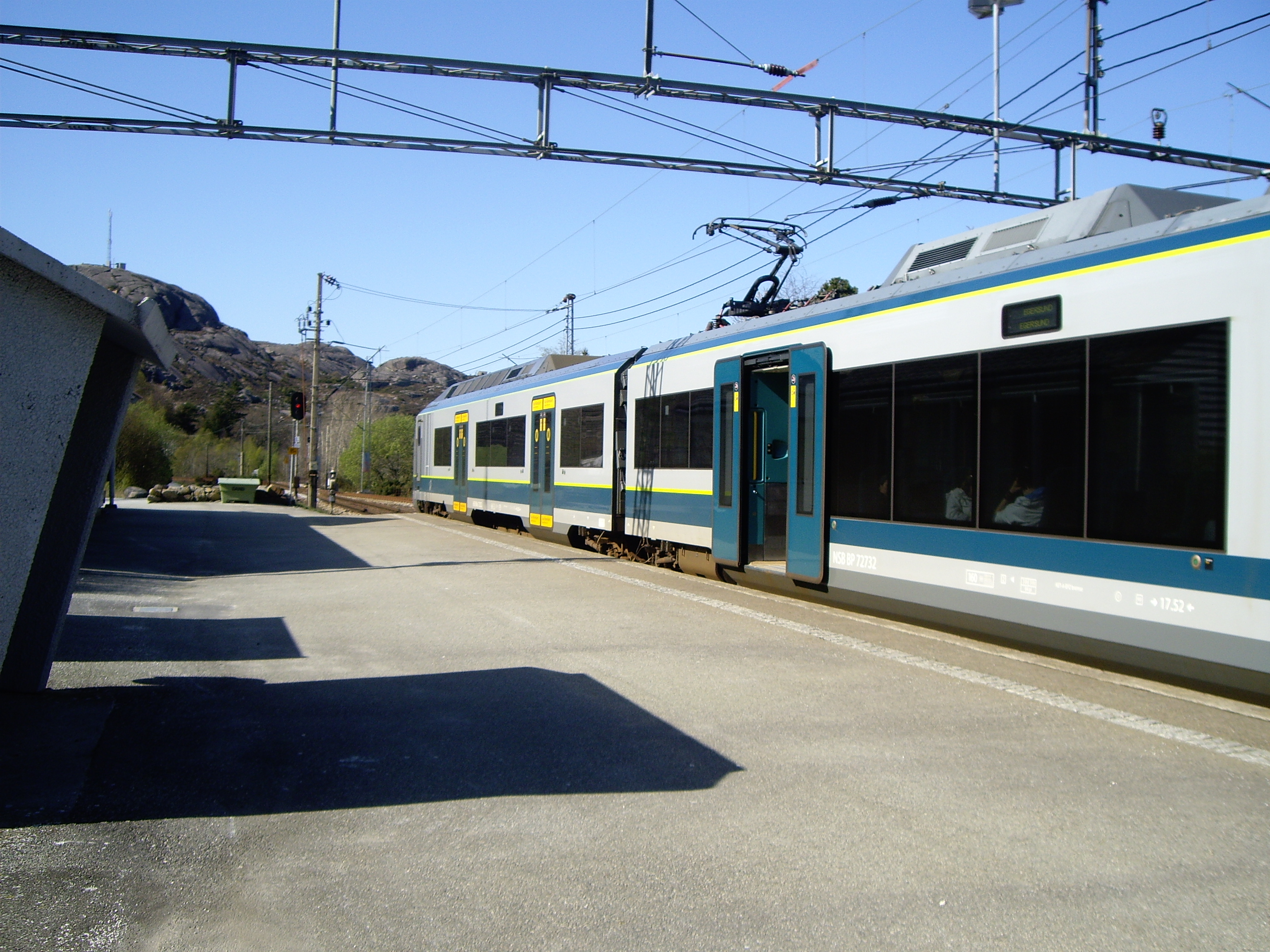
Unit at Hellvik Station of the Jæren Commuter Rail

In 1999, NSB announced that they would be rebranding their services, and that commuter trains would be branded at NSB Puls. They would lose their traditional red color and instead be colored green and silver, with the Class 72 being the first trains to receive the new design. In February 2001, the first train arrived to Norway for testing. The delay was caused by errors in the drawings and the bankruptcy of a supplier. In April it was announced that the trains were too heavy to allow standing passengers, since the trains could then exceed the permitted axle weight. To reduce the weight, the trains needed to have some steel parts replaced with aluminium. NSB stated that the situation was problematic both because they had calculated the need for standing places to handle rush-hour traffic, and because it was impossible for them to control if more people than there were seats for would board a train. NSB stated that part of the problem was that they could not order shelf ware, in part because the Norwegian loading gauge is wider than in Continental Europe. By September, a solution had been found whereby the weight had been reduced sufficiently that 350 standing passengers could be taken on each train. The trains were delivered with the train radio system Scanet, but the technology was so out of date that there was only a five-year warranty. At the time, it was uncertain when Global System for Mobile Communications – Railway (GSM-R) would be built for the Norwegian rail network, and NSB feared there could arise a situation in which the trains could not be used, if the construction were not accelerated.

The first scheduled service with a Class 72 train occurred on 8 August 2002 on the Jæren Commuter Rail. NSB stated that they had never previously spent so much time testing equipment before putting it into service, and that the Jæren had been chosen for the introduction because the single-line system was easier to operate than the services around Oslo. The company also stated that they hoped all the trains would be in service by the end of 2003. By January 2003, half the trains had been delivered, and were gradually being put into service on the Oslo Commuter Rail. However, on the Gardermoen Line the electronics from the train were interfering with the signaling systems, so the lights would switch from green to red before the train passed, instead of afterwards. This made it impossible for the NSB to put the train into service on Norway's only high-speed line. Another problem was that the trains would not close the doors if they were at a station without level tracks, although this was quickly solved. In 2003, NSB decided to abandon the Puls concept, and revert to the former single-profile strategy.

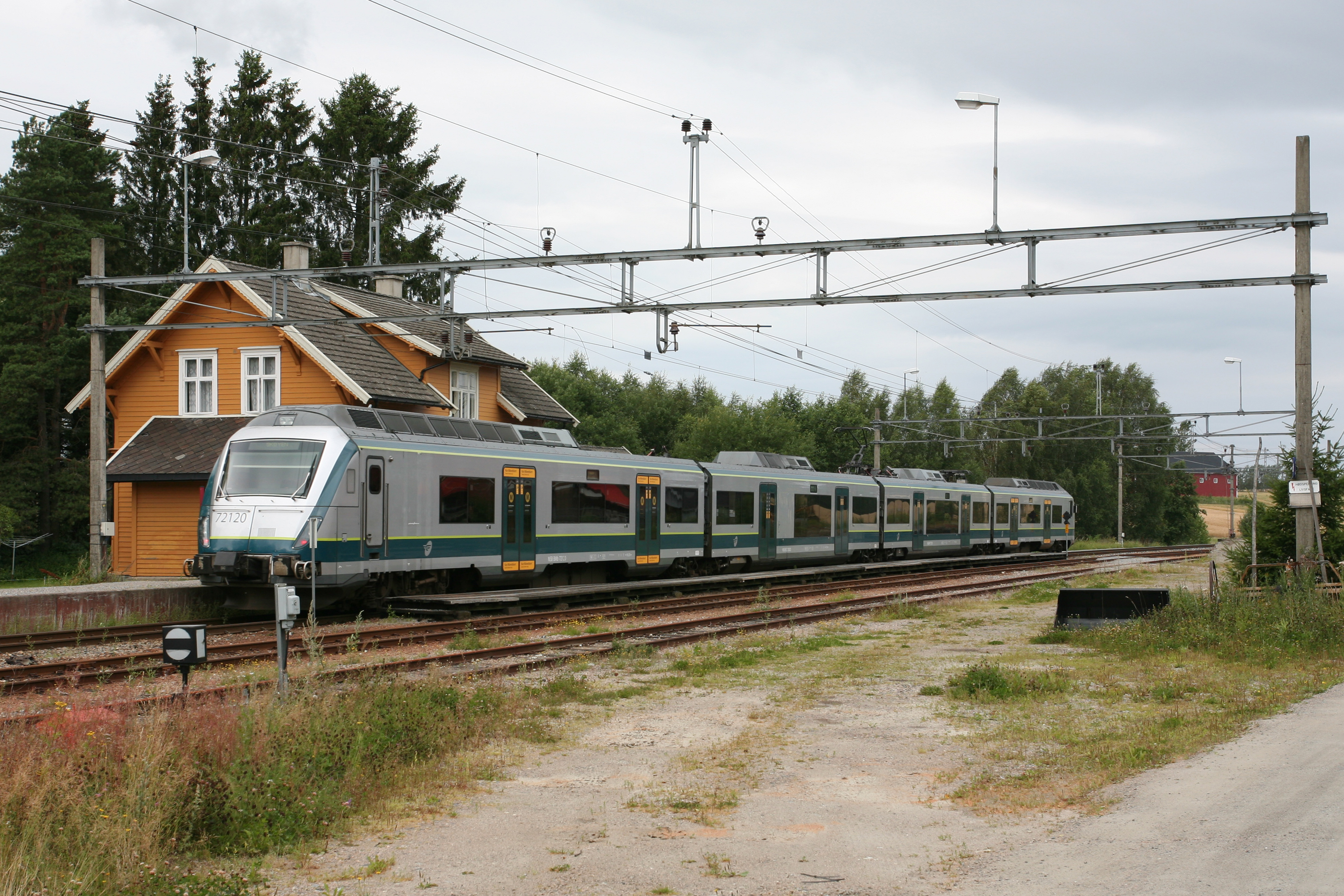
Unit 72.120 at Kråkstad Station

By February 2003, only five of the trains were in operation. Four were being used on the Jæren Commuter Rail, while one was being used on the line between Moss and Spikkestad. A few were still in Italy, a few at the docks in Drammen, while most of the trains were stored at Sundland in Drammen where AnsaldoBreda had employed 40 Italian engineers who worked 60-hour shifts to make the trains work. At the time they were finishing one train per month. By June, all seven trains had been taken into use in Jæren, and the first four trains could be put into service on the route from Kongsberg via the Gardermoen Line to Eidsvoll. In January 2004, rust was found on the axles of the trains. NSB would not accept to take delivery of the last 18 units before this problem had been fixed, and stated that no more money would be paid to the manufacturer until all 36 trains were delivered and without defects. By 2004, Ansaldo and Breda had merged to AnsaldoBreda, while SLM had been bought by Bombardier Transportation. The latter would not deliver the axles to AnsaldoBreda because of a disagreement between Bombardier and SLM's previous owner, Sulzer, regarding who was to pay for the axles. This caused Bombardier to cease all work with the delivery from mid-2003. In October 2004, the trains were put into service on the route between Moss and Spikkestad. Eleven will be operated by Go-Ahead Norge from December 2019.

== Operators ==
Go-Ahead Norge and Vy operates a fleet of 36 trains.

== Specifications ==
Class 72 is a four-car electric multiple unit built by AnsaldoBreda. The trains are 85.570 metres (280.74 ft) long, 3.100 metres (10.17 ft) wide and 4.250 metres (13.94 ft) tall, weigh 157 tonnes (155 long tons; 173 short tons) and run on standard gauge track. The electric power is gathered by a pantograph from a 15 kV 16.7 Hz AC overhead wire, and gives a power output of 2,550 kilowatts (3,420 hp). The trains have a maximum speed of 160 kilometres per hour (99 mph). There are eight doors per side, and a passenger capacity of 310 seated passengers. Each train has one handicap seating place and one toilet.
