= Skeiane Station =

Railway station in Sandnes, Norway

Skeiane Skeiane
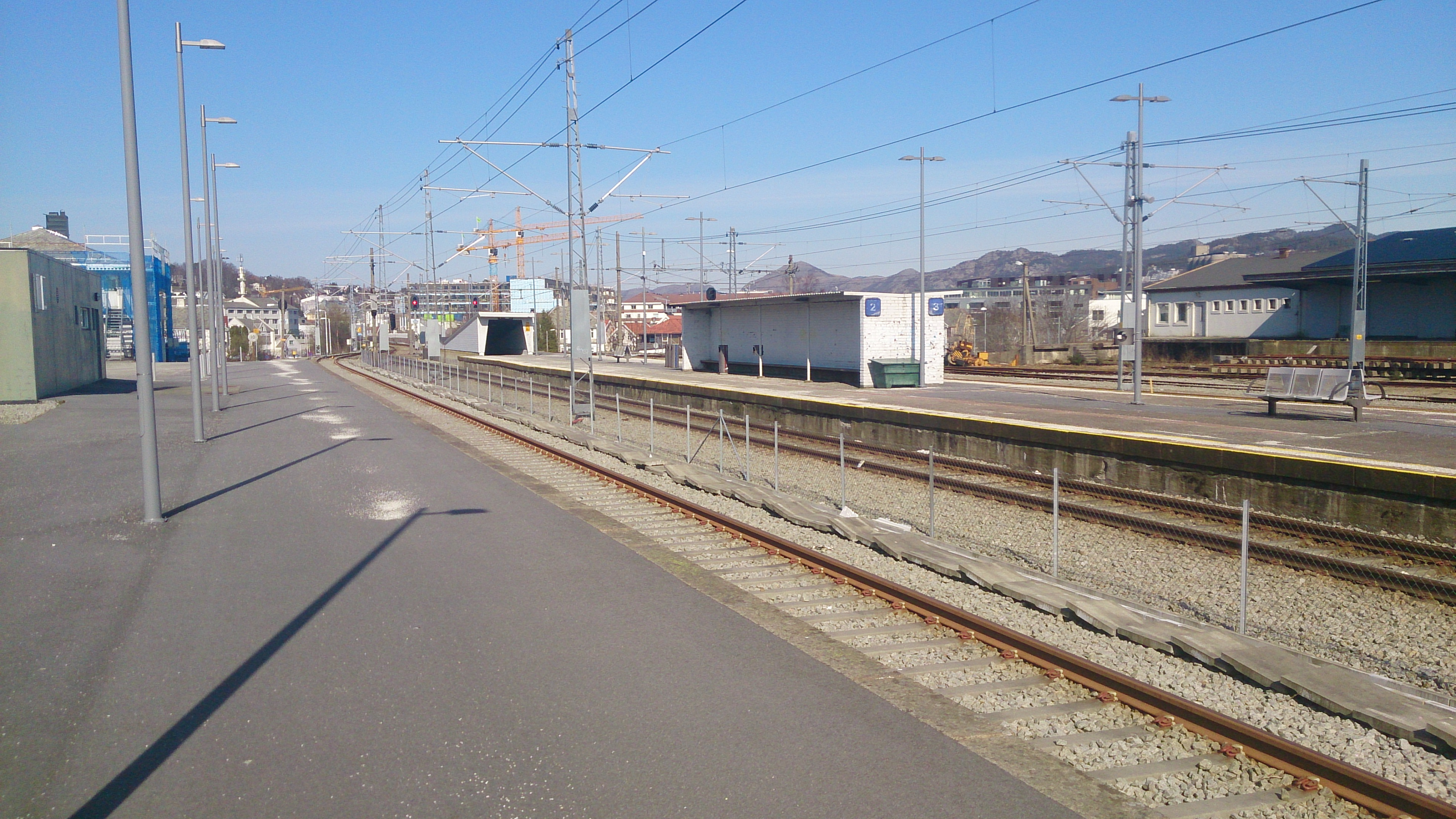

General information
- Location: Skeiene, Sandnes; Norway
- Coordinates: 58°50′51″N 5°43′59″E
- Owner: Bane NOR
- Operator: Go-Ahead Norge
- Line: Sørlandet Line
- Distance: 583.45 km (362.54 mi)
- Platforms: 2
- Connections: Bus: Kolumbus

History
- Opened: 1955
Location

Skeiane Station (Norwegian: Skeiane stasjon) is a railway station in the city of Sandnes which is in the western part of Sandnes Municipality in Rogaland county, Norway. The station is located in the southern part of the city centre, a short distance south of the Sandnes Sentrum Station. The station is 15.36 kilometres (9.54 mi) south of the city of Stavanger. The station has a shelter for waiting, but no food, restroom, or ticketing services.

This station is served by the local Jæren Commuter Rail service running between Stavanger and Egersund on the Sørlandet Line. The station was the central station for Sandnes between 1955 and 1996 (called Sandnes Station), but was then replaced by a rebuilt Sandnes Sentrum Station. This station was then renamed Sandnes holdeplass (from 1996 until 2017), serving only as a stop for local trains, but officially it remained the main station. To reduce confusion with the now much more used station with similar name, the station was renamed to "Skeiane" from 12 August 2017.

| Preceding station | Local trains | Following station |
|---|---|---|
| Sandnes Sentrum towards Stavanger | L5 Jæren Commuter Rail | Ganddal towards Egersund |
