= Frithjof Tidemand-Johannessen =

Norwegian visual artist (1916–1958)

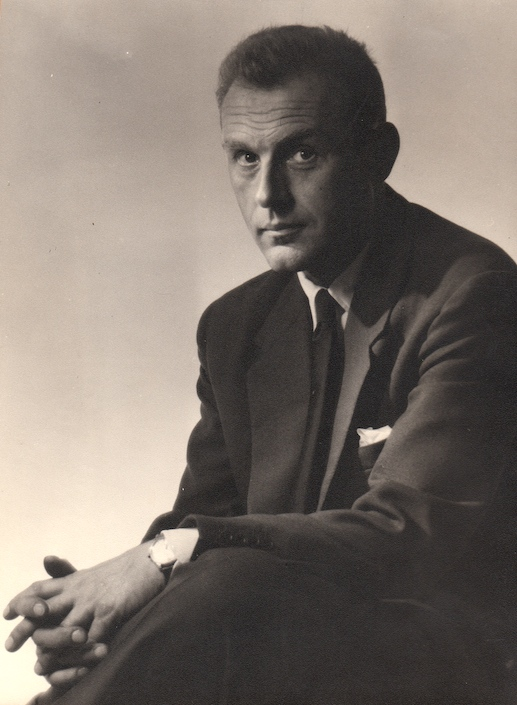
Carl Frithjof Tidemand-Johannessen

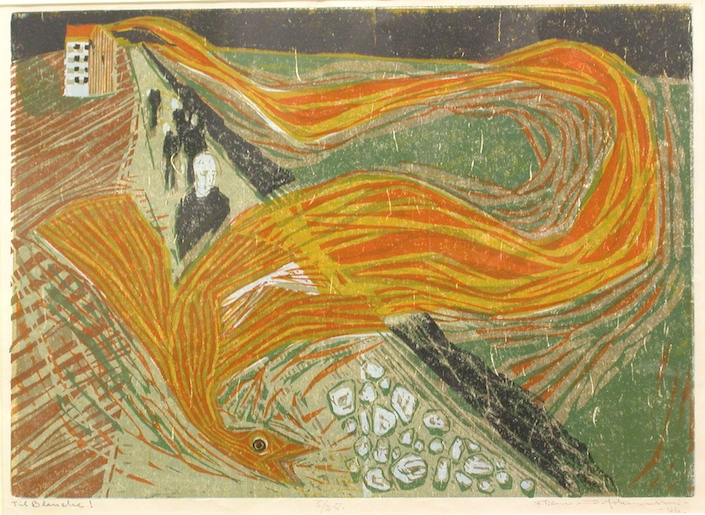
"The Great Release" (1946)

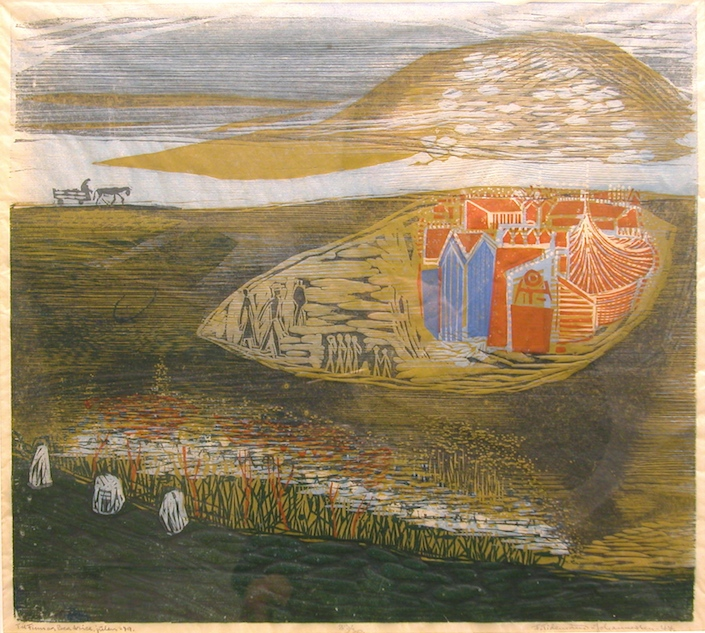
"City of Myth" (1949)

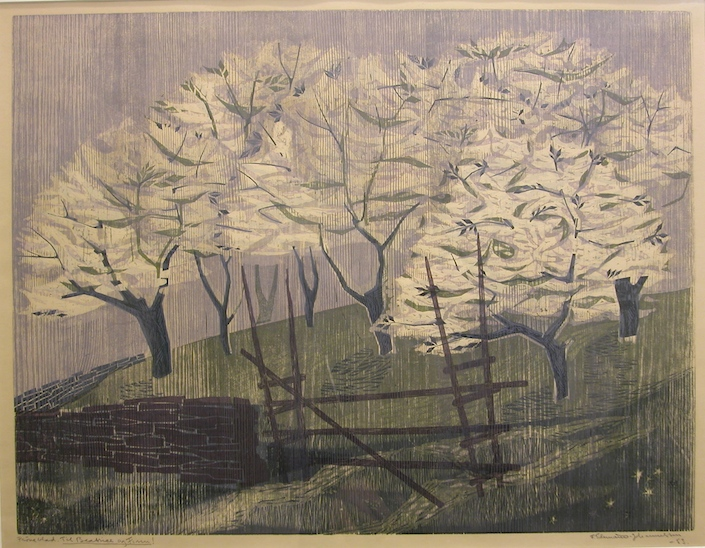
"Apple Orchard in Bloom" (1953)

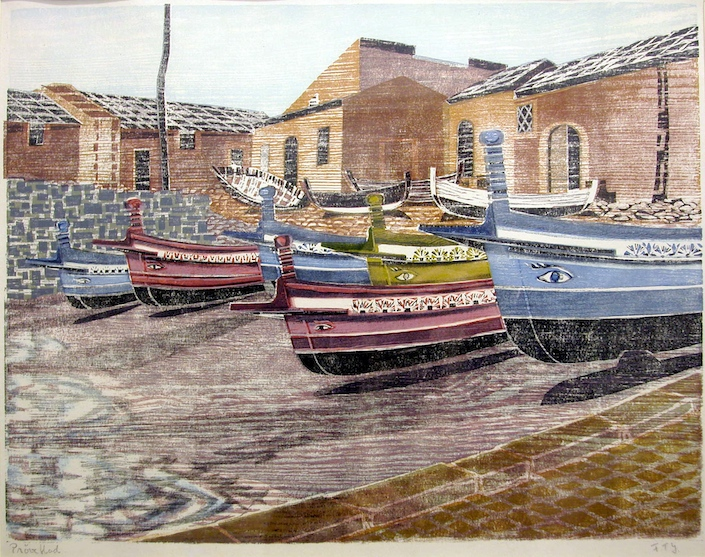
"Fishing boats in Sicily (Avola)" (1956)

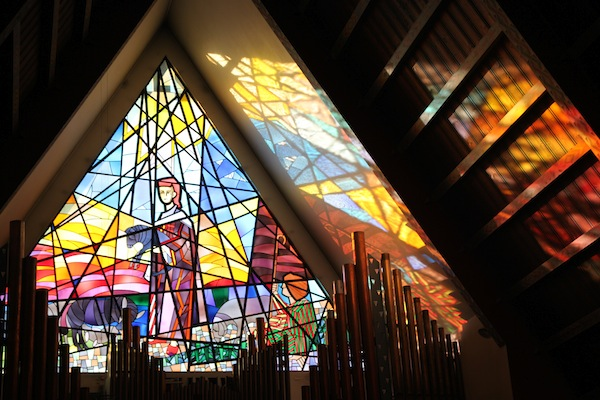
Torshov Church – "The Good Shepherd"

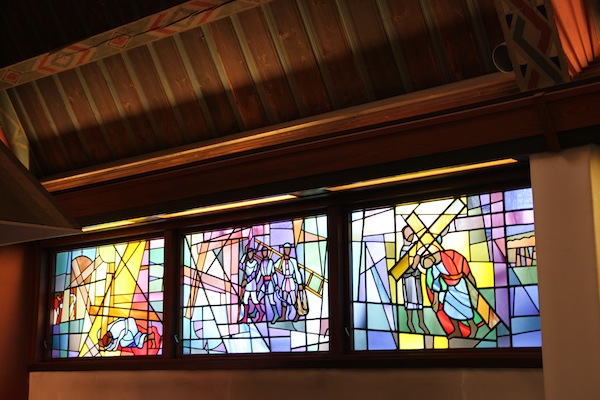
Torshov Church – Glass Mosaics

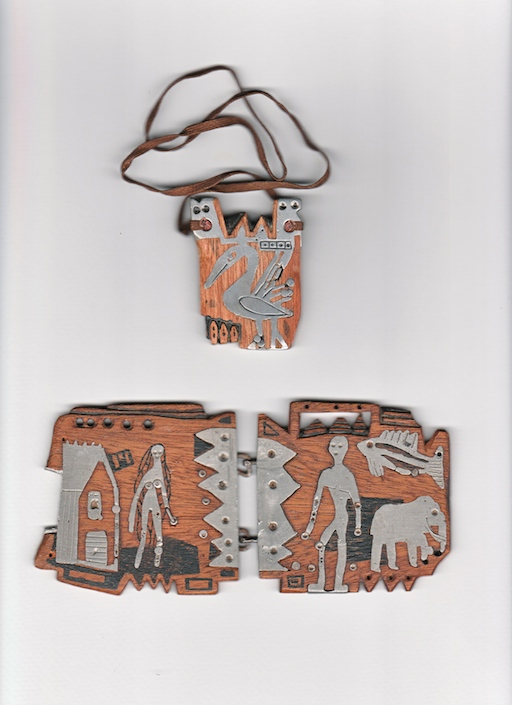
Mahogany inlaid with pewter

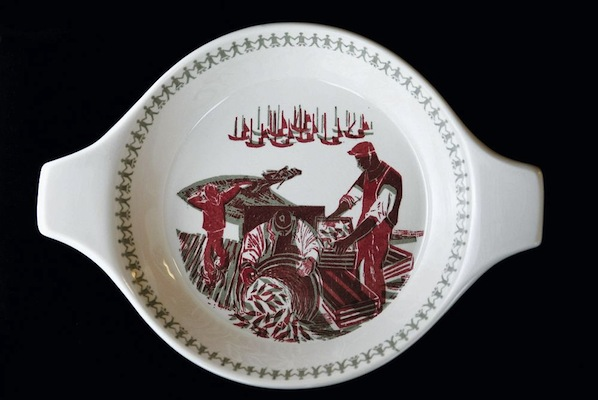
"Samvirkeserien" from Stavangerflint

Carl Frithjof Tidemand-Johannessen (11 September 1916 – 9 October 1958) was a Norwegian designer, illustrator, writer, author, and craftsman. He is best known today for his woodcut prints and for the decorative works on the Torshov Church in Oslo.

== Background ==
Tidemand-Johannessen received his artistic education at the Norwegian National Academy of Craft and Art Industry 1935–37 under Per Krohg, and made his debut at Høstutstillingen in Oslo in 1936. Tidemand-Johannessen then began studies at the Berlin University of the Arts, but was expelled by the Nazi management of the academy after three weeks for allegedly being a "Degenerate artist". After that, he participated in an illegal, underground academy in Berlin for about a year, and made study trips to Austria and Hungary.

During World War II, Tidemand-Johannessen participated in the defense of Norway in 1940, and then in the Norwegian resistance to the German occupation. He was arrested in February 1941 by the Nazi authorities. For a year and a half, between February 1941 and July 1942, he was being moved between the prisons in Åkebergveien and Møllergaten 19. Then, from 9 July 1943 onwards he was imprisoned at Grini concentration camp.

Tidemand-Johannessen was editor-in-chief of the magazine Avant-garden, which was published by the Young Communist League of Norway until the liberation from German occupation in 1945. He continued in this position when the magazine became legal after the war. In the late 1940s he also served as a culture journalist/writer for Friheten, the party's daily newspaper. After the war Tidemand-Johannessen taught for a while at the National Academy of Craft and Art Industry, and played a central role in the idealist-communist circles at the academy up until the Furubotn Purge within the Communist Party of Norway in 1949.

In his time Tidemand-Johannessen became well known, and to some degree controversial, because of his radical ideas about art. In an interview in the Oslo newspaper Verdens Gang in 1953, he argued for erasing the line separating art from the crafts. Tidemand-Johannessen himself printed large, unnumbered editions of woodcuts on a manual book printing press, made possible by innovative techniques involving heat and pressure applied to the specially prepared wood panels. As a result, he could produce graphic art of high technical quality at prices most people could afford.

Tidemand-Johannessen was married to Blanche Aanesen and had two children, of whom the son Kjeld Tidemand-Johannessen also became an artist.

== Graphic Art ==
Tidemand-Johannessen produced most of his graphic art during the years 1946–1958. Much of this work is in the medium of woodcut prints. He is considered to be part of the Norwegian color-woodcut school, along with others like Paul René Gauguin. Tidemand-Johannessen was known for his experimental approach to both process and expression, and his own visual vocabulary evolved to a large extent during his relatively few years as a practicing printmaker.

While his early work has been described as lyrical, his later work is far more stylized and formal. The woodcut To kvinner from 1954 is an example of his later work. It is part of Storebrand's art collection.

The series Norway in 12 Original Color Woodcuts was, in the Norwegian version, published in a large edition by the publishing house Yngvil Forlag in the fall of 1953 and was presented as mass-produced book illustrations, with printed signatures. The series deals with subjects drawn from the country's National Romanticist movement of the nineteenth century, by way of images from different and contrasting regions of Norway, in a rejuvenated design idiom and with specific themes associated with each month of the year. The series was also published in an English version, distributed by Johan Grundt Tanum Bokhandel.

=== Exhibitions ===
Before the war, Tidemand-Johannessen participated in Høstutstillingen in Oslo in 1936, 1937 and 1939. From 1946 he had several solo exhibitions, and was represented in many group shows – in Norway, Europe and Brazil. After his death in 1958 there was a memorial exhibition of his work in Galleri Per in Oslo, where he had shown at several occasions since 1947.

In more recent years, Tidemand-Johannessen has been represented in two group retrospectives: Den norske tresnittskolen (The Norwegian Woodcut School) at the National Gallery of Norway in Oslo from 23 August – 26 October 1997, and Europeisk fargegrafikk fra Ateneums samlinger (European Color Prints from the Ateneum's Collection), Ateneum, Helsinki, from 1 October 2005 – 26 March 2006.

=== Collections ===
Tidemand-Johannessen is represented in the collections of the National Gallery of Norway, with eight prints, as well as in several other Norwegian galleries, both public and private. Outside of Norway, he is represented in the Statens Museum for Kunst, København; Nationalmuseum, Stockholm; Ateneum, Helsinki; Rijksmuseum, Amsterdam; Victoria and Albert Museum, London; Kelvingrove Art Gallery and Museum, Glasgow; Metropolitan Museum, New York.

== Torshov Church ==
Tidemand-Johannessen collaborated with the architect Ulf Nyquist and designed the decorative elements for Torshov Church (Torshov kirke) in Oslo. The church was inaugurated on Whitsunday in 1958, and is considered to be the first modern church building of its kind in Norway. These decorative elements mainly consist of stained glass windows, glass mosaics, and decorative ironwork. At his death, Tidemand-Johannessen had completed three of the twelve stained glass windows. The remainder were completed by Jardar Lunde (1909-1990). The decorative ironwork was executed by the master smith Fred Becker after Tidemand-Johannessen's designs.

== Design ==
Tidemand-Johannessen built, prepared and carved the original wood panels for printing bookbinding designs for a number of books for several publishing houses in Oslo.

He explored other techniques as well, like embedding molten metal in wood objects. In the fall of 1956 Tidemand-Johannessen exhibited a group of work in intarsia at Norway Design in Oslo. These were produced in collaboration with Asta Musedalslien at Norsk Intarsia AS in Tyristrand, after designs by Tidemand-Johannessen. This exhibition received a favorable review from Bonytt, an established Norwegian magazine of arts and interior design.

In the 1950s, Tidemand-Johannessen designed a table-service for Stavangerflint, produced in a limited commemorative edition for Norges Kooperative Landsforening.

== Writings ==
In the first years after the war, Tidemand-Johannessen wrote a short-story collection and two novels, published by Gyldendal Norsk Forlag: Vi syntes ikke det hastet (1945); Prolog over en avdød kjærlighet. Noveller (1946) and Utenfor slentrer folk forbi (1948). He wrote the article "Brakkebyen bygges" for the second volume of Griniboken (The Grini Book – a collection of articles by former camp-prisoners), published by Gyldendal in 1947.

== Literature ==
- Barlaup, Asbjørn: "Trykkpressa like følsom som et klaver", interview with Tidemand-Johannesssen in the Oslo-based newspaper Verdens Gang, 12 December 1953.
- "Frithjof Tidemand-Johannessen død", obituary in Dagbladet, 10 October 1958.
- Egeland, Erik: Øistein Thurman – Trekkfuglen i norsk modernisme, Labyrinth Press 1989, pp. 18–21.
- Flor, Harald: "Linjer i nyere norsk grafikk", in Dag Fyri (ed.): Norske grafikere i dag, Tanum-Norli forlag 1979, pp. 7–32.
- Helliesen, Sidsel: "Fargetresnittskolen", in Norsk grafikk gjennom 100 år, Aschehoug forlag 2000, pp. 169–182.
- Lange, August and Johan Schreiner (ed.): Griniboken bind II, Gyldendal Norsk Forlag 1947, pp. 304–307.
- Nasjonalgalleriet: Norsk kunstnerleksikon, Universitetsforlaget 1986, pp. 261–262.
- Refsum, Tor: "Frithjof Tidemand-Johannessens intarsiaarbeider", in Bonytt 1958, vol. 18, no. 3, pp. 62–63.
- Rude, Rolf: "Fargetresnitt i Galleri Per", article in the Oslo-based newspaper Verdens Gang, 6 May 1947.
- Rude, Rolf: "Fargetresnitt", in Kunsten idag 1947–48, vol. 1, no. 3, pp. 20–29.
- Stenstadvold, Håkon: "Frithjof Tidemand-Johannessen", obituary in the Oslo-based newspaper Aftenposten, 10 October 1958.
- Tidemand-Johannessen, Øistein: Ascendens familien Tidemand-Johannessen, Cammermeyers boghandel 1945, p. 42.
- Verdens Gang: "Frithjof Tidemand-Johannessen er død", obituary in the Oslo-based newspaper Verdens Gang, 10 October 1958.
- Østby, Leif: Ung norsk malerkunst, Mittet & Co forlag 1949, p. 265.
