= Nils Slaatto =

Norwegian architect (1922-2001)

- Born: 22 June 1923; Lillehammer, Norway
- Died: 16 March 2001 (aged 77); Asker, Norway
- Occupation: Architect
- Practice: Lund+Slaatto Arkitekter
- Buildings: Asker Town Hall The Ål cabin Chateau Neuf; St. Hallvard's Church and Monastery; Det Norske Veritas I Det Norske Veritas II

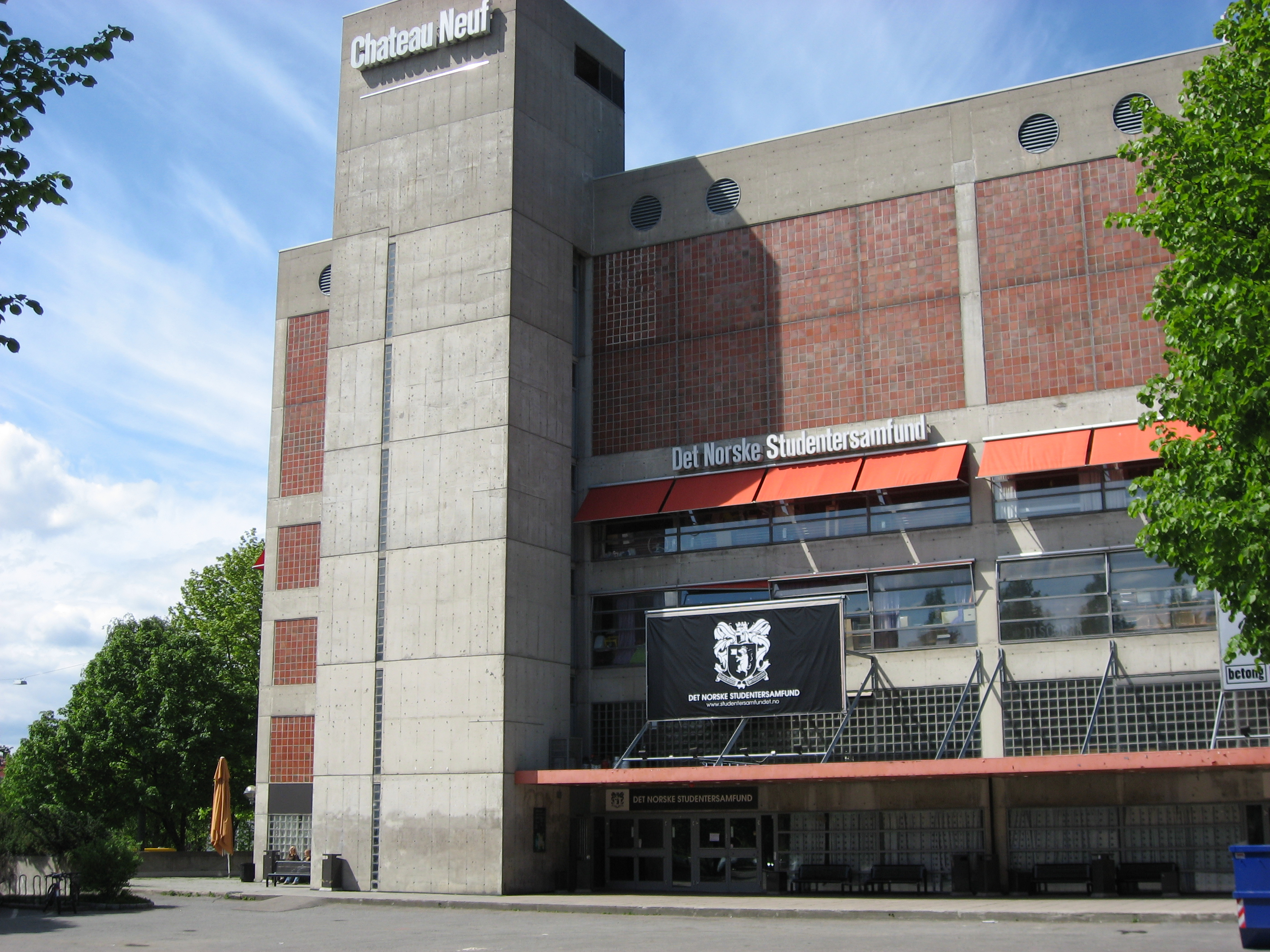
Chateau Neuf

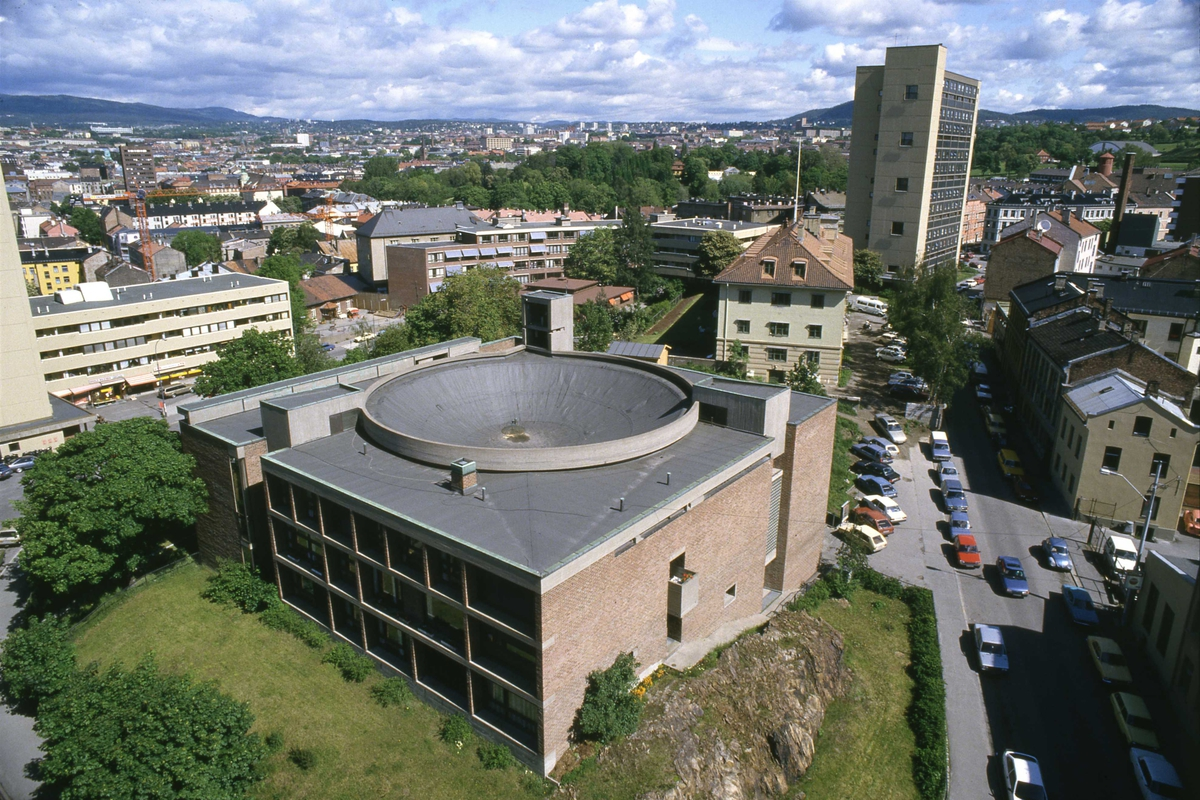
St. Hallvard's Church and Monastery

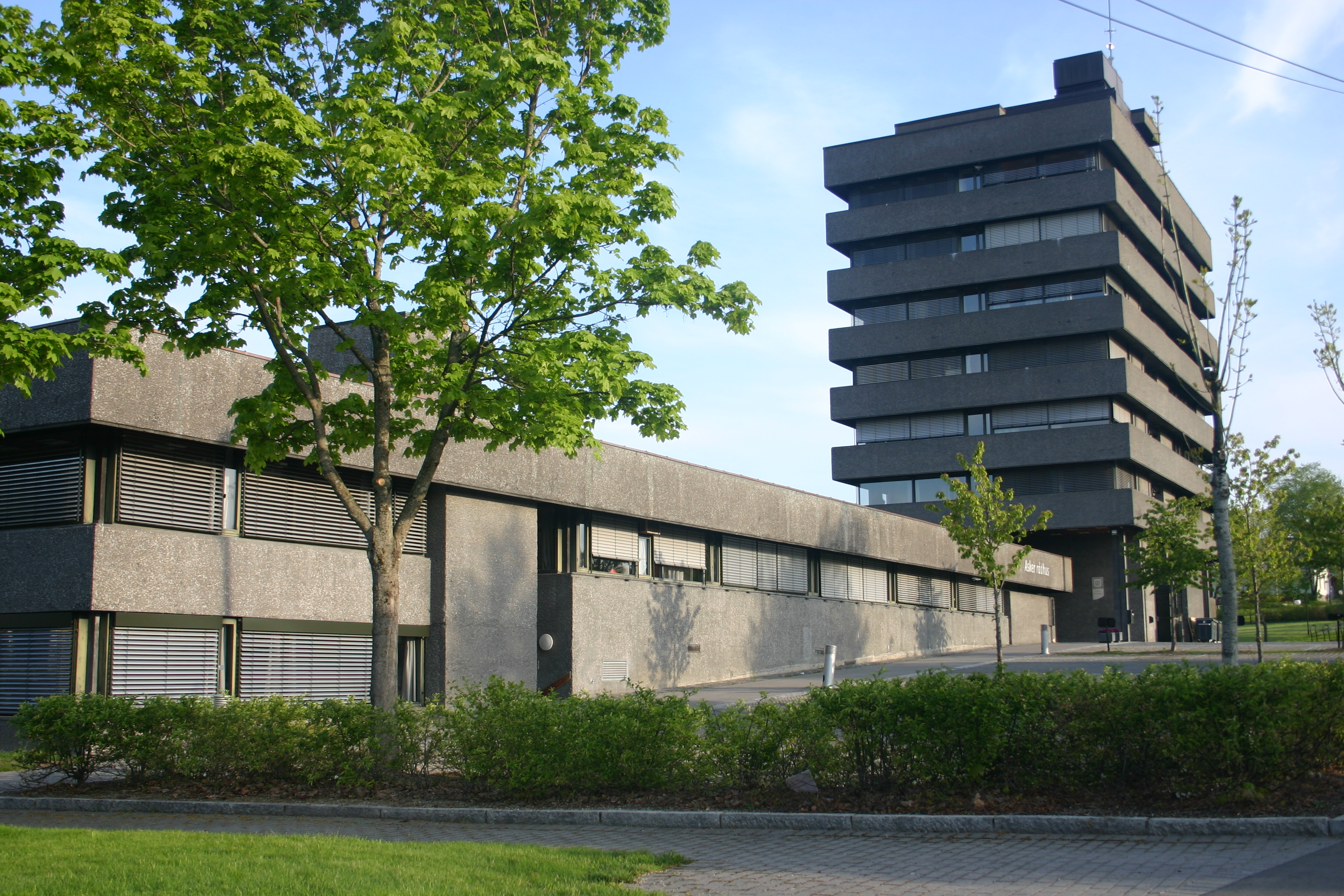
Asker City Hall

Nils Slaatto (22 June 1922 – 16 March 2001) was for more than two decades one of Norway's most prominent and influential architects, having a strong and distinctive impression on Norwegian architecture. Slaatto cooperated with Kjell Lund in an architectural firm partnership for many years.

== Background ==
Nils Slaatto was born in the town of Lillehammer in Oppland county, Norway. His father, Oddmund Eindride Slaatto, was a functionalist architect in Oslo in the years between the two world wars. His mother, Anine Wollebæk, was also an architect, graduating from the University of Technology, but never practised.

During 1938–39, Nils Slaatto took carpentry at the Technical School in Oslo before he enrolled in the Norwegian Institute of Technology, Faculty of Architecture, where he graduated in 1947. The post-war period offered numerous tasks; the most demanding was the rebuilding of northern Norway, where Slaatto participated in the reconstruction of Finnmark as district architect in Vadsø Municipality and Tana Municipality from 1948 to 1950. Large parts of the area suffered major damage during the war because of the Germans' use of the scorched-earth tactic.

== Career ==
In 1957, Nils Slaatto and Kjell Lund, a fellow graduate from the Norwegian Institute of Technology, were invited to take part in a limited competition for an extension to the Akershus County Agricultural College at Hvam. In 1958, after winning the competition, they were able to start their architectural firm Lund & Slaatto Arkitekter AS, a partnership that lasted for three decades. As youngsters, Slaatto and fellow Lillehammer native, Lund, had both wandered around Maihaugen, an open-air museum consisting of many types of old wooden farm buildings They were influenced by this Norwegian wood architecture, adapting age-old techniques to modern production demands. An example is the "Ål cabin" in the Hallingdal Valley, designed in cooperation with Jon Haug.

The architectural firm of Lund & Slaatto was awarded the Houen Foundation Award for three of their designs: St. Hallvard's Church and Monastery at Enerhauggata in Oslo, DNV GL headquarters at Høvik in Bærum, and St. Magnus Catholic Church at Romeriksgata in Lillestrøm.

== Personal life ==
In 1949, Slaatto married Margit Bleken of Trondheim, the sister of the famous Norwegian artist Håkon Bleken. When they moved to Oslo, Slaatto started as the leader of the Farmers' Architectural Office.

== Selected works ==
- 1964 - Asker Town Hall in Akershus
- 1966 - St. Hallvard's Church and Monastery in Oslo
- 1971 - Det Norske Studentersamfund – Chateau Neuf in Oslo
- 1975 – St. Hallvard's Church and Monastery at Enerhauggata in Oslo
- 1988- DNV GL headquarters at Høvik in Bærum Municipality
- 1991 – St. Magnus Catholic Church at Romeriksgata in Lillestrøm

== Achievements ==
- 1962–63 Vice Chairman Oslo Architects' Association
- 1968–70 Vice-president National Federation of Norwegian Architects
- 1965–70 Member of editorial staff Bonytt
- 1968–70 Member of the board of the national Federation of Norwegian Applied Art
- 1965–68 Lecturer at the School of Architecture in Oslo
- 1965–68 Lecturer at the Faculty of Architecture, Norwegian University of Technology
- External examiner, lecturer and consultant for new appointments at the Architectural College
- Member of the jury for Norwegian and Scandinavian architecture competitions
  - 1968 – Pispala district, Tampere, Finland
  - 1980 – Music and Conference Centre, Pori, Finland
  - 1985 – Copenhagen Harbour, Denmark
  - 1988 – U.L.T. Newspaper/Publishing building, Västerås, Sweden

== Sources ==
- Grønvold, Ulf (1988) Lund & Slaatto (Universitetsforlaget (1988) ISBN 82-00-02633-7
- Moe, Ingvild Simers (2006) Eidsvolls plass og Studenterlunden En studie av byrommets funksjonelle, estetiske og symbolske kvaliteter med utgangspunkt i Lund og Slaattos engasjement på 1970- og 80-tallet (Masters Theses in Art History at University of Oslo)
