= Feyling =

Feyling is a Norwegian surname. Notable people with the surname include:

- Claus Egil Feyling (1916–1989), Norwegian politician
- Sigmund Feyling (1895–1980), Norwegian priest
- Thorbjørn Feyling (1907–1985), Norwegian ceramist
