= Kari Nyquist =

Norwegian artist

Kari Nyquist (October 17, 1918 – April 20, 2011) was a Norwegian ceramist. She is most associated with her decorated ceramics from the Stavangerflint AS plant in Stavanger, Norway. Her designs are most often found pottery of blue clay or stoneware.

== Biography ==
Nyquist was born in Oslo, Norway. She was educated as a ceramist at the Norwegian National Academy of Craft and Art Industry in Oslo between 1934 and 1938. She trained at the ceramic workshops of artisans including Eilif Whist and William Knutzen and was employed at Åros Keramikk and Schneider & Knutzen AS. She established her own ceramic workshop in Oslo in 1942.

== Designer at Stavangerflint AS ==
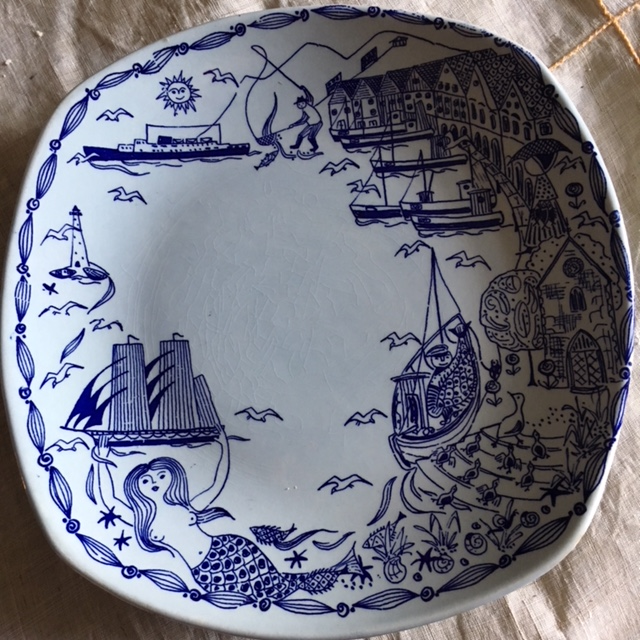
Example of design by Kari Nyquist.

From 1955 Nyquist was employed as a freelance artist and designer at Stavangerflint AS, Stavanger, Norway. She worked at the earthenware company for short intervals and created designs for ceramic tableware, children’s tableware, occasional objects and souvenirs. Her drawings were reproduced as silk screens, most often in a blue colour on a light blue background, but they are also found in other colour variations.

== Recognitions ==
A tea set from the mid-1950s with her decorations on the model Utstein designed by Norwegian ceramic and glass designer Eystein Sandnes is represented at the Victoria and Albert Museum in London. Kari Nyquist has held several exhibitions in Norway and abroad. She has pieces represented at The National Museum of Art, Architecture and Design in Oslo.

== Other sources ==
- Gjerde, Jan (2007) Glimt Fra Stavangerflints Historie (Stavanger: Stavangerflint AS) ISBN 978-82-303-0998-8
- Olsen, Astrid and Rolf Simeon Andersen (2000) Moderne Antikviteter: Norsk Keramikk, Signaturer Og Merker 1900-1960 (Oslo: Lunde) ISBN 82-520-3279-6
- Gjerde, Jan Fra Kvaleberg til cyberspace (Stavanger: Stavangerflint AS) ISBN 978-82-303-0998-8
