= Ålgård Line =

Railway line in Rogaland, Norway

Coordinates: 58°47′38″N 5°47′7″E

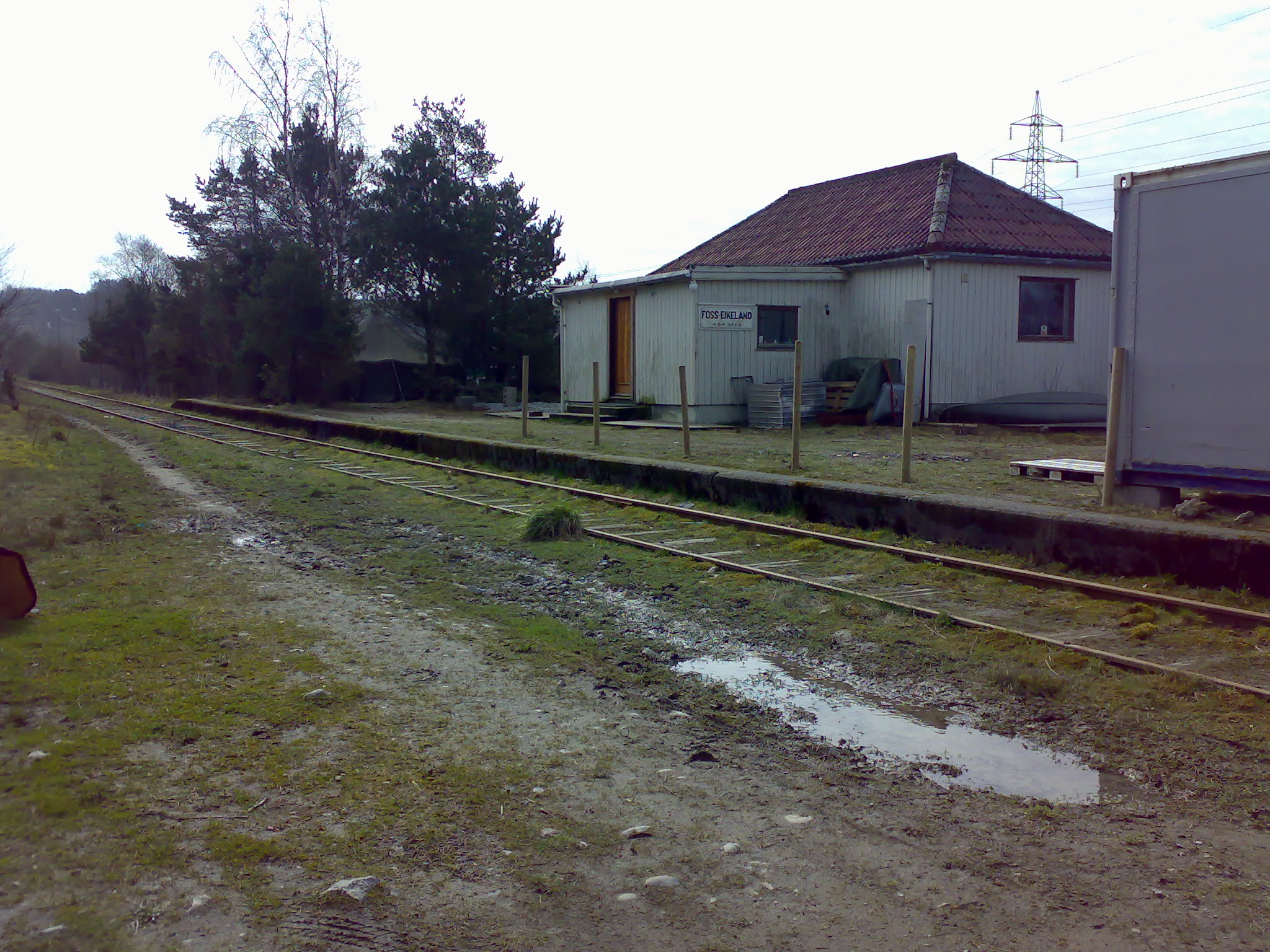
- Foss-Eikeland

Overview
- Native name: Ålgårdbanen
- Status: Closed
- Owner: Norwegian National Rail Administration
- Termini: Ganddal Station; Ålgård Station
- Stations: 10

Service
- Type: Railway
- System: Norwegian railway

History
- Opened: 20 December 1924
- Closed: 2001

Technical
- Line length: 12.24 km (7.61 mi)
- Number of tracks: Single
- Track gauge: 1,435 mm (4 ft 8 1/2 in)
- Old gauge: 1,067 mm (3 ft 6 in)
- Highest elevation: 94 m (308.4 ft) AMSL

The Ålgård Line (Norwegian: Ålgårdbanen) is a closed, but not abandoned, railway line between Ganddal and Ålgård in Rogaland, Norway. The 12.24-kilometer (7.61 mi) line was built as a narrow gauge branch line of the Jæren Line by the Norwegian State Railways (NSB) and opened in 1924. It runs through the villages of Foss-Eikeland and Figgjo in Sandnes Municipality to Ålgård in Gjesdal Municipality. Several proposals were made for the Ålgård Line to become the first part of the main line from Stavanger to Oslo, but instead the Sørlandet Line was connected to the Jæren Line in 1944. At the same time, the Ålgård Line was upgraded to standard gauge.

The line had up to ten daily round trips with diesel multiple units, until passenger traffic was terminated in 1955. Freight traffic remained until 1988, when most of the line was abandoned in 1988, although 3 kilometers (2 mi) was used until 2001. The line is owned by the Norwegian National Rail Administration. The station at Figgjo has been converted to a museum, and the 3-kilometer (2 mi) section from there to Ålgård is used for recreational draisines. There have been proposals to reopen the line either as part of the Jæren Commuter Rail or the planned light rail for Greater Stavanger.

== Route ==
Map of the Jæren Line and the Ålgård Line

The Ålgård Line runs 12.24 kilometers (7.61 mi) from Ganddal to Ålgård. The whole line was built with NSB's standard for main lines, with a maximum gradient of 1.5 percent and minimum curve radius of 300 meters (980 ft). It branches off from the Sørlandet Line (previously the Jæren Line) north of Ganddal Station, 18 kilometers (11 mi) south of Stavanger. When the line opened, Ganddal Station was located south of the creek Stokkelandselven, but it was moved further north in 1935 to simplify operations. The line continues over Stokkelandsevlen on a 7.5-meter-long (25 ft) bridge, and follows the creek until it reaches Foss-Eikeland, 3.43 kilometers (2.13 mi) from Ganddal. Foss-Eikeland had a 91-meter-long (299 ft) passing loop and a 40-meter-long (130 ft) platform. The station building was built in wood, had a single story and was 57 square meters (610 sq ft).

After Foss-Eikeland, the line crosses Figgjo River on a 30-meter-long (98 ft) truss bridge. It passes Bråstein Station and continues up the steepest gradient at 1.5 percent to Figgjo Station. It had a 69-meter (226 ft) passing loop and a 50-meter-long (160 ft) platform, and a 97-square-meter (1,040 sq ft) single-story station building in wood. Ålgård Station was the largest on the line, with two tracks and a 120-meter-long (390 ft) platform, a 12.3-meter-long (40 ft) turntable and a 66-square-meter (710 sq ft) depot. The station was built in wood in two stories, and included living quarters for the station master.

The line is, along with the Namsos Line, the only railway line in Norway to holistically employ Neoclassical architecture. All the original stations were designed by R. Werenskiold, who used a simplistic, wooden interpretation of the 1920s Neoclassicism. The station buildings at Figgjo and Ålgård have been preserved by the Norwegian Directorate for Cultural Heritage. The line eventually received additional stops, and in 1955, there were stations at Holane, Vagle, Foss-Eikeland, Kalberg, Bråstein, Figgjo Fajanse, Figgjo, Figgjo fabrikker and Ålgård. Some trains operated to Sandnes Station, whilst others continued all the way to Stavanger Station.

As of 1994, the line was intact and operational from Ganddal to Foss-Eigeland and the cement factory there. Here, an internal crane track has been welded across the line. From Foss-Eigeland to Figgjo, the track is intact. At Figgjo, a bridge has been demolished, and it is not possible to traverse that section. Except for a number of level crossings where the tracks have been asphalted over, the line remains intact to Ålgård. At Ålgård Station the tracks have been removed, but the station building and depot remains. The station at Foss-Eigeland has been converted to a church, while the station at Figgjo had been taken over by a wholesaler. The line has officially been closed, but has not been abandoned. The Norwegian National Rail Administration retains ownership and can in the future renovate the line for operation.

== History ==
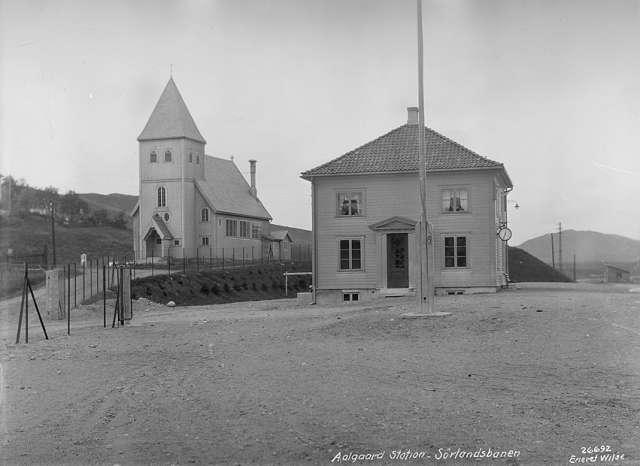
Ålgård Station in 1924

The first plans to build a railway line along the route of the Ålgård Line was as part of the main route between Stavanger and Oslo. In 1873, County Engineer Th. Sejersted proposed a line running through Høgsfjord, Dirdal, Hunnedalen, Sirdal and Hylestad and onwards through Telemark to Kongsberg. Through Rogaland, it would run further east than the Jæren Line, which was under construction from Stavanger to Egersund. When the plans for a Sørlandet Line—which would connect Stavanger to Oslo via Kristiansand—started to be developed in 1892, some of Sjersted's plans were reconsidered.

On 27 September 1894, a committee was established to plan a branch from the Jæren Line to Ålgård. The following year, the committee recommended that a line be built branching from Orstad in Klepp Municipality, which would cost 348,000 Norwegian krone (NOK). Gjesdal Municipality offered NOK 60,000 of the capital, on the condition that NSB would build and operate it. The state, on the other hand, wanted the line to be private. Private railways were often largely or entirely owned by municipalities, counties and the state, but would operate independently of NSB, and the municipalities would carry the risk for operating deficits.

A new committee was established in 1910, led by Mayor Sven Nilssen of Gjesdal, who was also director at Ålgårds Ullvarefabrikker. His company paid for traffic counting along the route, and the committee concluded that there was sufficient traffic to build a line. Two routes were proposed: one branching from Sandnes Station and one from Ganddal Station. The Ganddal alternative had lower investment costs, but would give higher operating costs; in 1913, investments were stipulated at NOK 787,800. Although NSB's board supported the line, construction was placed on hold.

In 1919, local politicians proposed that the line be built administratively as part of the Jæren Line, but this was rejected by the government. Instead, the ministry wanted to again consider the Ålgård Line as part of the Sørlandet Line, and proposed that the Ålgård Line be built with standard gauge—which would be used for the Sørlandet Line—instead of the narrow gauge used by the Jæren Line. However, there would be no need for standard gauge until the Sørlandet Line was extended to Rogaland, so the line was planned to be built with narrow gauge track, but all other installations would be prepared for standard gauge.

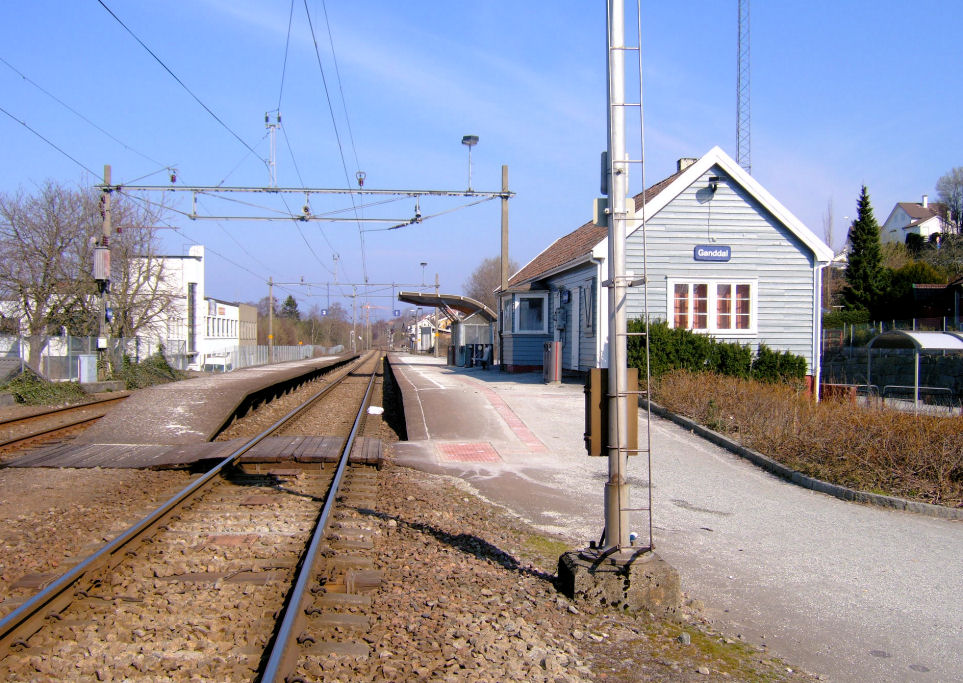
Ganddal Station, where the Ålgård Line branches off from the Sørland Line

Siting of the Ålgård Line from Ganddal to Ålgård started in 1920. The final cost estimate was NOK 2.82 million and the plan was passed by Parliament on 20 July 1921, with construction commencing on 21 December. The construction was organized by Just Broch and led by Olaf Bakke. Between 200 and 250 people worked on the line during construction. Because of the recession, the railway works were seen as way to create jobs. Most of the workers came from Stavanger and nearly all had families to support. The first train to operate on the line went from Stavanger on 20 December 1924, with the official opening by Minister of Labour Lars Oftedal taking place when it reached Ålgård. The line became the last state-owned railway in Norway to be opened with narrow gauge.

At the start, there were one or two daily round trips with steam locomotive-hauled trains. In the first year of operation, the line transported 18,500 passengers. The initial ticket price from Sandnes to Ålgård was NOK 1.50, compared to NOK 1 for a bus ticket. This was in part because NSB operated with a standard price based on the length of the line, and the line was longer than the corresponding roads. After a while NSB's board accepted that tickets be priced as if they were the length of the road, and the price was reduced to NOK 1.10. Because of competition from truck drivers picking up random passengers for NOK 0.75, the price was then reduced to NOK 0.80 in 1927. The line made a profit during until the late 1940s, after which it started to operate with a deficit. In the financial year 1948–49, the line transported 79,700 passengers.

In 1923, Parliament voted for a plan for the Sørlandet Line to run via Bjerkreim instead of the city of Egersund, and then onwards via Gjesdal. This plan meant that the section from Ganddal to Stavanger would have dual gauge. During further planning, it became clear that the Gjesdal alternative, although 15 kilometers (9 mi) shorter, had a greater elevation difference than that needed for connecting the Sørlandet Line to the Jæren Line. This changed the NSB board's and Rogaland County Council's opinion, and the Jæren alternative was chosen. The final decision to build via Jæren was made by parliament in 1937.

An inter-municipal railway committee was established in 1941. Led by Sigval Bergesen, it considered the possibility of extending the Ålgård Line towards Hunnedalen via Setesdalsheiene to Lunde in Telemark. The line would be built with a higher standard than the Sørlandet Line and have a shorter route, allowing travel time from Stavanger to Oslo to be reduced to four to five hours. A detailed plan was made for the extension from Ålgård to the county border with Telemark. To consider the proposal, parliament established a committee in 1949 to look at the various proposals. After considering the impact and value of the various railways that had been proposed in the 1940s, it recommended not building the Inner Trunk Line, as the expansion had been christened.

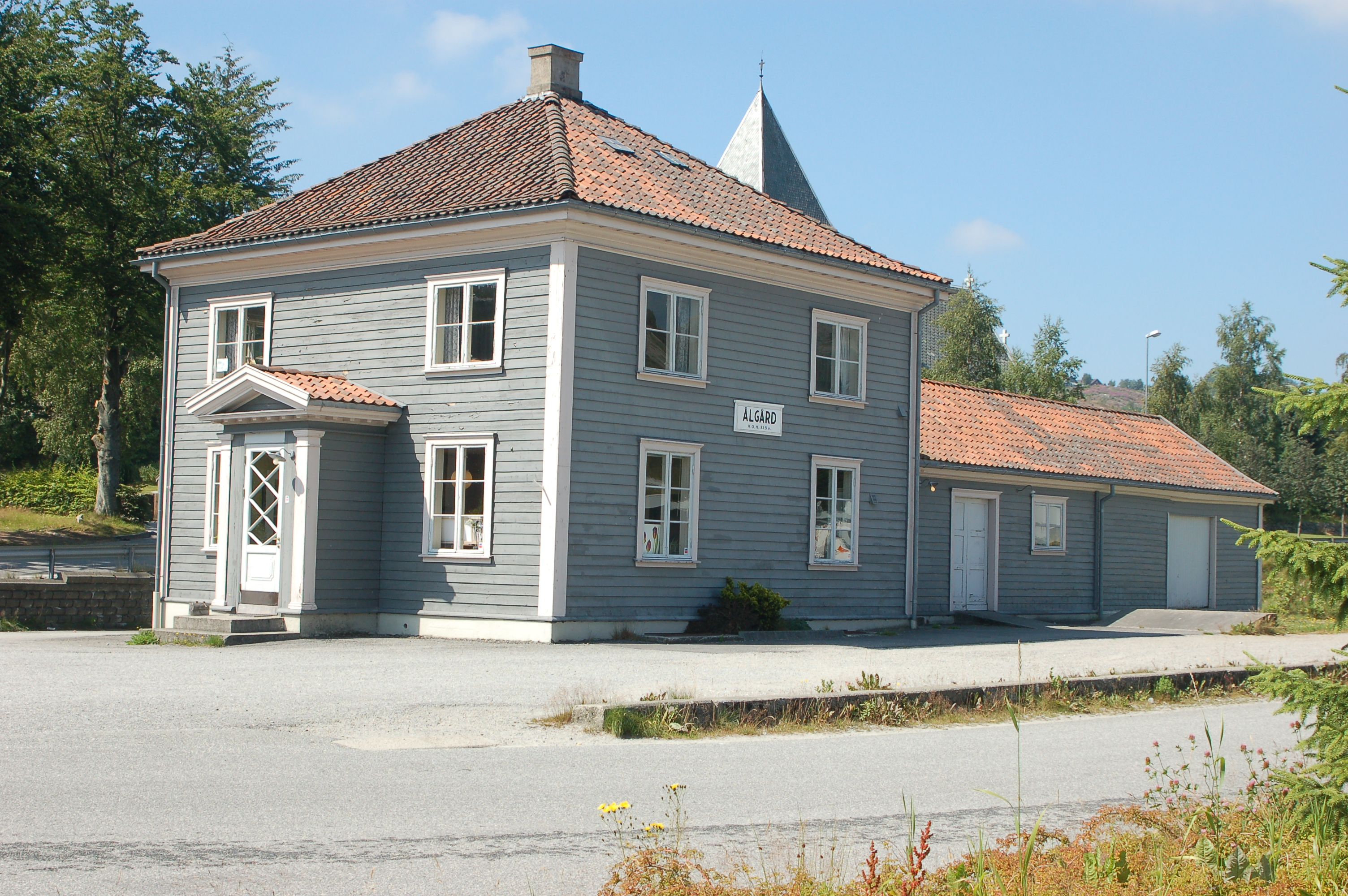
Ålgård Station, the terminus

In 1930, an NSB Class Cmb1 diesel multiple unit was taken into use, and the number of daily trips increased to four. On days with heavy traffic, it hauled a trailer, which was normally stationed at Sandnes Station. On 10 November 1935, the new Ganddal Station opened, simplifying the stopping at the station. During World War II, the multiple units were disused, and instead the trains were hauled with steam locomotives. From 1 May 1944, the line was converted to standard gauge, and NSB Class 14 multiple units were taken into use, running on wood gas until the end of the war. In 1945, there were four daily round trips, but at the start of 1946, the number of daily round trips increased to six, and from mid-1946, to ten. From 1947 to 1953, there were eight or nine daily round trips, and from 1953 ten. Class 14 was eventually replaced with NSB Class 86 and NSB Class 87 in 1953. By then, the driving time from Ålgård to Sandnes had been reduced from 38 to 25 minutes.

In the 1940s and 1950s, several companies started a competing bus service. There were accusations that the route was cross-subsidized and that price dumping was occurring along the route from Sandnes to Ålgård. In the early 1950s, discussion started about closing the line, and on 1 November 1955, all passenger transport was terminated, after a decision in parliament on 26 May 1955. This is the line with the most frequent passenger traffic in Norway to have been closed.

After it was decided that passenger transport on the railway was to be terminated, both NSB's bus division and other private companies, particularly Sverre Hage, wanted to have the concession to operate the line. Both established a bus services with a frequency as if the other operator did not exist. At the peak of the conflict, NSB's operations were at one point stopped by the police, although in the end, the concession was granted to them. As a response, Haga applied for concession to operate passenger transport on the railway, but this was denied by the authorities. The transfer to bus operations increased the ticket prices and travel time.

Freight trains to the various industrial companies along the line remained until the 1980s, when traffic sank drastically. From 1988, the line was closed from Foss-Eigeland, although the line from there to Ganddal was kept for use for a cement factory. Until 2001 only the three first kilometers (two first miles) of the line were used, for transport of concrete structures, but then the Norwegian National Rail Administration stopped all traffic on the line.

== Heritage ==
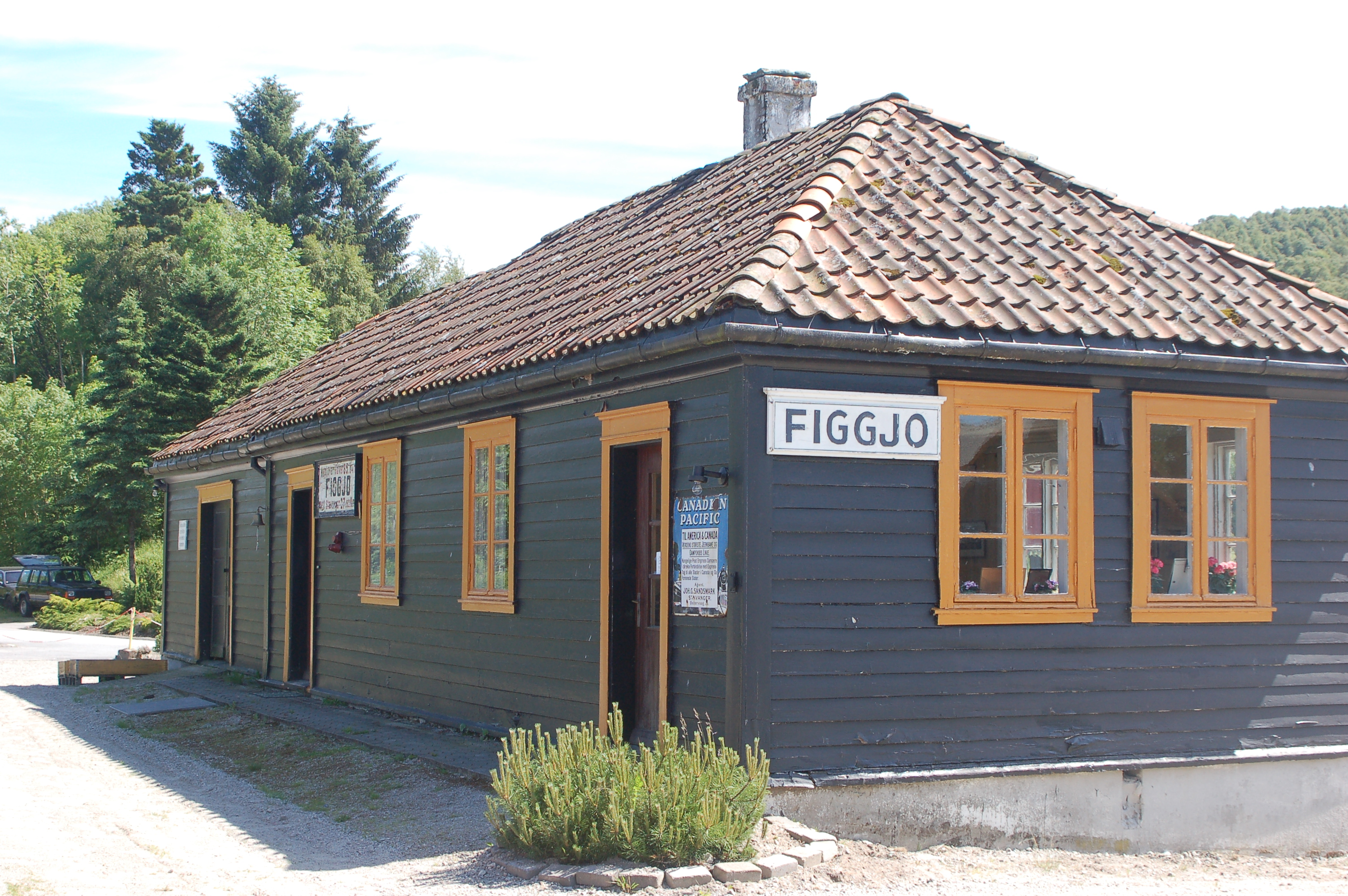
Figgjo Station has been transformed into a museum about the line.

The non-profit organization Friends of the Ålgård Line (Ålgårdbanens venner) have preserved 3 kilometers (2 mi) of the line and Figgjo Station. The station has been converted to a museum, while the railway between Figgjo and Ålgård is used for renting out draisines. At Figgjo, there is a railway car and a shunter on display.

== Future ==
Several local politicians have proposed re-opening the line and either making it part of the Jæren Commuter Rail or part of the planned light rail in Greater Stavanger. Additionally, the Norwegian National Rail Administration has supported a future re-opening of the line. Estimates show that the line has a traffic potential for 600,000 passengers per year. In a proposal from the National Rail Administration, the Ålgård Line is seen as a possible branch of the commuter rail, with stations at Vagle, Figgjo, Kongeparken and Ålgård. Without making any investments to the Sørlandet Line, it would be possible to extend the two hourly services that terminate at Sandnes to Ålgård. Ålgård is also a good location for a park and ride for European Route E39. However, the Ålgård Line would need a full upgrade, including new tracks, electric system and signaling. This would give a travel time from Ganddal to Ålgård of 10 to 12 minutes. The estimated cost of re-opening the line is NOK 500 million. The Center Party has proposed converting the line to a bus lane. The borough council of Figgjo has voted to convert the line to a bicycle path, but this has been rejected by the National Rail Administration.

== See also ==
- List of gauge conversions
- Narrow gauge railways in Norway
