= Lofthus =

Lofthus may refer to:

== Places ==
- Lofthus, Vestland, a village in Ullensvang municipality in Vestland county, Norway
- Lofthus, Oslo, a borough in the city of Oslo in Norway

== People ==
- Anne Lofthus, a Norwegian ceramic artist and art teacher
- Christian Jensen Lofthuus, a prominent farmer from Risør, Norway
- Hege Lofthus, the former president of EGTYF (European Good Templar Youth Federation)
- Herbrand Lofthus, a Norwegian wrestler who competed in the Olympics
- Torstein Lofthus, a Norwegian drummer and composer

== Other ==
- Lofthus (shipwreck), a Norwegian shipwreck (which sank in 1898) near Boynton Beach, Florida, United States
