= Gro Pedersen Claussen =

Norwegian designer

Gro Pedersen Claussen (born 1 October 1941) is a Norwegian graphic designer at the earthenware factory Stavangerflint AS in Stavanger, Norway, (1963–1967) and textile designer at Sandvika Veveri, Bærum, Norway (1977–2004). Her many designs on ceramic objects like "Per Spelemann", "Ut etter øl" and "Venner" are sought after by collectors of industrial ceramic objects from Norway.

== Biography ==
Gro Pedersen Claussen was born in Stavanger, Norway . She was educated as a graphic designer at the Stavanger Technical College (1958–1961). Previously she had taken courses in drawing at The Stavanger Drawing School. Later on she also took lessons at an art school in ceramics. From 1963 to 1967 she was employed as a designer at the earthenware factory Stavangerflint AS, Hillevåg, Norway. She moved to the eastern part of Norway in 1967 but continued to create designs for Stavangerflint on a freelance basis to 1975. From 1977 Gro Pedersen Claussen worked as a textile designer for Sandvika Veveri in Bærum, Norway. She resigned in 2006 after 29 years of duty for the company.

== The designer ==
Her most famous designs for Stavangerflint AS are those for the gift and collector items “Per Spelemann” and “Ut etter øl”, based on traditional Norwegian songs. She also created the design for the children's sets ”Bæ, bæ, lille lam” and ”Venner”. She created the design for the tea, dinner and breakfast tableware on forms made by the company's design director, Kåre Berven Fjeldsaa. In addition, she created a large number of souvenir objects with motifs from Norway and abroad.

At Sandvika Veveri she made designs that were printed on fabrics such as jute, linen and cotton. The source material for patterns constituted the largest part of the production. The fabrics were usually not credited the artists, but many of Gro Pedersen Claussens designs are known through printed promotional material and coverage in periodicals and newspapers. In 1992, in close cooperation with the Directorate for Cultural Heritage in Norway, she designed the carpet for the reception hall at the Eidsvoll Building in Eidsvoll where the Norwegian Constitution was agreed on in 1814.

== The artist ==
Gro Pedersen Clausen also expressed herself as a painter and ceramist. She has had several exhibitions of her work and also joined group exhibitions in Stavanger and the Oslo area.

== Sources ==
Stavangerflints archives at Figgjo AS,

Various media coverage,

Jan Gjerde: Gro Pedersen Claussen, http://gratisnettside.no/stavangerflinthistorie/?&mid=572 ,

”Fra Kvaleberg til cyberspace”, ISBN 978-82-303-0998-8,

Gro Pederesen Claussen's private archive.
