= Stavangerflint =

Norwegian earthenware factory

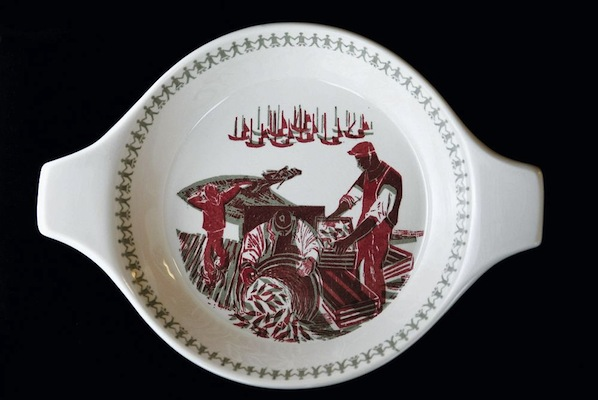
"Samvirkererien" designed by Frithjof Tidemand-Johannessen

Stavangerflint AS was an earthenware factory that was in operation from 1949 until 1979 in Stavanger, Norway.

== Company history ==
Production of pottery tableware for households and for the professional market started in 1949 under the name of Stavanger Fajansefabrikk A/S . The initiators, Trygve Brekke (1908–1994) and Trygve Pedersen (1887-1969) took as their starting point the market conditions and needs resulting from inter-war imports of ceramic tableware, the war and post-war shortage of goods, and expectations for a growing domestic demand as the country gradually recovered, and as retail purchasing power grew. Stavanger Fajansefabrikk aimed from the start for a clay mixture and manufacturing process which was to be marketed as Stavangerflint, based on a recipe developed by Josiah Wedgwood in England around 1750. This was a marketable name which had the aim of presenting the factory's products as strong and durable earthenware.

On 16 April 1952 Stavanger Fajansefabrikk A.S. changed its name to Stavangerflint AS. By adding the word flint to the company name, the quality angle of the products would be enhanced. In 1968 Stavangerflint AS merged with its competitor Figgjo Fajanse AS. Stavangerflint continued as a branch of Figgjo Fajanse - Stavangerflint AS. Thirty years after Stavangerflint had started production and quickly developed into a showcase manufacturing plant, it was closed down. In 1979 the properties in Stavanger were sold. All production was transferred to Figgjo and the business changed its name from Figgjo Fajanse – Stavangerflint A/S to Figgjo AS.

== Management and Artistic Directors ==
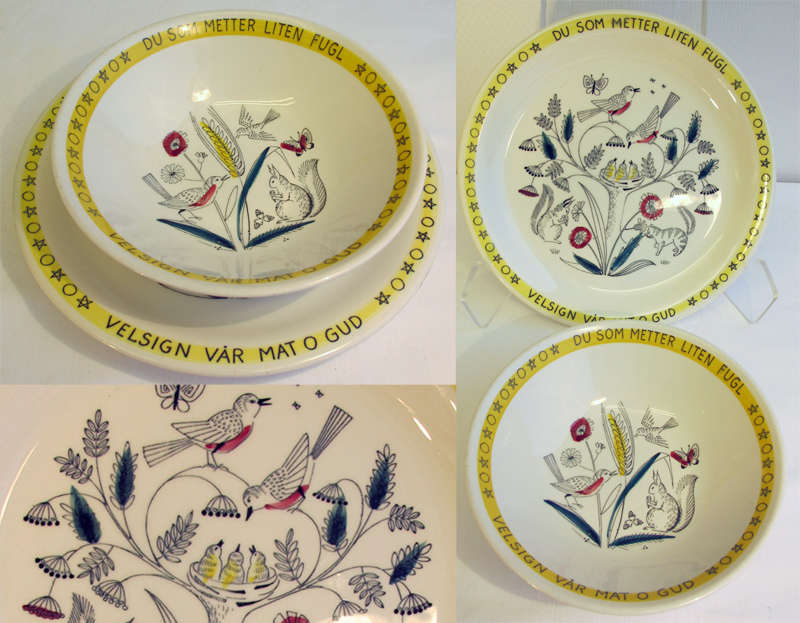
Children's breakfast plate and bowl designed by Anne Lofthus

During its 19 years as an independent company, Stavangerflint had three artistic directors: Thorbjørn Feyling (1949-1955), Eystein Sandnes (1955-1957) and Kåre Berven Fjeldsaa (1958-1968). In 1963 Sigurd Jensen (1919-2000) succeeded Trygve Brekke as managing director. Sigurd Jensen had been Commercial Director and second in command at Stavangerflint from the start. Jensen was to play an important role as the driving force in the processes which led to the amalgamation of Stavangerflint AS and Figgjo Fajanse AS. The new company continued production at the old premises as two branches and the goods had their old markings which were identical to the original factory names.

== Artists ==
An important source for information about what was produced in the potteries in Rogaland is the Internet auction sites and shops which sell the factories’ goods. Signed works by Turi Gramstad Oliver, Kari Nyquist, Gro Pedersen Claussen, Anne Lofthus and Inger Waage are among those who have created great interest among collectors, both national and international. Because many of the products were exported, they are collectables found on international Net auction sites.

== Other sources ==
- Jostein Berglyd: Alt har sin tid. Trygve Brekke ser tilbake. Private print, Stavanger 1993.
- Jan Gjerde: Fra Kvaleberg til cyberspace. Glimt fra Stavangerflints historie. With summary in English. ISBN 978-82-303-0998-8.
- Ulf E. Rosenberg (editor): Figgjo, Formet av entusiasme gjennom 60 år - 1941 - 2001. Private print by Figgjo AS 2001.
