= Eystein Sandnes =

Norwegian artist

Eystein Sandnes (7 November 1927 – 14 November 2006) was a Norwegian ceramic and glass designer who is known particularly for work done at the ceramic industries Stavangerflint AS and AS Porsgrunds Porselænsfabrik

== Biography ==
Sandes was born in Røros Municipality in the county of Sør-Trøndelag, Norway, and died in Porsgrunn Municipality in the county of Telemark, Norway. He was educated both as a ceramist and as a glass designer with Norwegian National Academy of Craft and Art Industry in Oslo (1945–1949). From 1951 he was a glass designer at AS Norsk Glassverk, Magnor, where he gained recognition for his artistic talent. He received the government's scholarship for applied arts in 1954/1955. From 1955 to 1957 he held the position of design director at the earthenware company Stavangerflint AS, Stavanger, Norway. In 1958, Sandnes moved to AS Porsgrunds Porselænsfabrik, Porsgrunn, Norway, where he became head of the Design Department in 1959. He held this position until retirement 1990.

== Artist and artistic manager ==
He developed new designs for production, creating his most well-known models as Utstein and Ledaal there. They were produced for several years with different basic single tone colours which allowed for many combinations, but also with designs by various other artists at the company. Inger Waage, Anne Lofthus and Kari Nyquist made many of their most recognised designs for models created by Eystein Sandnes. A tea set modelled by Eystein Sandnes and with a design by Kari Nyquist was obtained by the Victoria and Albert Museum, London. It was Sandnes who introduced the principles of Scandinavian Design at Stavangerflint AS.

At Porsgrunds Porselænsfabrik, Sandnes designed the tea and dinner service Jubileum and the oven-proof Askeladden, which received the design award of the Norwegian Design Council in 1965, the breakfast and dinner service Epoke, which received the same award in 1969, and the tea coffee and dinner service Eystein 2440/80045, which was awarded in 1971.

== Awards and recognition ==
He received awards for Good Design by the Norwegian Design Council in 1965, 1969 and in 1971. In 1960 he was awarded a silver medal at the 12th Triennale for Design in Milan. Sandnes has been represented at several exhibitions in Norway and abroad and his works are included in many collections, among them the National Museum of Art, Architecture and Design, Oslo, and the Victoria and Albert Museum, London. His tableware was among the examples of Scandinavian design shown at the 1982 exhibition "Scandinavian Modern: 1880-1980" at the Cooper-Hewitt Museum in New York City.
