= Figgjo (company) =

Norwegian ceramics company

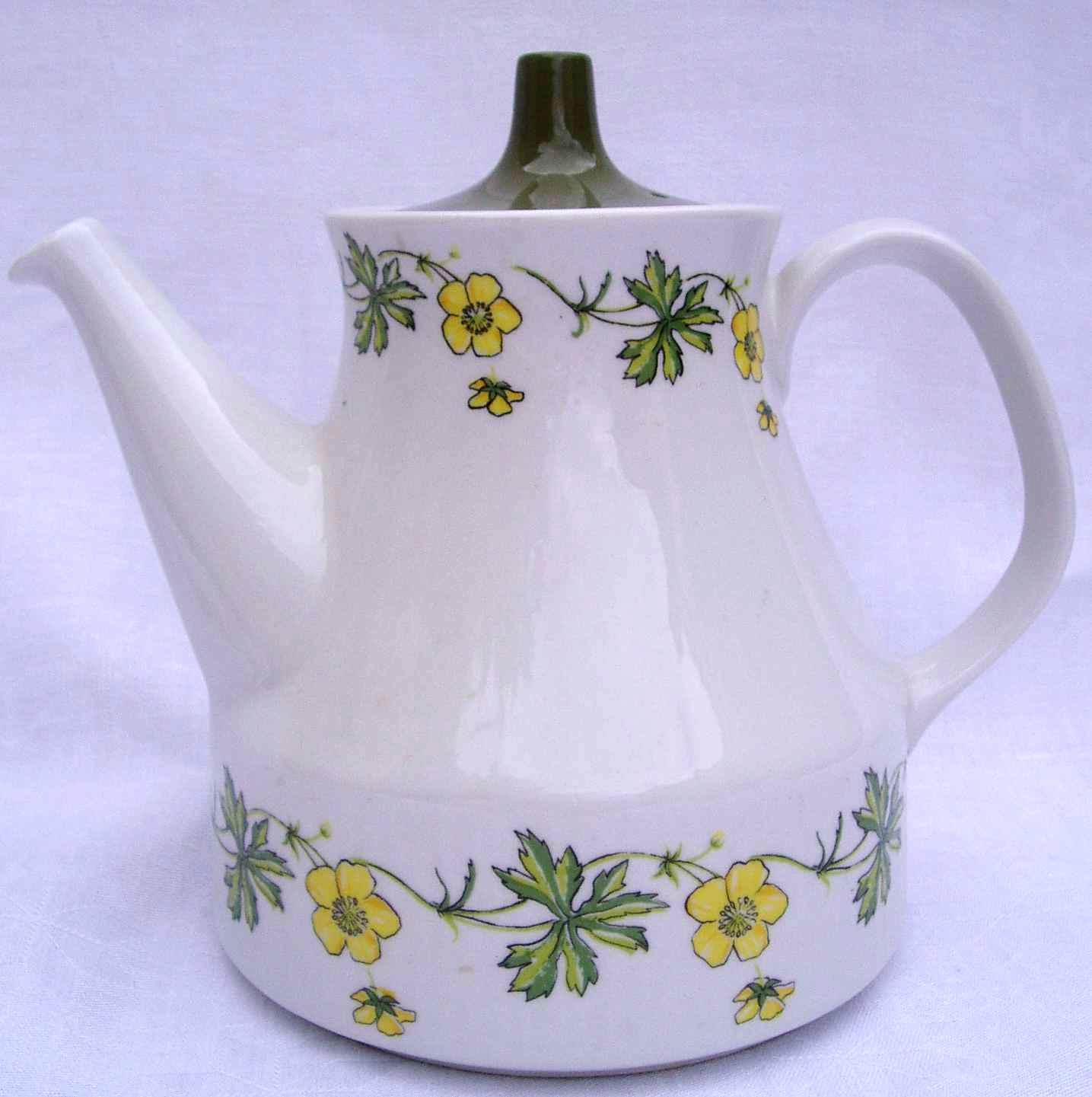
Smørblomst tekanne designed by Ragnar Grimsrud

Figgjo AS is a Norwegian ceramics manufacturing company based in Figgjo in the municipality of Sandnes, Norway.

== History ==
Figgjo was founded by Harald Lima and Sigurd Figved in 1941 as a small-scale pottery workshop. In 1946, designer and ceramist Ragnar Grimsrud (1902-1988) became co-owner and general manager of Figgjo. Grimsrud's design philosophy for the company was "'One must offer 'something for everyone,'" meaning that Figgjo had to offer products for both Scandinavian design enthusiasts and everyday consumers in order to be successful. Following World War II, Figgjo expanded into industrial manufacture of earthenware, building a new factory plant that was completed in 1947. The company took its current form in 1968 following the merger of Stavangerflint AS with Figgjo Fajanse AS.

In the 1950s, new decoration techniques for silkscreen printing of patterns and applying colored slip to products made it easier to produce a large portfolio of popular and distinctive designs at scale. However, by the 1960s, the onset of international free trade in Norway forced Figgjo to change their operational strategy to stay competitive with imports. They scaled back their product offerings to a limited range of new models, adaptable to feature any number of decorations and patterns in different styles, in order to cater to a wide range of markets. From 1956 to 1964, Figgjo collaborated with noted Norwegian freelance designer Hermann Bongard, who produced a number of successful tableware products for the company. Other notable designers who worked for Figgjo include Turi Gramstad Oliver, Inger Waage, and Kåre Berven Fjeldsaa.

Today, the company has a factory, museum and factory outlet at Figgjo. It specializes in vitrified china for the domestic and professional catering markets. The underglaze backstamps FF, Figgjo Fajanse and Figgjo Flint are found on the company's products. Figgjo is the sole remaining domestic ceramic tableware manufacturer in Norway. In addition, Figgjo tableware from the 1960s and 1970s continues to be highly collectible alongside its more recent offerings, with examples featured in the decorative arts collections of the Jærmuseet, National Gallery of Victoria and the Indianapolis Museum of Art.

== Examples of Figgjo ceramics ==
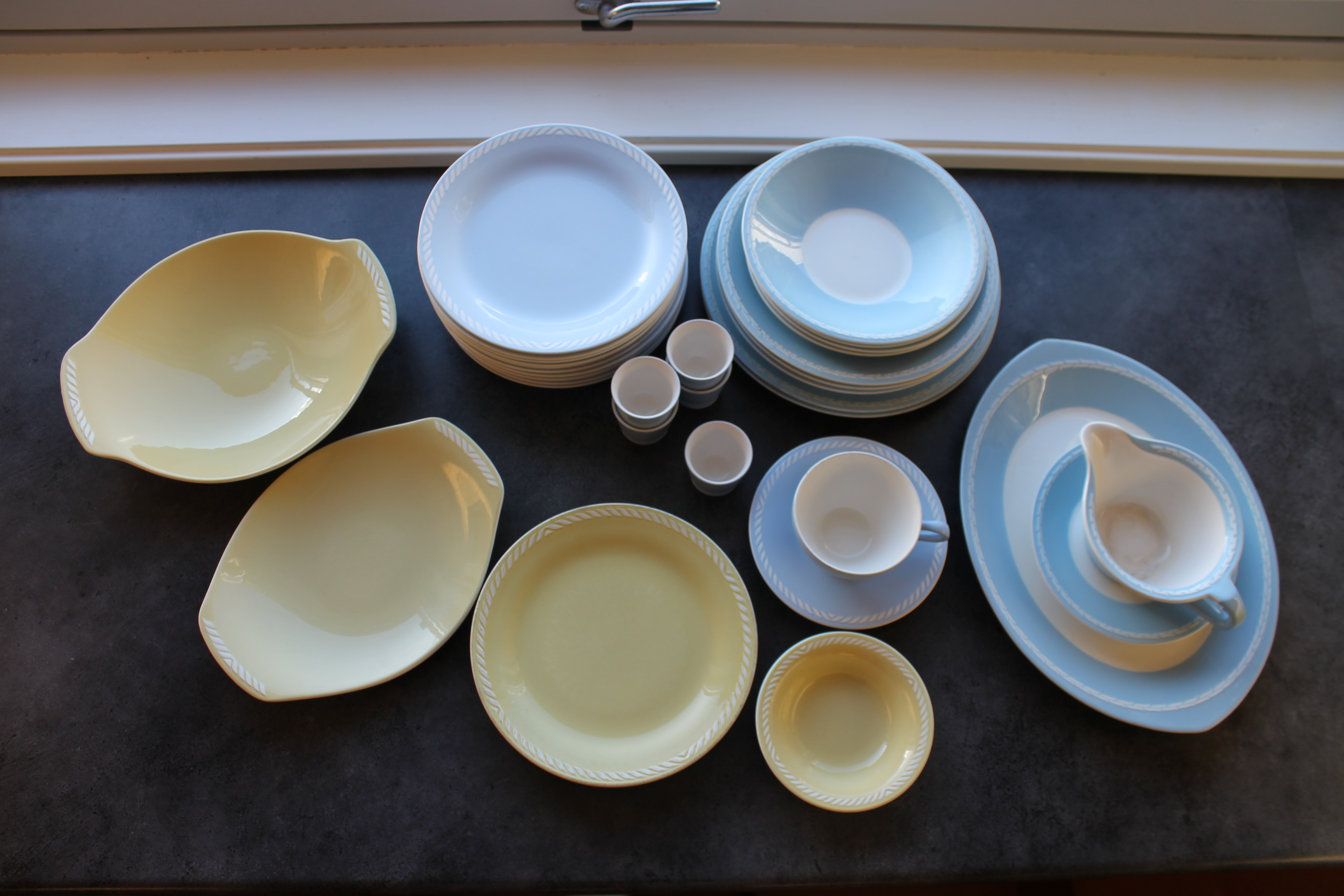
Figgjo "Sissel" line of tableware designed by Ragnar Grimsud

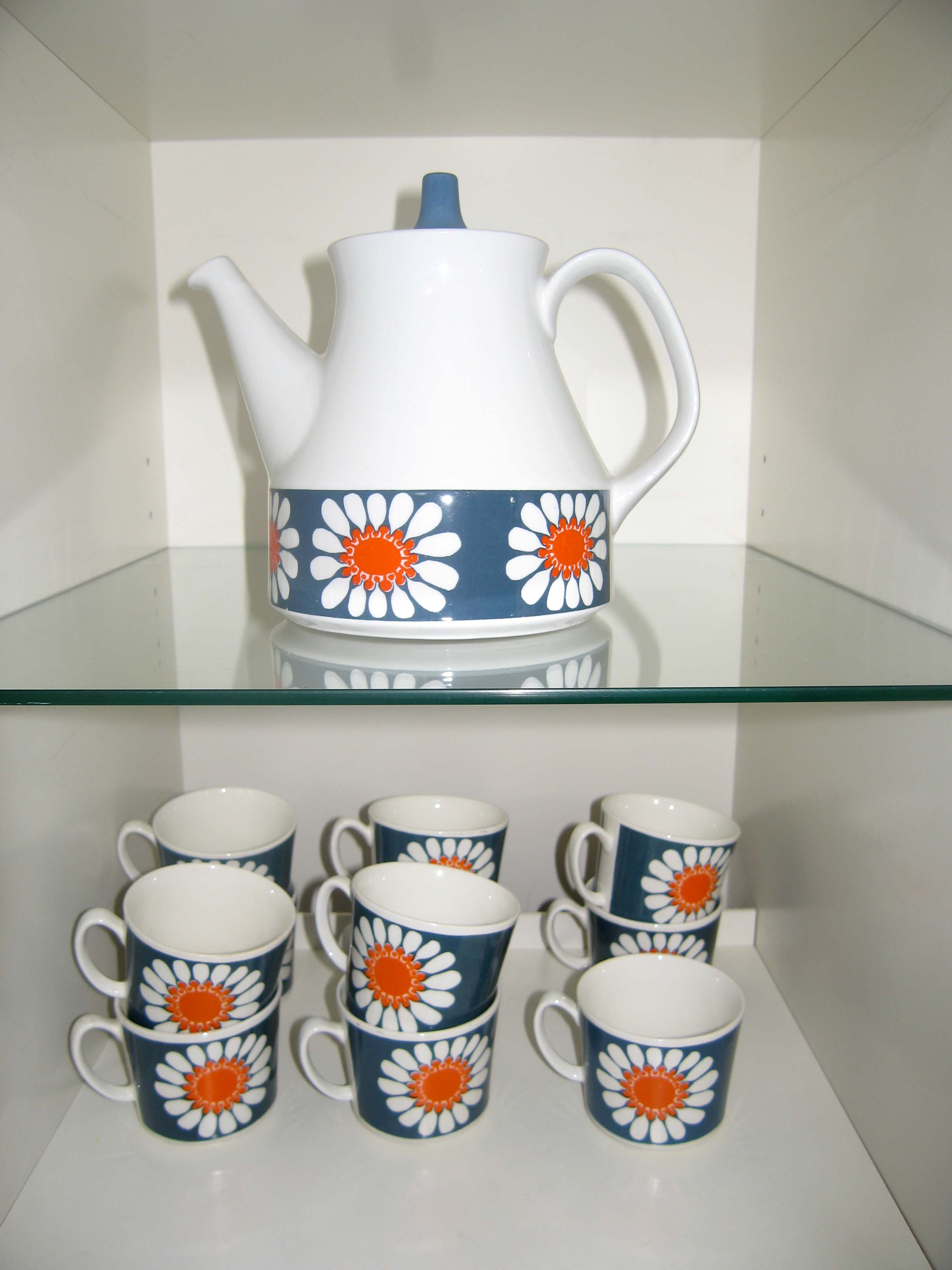
Figgjo "Daisy" tableware designed by Turi Gramstad Oliver

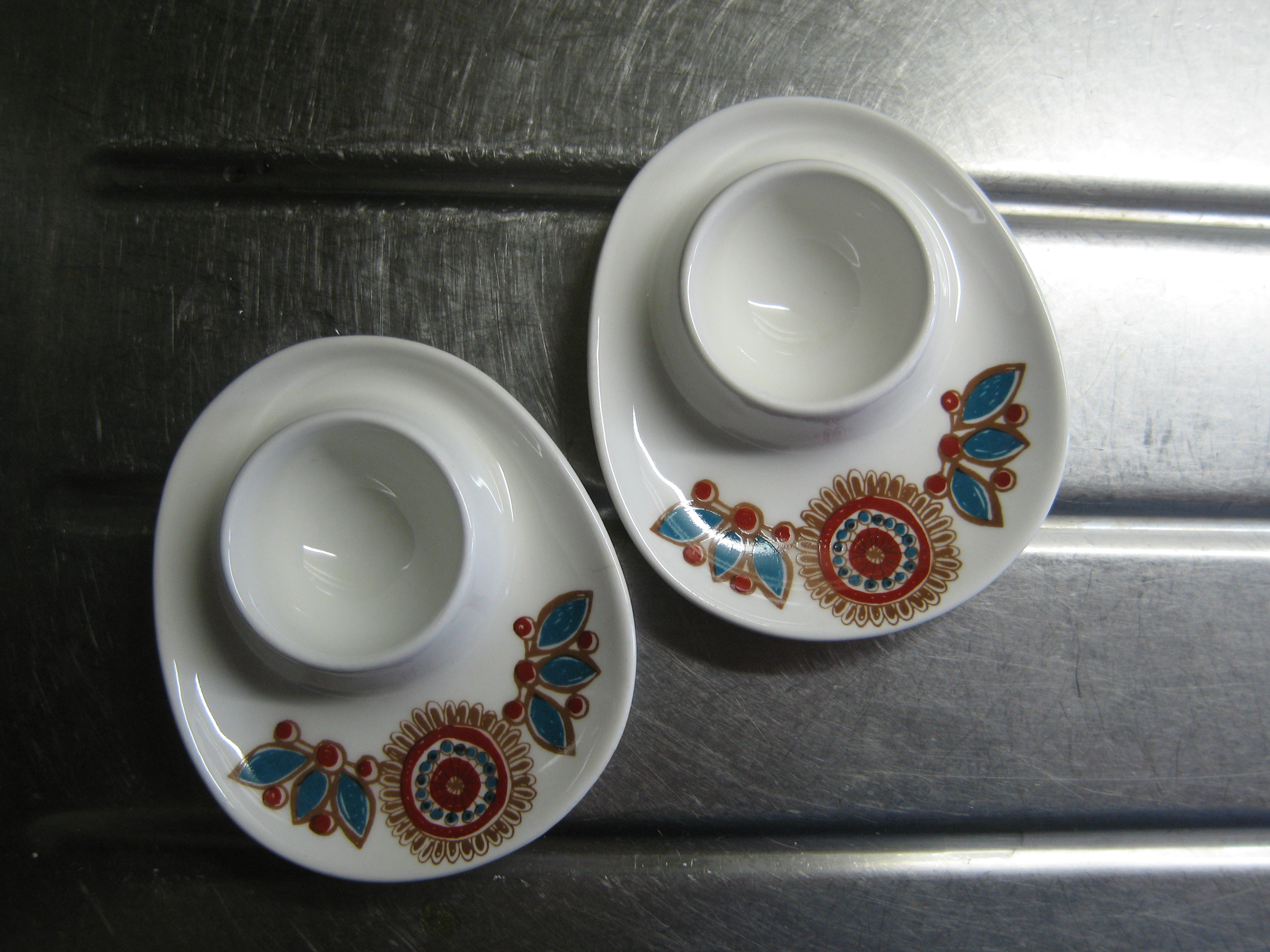
A photograph of two Figgjo egg holders in the Astrid pattern.

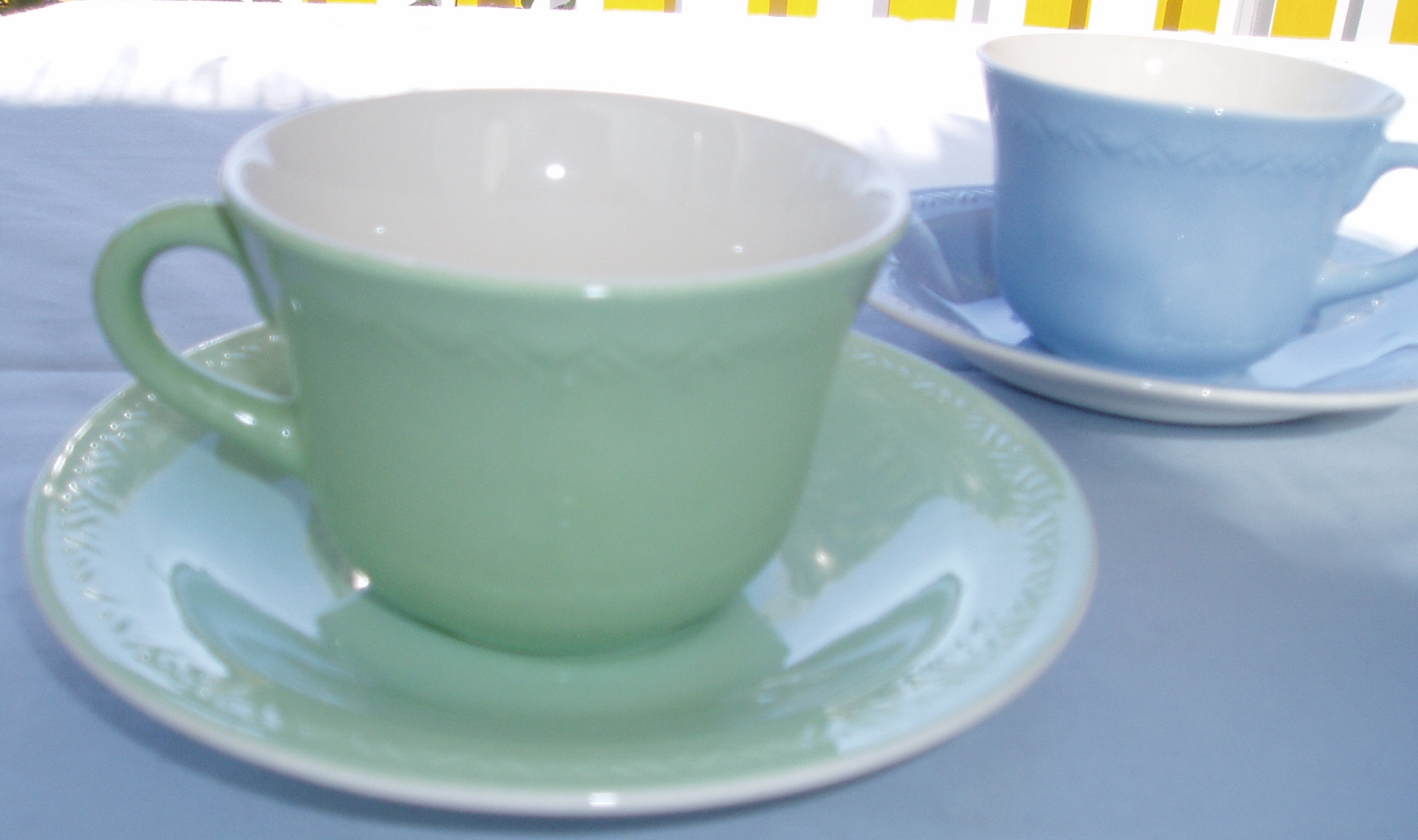
Figgjo "Sissel" line of tableware designed by Ragnar Grimsrud

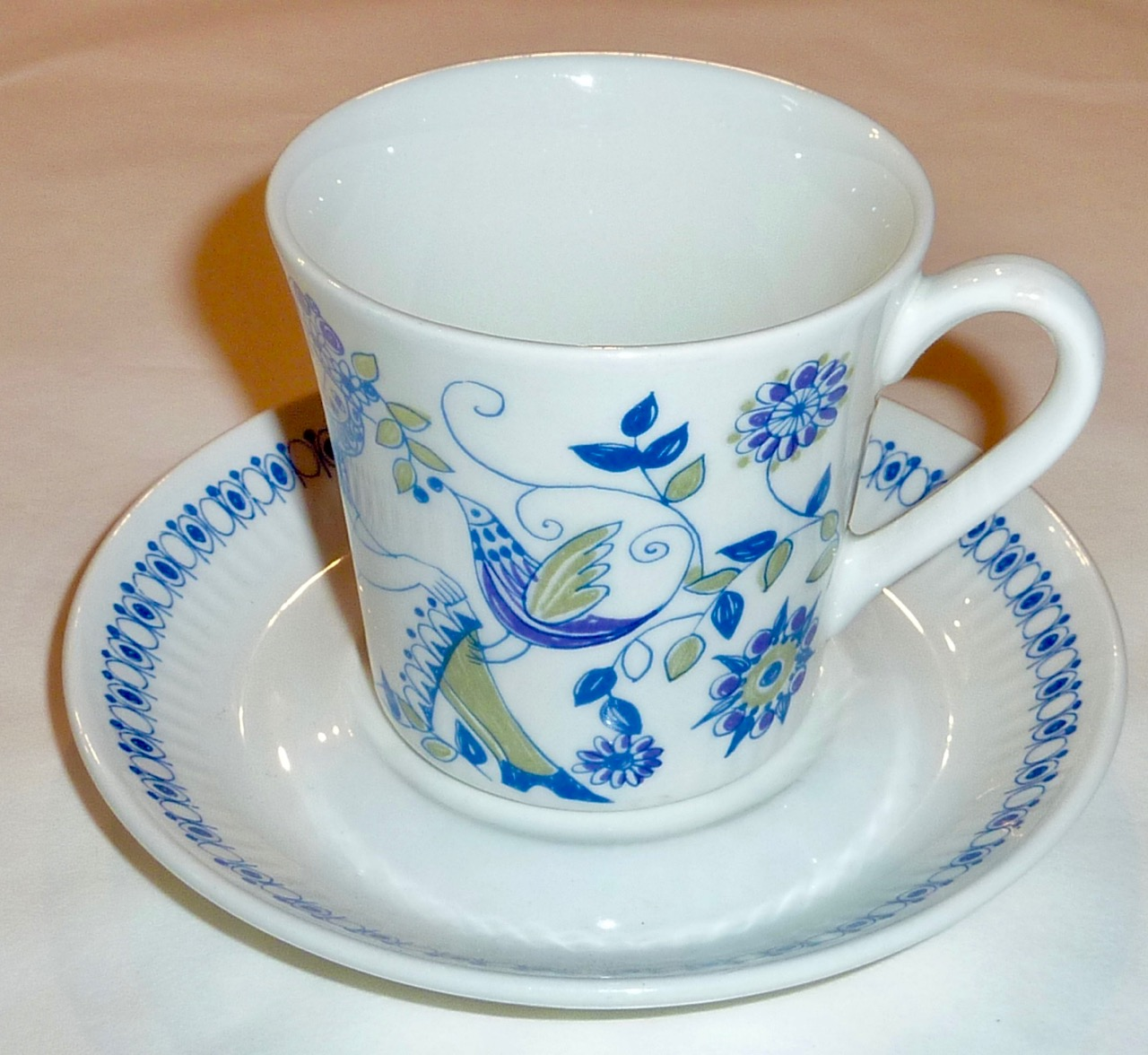
Figgjo "Lotte" design cup and saucer.
