= Ganddal Station =

Railway station in Sandnes, Norway

Ganddal
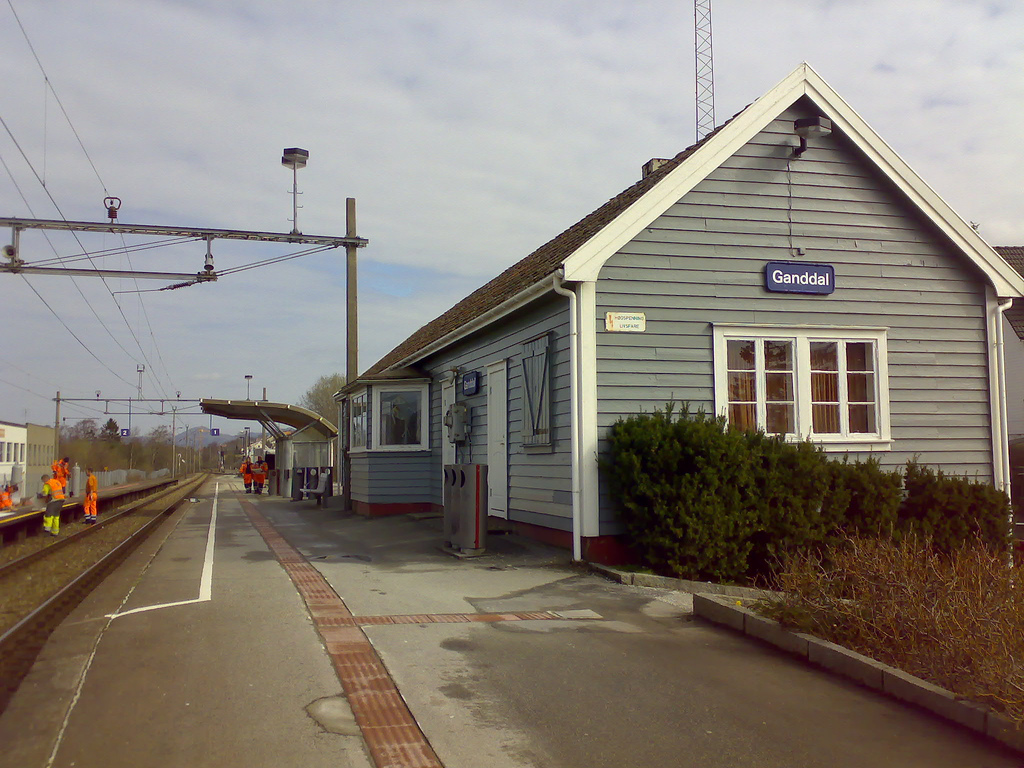

General information
- Location: Ganddal, Sandnes Municipality; Norway
- Coordinates: 58°49′24″N 5°43′0″E
- Elevation: 22.5 m (74 ft) AMSL
- Owner: Bane NOR
- Operator: Go-Ahead Norge
- Lines: Sørlandet Line; Ålgård Line
- Distance: 580.55 km (360.74 mi)
- Platforms: 2

History
- Opened: 1880
Location

Ganddal Station (Norwegian: Ganddal stasjon) is a railway station in the western part of Sandnes Municipality in Rogaland county, Norway. The station is located just south of the centre of the city of Sandnes in the borough of Ganddal. It sits along the Sørlandet Line with long-distance service to Stavanger to the north and Kristiansand to the southeast. The station is also served by the Jæren Commuter Rail with local service between Stavanger and Egersund. The station is 18.49 kilometers (11.49 mi) south of Stavanger. The station is simply a shelter and it has no bathrooms, food services, or ticket counters.

== History ==
The Ålgård Line splits off from the main Sørlandet Line at Ganddal, but passenger traffic was terminated in 1955 and freight traffic ended in 1988. The station has been in use since 1 March 1878 when the Sørlandet Line opened. The station was first named Høiland from 1 March 1878 until 1 July 1917 when it was renamed Ganddalen. In April 1921, the name was shortened to Ganddal.

Preceding station	Local trains	Following station
Skeiane towards Stavanger	L5 Jæren Commuter Rail	Øksnevadporten towards Egersund
