= Thorbjørn Feyling =

Thorbjørn Feyling (1907–1985) was a Norwegian ceramist and Head of design at the Norwegian earthenware company Stavangerflint AS in the city of Stavanger in south-western Norway. Feyling was Head of design at the Norwegian earthenware producer Stavangerflint AS from its foundation in 1946 until 1955. He was a member of Stavangerflint's management team and created the company's design program for the production start in 1949 and the following years. He served the company as an artist designer until retirement. Many of his designs are well-known collector items.

== Biography ==
Feyling was born in Egersund and died in Stavanger, Norway. He was trained as a ceramist before World War II and then employed at A/S Egersunds Fayancefabriks Co until 1946. He was then recruited to the position of Manager of design at Stavanger Fajansefabrikk, Stavanger, from 1952 renamed into Stavangerflint AS. Here he created the company's design program from scratch. From production start in September 1949, he became a member of the company's management team. From 1955 Feyling was replaced by Eystein Sandnes as Head of design. He continued working as a designer for the factory until retirement in 1977.

== The ceramic artist ==
Feyling's designs were adopted to meet the taste of different consumer groups. His most well-known forms are those named Glatt, Standard, Skaugum and Bygdøy. They were produced for many years with a variety of decorative designs, created by himself or other artists. The designs were either sprayed, hand painted or made from ready-made transfer pictures. Finer objects may have been applied with strokes of gold painting. He created many series of exclusive objects for gifts and decoration, as well as a large range of souvenirs for cities and tourist sites in Norway and abroad.
