= Inger Waage =

Norwegian industrial ceramist (1923–1995)

Inger Waage (5 February 1923 – 16 December 1995), was an industrial ceramist at the Norwegian producer of earthenware, Stavangerflint AS.

== Biography ==
Igner Waage was born in Stavanger on the West coast of Norway. In 1943 she was accepted as a student at the Norwegian National Academy of Craft and Art Industry in Oslo to study ceramics for three years. After graduation in 1946, she moved back to Stavanger and started her own ceramic workshop.

Inger Waage became the first leader of a new established department for handicraft products at Stavangerflint AS in 1953. By 1955 her works were recognised by the market to such a degree that the company had to expand the production capacity by establishing an I.W department, with up to ten assistant artists to cope with the orders of hand painted ceramic objects from the UK, US and other countries.

In 1968 Stavangerflint A/S merged with Figgjo Fajanse AS. The main office and the leadership of the artistic functions were moved to Figgjo. Inger Waage continued her work at the Stavanger branch for eleven more years, and was also a member of the company's artistic team, until 1979 when the branch in Stavanger was closed down and Inger Waage left the company. She died in Stavanger, aged 72 years.

== Works ==
Inger Waage's works may be divided into five main categories:

1. Objects of applied arts (hand painted, in a combination of silk screen and hand painting, or solely silk screen)
2. Designs for tableware (for household, children, hotels and institutions)
3. Designs for souvenirs and give-away objects
4. Unique pieces and objects for special occasions
5. Works from her own pottery studio

Inger Waage is best known for her hand-painted decorative objects of art from the 1950s. Inger Waage's decorative design for tableware became an important part of her work and of the collection of Stavangerflint. From among her most renowned designs are: Flamingo – Bambus, Flamingo –Chef, Sera, Smørbukk, Senja and Kon Tiki. Bambus is represented at The National Museum of Art, Architecture and Design in Oslo. Her work is also permanently exhibited at the Norwegian Museum of Cultural History in Bygdøy, Oslo.

Souvenirs designed by Inger Waage are nearly always signed and are recognised by her drawing style.

== Sources ==
- Gjerde, Jan Gjerde: Håndmalt – inger. Inger Waage 1923 -1995. With English Summary. Stavanger 2008. ISBN 978-82-997803-0-8
- "From the history of Stavangerflint", Stavanger Museum Årbok 2006 (The annual report from The Museum of Stavanger 2006), ISBN 978-82-90054-69-9
