= Chateau Neuf =

Building in Oslo, Norway

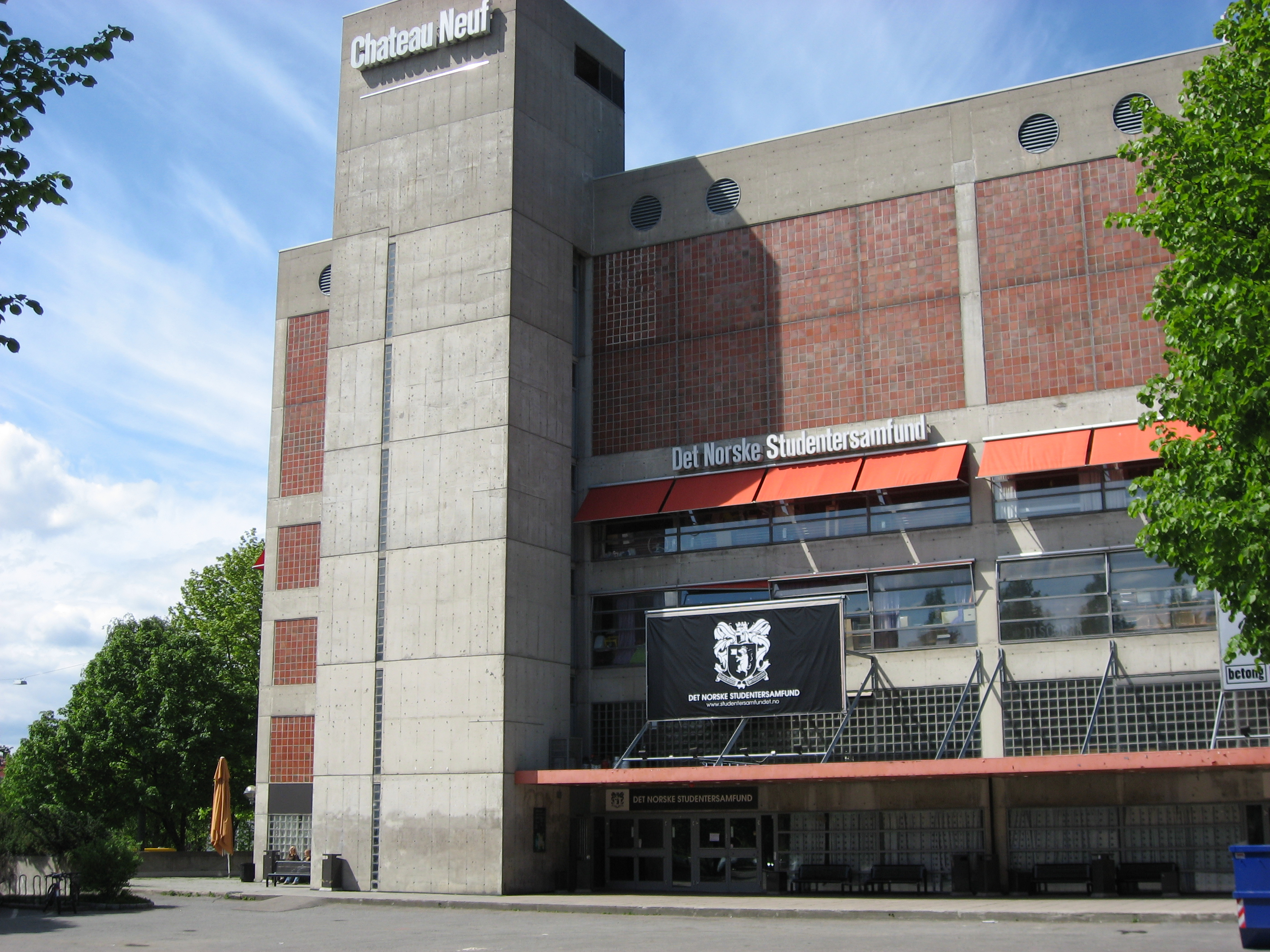
- Chateau Neuf
- Interactive map of the Chateau Neuf area

General information
- Location: Oslo, Norway
- Coordinates: 59.9323°N 10.7126°E
- Construction started: 1963
- Completed: 1973
- Client: Det Norske Studentersamfund

Design and construction
- Architects: Kjell Lund and Nils Slaatto

Chateau Neuf is a building in Oslo, Norway, that houses the Norwegian Students' Society (Det Norske Studentersamfund) including cafes, bars, performance centers, and other facilities for student assembly. It is situated at Slemdalsveien 15 near Majorstuen just south of the main campus of the University of Oslo at Blindern.

== Name ==
Though the name Chateau Neuf literally means 'new castle' in French. It also involves a pun on the French word neuf, which is pronounced like the Norwegian onomatopoeia for 'oink', alluding to the Student Society's personified patron and coat of arms symbol, "His Majesty the Pig" (Hans Majestet Grisen).

== History ==
Although the Students' Society was housed in permanent facilities at Universitetsgaten 26 from 1861 onwards, the society outgrew this structure by 1918 and moved to different locations around the city. During the German occupation of Norway (1940–1945), the Student Society was dissolved due to oppositional attitudes to the occupying forces, and was re-established after the liberation in 1945.

In the 1950s, funds were raised to build a new structure, spearheaded by Jan P. Syse (1930–1997). Based on expansion plans for the University of Oslo, the site was picked, though the university changed its plans after Chateau Neuf's construction had started.

Ground was broken by C. J. Hambro in 1963 in commemoration of the 150th anniversary of the founding of the society. The architects were Kjell Lund and Nils Slaatto. Construction was complete in 1971 and officially opened in 1973.
