= Kjell Lund =

Norwegian architect, songwriter and singer (1927–2013)

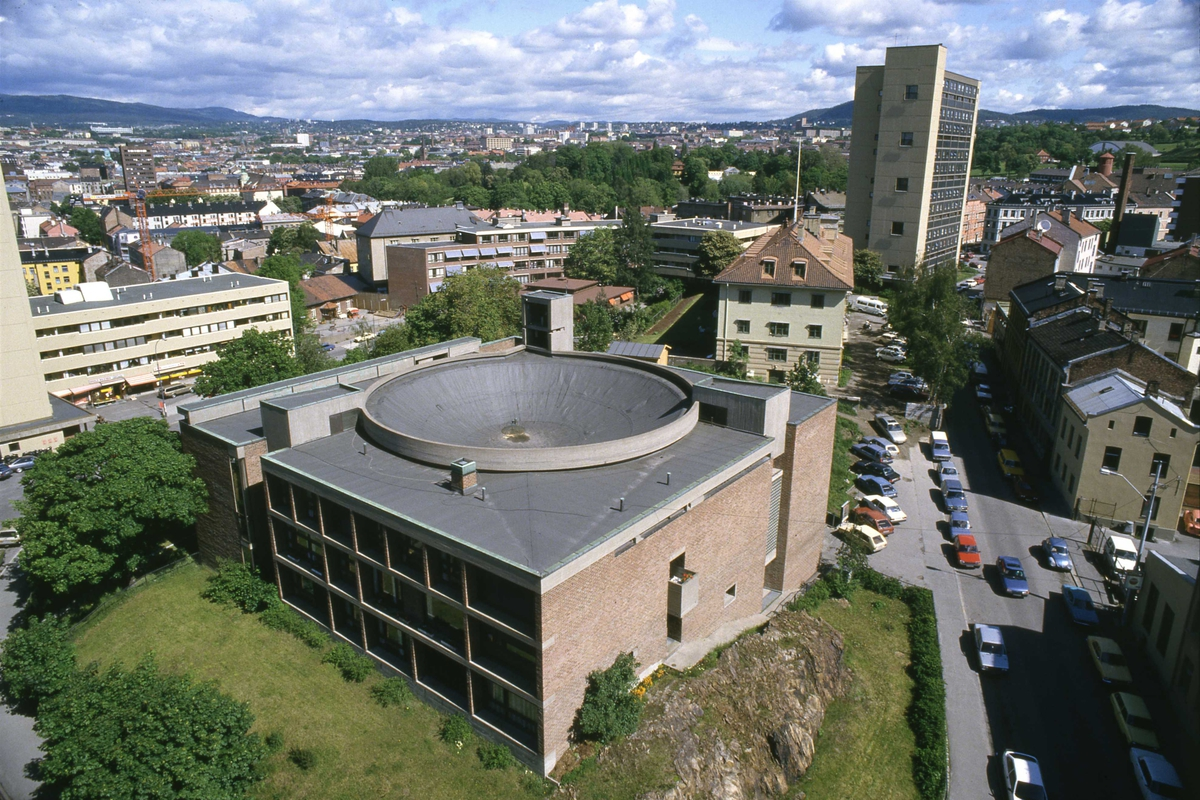
St. Hallvard's Church and Monastery

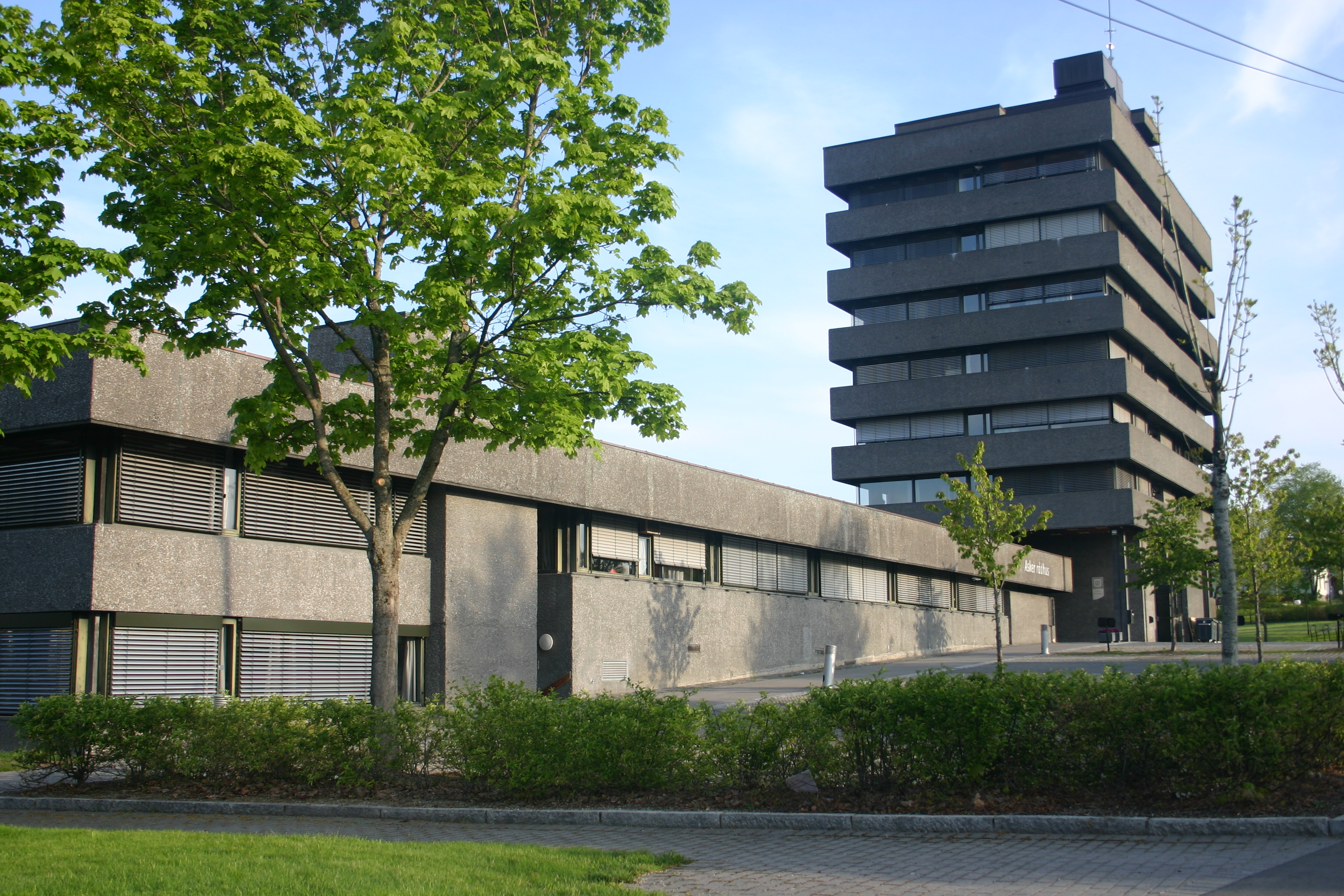
Asker City Hall

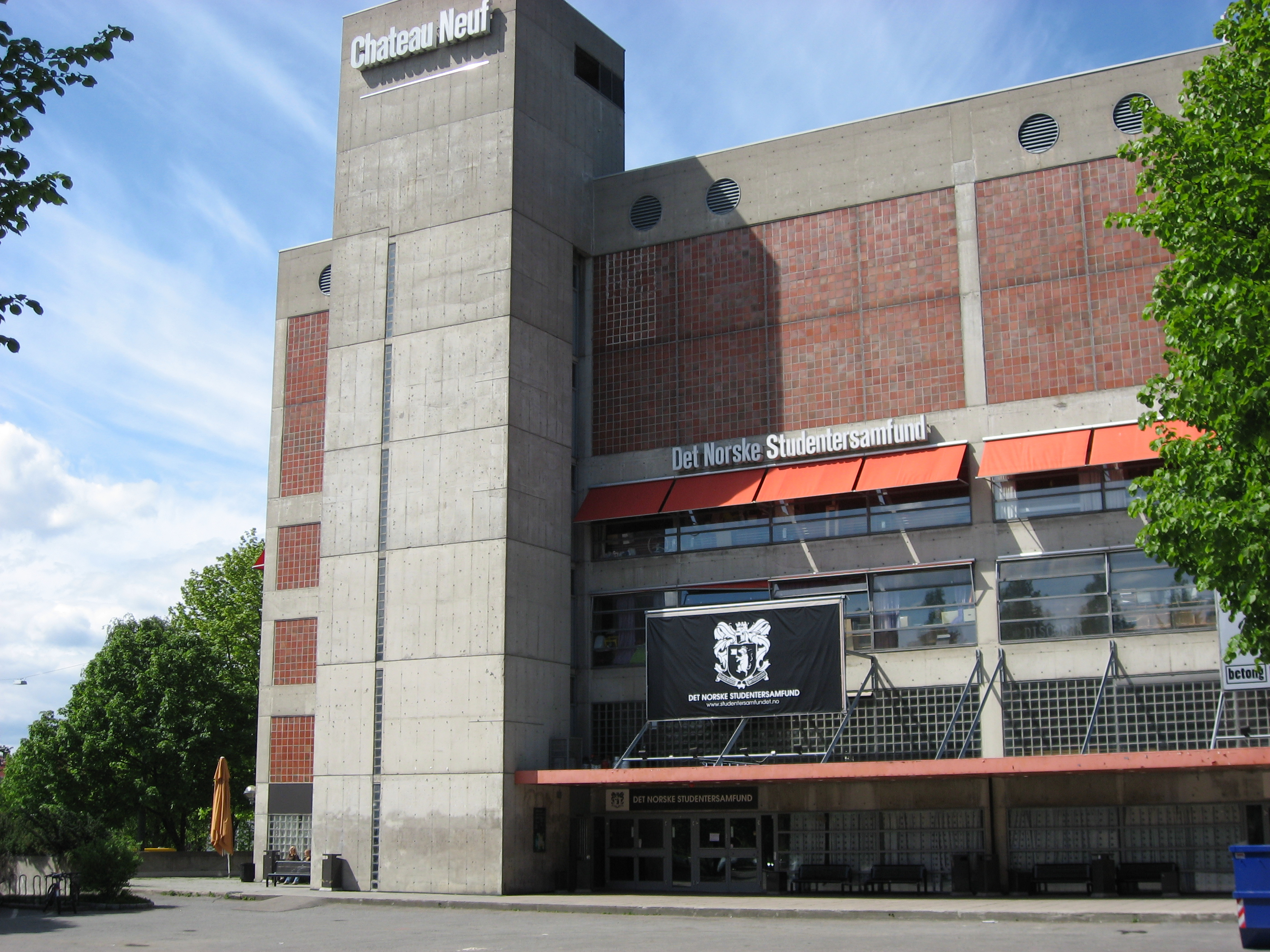
Chateau Neuf

Kjell Lund (18 June 1927 – 17 August 2013) was a Norwegian architect, songwriter and singer. Lund cooperated with Nils Slaatto for many years.

== Personal life ==
Lund was born in Lillehammer as a son of civil servant Arve Johan Lund and Margit Tora Hornes. He married Tove Berg in 1954. He died in August 2013.

== Career ==
He studied at the Norwegian Institute of Technology whence he graduated in 1950. The architectural firm of Lund & Slaatto Arkitekter AS founded in 1958 as a partnership of Kjell Lund and Nils Slaatto. This firm was in operation until 1995. Among their designs are Asker City Hall (Asker rådhus) and Chateau Neuf, a student center at the University of Oslo at Blindern. They also designed the popular system Ålhytta, a module based construction system developed in 1969.

They also designed several churches. Among these is the St. Hallvard's Church and Monastery on Enerhaugen. The Roman Catholic facility was awarded the Houen Foundation Award in 1975.

Lund was an honorary member of the organizations National Association of Norwegian Architects, the American Institute of Architects and the Royal Swedish Academy of Arts. He was decorated Knight, First Class of the Royal Norwegian Order of St. Olav in 1985, and also awarded the Prince Eugen Medal.

Among his best known songs are Her kommer guttemusikken and Den store sinte svarte skumle katta til fru Haugen.
