= William Knutzen =

Norwegian ceramist

William Knutzen (4 July 1913 – 11 February 1983) was a Norwegian ceramist. He was born in Christiania. He established his own workshop in Oslo in 1933, and had his exhibition debut in 1935. From 1946 to 1949 he was artistical leader at Graverens Teglverk in Sandnes. He is represented in various museums, including the National Museum of Art, Architecture and Design, the Victoria and Albert Museum in London, and museums in Vienna and in Faenza. After he established his own ceramics workshop in Oslo in 1933, he joined the company with Andreas Thiele Schneider in 1937. The established Schneider & Knutzen der Knutzen became the artistic driving force. That same year, William Knutzen participated in the Norwegian Pavilion at the World Exhibition in Paris. From around 1940 he often worked with chamotte ceramics with coarse, elegantly sharpened patterns and bold colors on creamy tin glass. During the period 1946–49, Knutzen was artistic director of the ceramics department at Graveren. At the same time as he established a new workshop in 1949, he also became an artistic director of Arnold Wiig's Fabrikker in Halden. Knutzens works from the early 1950s are characterized by an experimental abstract form in partially glazed red-colored.

== Education ==
- 1930-1931 Workshop at Eilif Whist
- 1932-33 Workshop at Andreas Thiele Schneider
- 1933-35 State Crafts and Art Industry School
