= Sidsel Helliesen =

Norwegian art historian (born 1944)

Sidsel Helliesen (born 22 April 1944) is a Norwegian art historian.

From 1973 to 2000 she led the National Gallery of Norway department on copper engraving and drawing. She played an instrumental role in merging the National Gallery with other institutions to the National Museum of Art, Architecture and Design.

She took the dr.philos. degree at the University of Oslo in 2001. Her works on printmaking include Norsk grafikk gjennom 100 år (2000) and works on Rolf Nesch (2009) and Thorbjørn Egner (2012). She was inducted into the Norwegian Academy of Science and Letters.
