= Sigmund Feyling =

Norwegian priest

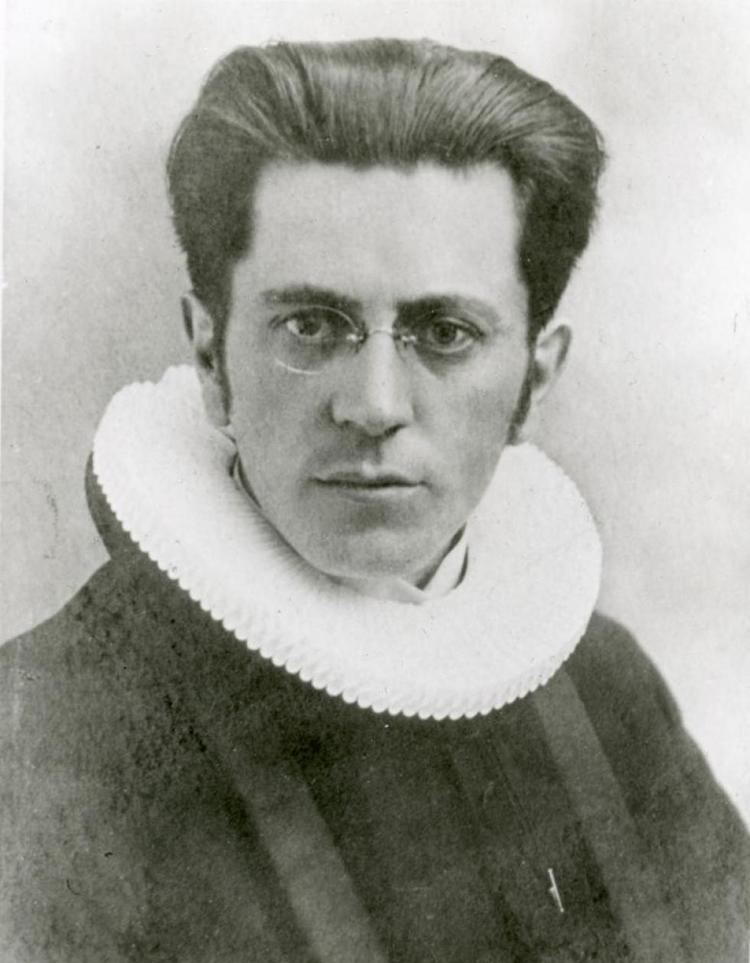
Sigmund Feyling

Sigmund Feyling (8 May 1895 – 1980) was a priest who served as a civil servant representing Nasjonal Samling during the Second World War.

He was born in Egersund. He finished his secondary education in 1916, took the cand.theol. Degree in 1924, practical-theological seminary in 1926 and was ordained as a priest in the same year. He was appointed as a curate in his hometown in 1926, promoted to vicar in 1929 and dean in 1936.

During the occupation of Norway by Nazi Germany he joined the Fascist party Nasjonal Samling. In February 1941 he was appointed as deputy under-secretary of state in the Ministry of Education and Church Affairs, and his tenure which lasted until 1945 was marked by an endeavor to nazificate the Church of Norway. He issued Liv og lære (1937, reissue 1941), Kirke og stat (1941) and Kirkelig hvitbok (1942).

After the war, he worked part-time for the Inner Mission in Oslo between 1955 and 1964. He resided in Oslo. He died in 1980.
