= Ganddal =

Borough in Sandnes, Norway

Bydel Ganddal
- Borough
- Coat of arms

- Location within Sandnes Municipality
- Interactive map of Bydel Ganddal
- Coordinates: 58°49′N 05°43′E
- Country: Norway
- Region: Western Norway
- County: Rogaland
- District: Jæren
- City: Sandnes

Area
  - Total: 12.1 km^{2} (4.7 sq mi)

Population (2016)
  - Total: 7,318
  - Density: 605/km^{2} (1,570/sq mi)
- Time zone: UTC+01:00 (CET)
  - Summer (DST): UTC+02:00 (CEST)
- Post Code: 4306 Sandnes

Ganddal is a borough of the city of Sandnes in the west part of the large Sandnes Municipality in Rogaland county, Norway. The 12.1-square-kilometre (4.7 sq mi) borough is located in the southwest part of the municipality. Ganddal has a population (2016) of 7,318.

It has one of the city's largest industrial areas and the Jæren Line railroad runs through the area, which is served by the commuter and goods station, Ganddal Station. The Norwegian National Road 44 runs through Ganddal's west side, providing easy access to central Sandnes.

Ganddal is known for Stokkelandsvatnet which is a small lake in the centre of Ganddal. Sports clubs include Ganddal IL as well as the powerlifting and strongman club Ganddal AK. Ganddal has four schools, including primary schools Ganddal skole and Sørbø skole. Sandnes Friskole is a private school from 1st to 10th grade, organized by Familiekirken and Betel Hommersåk. Lundehaugen ungdomskole is a school from 8th to 10th grade.
