= Anne Lofthus =

Norwegian ceramic artist and art teacher (1932–2003)

Anne Lofthus Valla (29 February 1932 – 6 October 2003) was a Norwegian ceramic artist and art teacher. Her artistic style was influenced by the folk-culture of rural Norway, in particular the cultural traditions from Telemark, where she was born and grew up.

== Background ==
Anne Lofthus was born at the Lofthus Farm in Vinje Municipality in Telemark county, and died in Hemnes Municipality in Nordland County, Norway. From 1954 to 1957 she was educated as a ceramist at the Norwegian National Academy of Craft and Art Industry in Oslo, with Jens von der Lippe as supervisor. She was employed in von der Lippe's workshop as a ceramist from 1958 to 1959. She married the teacher and farmer Torbjørn Valla in 1967 and moved to Korgen in Hemnes Municipality. There, she continued teaching and also accepted many freelance assignments.

== Artistic career ==
From 1959 to 1963 she was engaged as a designer at the Stavangerflint AS earthenware factory in Stavanger, Norway where she served as a member of the company's artistic staff under the directorship of Kåre Berven Fjeldsaa. While employed at Stavangerflint, Anne Lofthus created designs for ceramic tableware and items for decoration or special occasions. She also made many souvenir objects for cities and tourist sites in Norway and abroad. Her most famous designs for tableware are Tiril, Vinge and the children's set Du som metter liten fugl (Lord you feed the little bird).

She left Stavangerflint in 1963 and in 1963/64 she continued her education at the National School for Teaching of Woodwork and Drawing in Notodden, Norway. In subsequent years she worked as a teacher, giving lessons in Arts and Crafts while continuing to work as a ceramist. Anne Lofthus created the coat of arms of Hemnes Municipality, in Norway, and established her own ceramic workshop at Valla, Norway where she was active until 1996.

Her style as an artist is usually easily recognizable by her references to Norwegian Folk Art, such as the décor-objects Stolt Margit and Folklore both of which are based on inspiration from the cultural heritage of the Telemark region.

== Other sources ==
- Gjerde, Jan (2007) Glimt Fra Stavangerflints Historie (Stavanger: Stavangerflint AS) ISBN 978-82-303-0998-8
