= Norwegian Students' Society =

Norway's oldest association for students

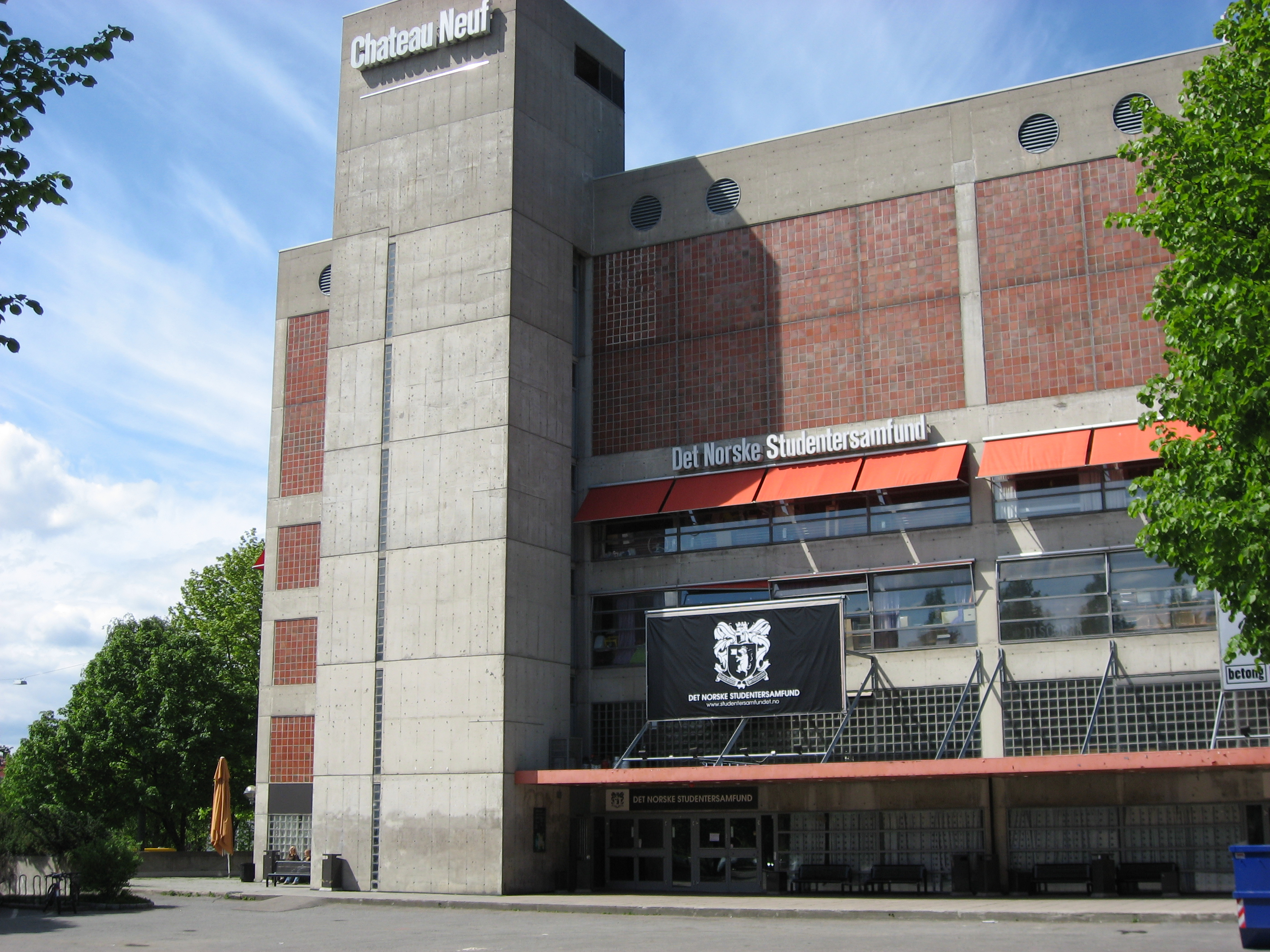
Chateau Neuf, headquarters of the Norwegian Students' Society

Norwegian Students' Society (Norwegian: Det Norske Studentersamfund) is Norway's oldest student society.

The Norwegian Students' Society was established during 1813 in Oslo, Norway. Two years after the Royal Frederick University (today named the University of Oslo) was founded, 18 of the 19 students formed the Norwegian Students' Society. It has been the centre of debate, culture and politics for over 200 years. The idea was to make a social, intellectual and cultural arena for the students in Norway's capital. Originally a closed literary club, in 1820 it was opened for all students. In future years, the Society played a role in national debate, including contributing substantially to the establishment of May 17 as Norwegian Constitution Day.

Today the Society is located at Chateau Neuf, a large concrete block building to the south of the Blindern Campus. Opened in 1971, the building also contains several cafes and a cinema. Most of the activity at Chateau Neuf is generated by volunteers with people signing up for the many different jobs at hand. The Society frequently arrange debates, lectures and concerts. The Society also hosts its own theater and music groups.
