= Figgjo =

Borough in Sandnes, Norway

Bydel Figgjo
- Borough
- Coat of arms

- Location within Sandnes Municipality
- Interactive map of Bydel Figgjo
- Coordinates: 58°47′N 05°49′E
- Country: Norway
- Region: Western Norway
- County: Rogaland
- District: Jæren
- City: Sandnes

Area
  - Total: 16.7 km^{2} (6.4 sq mi)

Population (2016)
  - Total: 2,213
  - Density: 133/km^{2} (343/sq mi)
- Time zone: UTC+01:00 (CET)
  - Summer (DST): UTC+02:00 (CEST)
- Post Code: 4332 Figgjo

Figgjo is a borough of the city of Sandnes in the west part of the large Sandnes Municipality in Rogaland county, Norway. The borough is located in the southern part of the city. It has a population (2016) of 2,213. The borough is mostly rural, but the village of Figgjo lies on the southern edge of the municipality. About 90% of the population of the borough lives in the village of Figgjo.

Although it is part of the Sandnes Municipality, Statistics Norway considers the village of Figgjo to be a separate urban area (this urban area is not the same as the borough, just one part of it). In recent years, however, Figgjo has grown together with the large village of Ålgård, located immediately to the south in the neighboring Gjesdal Municipality. In 2025, Statistics Norway recorded the Ålgård-Figgjo urban area as having a combined population of 12,164. Figgjo's urban area alone has a population of 2,290.

Figgjo is known for the Figgjo factories. Previously, the village had a train station on the now closed Ålgård Line.
