= Bonytt =

Norwegian monthly home and interior design magazine

- Categories: Home and interior design magazine
- Frequency: Monthly
- Circulation: 25,203 (2022)
- Publisher: Egmont Hjemmet Mortensen A/S
- Founder: Arne Remlow; Per Tannum
- Founded: 1941; 85 years ago
- Company: Egmont/Orkla ASA
- Country: Norway
- Based in: Oslo
- Language: Norwegian

Bonytt is a Norwegian monthly home and interior design magazine based in Oslo, Norway. Founded in 1941, it is one of the oldest magazines in the country as well as the most popular magazine in its category.

== History and profile ==
Bonytt was established by Arne Remlow and Per Tannum in 1941. Ramlow was the owner and long-term editor-in-chief of the magazine, which has its headquarters in Oslo. The magazine is part of Egmont/Orkla ASA. It is published monthly by Egmont Hjemmet Mortensen A/S.

In 1947, the magazine become the official media outlet of the Norwegian Applied Art Association.

In the 1950s, it adopted a modernist approach, which was left later. It eventually positioned itself as a source for inspiration for the amateur interior designers.

In 1967, the magazine was renamed as Nye Bonytt to indicate its new approach.

In 2010, an iPad version of Bonytt was started.

== Circulation ==
In 1999, Bonytt sold 711,000 copies, making it the best-selling consumer special interest magazine in Norway. The circulation of the magazine was 68,000 copies in 2003. In 2006 the magazine sold 62,900 copies. Its 2022 circulation was 25,203 copies.
