= Kåre Berven Fjeldsaa =

Norwegian designer

Kåre Berven Fjeldsaa (27 November 1918 – 12 January 1992) was a Norwegian ceramic designer.

Fjeldsaa was born in Sandnes in the county of Rogaland, Norway. He was educated as a ceramicist at the Norwegian National Academy of Craft and Art Industry in Oslo 1937–1942 and trained in the workshop of Jens von der Lippe from 1936 to 1946. He received a scholarship in 1956 for study at The Royal Copenhagen Porcelain Manufactory in Copenhagen. From 1947 to 1957 he had his own workshop as a ceramist in the municipality of Bærum in Oslo. From 1958 Fjeldsaa became head of design at the earthenware factory Stavangerflint AS in Stavanger, Norway. After the merging of Stavangerflint AS and Figgjo Fajanse AS in 1968 to Figgjo Fajanse Stavangerflint AS, he continued as head of design and product development from 1973 to 1985.

As a ceramic artist Fjeldsaa was a pioneer in the use of stoneware. His objects from this period were highly appreciated and he was awarded a gold medal at the Triennal in Milan in 1954 and at the International Exhibition of Ceramics in Cannes in 1957. As artistic manager and designer at Stavangerflint he made his designs both in "flintware" (fine earthenware), ovenproof models, vitroporcelain and stoneware. His most well-known creations are the model Kongsstein, the flintware service Brunette and the stoneware service Finse. In addition to his work as a designer of tableware for households and the professional market, he created a series of vases, small objects of decorative art and reliefs in coloured stoneware for wall decoration.
