= Paradis Station =

Railway station in Stavanger, Norway

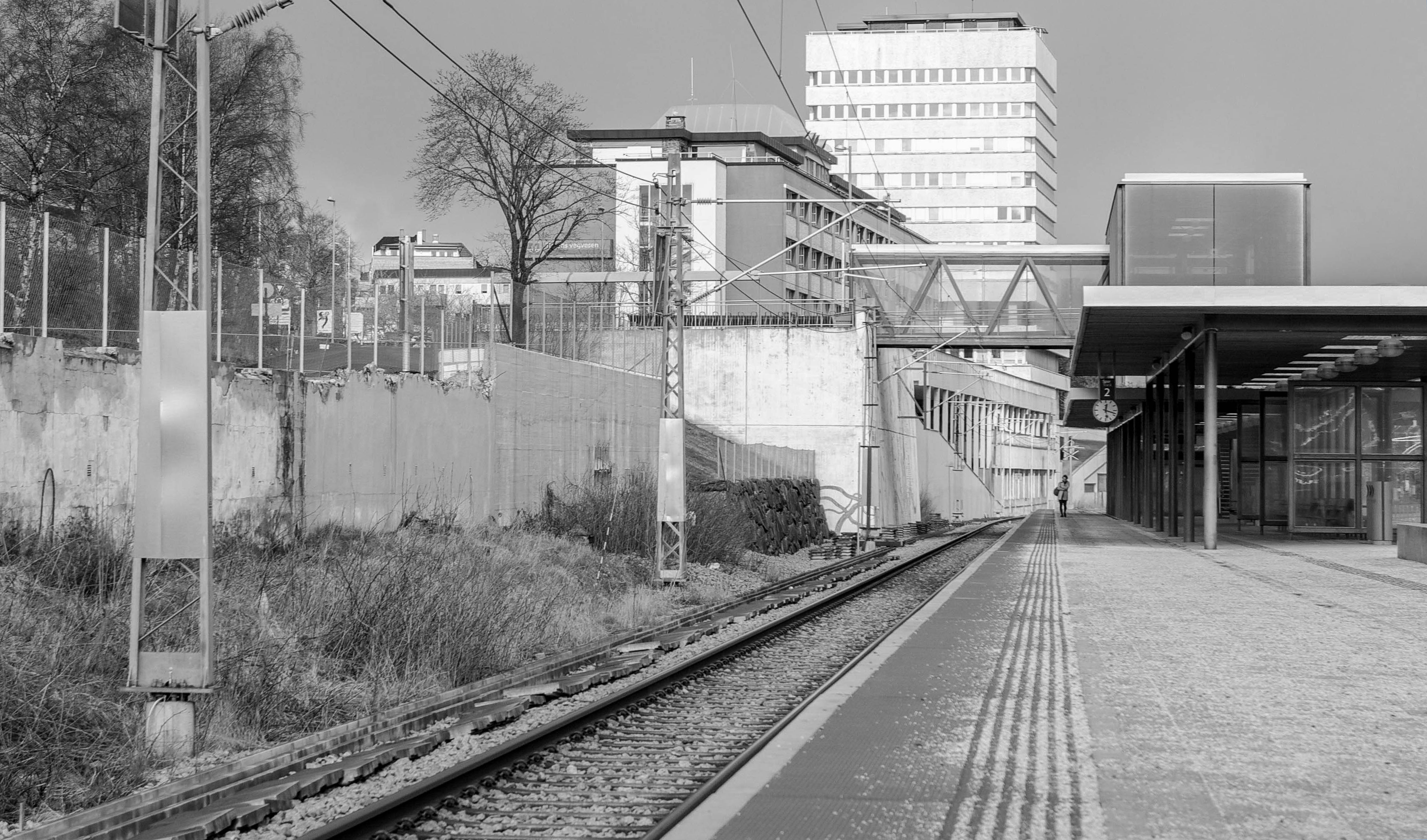

General information
- Location: Paradis, Stavanger; Norway
- Coordinates: 58.955851°N 5.741043°E
- Owner: Bane NOR
- Operator: Go-Ahead Norge
- Line: Sørlandet Line
- Distance: 597.3 km (371.1 mi)
- Platforms: 2
- Connections: Bus: Kolumbus routes 1, 2, 3, 4, 11, X30, X39, X44, X60, 66, X74, 75, E90

History
- Opened: 16 November 2009
Location

Paradis Station (Norwegian: Paradis holdeplass) is a railway station in Stavanger Municipality in Rogaland county, Norway. The station is located at Paradis in the city of Stavanger, about 1.4 kilometres (0.87 mi) from the main Stavanger Station. It is served by the Stavanger Commuter Rail operated by Go-Ahead Norge by up to four hourly trains in each direction. The station is located along the double track section of the Sørlandet Line, and was opened on 16 November 2009, replacing Hillevåg Station. It is co-located with a Kolumbus bus stop, allowing transfer to many routes.

== Facilities ==
The station is 597.3 kilometres (371.1 mi) from Oslo Central Station and 1.4 kilometres (0.87 mi) from Stavanger Station. Paradis Station is universally accessible, unstaffed and equipped with ticket machines. The station is located underneath Strøm Bridge, which feeds onto Norwegian National Road 44. The station serves the residential areas of Storhaug, Paradis and Våland. In addition, it is located within walking distance of the County Governor and Stavanger University Hospital. There is bicycle parking at the station, but no parking for cars. However, there is a kiss and ride area where people can be dropped from cars. Access to the station is available both from the north and the south, from both Strøm Bridge and Lagårdsveien, all with elevators.

== Service ==
The station is served by the Jæren Commuter Rail, operated by Go-Ahead. During regular operating hours on weekday, NSB operates four trains in each direction each hour. All northbound trains run to Stavanger Station, where they terminate. All four southbound trains operate to at least Sandnes Station, and two more continue to Nærbø Station and one runs to Egersund Station. Travel time to Stavanger is 2 minutes, to Sandnes Sentrum is 14 minutes, to Nærbø is 45 minutes and to Egersund is 1 hour and 5 minutes. NSB operates the line using Class 72 electric multiple units. Transfer to city bus is available 50 metres (160 ft) away at Strømsbrua on National Road 44, which serves Kolumbus' lines 1, 2, 3, 4, 11, X30, X39, X44, X60, 66, X74, 75 and E90.

== History ==
The line past Paradis was built as part of the Jæren Line and opened in 1878. The area was originally served by Hillevåg Station. In 2006 the Norwegian National Rail Administration started rebuilding the track between Stavanger and Sandnes to double track. As part of that, Hillevåg was closed and replaced by Paradis. The reason for moving the station is the new location will be developed into a commercial center with dense office, retail and housing real estate. The new line was opened on 16 November 2009 and from 14 December, the 15-minute headway was introduced between Stavanger and Sandnes.

Preceding station	Local trains	Following station
Stavanger Terminus	L5 Jæren Commuter Rail	Mariero towards Egersund
