= Gausel Station =

Railway station in Stavanger, Norway

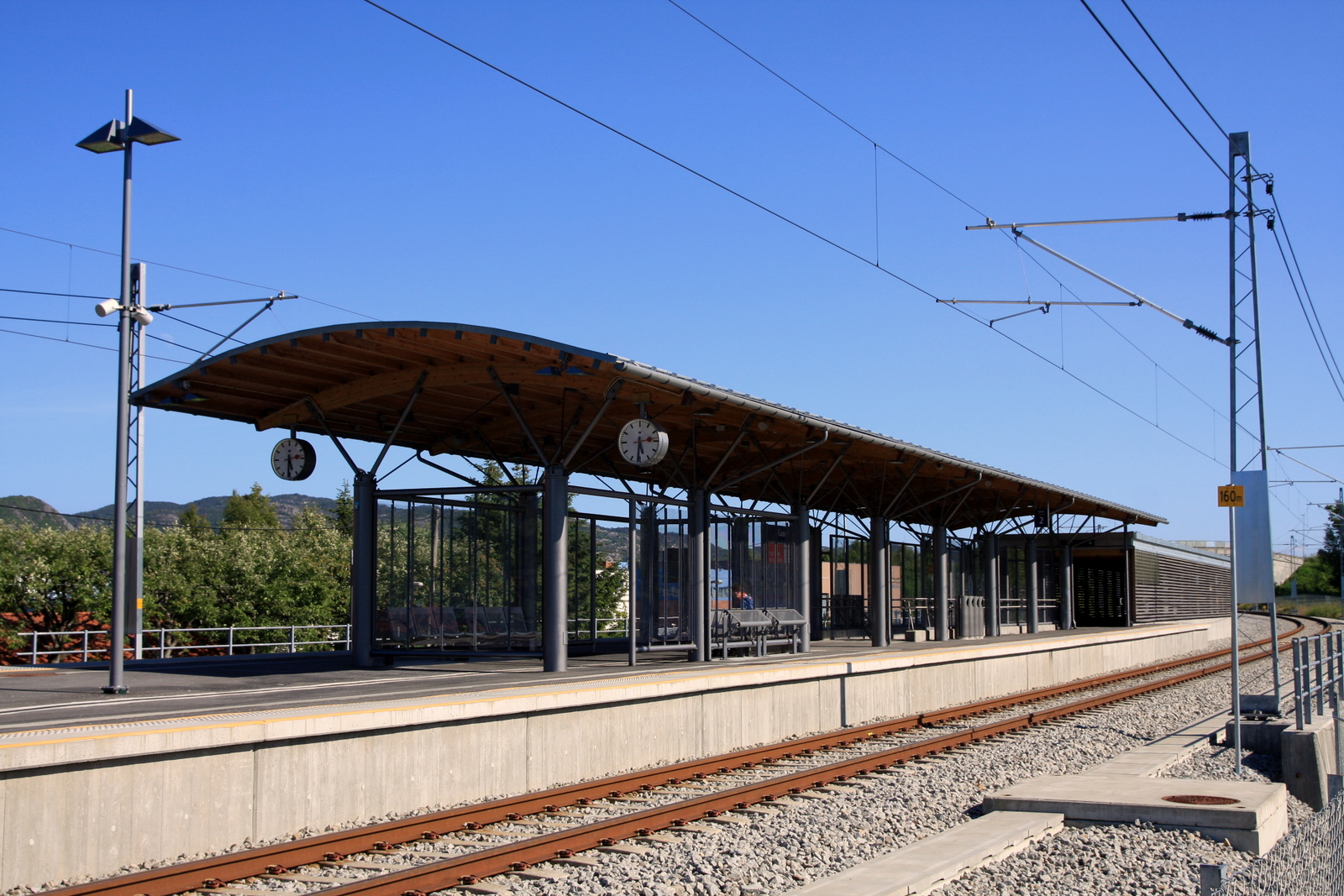

General information
- Location: Gausel, Stavanger; Norway
- Coordinates: 58.8992°N 5.7402°E
- Owner: Bane NOR
- Operator: Go-Ahead Norge
- Line: Sørlandet Line
- Distance: 589.75 km (366.45 mi)
- Platforms: 2
- Connections: Bus: Kolumbus lines 1, 2, 3, 6, 66, 67, 75

History
- Opened: 1902–1966; 2009–
Location

Gausel Station (Norwegian: Gausel holdeplass) is a railway station in Stavanger Municipality in Rogaland county, Norway. It is located at Gausel in the city of Stavanger. Located 9 kilometers (5.6 mi) from Stavanger Station, it is served by the Jæren Commuter Rail operated by Go-Ahead Norge by up to four hourly trains in each direction. The station is located along the double track section of the Sørlandet Line. The original station at Gausel was opened in 1902, and the station building was completed in 1908. This station was closed in 1966. The new station was opened on 16 November 2009 as part of the new double track from Stavanger to Sandnes. It is co-located with a Kolumbus bus stop, allowing transfer to several routes.

== Facilities ==
The station is 589.75 kilometers (366.45 mi) from Oslo Central Station and 9 kilometers (6 mi) from Stavanger Station. Gausel Station is universally accessible, unstaffed and equipped with ticket machines. There is parking for 50 cars. The station is located in a mixed commercial and residential area. The station's primary purpose is to act as a transport hub and interchange from the commuter rail to bus services towards Forus, an area with a high concentration of offices, Sola and Stavanger Airport, Sola.

== Service ==
The station is served by the Jæren Commuter Rail, operated by Go-Ahead. During regular operating hours on weekday, NSB operates four trains in each direction each hour. All northbound trains run to Stavanger Station, where they terminate. All four southbound trains operate to at least Sandnes Station, and two more continue to Nærbø Station and one runs to Egersund Station. Travel time to Stavanger is 11 minutes, to Sandnes Sentrum is 5 minutes, to Nærbø is 36 minutes and to Egersund is 56 minutes. NSB operates the line using Class 72 electric multiple units. Transfer to city bus is available 30 metres (98 ft) away on National Road 44, which serves Kolumbus' lines 1, 2, 3, 6, 66, 67 and 75.

== History ==
The original station was opened as a halt on 1 November 1904. The station building was completed in 1908. From 1 December 1918, Gausel was upgraded to a station. From 2 June 1957 the line became subject to centralized traffic control and the station unstaffed. The station was closed in 1966. In 2006, the Norwegian National Rail Administration started rebuilding the track between Stavanger and Sandnes to double track, and decided to build a new station at Gausel. The new line 16 November 2009, and from 14 December, the 15-minute headway was introduced between Stavanger and Sandnes, including stops at Gausel.

| Preceding station | Local trains | Following station |
|---|---|---|
| Jåttåvågen towards Stavanger | L5 Jæren Commuter Rail | Sandnes Sentrum towards Egersund |
