= Varhaug Station =

Railway station in Hå, Norway

Varhaug
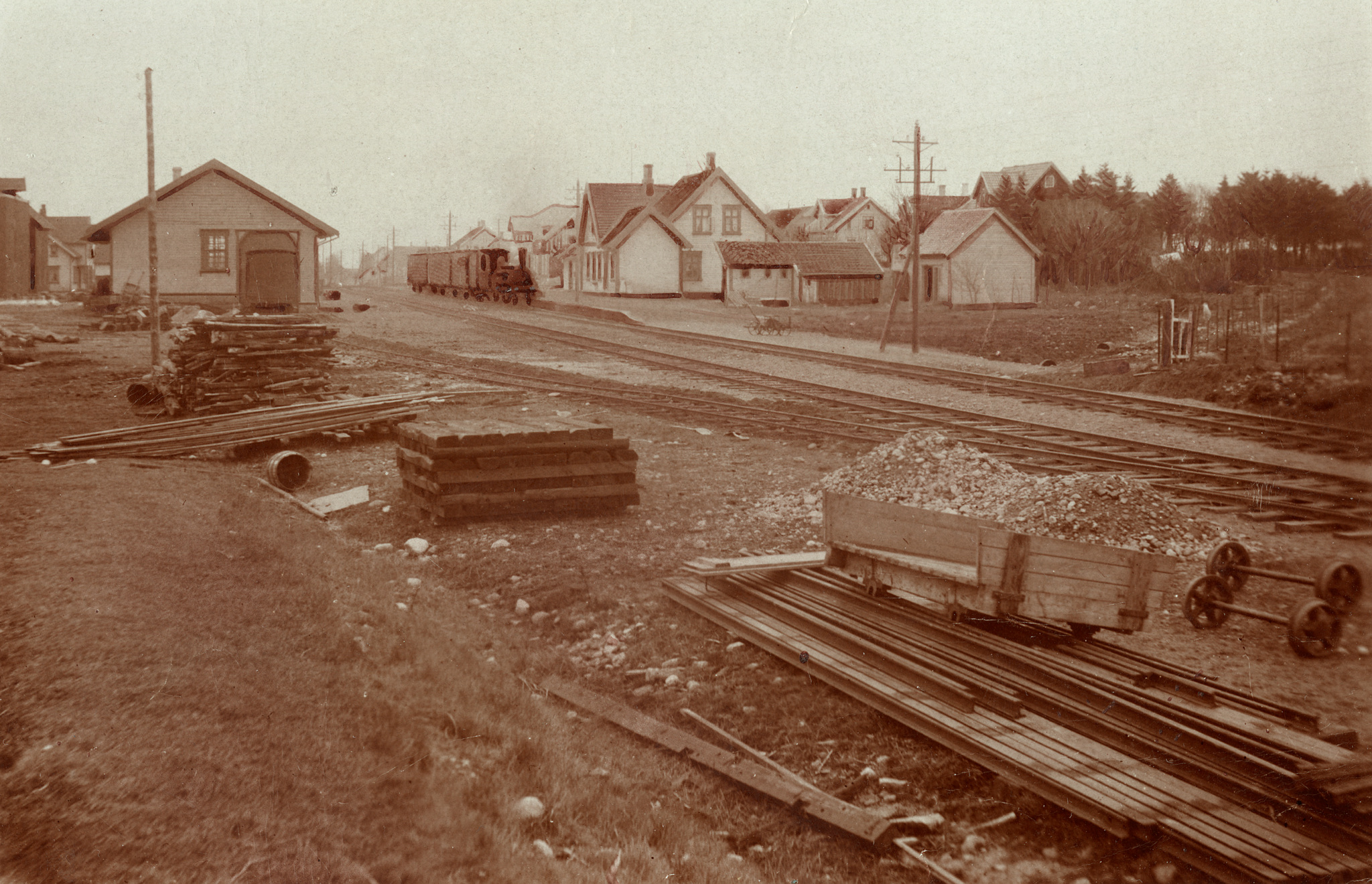

General information
- Location: Varhaug, Hå Municipality; Norway
- Coordinates: 58.618°N 5.646°E
- Elevation: 44.3 m (145 ft)
- Owner: Norwegian National Rail Administration
- Operator: Go-Ahead Norge
- Line: Sørlandet Line
- Distance: 555.77 km (345.34 mi)
- Platforms: 1
- Connections: Bus: Kolumbus

History
- Opened: 1878
Location

Varhaug Station (Norwegian: Varhaug stasjon) is a railway station located on the Sørland Line at Varhaug in Hå Municipality, Norway. The station is served by the Jæren Commuter Rail between Stavanger and Egersund. The station is 43.11 kilometres (26.79 mi) south of the city of Stavanger. Prior to 1907, the name was spelled Varhoug.

Preceding station	Local trains	Following station
Nærbø towards Stavanger	L5 Jæren Commuter Rail	Vigrestad towards Egersund
