= Bryne Station =

Railway station in Time, Norway

Bryne Station Bryne stasjon
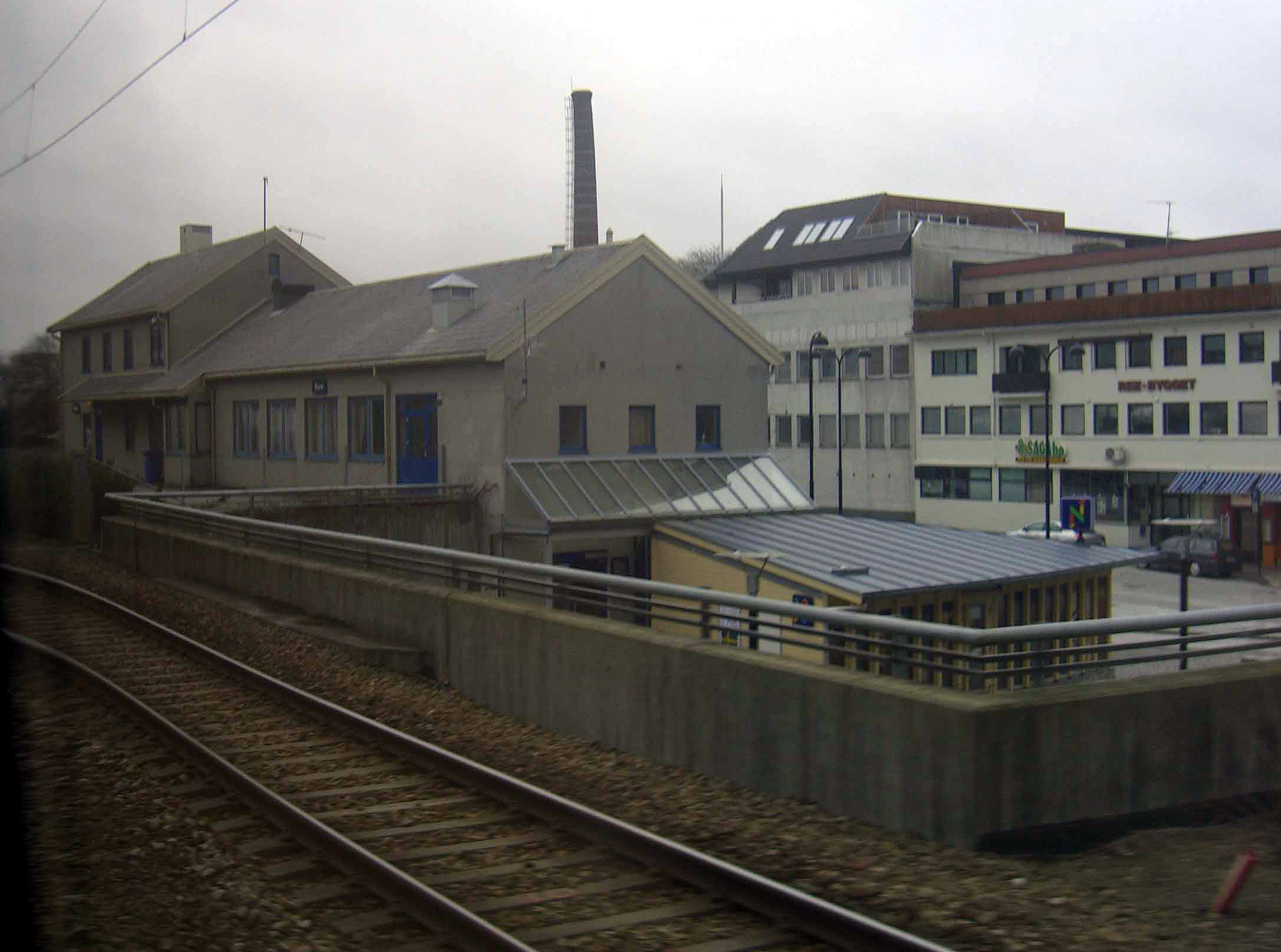

General information
- Location: Bryne, Time Municipality; Rogaland; Norway
- Coordinates: 58°44′2″N 5°38′57″E
- Elevation: 30.4 m (100 ft)
- System: Railway station
- Owner: Bane NOR
- Operator: Go-Ahead Norge
- Line: Sørlandet Line
- Distance: 569.30 km (353.75 mi)
- Platforms: 2
- Connections: Bus: Kolumbus

Construction
- Parking: 150 parking spaces

Other information
- Station code: BRY

History
- Opened: 1878
Location

Bryne Station (Norwegian: Bryne stasjon) is a railway station in the town of Bryne in Time Municipality in Rogaland county, Norway. The station is located along the Sørlandet Line and it is served by the Jæren Commuter Rail between Stavanger and Egersund as well as regional trains between Stavanger and Kristiansand. The station is located 29.58 kilometres (18.38 mi) south of the city of Stavanger. The station has a staffed ticket window during weekdays. It also has vending machines for food and drink.

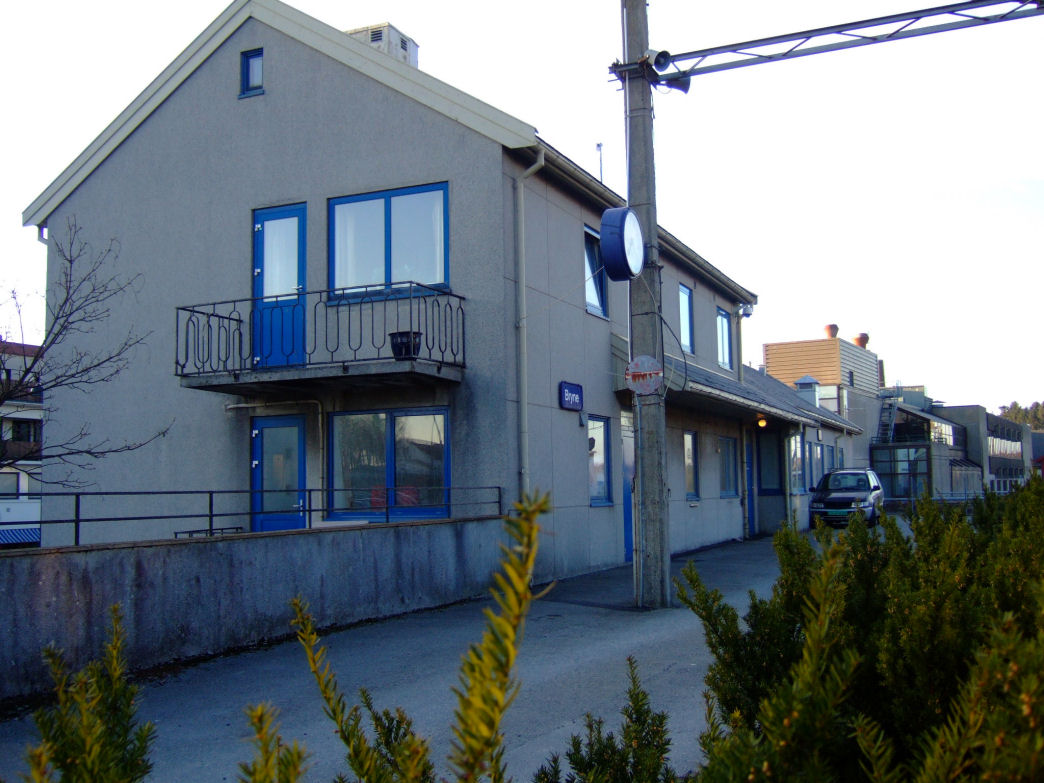
View of the station

== History ==
The station was first opened in 1878 as Thime station. Around the year 1883, the spelling was changed to Time. On 1 February 1921, the station was renamed Bryne station.

Preceding station	Express trains	Following station
Sandnes Sentrum towards Stavanger	F5	Egersund towards Oslo S
Preceding station	Local trains	Following station
Klepp towards Stavanger	L5 Jæren Commuter Rail	Nærbø towards Egersund
