= Nærbø (disambiguation) =

Nærbø is a village in Hå municipality in Rogaland county, Norway.

Nærbø may also refer to:

== Places ==
- Nærbø (municipality), a former municipality in Rogaland county, Norway
- Nærbø Church, a church in Hå municipality in Rogaland county, Norway
- Old Nærbø Church, a church in Hå municipality in Rogaland county, Norway
- Nærbø Station, a railway station in Hå municipality in Rogaland county, Norway
