= Sandnes Sentrum Station =

Railway station in Sandnes, Norway

Sandnes Central Station
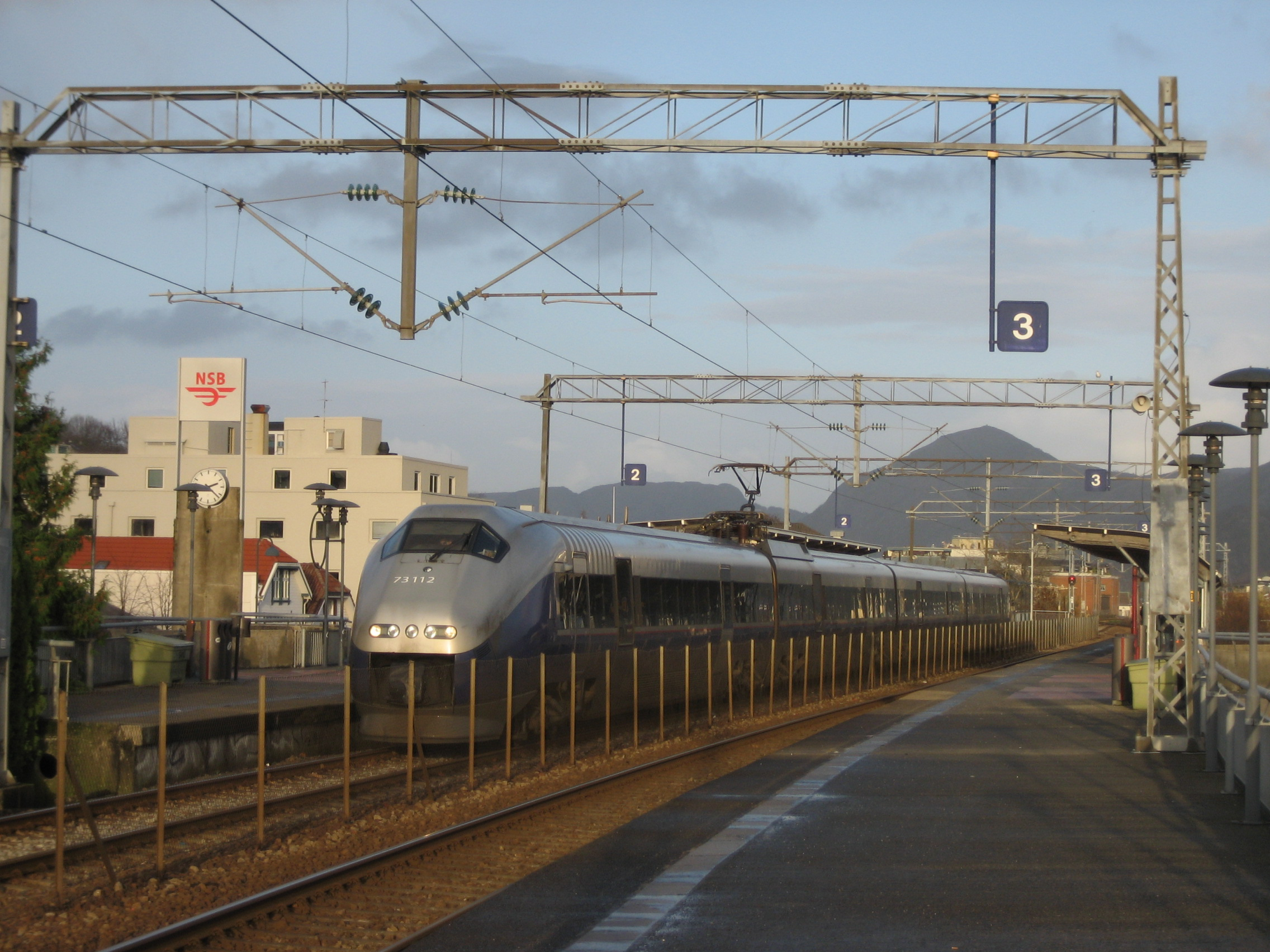
- An NSB Class 73 express train at Sandnes.

General information
- Location: Downtown, Sandnes; Norway
- Coordinates: 58°51′9″N 5°44′10″E
- Elevation: 6.1 m (20 ft)
- Owner: Bane NOR
- Operator: Go-Ahead Norge
- Line: Sørlandet Line
- Distance: 583.45 km (362.54 mi)
- Connections: Bus: Kolumbus

Other information
- Station code: SAS
Location

Sandnes Sentrum Station (Norwegian: Sandnes sentrum stasjon) is a railway station in the city of Sandnes which lies in the western part of Sandnes Municipality in Rogaland county, Norway. The station is located in the downtown, harbour area of the city of Sandnes (in the borough of Trones og Sentrum). The station is served by regional trains to Kristiansand and Stavanger along the Sørlandet Line and by local trains on the Jæren Commuter Rail network from Stavanger Station to Egersund Station. This station is located 14.78 kilometres (9.18 mi) south of Stavanger Station. The station has a waiting room, ticket machines, and food kiosks, but few other services.

== History ==
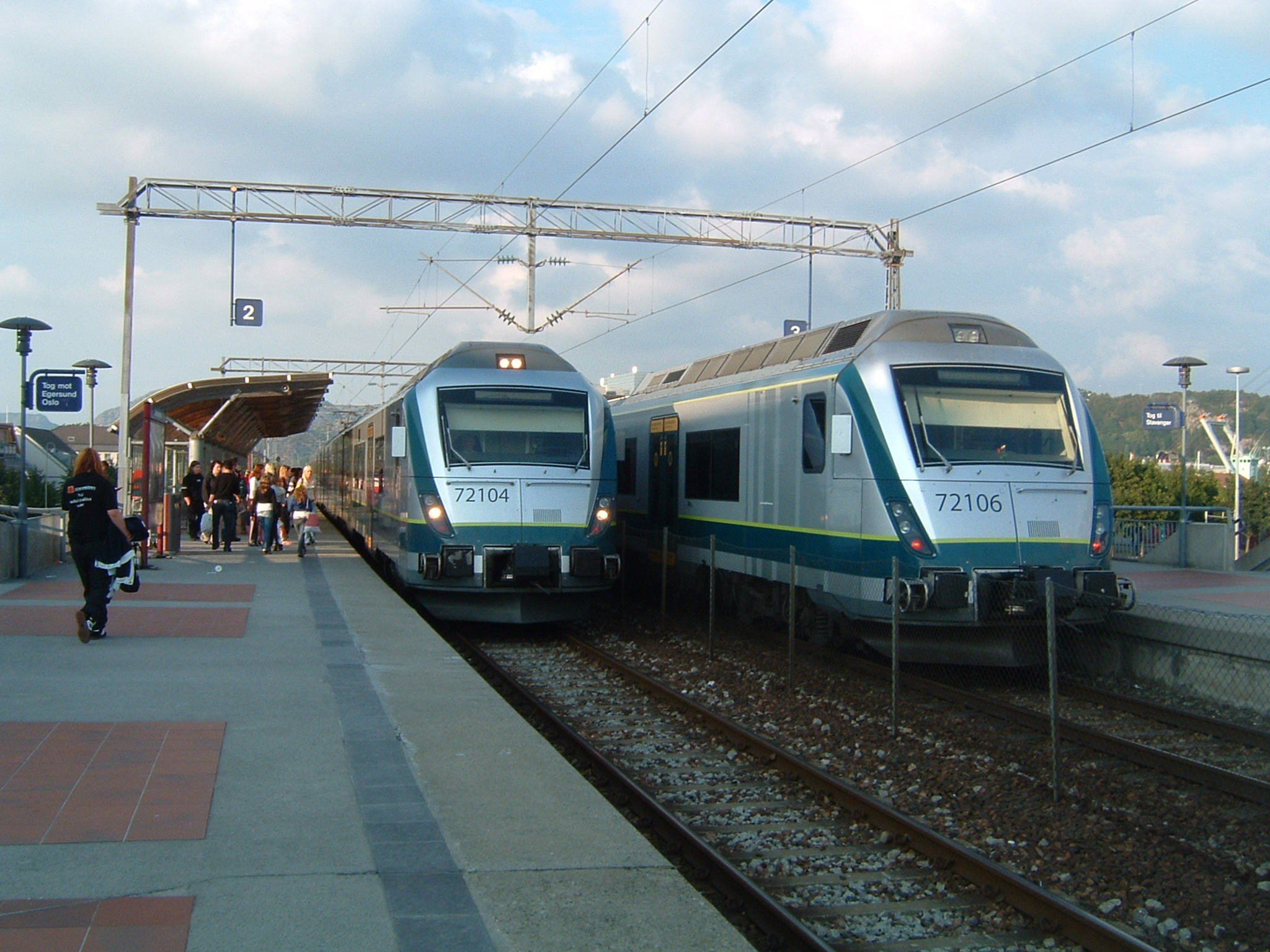
Two NSB Class 72 commuter trains meeting at Sandnes.

The original station for Sandnes, Sandnes Station, was opened with the Jæren Line in 1878. The new Sandnes Sentrum station in the center of Sandnes was completed in 1992, and the old station converted to a stop for only regional trains.

| Preceding station | Express trains | Following station |
|---|---|---|
| Stavanger Terminus | F5 | Bryne towards Oslo S |
| Preceding station | Local trains | Following station |
| Gausel towards Stavanger | L5 Jæren Commuter Rail | Sandnes towards Egersund |
