= Varden Church =

Church in Rogaland, Norway

- Varden kirke
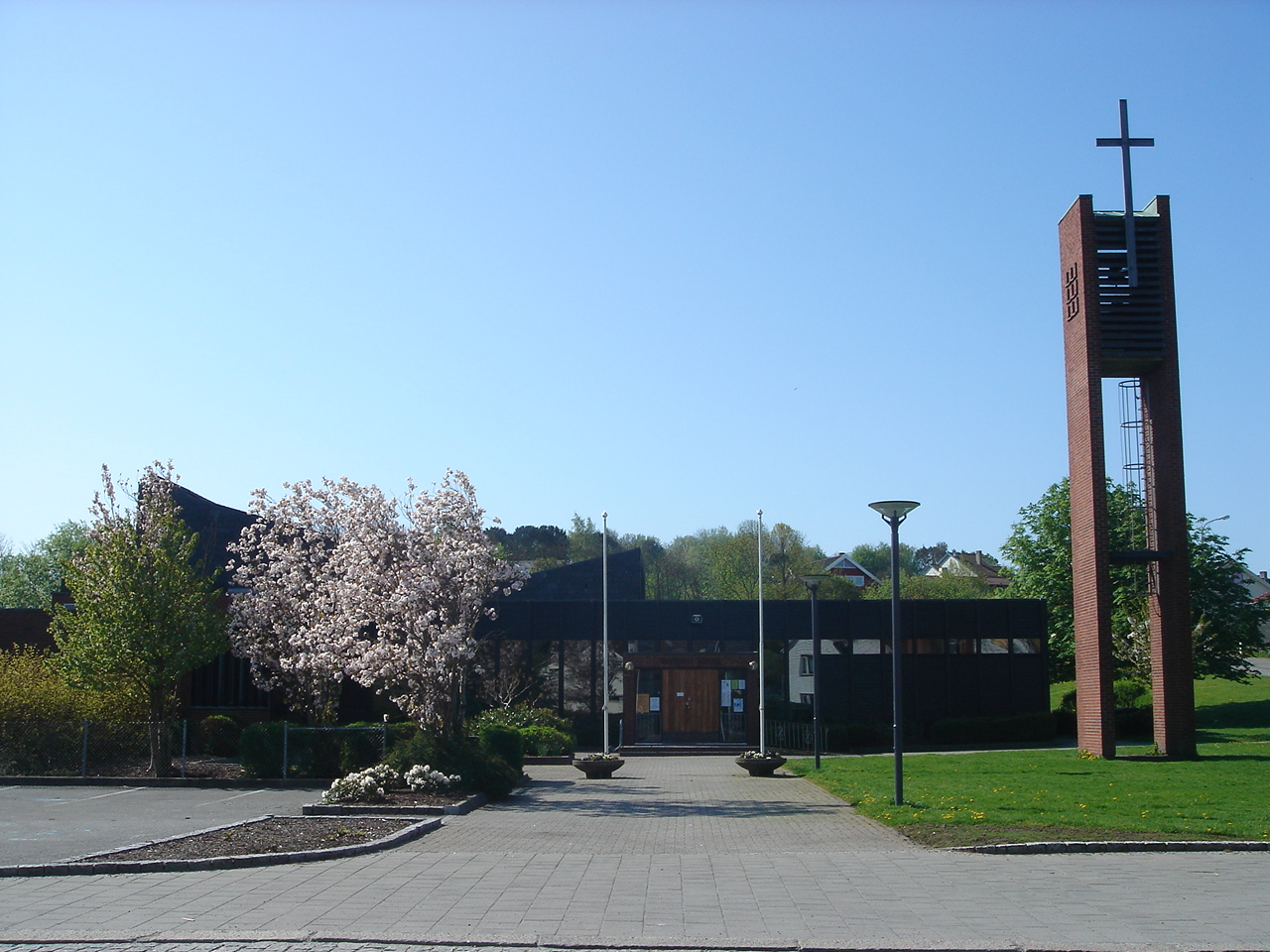
- View of the church
- Varden Church
- 58.959397°N 5.751091°E
- Location: Stavanger Municipality, Rogaland
- Country: Norway
- Denomination: Church of Norway
- Churchmanship: Evangelical Lutheran

History
- Status: Parish church
- Founded: 1967
- Consecrated: 1967

Architecture
- Functional status: Active
- Architect(s): Jan Jæger and Per Faltinsen
- Architectural type: Rectangular
- Completed: 1967 (59 years ago)

Specifications
- Capacity: 430
- Materials: Brick

Administration
- Diocese: Stavanger bispedømme
- Deanery: Stavanger domprosti
- Parish: Varden
- Norwegian Cultural Heritage Site
- Type: Church
- Status: Not protected
- ID: 85770

Varden Church (Norwegian: Varden kirke) is a parish church of the Church of Norway in Stavanger Municipality, Rogaland county, Norway. It is located in Varden, within the borough of Storhaug in the city of Stavanger. Serving as the church for the Varden parish, it falls under the Stavanger domprosti (arch-deanery) in the Diocese of Stavanger. The red brick church was built in a rectangular design in 1967, using designs by the architects Jan Jæger and Per Faltinsen. The church seats about 430 people.

== See also ==
- List of churches in Rogaland
