= Storekvina station =

Railway station in Kvinesdal, Norway

Storekvina
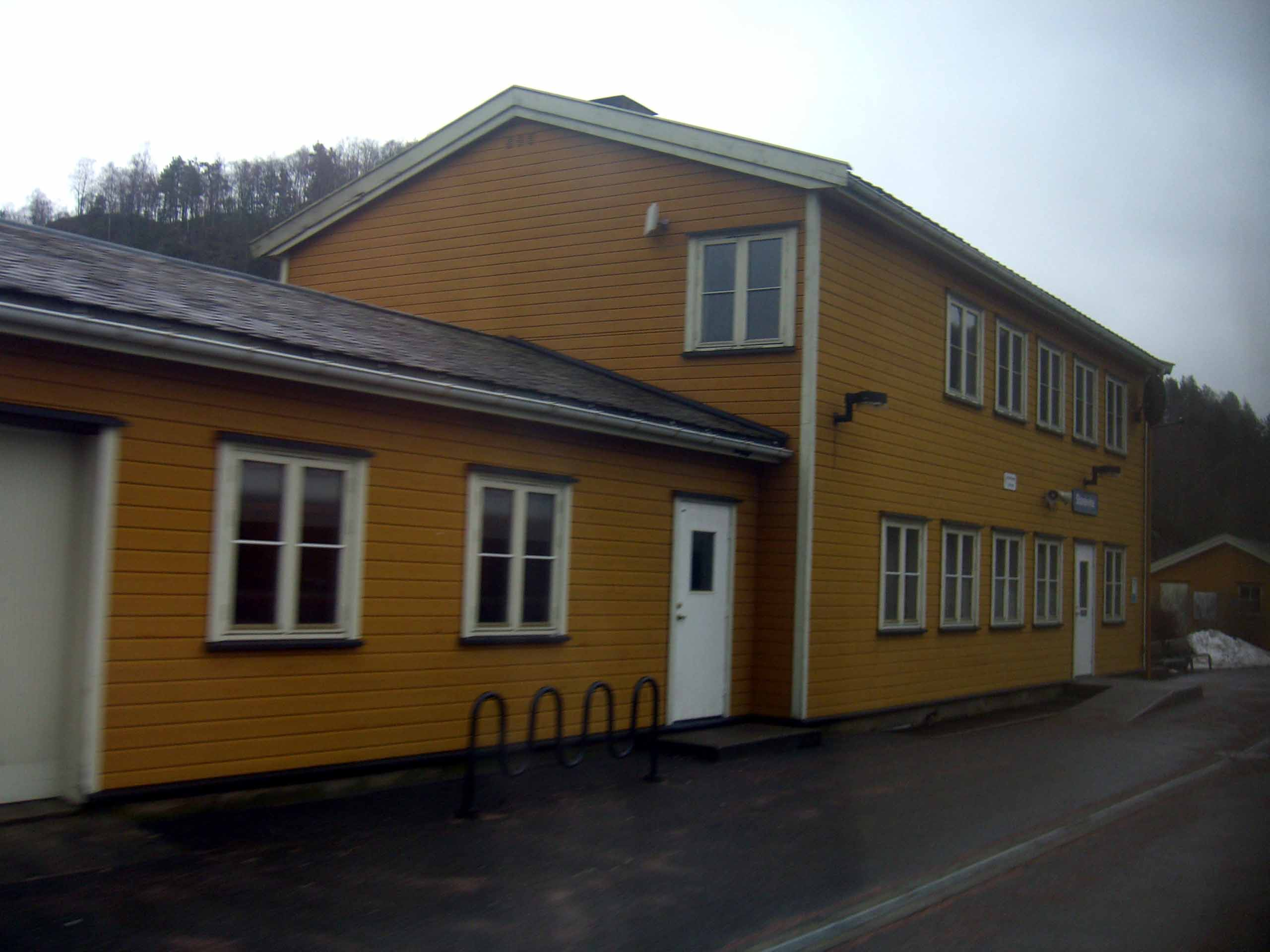

General information
- Location: Storekvina, Kvinesdal Municipality; Norway
- Coordinates: 58°22′50″N 6°57′22″E
- Elevation: 135.9 m (446 ft) AMSL
- Owner: Bane NOR
- Operator: Go-Ahead Norge
- Line: Sørlandet Line
- Distance: 446.36 km (277.36 mi)
- Platforms: 1
- Tracks: 1

Construction
- Accessible: No
- Architect: Gudmund Hoel

History
- Opened: 17 December 1943

Passengers
- 2008: 32,100 (annually)
Location
- Location within Agder

Storekvina station (Norwegian: Storekvina stasjon) is a railway station on the Sørlandet Line situated at Storekvina in Kvinesdal Municipality, Norway. Located 446.36 kilometers (277.36 mi) from Oslo Central Station, it is served by long-distance trains operated by Go-Ahead Norge. In addition to intercity services to Oslo and Stavanger, the eight daily trains in each direction serve as a commuter link to Kristiansand, located an hour away.

The station was opened on 17 December 1943 as part of the segment of the Sørlandet Line between Kristiasand and Sira. The line past the station was electrified from 18 February 1944. It received a station building designed by Gudmund Hoel. Although previously possessing a passing loop, the station was bypassed in the automatic train control installation in 1969. The side tracks have since been removed and the station has been unstaffed since 1986. Storekvina had 32,100 passengers in 2008.

== History ==
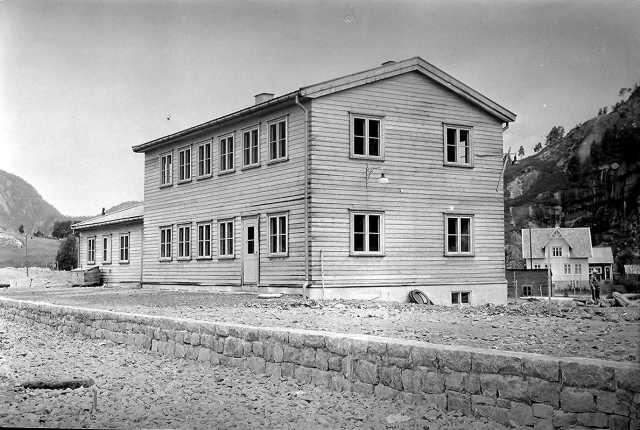
The station nearing completion in July 1942

Storekvina Station was built during the Second World War under the German-administrated expansion of the Sørlandet Line west of Kristiansand. The station building was completed in 1942 after designs by Gudmund Hoel at NSB Arkitektkontor. It was originally proposed to be named Stor-Kvina, but this was changed to Storekvina. Irregular revenue traffic commenced on the line on 17 December 1943 and the station became operative from the same day. Electric traction was introduced on 18 February 1944, ahead of ordinary traffic commencing on 1 March 1944.

The Sørlandet Line received automatic train control from 1969. Storekvina never received an interlocking system and the former passing loop was officially taken out of use from 1 June 1969. The station remained staffed for sale of tickets and handling cargo until 1 June 1986.

== Facilities ==
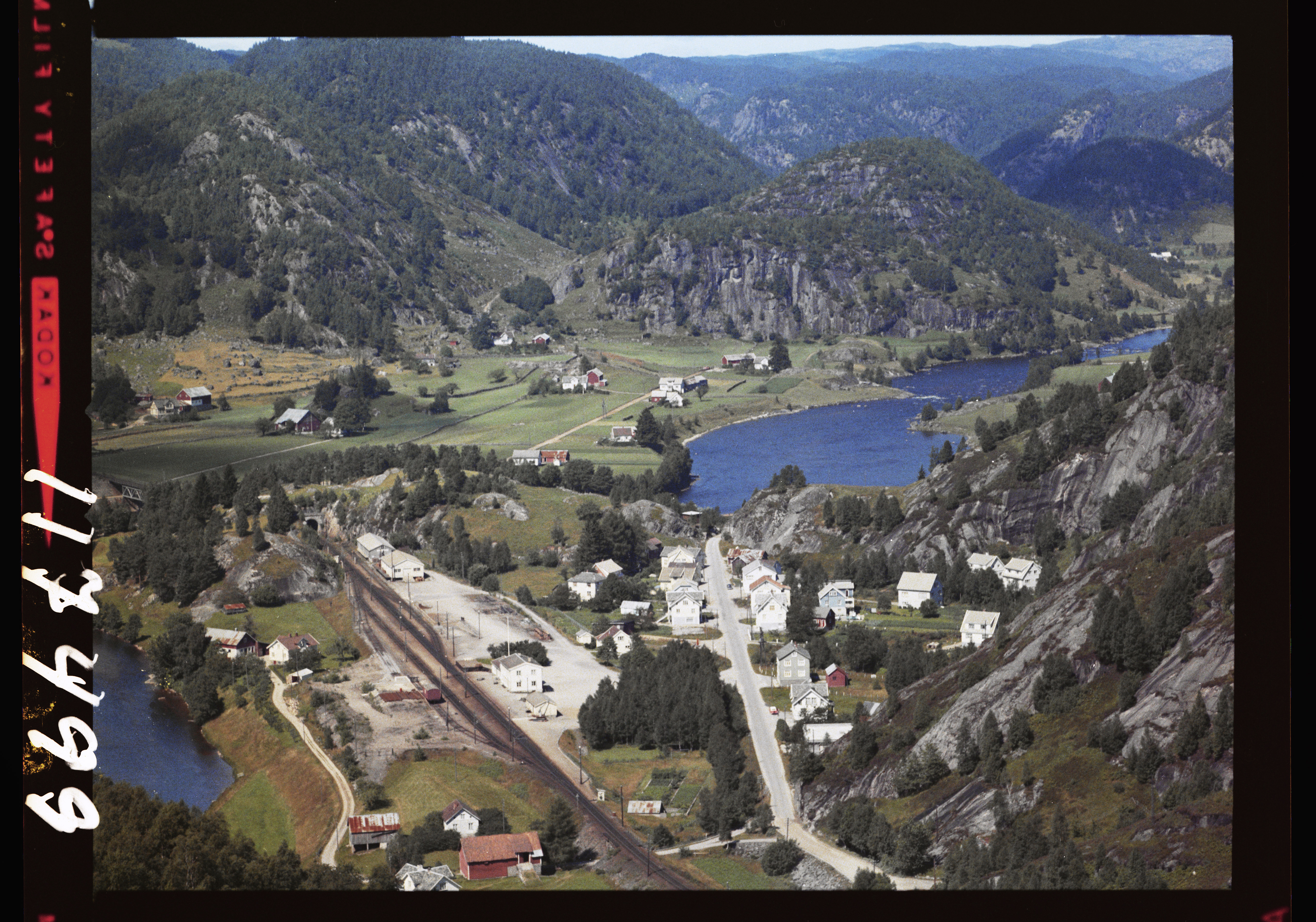
Aerial view of the station in 1963

Storekvina Station is a station on the Sørlandet Line, located 446.36 kilometers (277.36 mi) from Oslo Central Station at an elevation of 135.9 meters (446 ft) above mean sea level. The station is located just west of the 5,717-meter (3.552 mi) Gyland Tunnel, which runs almost the entire distance to Gyland Station. The station no longer features any passing loops, and consists of a single track and a single platform, the latter 175 meters (574 ft) long and 50 centimeters (20 in) high.

Like the other stations along the Sørlandet Line, the station building received a standardized design. It was built in the overall Neoclassical architecture style adapted in the 1920s. By the 1940s the designs had been altered to include elements of Functionalism. The station building, designed by Gudmund Hoel, was identical to the one at Audnedal Station. The 180 square meters (1,900 sq ft) building is wooden with a concrete foundation. It has siding in wood and a gable roof. The building consists of a main section, where the lower story originally featured a ticketing and waiting room, and an upper story with the station master's residence. The annex was allocated cargo handling.

Today the station building features a waiting room and washrooms, open around the clock except from 21:00 on Saturday to 07:00 on Sunday. There is free parking for 30 cars at the station, as well as parking facilities for bicycles.

== Services ==
The station is served by long-distance trains operated by Go-Ahead, counting eight daily services on weekdays, including a night train service. These operate from Oslo via Kristiansand to Stavanger. Travel time is about one hour to Kristiansand, two hours to Stavanger and less than five hours to Oslo.

The station had 32,100 annual passengers in 2008. The catchment area of Storekvina Station covers Kvinesdal Municipality and Farsund Municipality. The station is situated north of village of Liknes. Agder Kollektivtrafikk operates a shuttle service to the village in connection with the train services. This must be ordered at least two hours in advance.

Preceding station	Express trains	Following station
Gyland towards Stavanger	F5	Snartemo towards Oslo S
