= Varden, Stavanger =

Neighborhood in Stavanger, Norway

Coordinates: 58°57′25″N 5°45′04″E

Varden is a neighborhood (delområde) in the city of Stavanger which lies in the southwestern part of the large municipality of Stavanger in Rogaland county, Norway. It is located in the southern part of the borough of Storhaug, southeast of Paradis. The neighborhood has a population of 3,917 which is distributed over an area of 1.5 square kilometres (370 acres). Varden Church is located in this neighborhood.
