= Nylund =

Neighborhood in Stavanger, Norway

Coordinates: 58°57′53″N 5°45′01″E

Nylund is a neighborhood (delområde) in the city of Stavanger which lies in the southwestern part of the large municipality of Stavanger in Rogaland county, Norway. It is located in the borough of Storhaug, between the neighborhoods of Johannes and Paradis. The neighborhood has a population of 2,025 which is distributed over an area of 0.39 square kilometres (96 acres).
