= St. Johannes Church (Stavanger) =

Church in Rogaland, Norway

- Saint John's Church; Sankt Johannes kirke
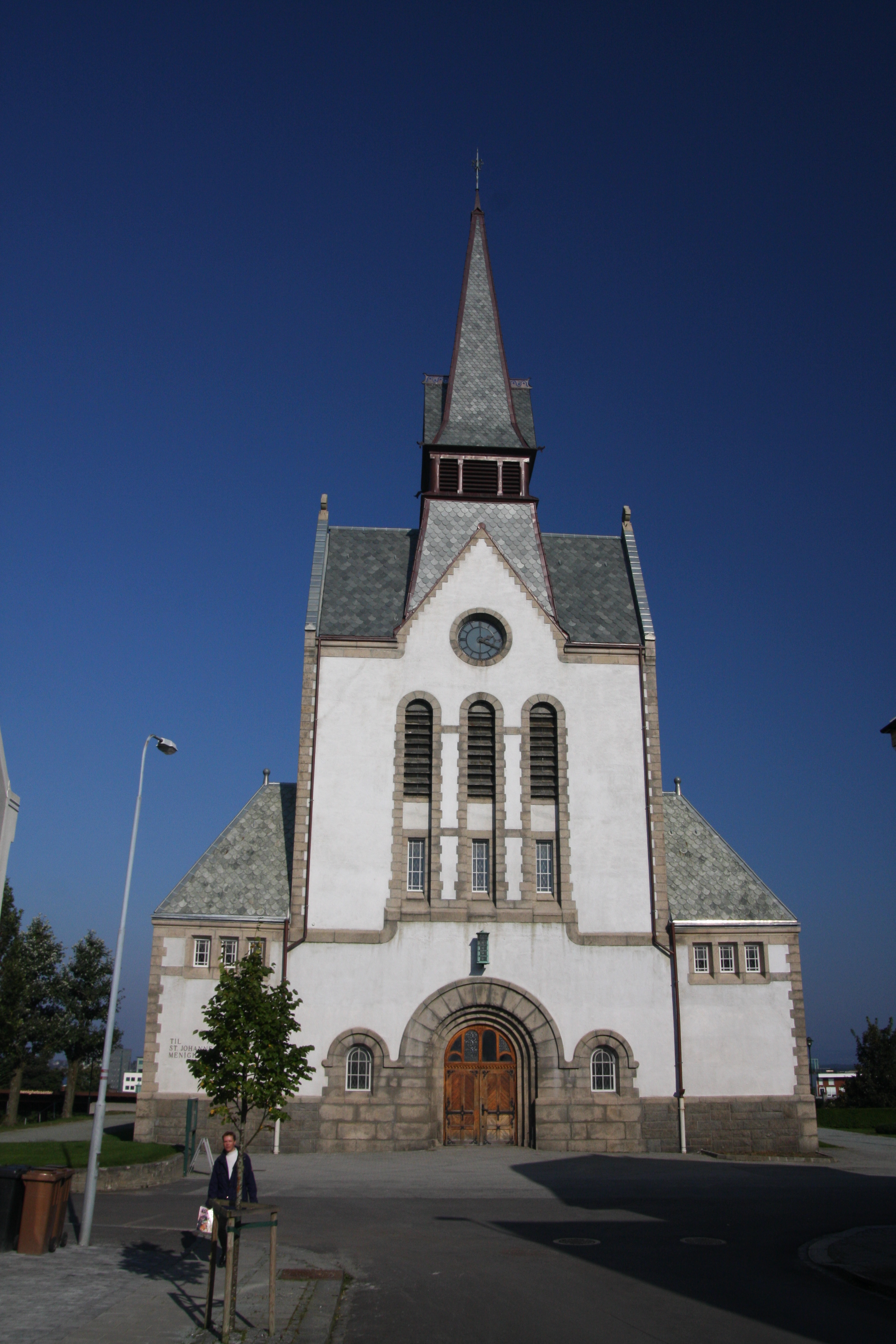
- View of the church
- St. Johannes Church
- 58.968697°N 5.749103°E
- Location: Stavanger Municipality, Rogaland
- Country: Norway
- Denomination: Church of Norway
- Churchmanship: Evangelical Lutheran

History
- Status: Parish church
- Founded: 1909
- Consecrated: 1909

Architecture
- Functional status: Active
- Architect: Hans Jacob Sparre
- Architectural type: Long church
- Completed: 1909 (117 years ago)

Specifications
- Capacity: 700
- Materials: Plastered brick

Administration
- Diocese: Stavanger bispedømme
- Deanery: Stavanger domprosti
- Parish: St. Johannes
- Norwegian Cultural Heritage Site
- Type: Church
- Status: Protected
- ID: 85535

St. Johannes Church (Norwegian: St. Johannes kirke) is a parish church of the Church of Norway in Stavanger Municipality in Rogaland county, Norway. It is located in the Johannes neighborhood in the borough of Storhaug in the centre of the city of Stavanger. It is one of the two churches for the St. Johannes parish which is part of the Stavanger domprosti (arch-deanery) in the Diocese of Stavanger. The white, plastered brick church was built in a long church style in 1909 using designs by the architect Hans Jacob Sparre. The church seats about 700 people.

== See also ==
- List of churches in Rogaland
