= Gyland Station =

Railway station in Flekkefjord, Norway

Gyland
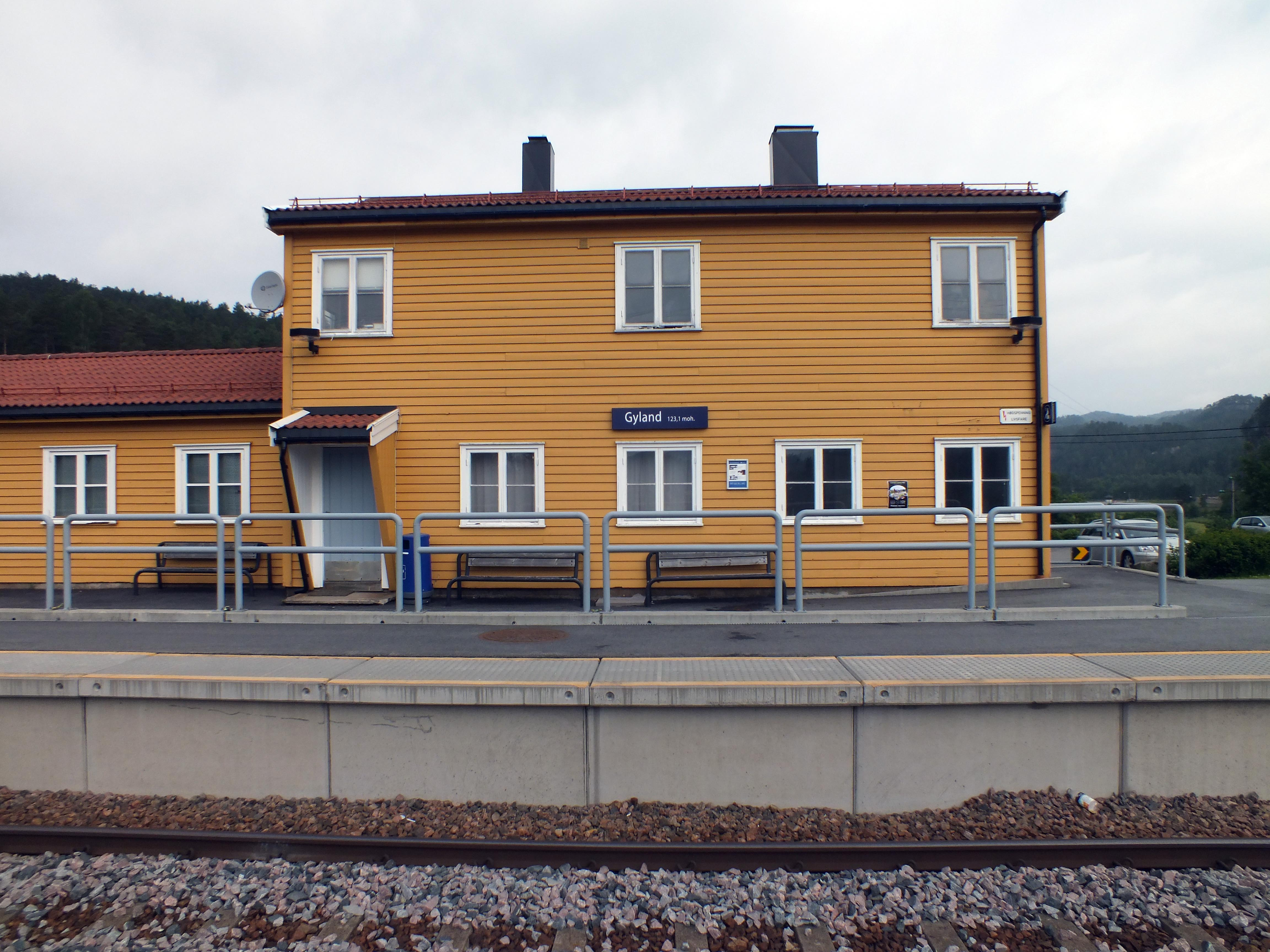

General information
- Location: Gyland, Flekkefjord Municipality; Norway
- Coordinates: 58°23′3.74″N 6°50′14.49″E
- Elevation: 123.1 m (404 ft) AMSL
- Owner: Bane NOR
- Operator: Go-Ahead Norge
- Line: Sørlandet Line
- Distance: 453.53 km (281.81 mi)

Construction
- Parking: 30 spaces
- Accessible: Yes

Other information
- Station code: GYL

History
- Opened: 17 December 1943

Passengers
- 2008: 13,800
Location

Gyland Station (Norwegian: Gyland stasjon) is a railway station of the Sørlandet Line situated at Gyland in Flekkefjord Municipality, Norway. Located 453.53 kilometers (281.81 mi) from Oslo Central Station, it is served by long-distance trains operated by Go-Ahead Norge. In addition to intercity services to Oslo and Stavanger, the eight daily trains in each direction serve as a commuter link to Kristiansand, located 70 minutes away.

The station was opened on 17 December 1943 as part of the segment of the Sørlandet Line between Kristiansand and Sira. The line past the station was electrified from 18 February 1944. It received a station building designed by Gudmund Hoel. The station received centralized traffic control in 1969 and has been unstaffed since 1986. Gyland served 13,800 passengers in 2008.

== History ==
Gyland Station was built during the Second World War under the German-administrated expansion of the Sørlandet Line west of Kristiansand. It was originally proposed to be named Storeness, but this was changed to Gyland by the time the station opened in 1943. It served what was then the municipality of Gyland. Irregular revenue traffic commenced on the line on 17 December 1943 and the station became operative from the same day. Electric traction was introduced on 18 February 1944, ahead of ordinary traffic commencing on 1 March 1944.

The cargo annex was extended in 1950. An interlocking system became operational on 10 June 1969, allowing the station to become remotely controlled from 19 August 1969. The station became unstaffed from 1 June 1986.

The short platforms have caused the Norwegian Railway Authority to demand that they be lengthened with 2019, or the station closed. The National Rail Administration determined in 2009 that Gyland would be one of eighteen prioritized stations which would have their platforms lengthened and heightened the same year. The work was completed in early 2010.

== Facilitates ==
Gyland Station is a station on the Sørlandet Line, located 453.53 kilometers (281.81 mi) from Oslo Central Station at an elevation of 123.1 meters (404 ft) above mean sea level. The station is located just east of the 5,717-meter (3.552 mi) Gyland Tunnel, which runs almost the entire distance to Storekvina Station. To the west is the 932-meter (3,058 ft) Fedog Tunnel. Although originally featuring four tracks, the station now consist of a 312-meter (1,024 ft) passing loop. Trains normally stop at the main side platform, which is 220 meters (720 ft) and 76 centimeters (30 in) tall. Track 2 is served by an island platform which measures 87 meters (285 ft) in length and 50 centimeters (20 in) in height.

The station building designed by Gudmund Hoel and Bjarne F. Baastad at NSB Arkitektkontor. Like the other stations along the Sørlandet Line, the station building received a standardized design. It was built in the overall Neoclassical architecture style adapted in the 1920s. By the 1940s the designs had been altered to include elements of functionalism. The 150 square meters (1,600 sq ft) main building is wooden with a concrete foundation. It has siding in wood and a gable roof. The building consists of a main section, where the lower story originally featured a ticketing and waiting room, and an upper story with the station master's residence. The annex was allocated cargo handling.

Today the station building features a waiting room and washrooms, open around the clock except from 21:00 on Saturday to 07:00 on Sunday. There is free parking for 30 cars at the station, as well as parking facilities for bicycles.

== Services ==
The station is served by long-distance trains operated by Go-Ahead, counting eight daily services on weekdays, including a night train service. These operate from Oslo via Kristiansand to Stavanger. The station had 13,800 annual passengers in 2008.

Preceding station	Express trains	Following station
Sira towards Stavanger	F5	Storekvina towards Oslo S
