= Kumlevollvatnet =

Lake in Agder, Norway

Kumlevollvatnet Kongevollvatnet
- Interactive map of the lake
- Location: Flekkefjord Municipality, Agder
- Coordinates: 58.35909°N 6.82408°E
- Primary inflows: Gylandelva river
- Primary outflows: Fedaelva river
- Basin countries: Norway
- Max. length: 3.5 kilometres (2.2 mi)
- Max. width: 2 kilometres (1.2 mi)
- Surface area: 3.12 km^{2} (1.20 sq mi)
- Shore length^{1}: 18.23 kilometres (11.33 mi)
- Surface elevation: 111 metres (364 ft)
- References: NVE
- ^{1} Shore length is not a well-defined measure.

Kumlevollvatnet or Kongevollvatnet is a lake in Flekkefjord Municipality in Agder county, Norway. The 3.12-square-kilometre (1.20 sq mi) lake lies along the river Fedaelva, just south of the village of Gyland and about 12 kilometres (7.5 mi) northeast of the town of Flekkefjord.

== See also ==
- List of lakes in Norway
