= Hillevåg Station =

Railway station in Stavanger, Norway

Hillevåg

General information
- Location: Hillevåg, Stavanger; Norway
- Coordinates: 58.94854°N 5.74627°E
- Owner: Norwegian National Rail Administration
- Line: Sørlandet Line
- Distance: 596.44 kilometres (370.61 mi)
- Platforms: 1

History
- Opened: 1880
- Closed: 2009
Location

Hillevåg Station (Norwegian: Hillevåg holdeplass) was a railway station located in the city of Stavanger in the municipality of Stavanger in Rogaland county, Norway. It was closed in 2009, and replaced by Paradis Station. The station was served by the Jæren Commuter Rail between Stavanger and Egersund. The station was located 2 kilometres (1.2 mi) south of the city centre of Stavanger and used to have service every half hour.
