= Roinestad =

Hamlet in Agder, Norway

Coordinates: 58.38398°N 6.94872°E

Roinestad (Norwegian: Røynestad) is a hamlet of Kvinesdal Municipality in Agder county, Norway.

== Geography ==
Røynestad is located on the river Kvina, about 7 kilometres (4.3 mi) north of the village of Liknes. It is contiguous with the village of Storekvina to the east. Røinestad is located 135 metres (443 ft) above sea level.

== Surname ==
As typical in Norwegian tradition, persons who inhabited that area known as "Roinestad" in Kvinesdal adopted the name as their family (last) name. While Roinestad (sometimes spelled "Roynestad") is not a common name, there are some Norwegian and United States residents with this name. Most notably Brooklyn, New York has a relatively high concentration of Roinestads who migrated from Kvinesdal at various times.
