= Bergjeland =

Neighborhood of Stavanger, Norway

Coordinates: 58°58′12″N 5°44′27″E

Bergjeland or Bergeland is a neighborhood (delområde) in the city of Stavanger which lies in the southwestern part of the large municipality of Stavanger in Rogaland county, Norway. It is located in the northern part of the borough of Storhaug, and it includes part of the city centre. The neighborhood has a population of 3,146 which is distributed over an area of 0.88 square kilometres (0.34 sq mi).

The Bergeland Upper Secondary School and the Bergeland Tunnel are both notable places in the neighborhood.
