= Gyland =

Village in Flekkefjord Municipality, Norway

- Village
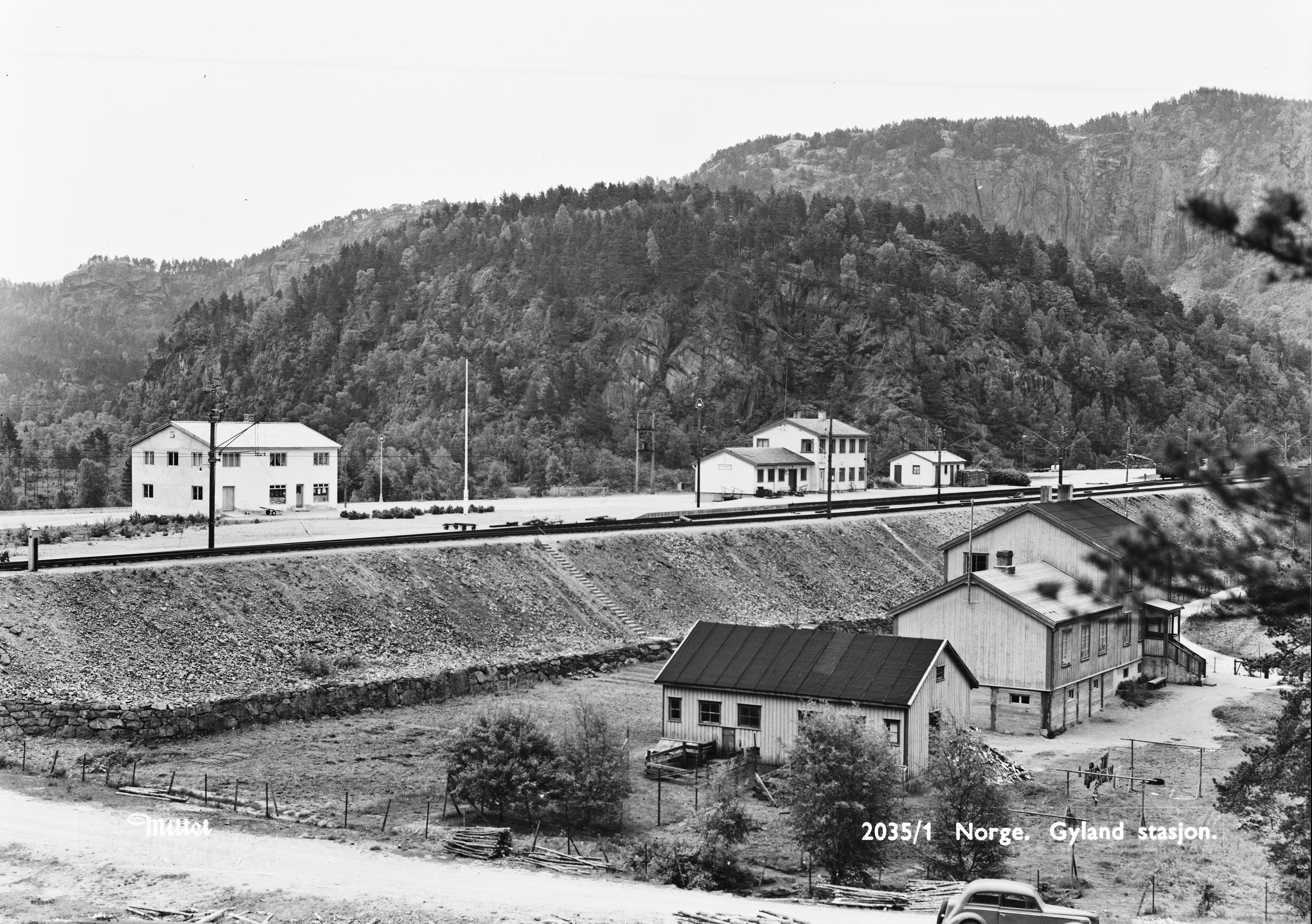
- View of the village railway station in 1953
- Interactive map of Gyland
- Coordinates: 58.43081°N 6.83972°E
- Country: Norway
- Region: Southern Norway
- County: Agder
- District: Lister
- Municipality: Flekkefjord Municipality
- Elevation: 128 m (420 ft)
- Time zone: UTC+01:00 (CET)
  - Summer (DST): UTC+02:00 (CEST)
- Post Code: 4436 Gyland

Gyland is a village in Flekkefjord Municipality in Agder county in Norway. It is located in the northeastern part of the municipality along the river Gylandselva, just a short distance north of the lake Kumlevollvatnet. The Sørlandet Line runs just south of the village, stopping at Gyland Station. The local village church, Gyland Church, was located in the village until 1929 when it was moved about 3 kilometres (1.9 mi) to the southwest. Now a small chapel is located in Gyland where the old church was once standing.

== History ==
Prior to 1965, the village was the administrative centre of the old Gyland Municipality.

=== Name ===
The village (originally the parish) was named after the old Gyland farm (Old Norse: Gýjuland), where Gyland Church was originally located. The first element is the old name of the river that flows past the farm (Old Norse: Gýja or Gý) and the last element is land which means "land".
