= Storekvina =

Village in Kvinesdal Municipality, Norway

- Village
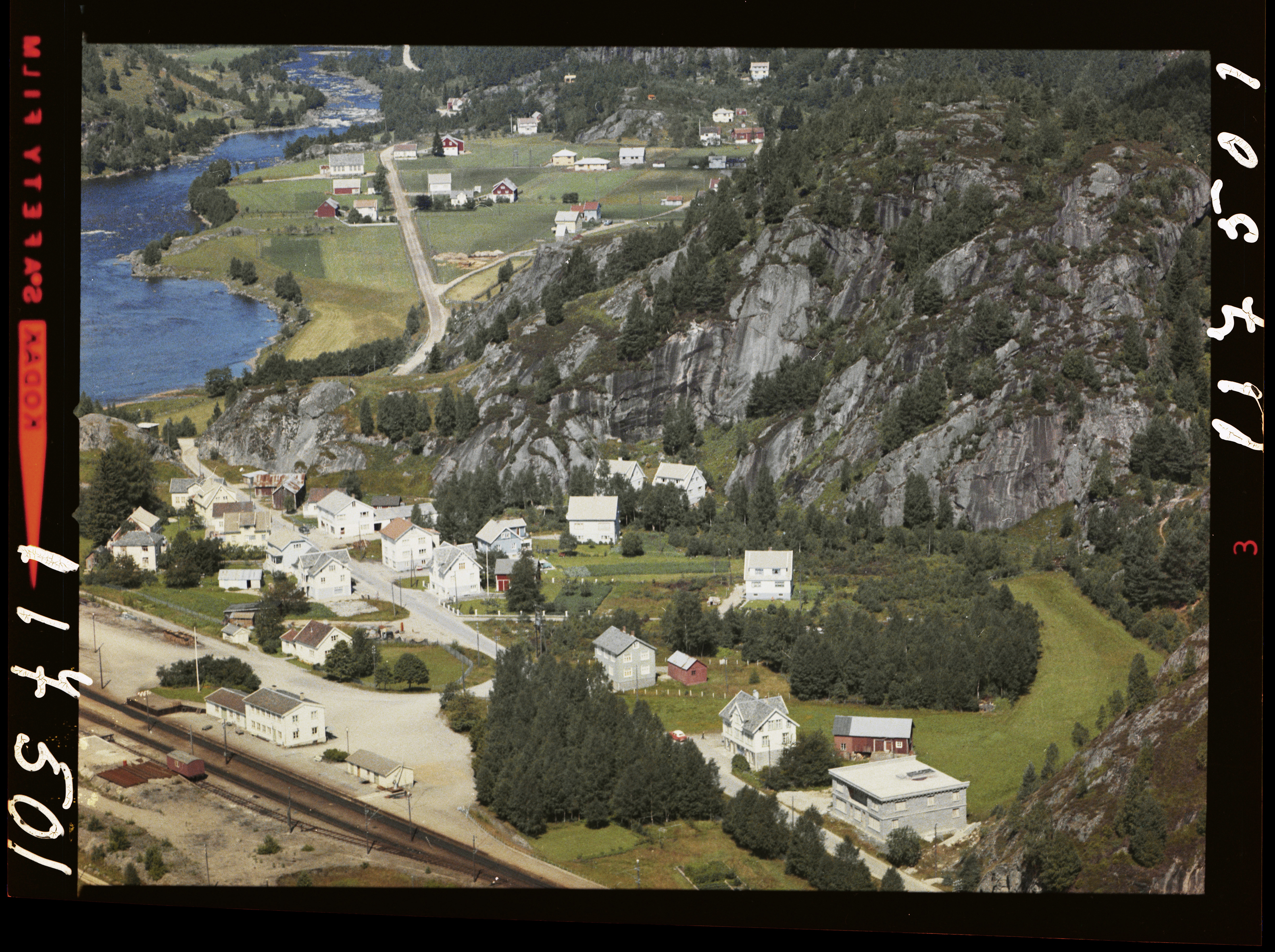
- View of the village
- Interactive map of Storekvina
- Coordinates: 58.38084°N 6.95721°E
- Country: Norway
- Region: Southern Norway
- County: Agder
- District: Lister
- Municipality: Kvinesdal Municipality
- Elevation: 134 m (440 ft)
- Time zone: UTC+01:00 (CET)
  - Summer (DST): UTC+02:00 (CEST)
- Post Code: 4480 Kvinesdal

Storekvina is a village in Kvinesdal Municipality in Agder county, Norway. The village is located on the shore of the river Kvina, about 7 kilometres (4.3 mi) north of the village of Liknes. The village had a population of 323 in 2015.

The Sørlandet Line runs through the village, stopping at the Storekvina Station, the sole train station serving Kvinesdal Municipality. There is also a primary school and a store in the village.

== See also ==
- Roinestad
