= Nærbø Station =

Railway station in Hå, Norway

Nærbø
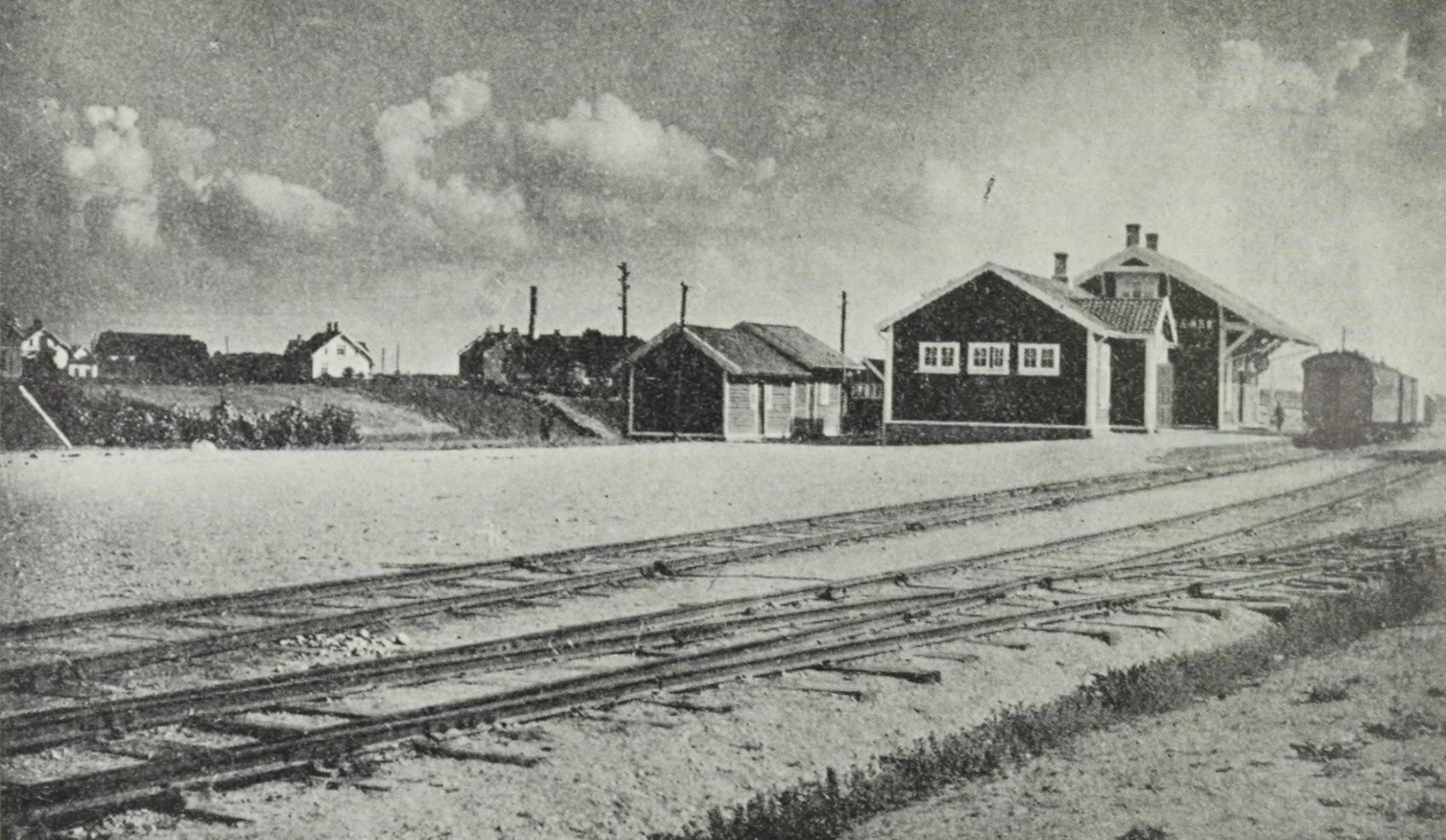

General information
- Location: Nærbø, Hå Municipality; Norway
- Coordinates: 58°39′55″N 5°38′24″E
- Elevation: 31.4 m (103 ft)
- Owner: Bane NOR
- Operator: Go-Ahead
- Line: Sørlandet Line
- Distance: 561.16 km (348.69 mi)
- Platforms: 2
- Connections: Bus: Kolumbus

History
- Opened: 1878
Location

Nærbø Station (Norwegian: Nærbø stasjon) is a railway station located at Nærbø in Hå Municipality, Norway on Sørlandet Line. The station is served by the Jæren Commuter Rail between Stavanger and Egersund, and one of the two bi-hourly train services as Nærbø as its terminal station. The station is 37.68 kilometers (23.41 mi) south of the city of Stavanger.

Preceding station	Local trains	Following station
Bryne towards Stavanger	L5 Jæren Commuter Rail	Varhaug towards Egersund
