= Johannes, Stavanger =

Neighborhood in Stavanger, Norway

Coordinates: 58°58′07″N 05°45′00″E

Johannes is a neighborhood (delområde) in the city of Stavanger which lies in the southwestern part of the large municipality of Stavanger in Rogaland county, Norway. It is located in the northern part of the borough of Storhaug in the area surrounding the St. Johannes Church. The neighborhood has a population of 2,309 which is distributed over an area of 0.56 square kilometres (140 acres).
