= Nærbø Church =

Church in Rogaland, Norway

- Nærbø kirke
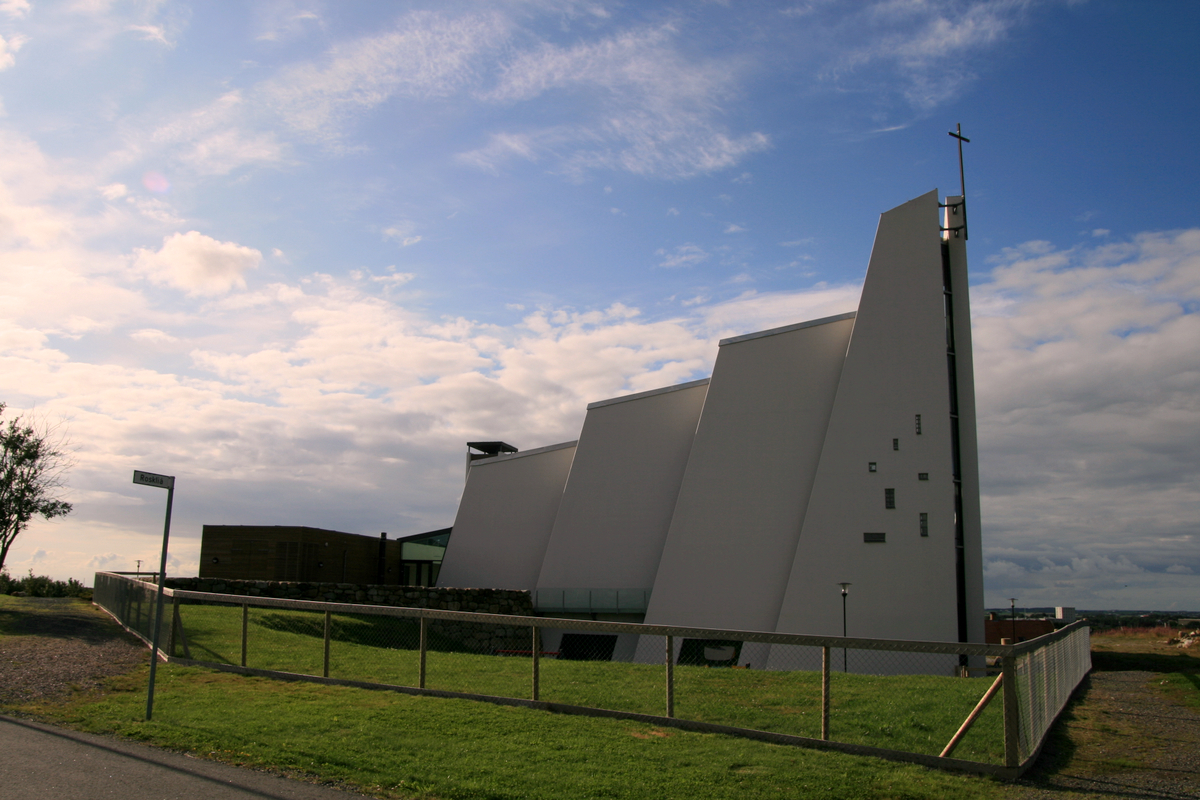
- View of the church
- Nærbø Church
- 58.658295°N 05.656895°E
- Location: Hå Municipality, Rogaland
- Country: Norway
- Denomination: Church of Norway
- Churchmanship: Evangelical Lutheran

History
- Status: Parish church
- Founded: 2005

Architecture
- Functional status: Active
- Architect: Gunnar Fossen
- Architectural type: Fan-shaped
- Completed: 2005 (21 years ago)

Specifications
- Capacity: 500
- Materials: Stone and glass

Administration
- Diocese: Stavanger bispedømme
- Deanery: Jæren prosti
- Parish: Nærbø

Nærbø Church (Norwegian: Nærbø kirke) is a parish church of the Church of Norway in Hå Municipality in Rogaland county, Norway. It is located in the village of Nærbø. It is the main church for the Nærbø parish which is part of the Jæren prosti (deanery) in the Diocese of Stavanger. The stone and glass church was built in a fan-shaped style in 2005 using designs by the architect Gunnar Fossen from the firm Brandsberg-Dahls Arkitektkontor AS. The church seats about 500 people.

== History ==
This church was built in 2005 to replace the Old Nærbø Church which was nearly 200 years old and too small for the community. This church cost about 44 million kr to build.

== Media gallery ==
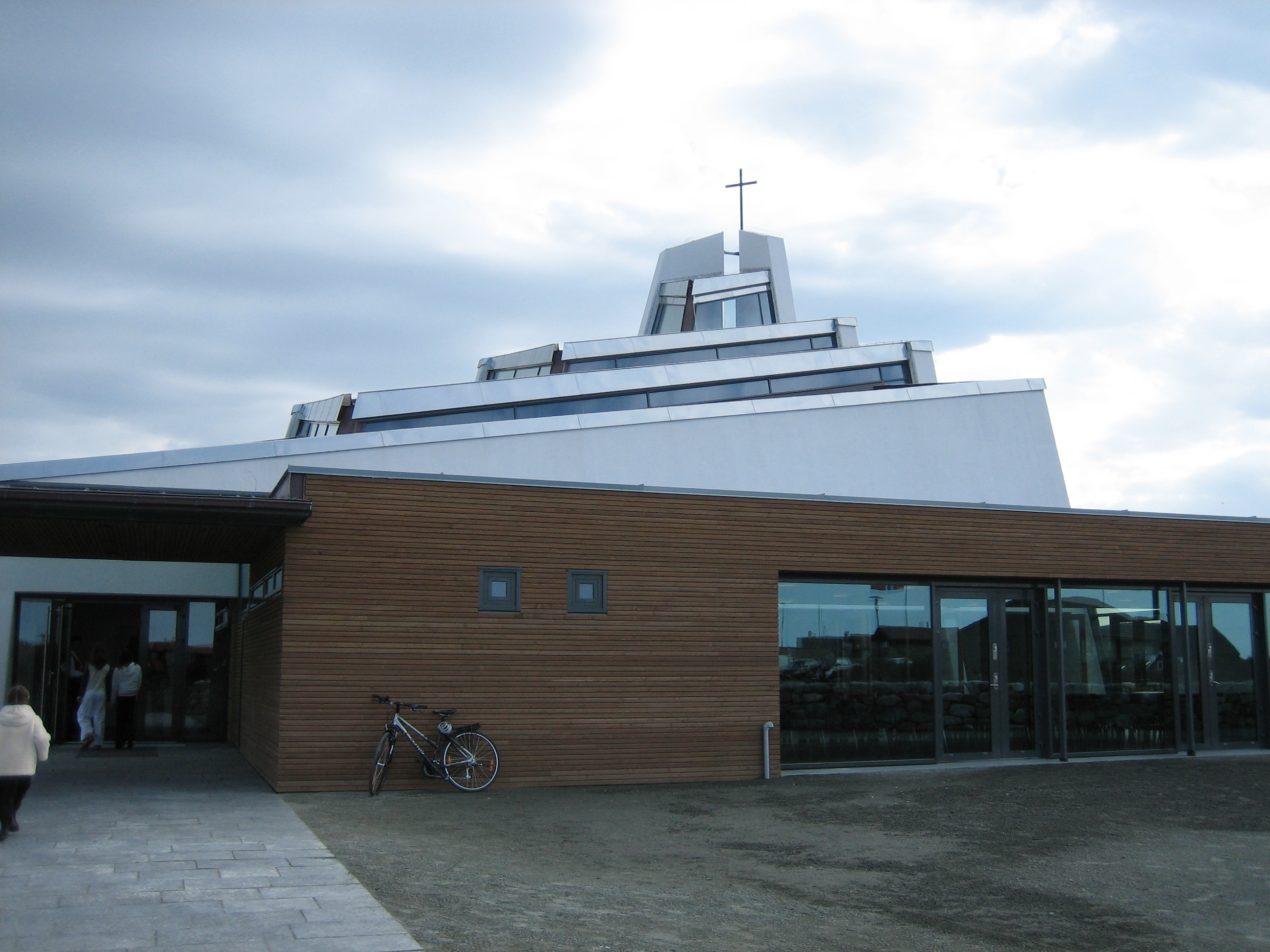

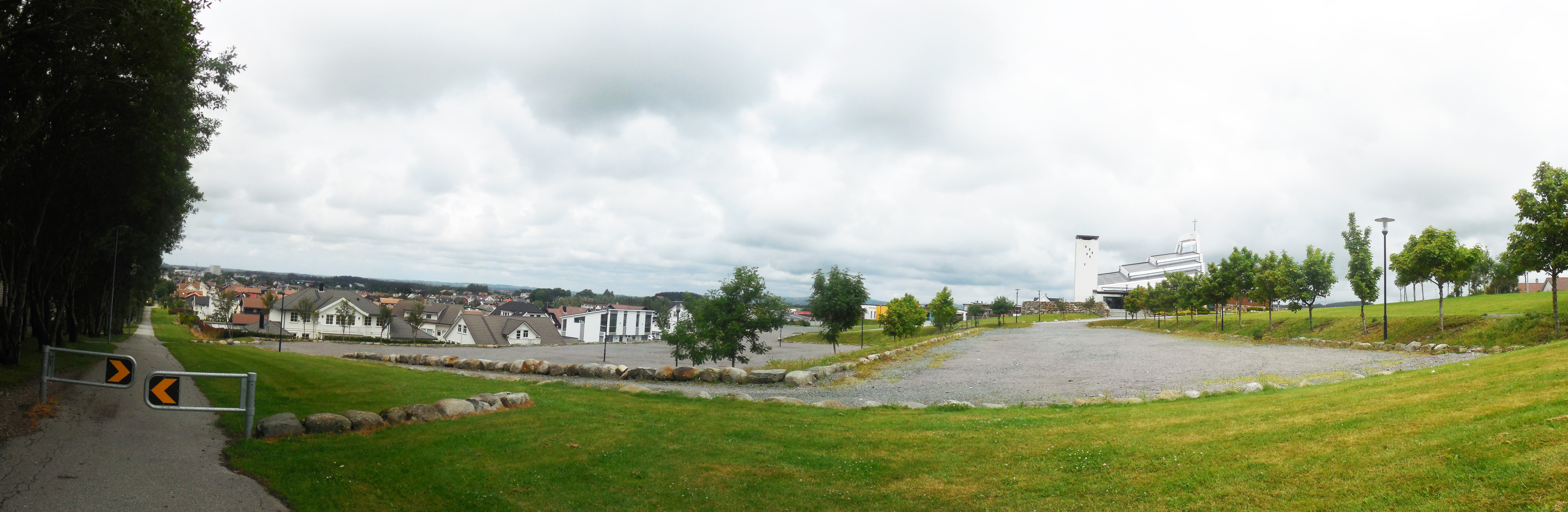
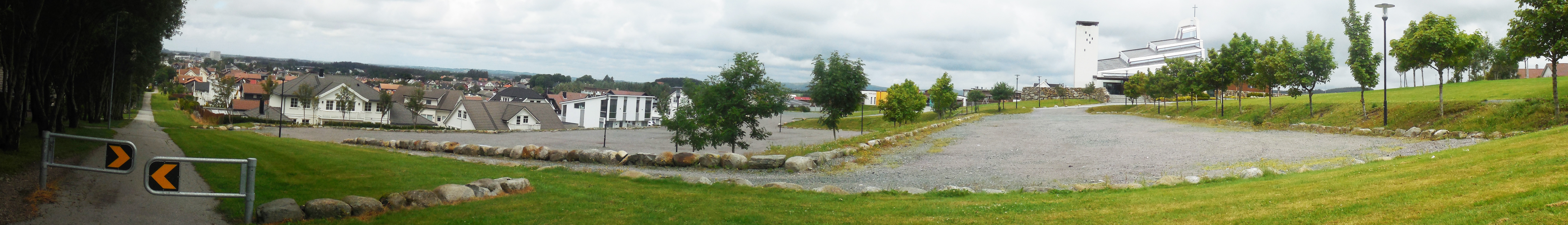
View of the area (scroll left-right to see more)

== See also ==
- List of churches in Rogaland
