= Paradis, Rogaland =

Neighborhood in Stavanger, Norway

Coordinates: 58°57′40″N 5°44′42″E

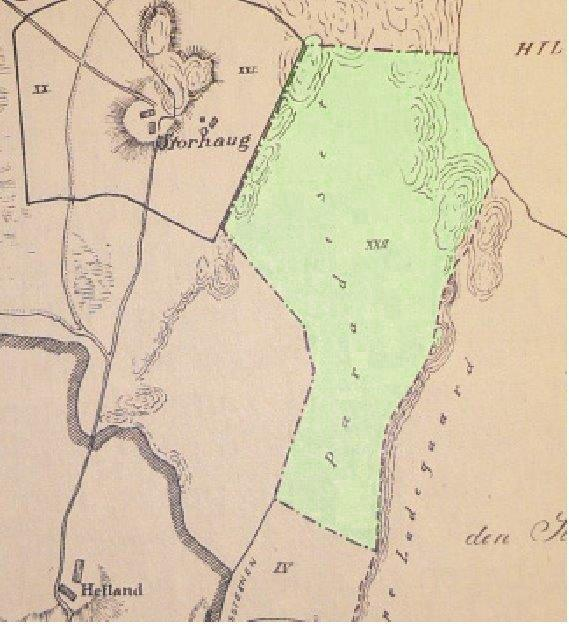
Paradis on the map of Hetland rectory from the 1840s

Paradis is a neighborhood (delområde) in the city of Stavanger which lies in the southwestern part of the large municipality of Stavanger in Rogaland county, Norway. It is located in the western part of the borough of Storhaug, just west of Nylund. It is served by Paradis Station of the Jæren Commuter Rail.
