= Storhaug =

Borough in Stavanger, Norway

Storhaug bydel
- Borough
- Coat of arms

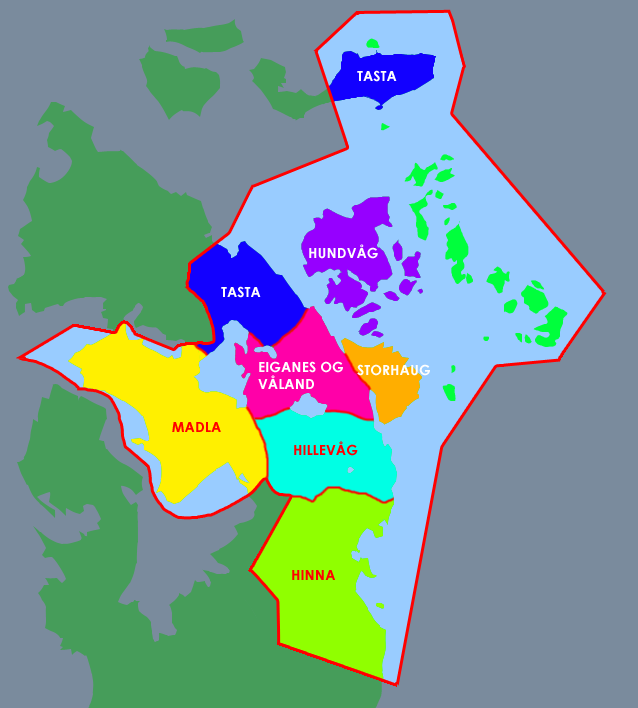
- Location within Stavanger municipality
- Coordinates: 58°58′07″N 05°44′56″E
- Country: Norway
- Region: Western Norway
- County: Rogaland
- District: Jæren
- City: Stavanger

Area
  - Total: 6.43 km^{2} (2.48 sq mi)
- Elevation: 22 m (72 ft)

Population (2024)
  - Total: 18,547
  - Density: 2,880/km^{2} (7,470/sq mi)
- Time zone: UTC+01:00 (CET)
  - Summer (DST): UTC+02:00 (CEST)
- Post Code: 4014 Stavanger

Storhaug is a borough of the city of Stavanger which lies in the southwestern part of the large Stavanger Municipality in Rogaland county, Norway. This borough includes the traditional city centre and main harbor along the Byfjorden. It is located east of Eiganes og Våland borough and south of the island borough of Hundvåg. The 6.43-square-kilometre (1,590-acre) borough has a population (2024) of 18,547. This gives the borough a population density of 2,573 inhabitants per square kilometre (6,660/sq mi).

== Neighbourhoods ==
Although the borders of "neighbourhoods" (delområder) do not correspond exactly to the borough borders, Storhaug roughly consists of the following neighbourhoods: Johannes, Nylund, Varden, Paradis, Bergjeland, and Øyane.

== Politics ==
The borough is not independently self-governing, but it falls under the municipal council for Stavanger Municipality. The municipal council has delegated some responsibilities to the a borough council (Norwegian: bydelsutvalg) for Storhaug. The borough council consists of 11 members. The tables below show the current and historical composition of the borough council by political party.

Storhaug bydelsutvalg 2023–2027
Party name (in Norwegian)	Number of representatives
Labour Party (Arbeiderpartiet)	3
Progress Party (Fremskrittspartiet)	1
Conservative Party (Høyre)	2
Christian Democratic Party (Kristelig Folkeparti)	1
Pensioners' Party (Pensjonistpartiet)	1
Red Party (Rødt)	1
Socialist Left Party (Sosialistisk Venstreparti)	1
Liberal Party (Venstre)	1
Total number of members:	11

Storhaug bydelsutvalg 2019–2023
Party name (in Norwegian)	Number of representatives
Labour Party (Arbeiderpartiet)	2
Progress Party (Fremskrittspartiet)	1
Green Party (Miljøpartiet De Grønne)	1
Conservative Party (Høyre)	3
Red Party (Rødt)	1
Centre Party (Senterpartiet)	1
Socialist Left Party (Sosialistisk Venstreparti)	1
Liberal Party (Venstre)	1
Total number of members:	11

Storhaug bydelsutvalg 2015–2019
Party name (in Norwegian)	Number of representatives
Labour Party (Arbeiderpartiet)	3
Progress Party (Fremskrittspartiet)	2
Conservative Party (Høyre)	2
Christian Democratic Party (Kristelig Folkeparti)	1
Red Party (Rødt)	1
Liberal Party (Venstre)	2
Total number of members:	11
