= Egersund Station =

Railway station in Eigersund, Norway

Egersund
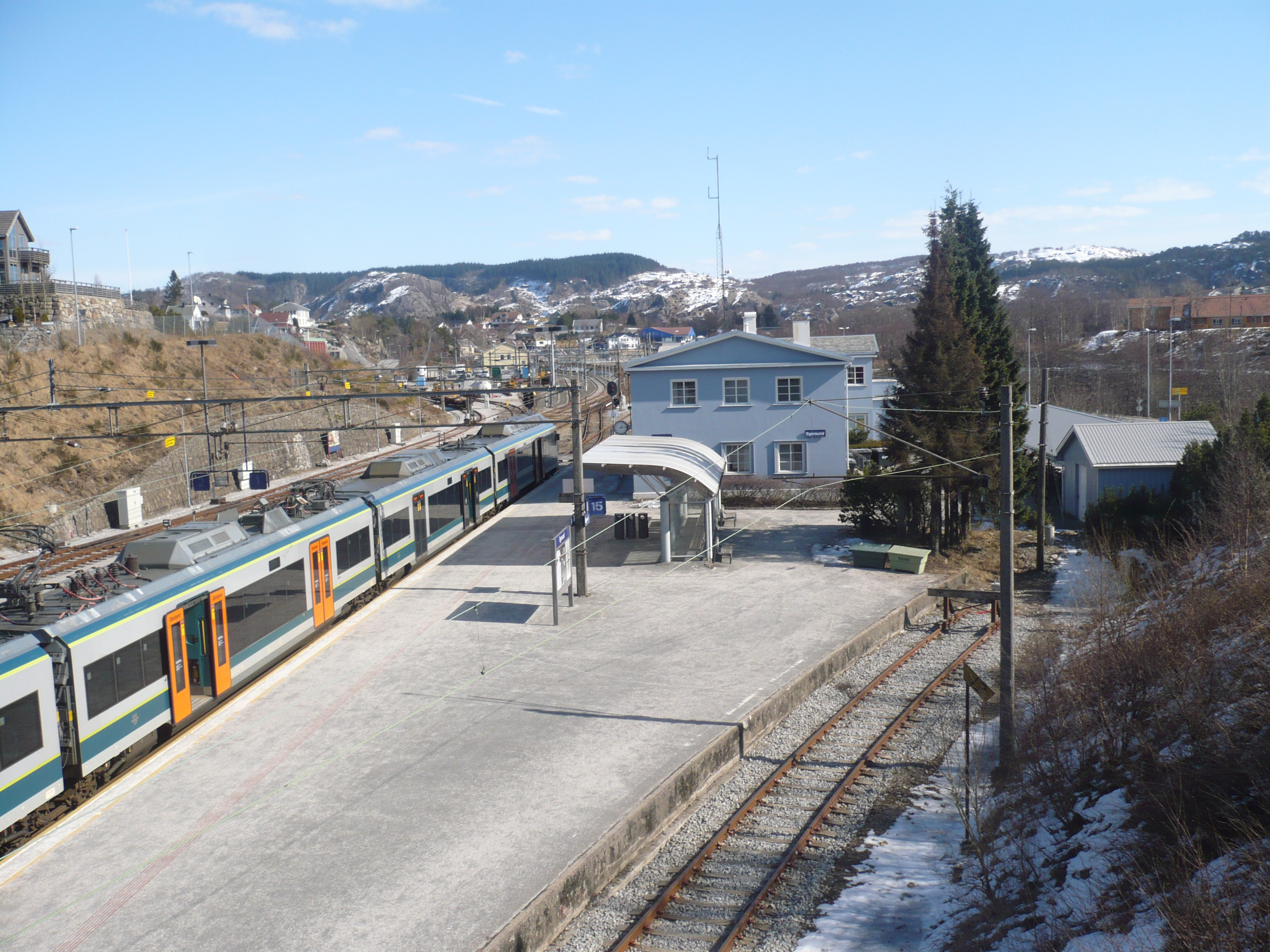

General information
- Location: Egersund, Eigersund Municipality; Norway
- Coordinates: 58°27′41″N 6°00′08″E
- Elevation: 11.1 m (36 ft)
- Owner: Bane NOR
- Operator: Go-Ahead Norge
- Line: Sørlandet Line
- Distance: 525.56 km (326.57 mi)
- Platforms: 2
- Connections: Bus: Kolumbus

Other information
- Station code: EGS

History
- Opened: 1944
Location

Egersund Station (Norwegian: Egersund stasjon) is a railway station located in the town of Egersund in Eigersund Municipality in Rogaland county, Norway. The station is located on the Sørlandet Line, about 74.71 kilometers (46.42 mi) south of the city of Stavanger. It is served by regional trains between Stavanger and Kristiansand as well as being the terminus of the Jæren Commuter Rail to Stavanger.

== History ==
The station is from 1944 when Jæren Line was connected to the Sørlandet Line, and converted to standard gauge. Prior to this the old station in Egersund, the terminal station of Jæren Line, was located about one kilometer away.

Preceding station	Express trains	Following station
Bryne towards Stavanger	F5	Moi towards Oslo S
Preceding station	Local trains	Following station
Hellvik towards Stavanger	L5 Jæren Commuter Rail	Terminus
