= Stavanger Station =

Railway station in Stavanger, Norway

Stavanger
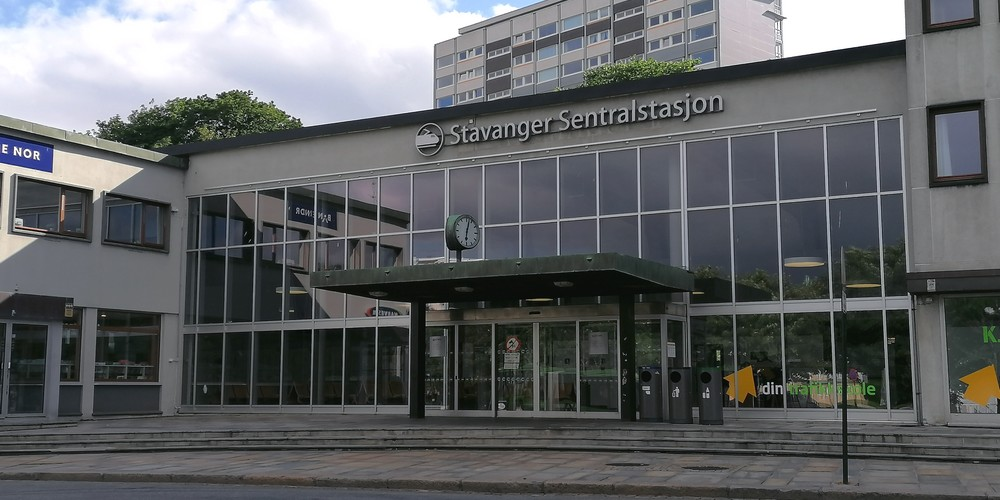

General information
- Location: Downtown, Stavanger; Norway
- Coordinates: 58.9669°N 5.7320°E
- Elevation: 5.3 m (17 ft)
- Owner: Bane NOR
- Operator: Go-Ahead Norge
- Line: Sørlandet Line
- Distance: 598.70 km (372.01 mi)
- Tracks: 4
- Connections: Bus: Kolumbus

Construction
- Cycle facilities: A bicycle hotel that has space for 42 bicycles: 21 regular bicycles, five transport bicycles and 16 electric bicycles.
- Accessible: The station is equipped with a mobile ramp for wheelchair users. This is served by the conductor and gives access to trains on demand.
- Architect: Gustav Helland

Other information
- Station code: STV
- Fare zone: Nord-Jæren

History
- Opened: 1878
Location

Stavanger Station (Norwegian: Stavanger stasjon) is a railway station in Stavanger municipality in Rogaland county, Norway. It is located in the centre of the city of Stavanger and it is the terminus of the Sørlandet Line. The station is served by regional trains to Kristiansand and the Jæren Commuter Rail.

== History ==
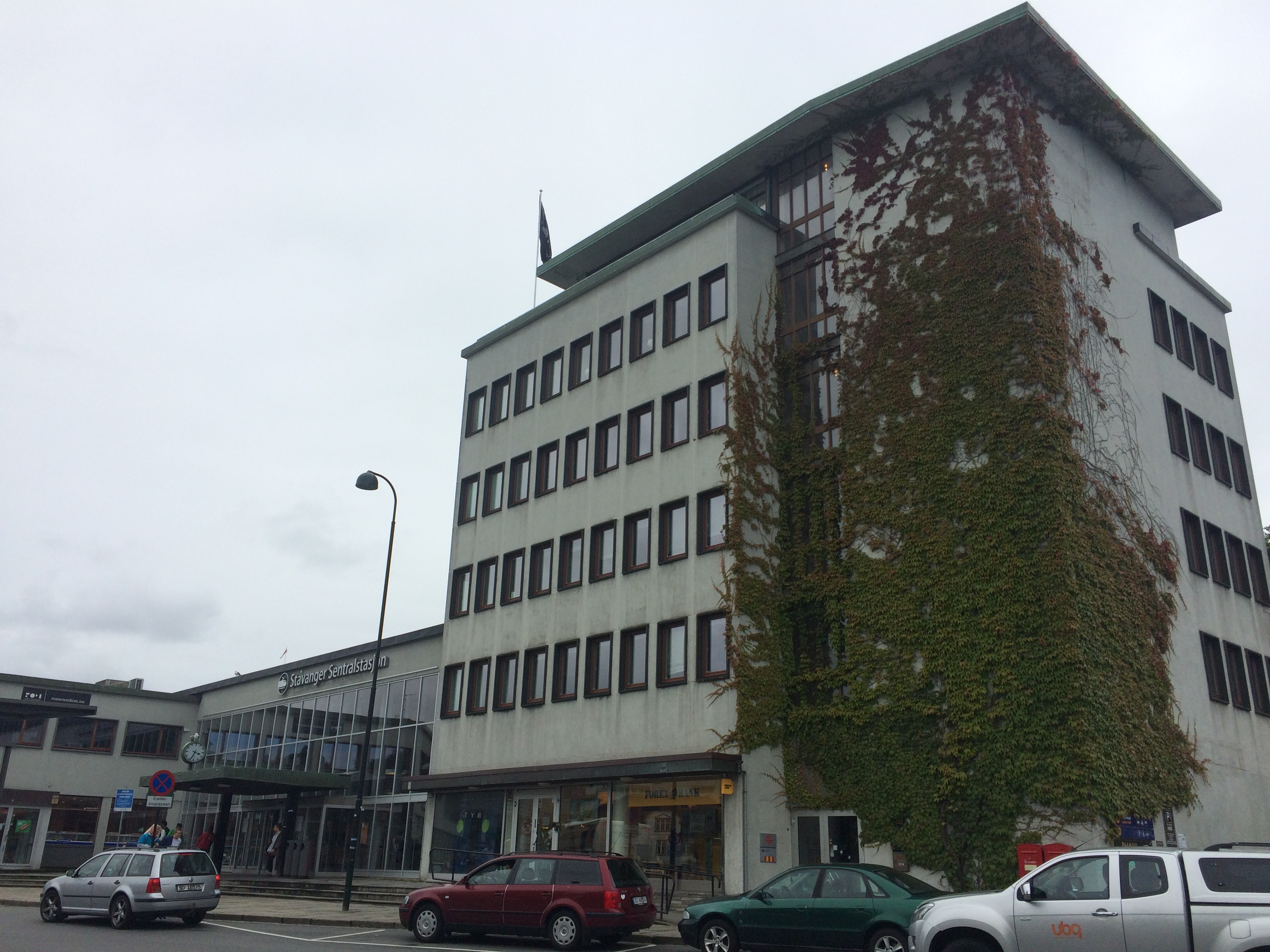
Stavanger Station

The station was opened in 1872 as part of Jæren Line from Stavanger to Egersund. In 1944 it became part of the Sørlandet Line when it was concluded between Egersund and Kristiansand. A restaurant was established in a barracks next to the station by Norsk Spisevognselskap on 15 June 1946. There is a bus terminal at the station, and boat and ferry port nearby.

== Facilities ==
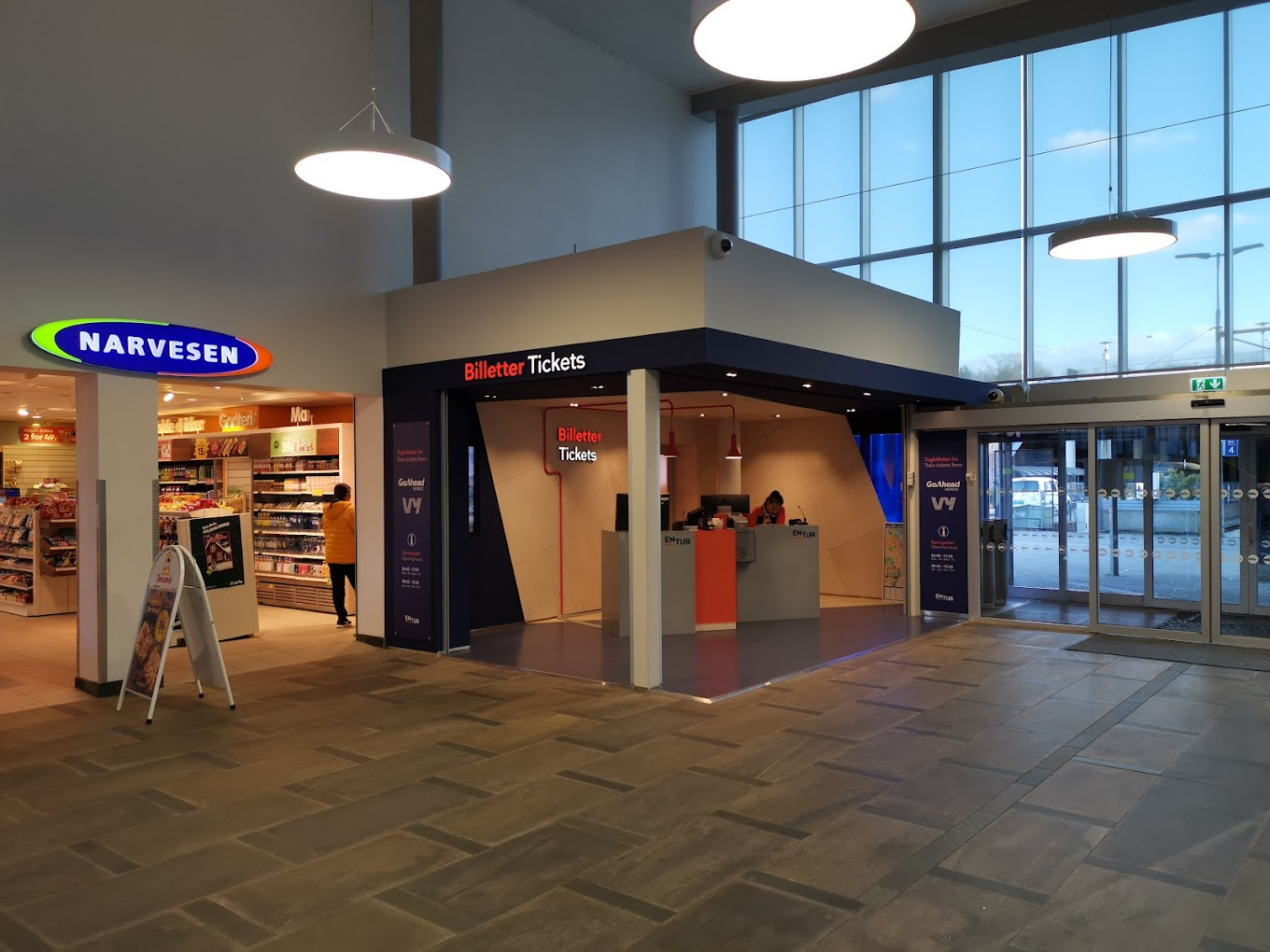
The Entur ticket office in Stavanger that's open from 06:40-17:25 (weekdays) and 08:35-15:35 (weekends)

The station has one of the 5 staffed ticket offices in Norway, with the other 4 being Bergen, Trondheim, Oslo S and Oslo Airport. Since 2016 the ticket offices have been run by Entur AS and travellers can buy local bus tickets and train tickets for all national trains. During weekdays it is also possible to buy interrail and International train tickets. The station has an Narvesen, Backstube and a traffic school. There is also a small amount of storage lockers for hire.

== Train lines ==
Preceding station	Express trains	Following station
Terminus	F5	Sandnes Sentrum towards Oslo S
Preceding station	Local trains	Following station
Terminus	L5 Jæren Commuter Rail	Paradis towards Egersund
