= Kolumbus =

Public transport authority of Rogaland, Norway

Kolumbus AS
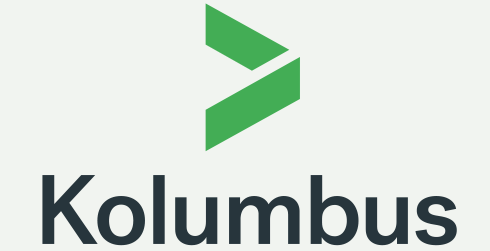

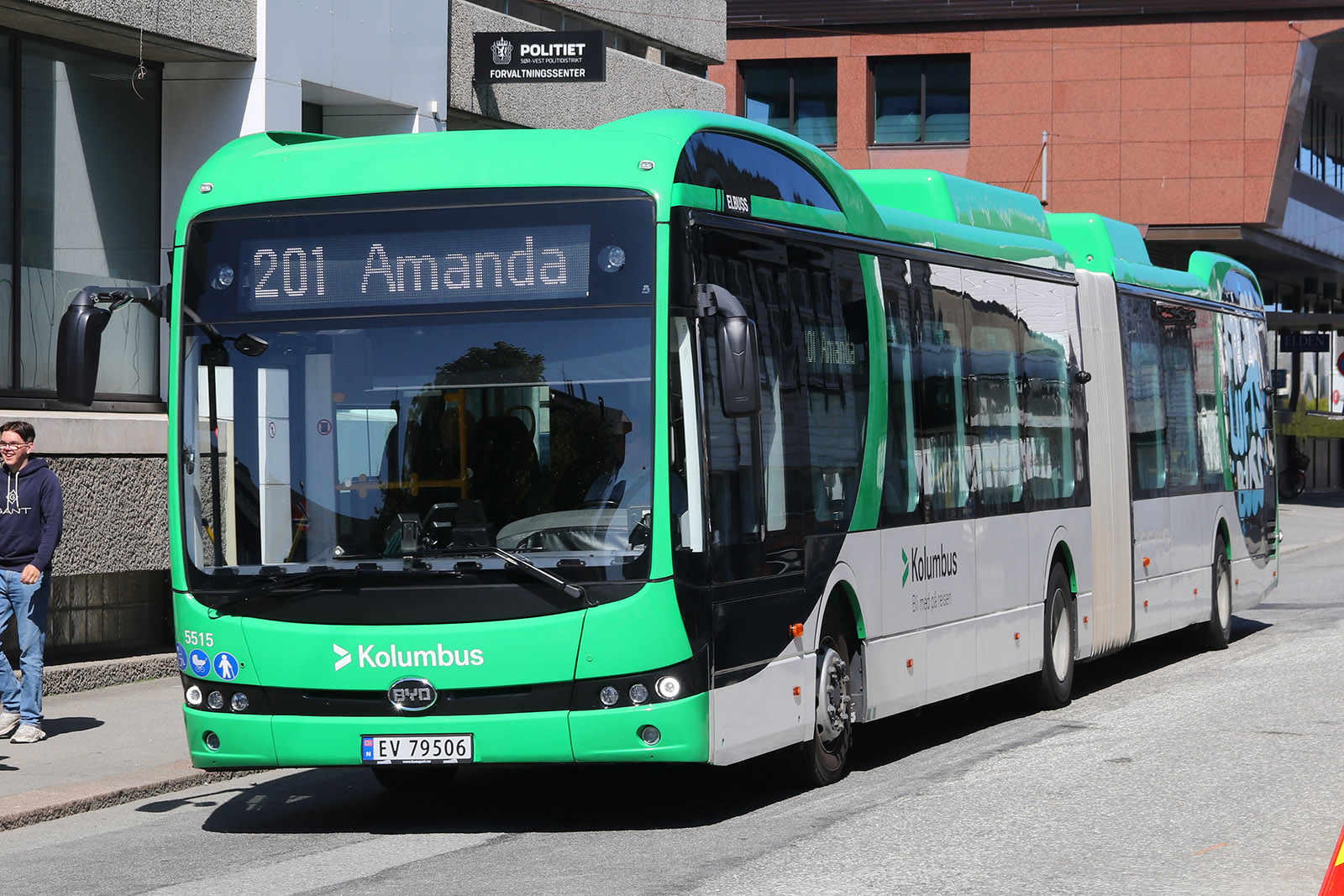
- A BYD electric bus of Kolumbus in Haugesund in 2023
- Company type: County owned
- Industry: Public transport
- Founded: January 1, 2002
- Headquarters: Stavanger, Norway
- Area served: Rogaland
- Number of employees: 71 (2026)
- Parent: Rogaland county municipality
- Website: www.kolumbus.no

Kolumbus AS, formerly Rogaland Kollektivtrafikk FKF, is the public transportation administration in Rogaland, Norway and organised as a county agency. The agency is responsible for planning, marketing and organising the public transport in Rogaland, including buses and passenger ferries, but does not perform any transport itself. Instead it awards public service obligation (PSO) contracts to independent operators. The agency was created on January 1, 2002 and has 35 employees and offices at Byterminalen in Stavanger. All buses operated in Rogaland are branded as Kolumbus and painted green. Before Kolumbus was created, there were several smaller companies who was responsible for the transport in the different parts of Rogaland. However, because of complications with bus lines not overlapping with each other, the bus companies finally decided to unite and become Kolumbus, or Rogaland Kollektivtrafikk (Rogaland Public Transports) as it is also known as.

The companies that have contracts with Kolumbus are Tide Buss, Nettbuss, Norgesbuss and Boreal Norge (buses) and Stavangerske, Torghatten Trafikkselskap, L. Rødne og Sønner and John Arne Helgøy (ferries).

Trains are not within the responsibility of Kolumbus. Vy has the responsibility and sells tickets for almost all trains in Norway. But Kolumbus has negotiated validity for period passes for both trains and buses. There are local trains Stavanger - Sandnes and Stavanger - Egersund (Jæren Commuter Rail).

== History ==
In 2003 the first PSO contracts were awarded to in Greater Stavanger. At the same time there was a number of changes in the routes and ticket zones, creating some confusion. In 2006 the routes in Jæren and Dalane were also changed to PSO contracts. The same year the new ticketing system was introduced, but this system has had major starting problems, resulting in many trips not being charged and loss of income for the companies.

On July 26, 2013, Kolumbus unveiled their new logo.

== Kolumbus Card ==
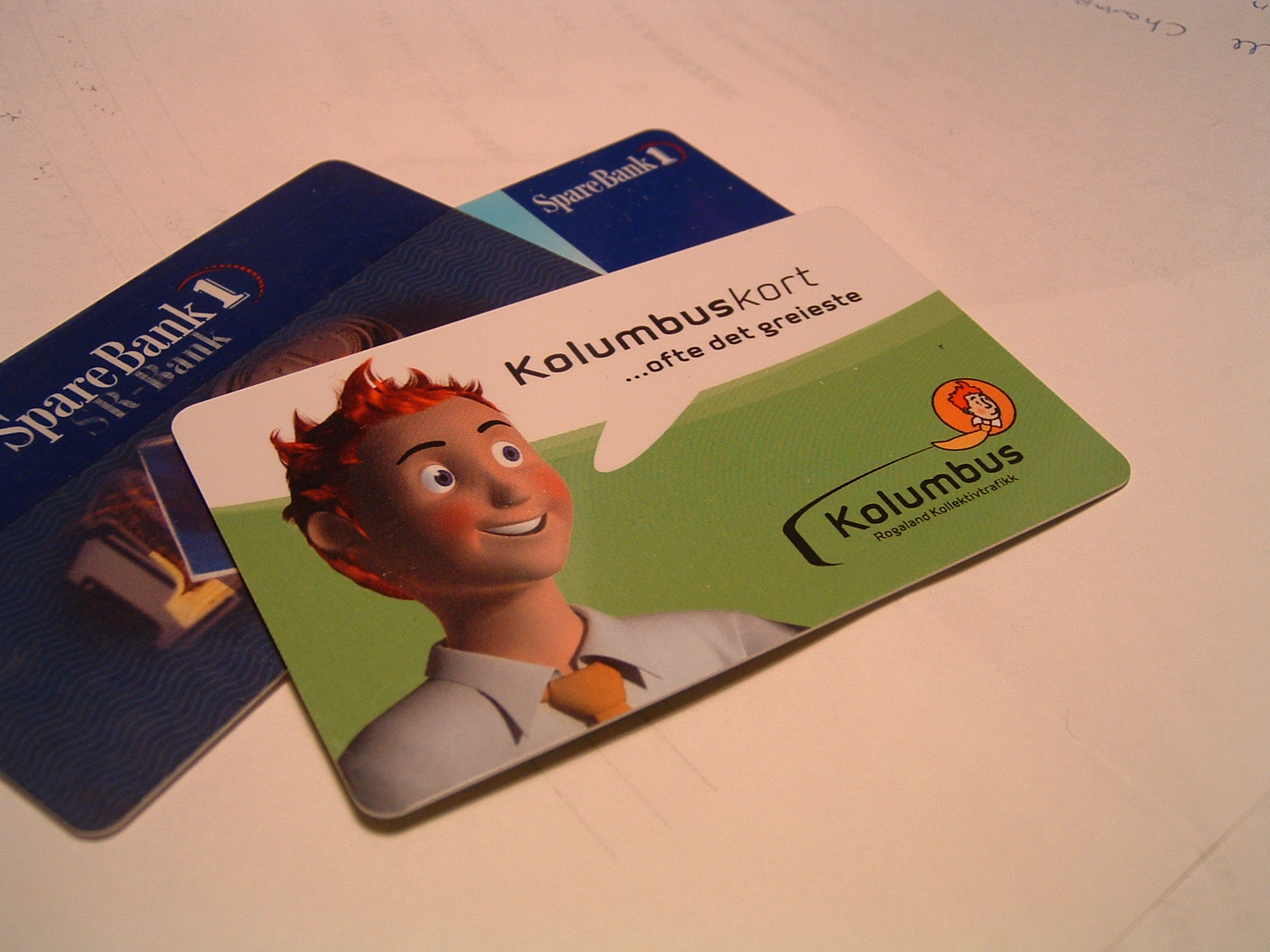
Kolumbuskortet compared to bank cards

The Kolumbus Card is an electronic ticketing system launched in 2006. It allows all travels with bus, ferry and the Jæren Commuter Rail to be paid with the cards. Depending on the travel card a user purchases, the card is either personal or impersonal. If used as a prepaid card, it is impersonal and allows the user to charge the card like a prepaid card for a mobile telephone, giving the use a credit that can use to pay for travel. Prepaid ticket rates are cheaper than the cash fare. The card can also be charged with a monthly ticket. Depending on the monthly ticket, the card can be both personal or impersonal: The Flexipass which allows unlimited monthly travel by bus within one of four zones is impersonal. As long as the account is valid, the Kolumbus card can be used by anybody. The Periodic pass allows unlimited travel along a given route, with the options of used train, bus, and ferry. The Periodic pass is personal and can only be used by the person who owns the card. The Kolumbus Card uses non-contact smartcard technology so the card can stay in the wallet while it is swept by the reader.

The agency has sent the Kolumbus Card to all residents above 16 in Rogaland, but other people can get a new card at the Kolumbus office for a small fee of 50 Norwegian kroner. There has also been created a miniCard that allows users to pay for only single trips without the Kolumbus Card. There's a paper version of the Kolumbus Card which tourists can use for smaller (Less than 14 days) products.

== Apps ==
Kolumbus has 3 different apps. The Kolumbus ticket app, the Kolumbus travel planner and the Kolumbus "sanntids" app.

In the ticket app, passengers can buy singular tickets and period tickets. It is cheaper to buy the ticket in the app than on board in the bus. The app is easy to use. It is mandatory to scan the ticket on board, in order for the bus driver to control that the passengers have a valid ticket. In the travel planner it is possible to plan the travel from a specific address or a search in the map. The searches get saved in the app so it gets easier for the travellers. The app gives information about departure and arrival time for bus, train and boat.

The Kolumbus "sanntids" app shows where the bus is at any time. Travelers can see if the bus is delayed or ahead of expected arrival. The sanntids app is a helpful tool for travelers, as the bus can be delayed.

All of the apps can be downloaded from the App Store or Google Play
