= Mosterøy Municipality =

Former municipality in Rogaland, Norway

Mosterøy Municipality Mosterøy herred
- Former municipality
- Mosterø herred (historic name)
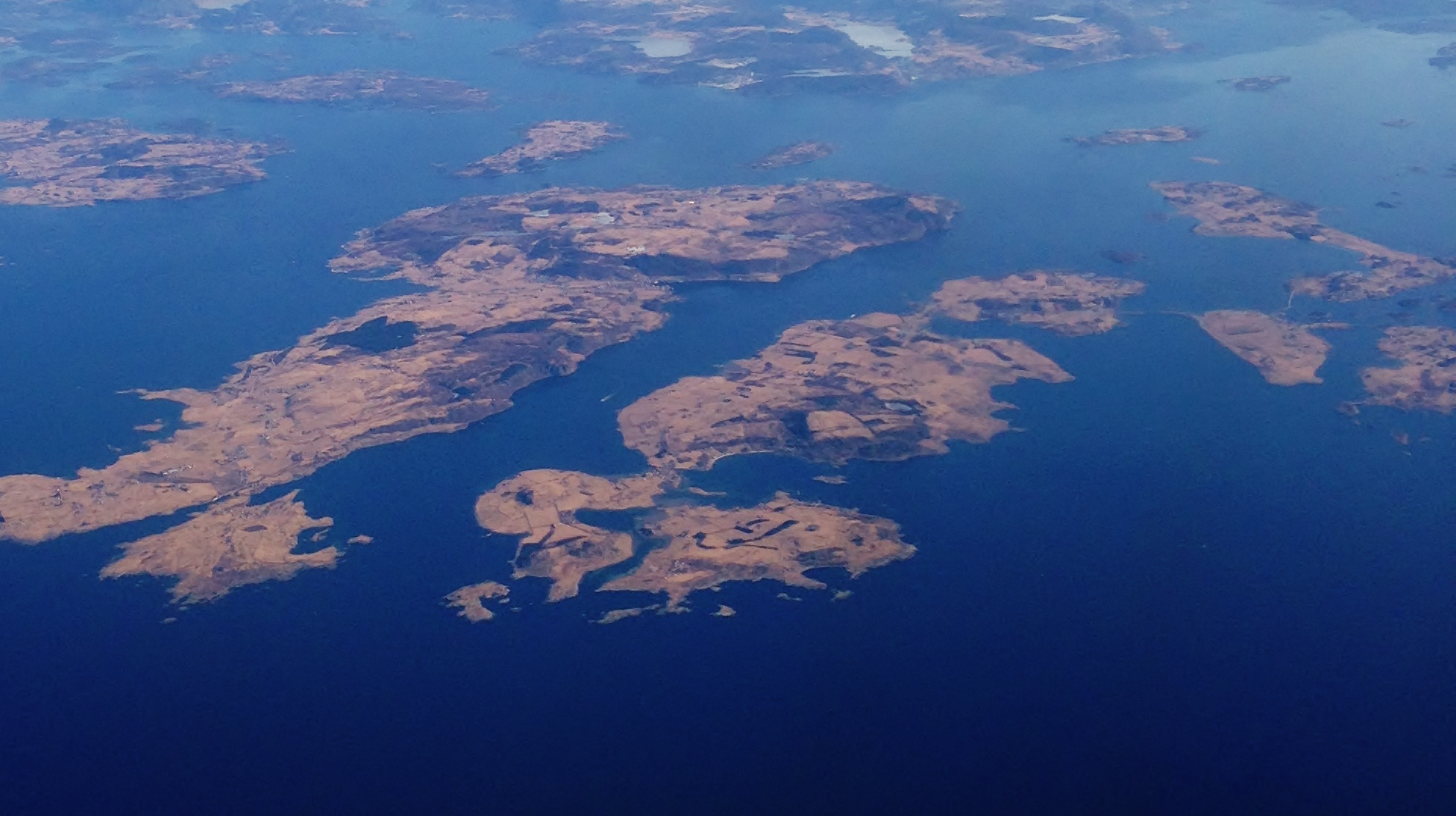
- Mosterøy municipality included the islands on the right half of the picture

- Rogaland within Norway

- Mosterøy within Rogaland
- Coordinates: 59°05′07″N 05°38′11″E
- Country: Norway
- County: Rogaland
- District: Ryfylke
- Established: 1 July 1884
  - Preceded by: Rennesøy Municipality
- Disestablished: 1 Jan 1965
  - Succeeded by: Rennesøy Municipality
- Administrative centre: Askje

Government
  - Mayor (1951–1964): Erling Sokn

Area (upon dissolution)
  - Total: 23.2 km^{2} (9.0 sq mi)
  - Rank: #492 in Norway
- Highest elevation: 154 m (505 ft)

Population (1964)
  - Total: 814
  - Rank: #501 in Norway
  - Density: 35.1/km^{2} (91/sq mi)
  - Change (10 years): ▼ −7.8%
- Demonym: Mosterøybu

Official language
  - Norwegian form: Nynorsk
- Time zone: UTC+01:00 (CET)
  - Summer (DST): UTC+02:00 (CEST)
- ISO 3166 code: NO-1143

Mosterøy is a former municipality in Rogaland county, Norway. The 23.2-square-kilometre (9.0 sq mi) municipality existed from 1884 until its dissolution in 1965. The area is now part of Stavanger Municipality in the traditional district of Ryfylke. The administrative centre was the village of Askje where the Askje Church is located.

Prior to its dissolution in 1965, the 23.2-square-kilometre (9.0 sq mi) municipality was the 492nd largest by area out of the 525 municipalities in Norway. Mosterøy Municipality was the 501st most populous municipality in Norway with a population of about 814. The municipality's population density was 35.1 inhabitants per square kilometre (91/sq mi) and its population had decreased by 7.8% over the previous 10-year period.

The Utstein Abbey, the best-preserved medieval monastery in Norway, is located on the island of Klosterøy. It was one of the most notable historic sites in the municipality.

== General information ==
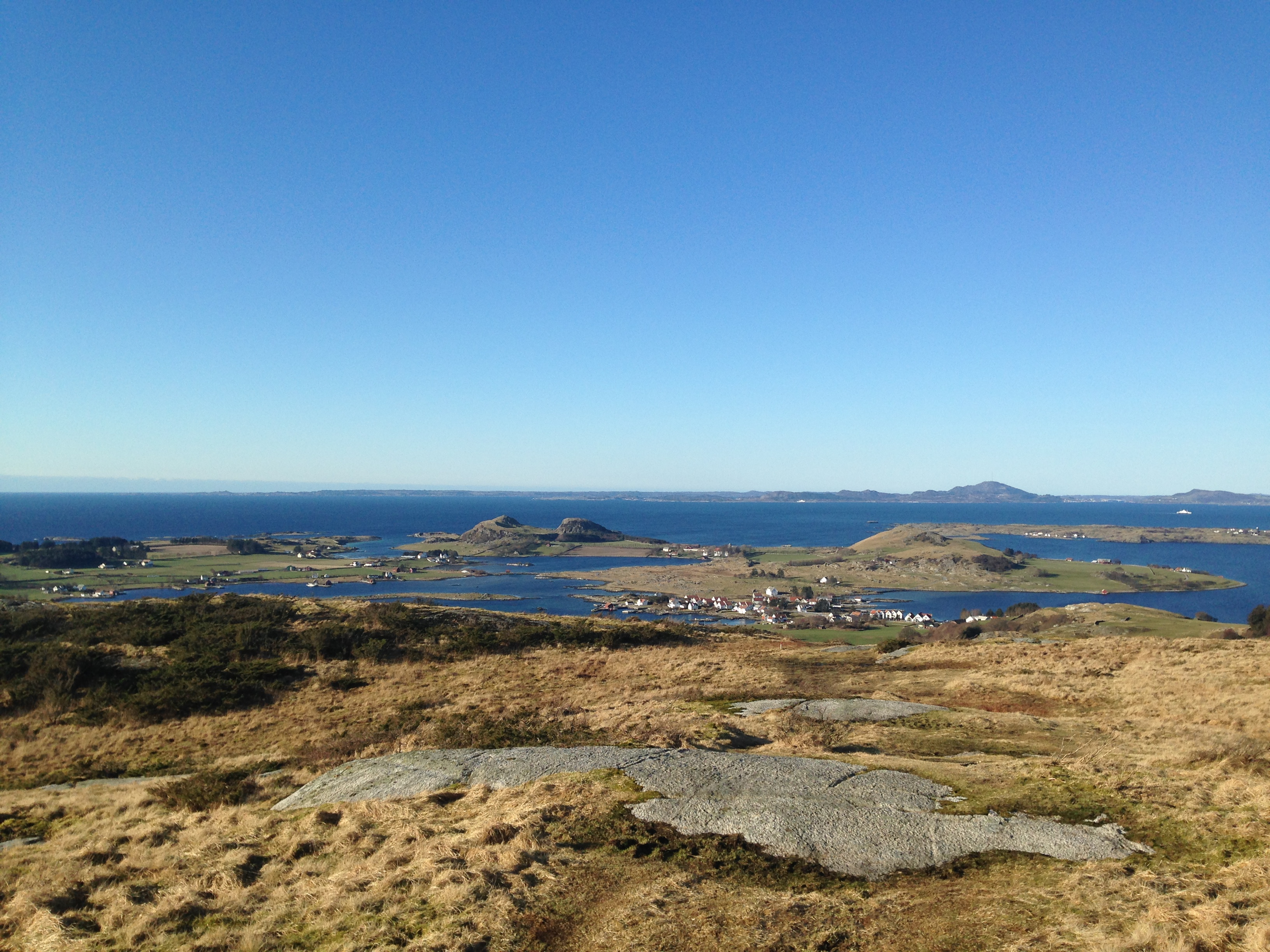
View of the island of Mosterøy

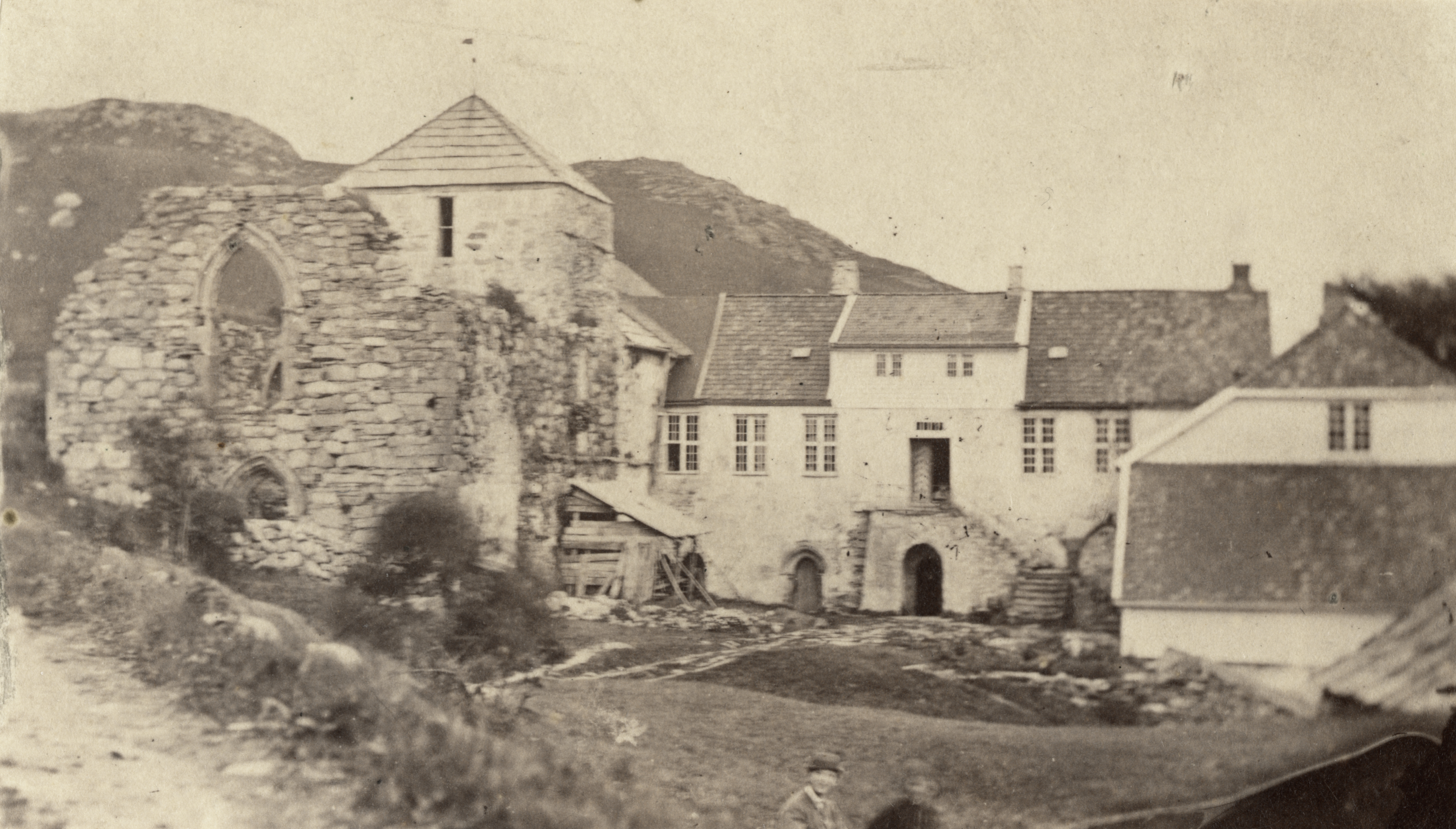
View of the historic Utstein Abbey

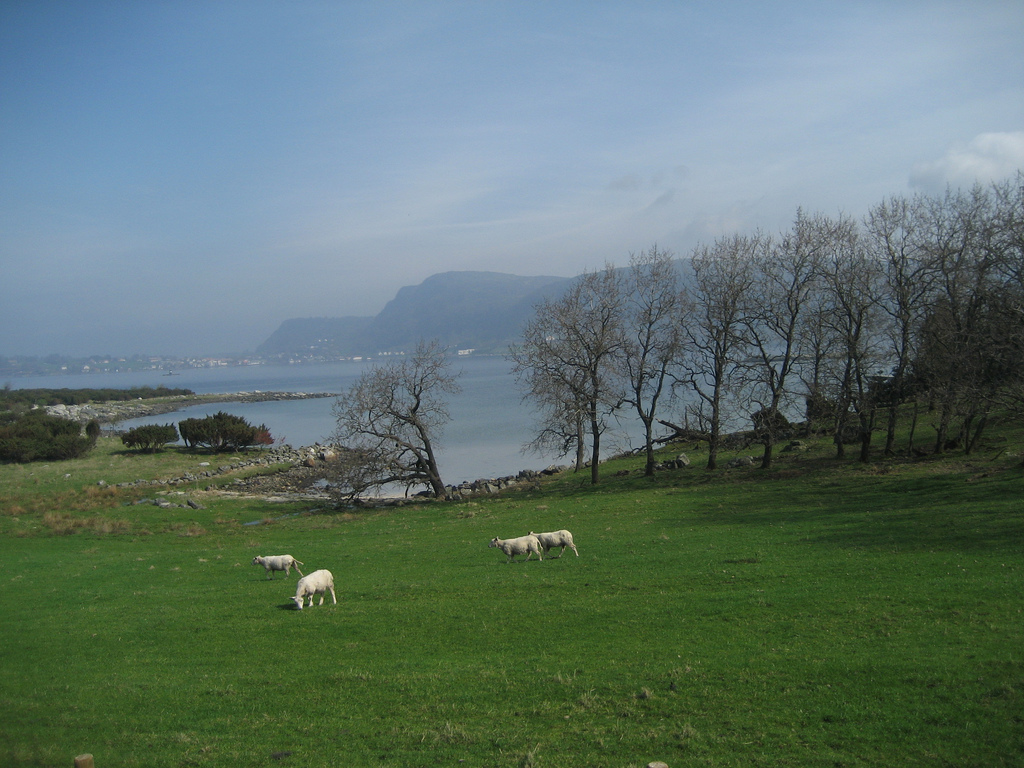
View of Askje, one of the islands in Mosterøy municipality

The municipality of Mosterøy was established on 1 July 1884 when the larger Rennesøy Municipality was divided in two: the northern islands (population: 1,092) remained as a smaller Rennesøy Municipality and the southern islands (population: 1,309) became the new Mosterøy Municipality.

On 1 January 1923, the westernmost group of outlying islands (population: 581) were separated from Mosterøy Municipality to form the new Kvitsøy Municipality. The split left Mosterøy Municipality with 745 inhabitants.

During the 1960s, there were many municipal mergers across Norway due to the work of the Schei Committee. On 1 January 1965, Mosterøy Municipality (population: 817) and Rennesøy Municipality (population: 1,370) were merged (back) together to form a larger Rennesøy Municipality.

On 1 January 2020, all of Rennesøy Municipality (including the areas of the former Mosterøy Municipality) became part of Stavanger Municipality.

=== Name ===
The municipality (originally the parish) is named after the island of Mosterøy (Old Norse: Mostr or Monstr) since the first Utstein Church was built there. The meaning of the first element of the name is uncertain. One possibility is that it is a shortened version of the Latin word monasterium which means "monastery", since the Utstein Abbey is located on the northwest end of the island. Another possibility is that it comes from the word mǫn which means "mane". A third possibility is that it comes from the word mœnir which means "ridge", likely referring to the 154-metre (505 ft) tall Mastravarden, the highest point on the island. The last element of the name is øy which means "island".

Historically, the name of the municipality was spelled Mosterø. On 3 November 1917, a royal resolution changed the spelling of the name of the municipality to Mosterøy. The letter y was added to the end of the word to "Norwegianize" the name (ø is the Danish word for "island" and øy is the Norwegian word).

=== Churches ===
The Church of Norway had one parish (sokn) within Mosterøy Municipality. At the time of the municipal dissolution, it was part of the Rennesøy prestegjeld and the Hetland prosti (deanery) in the Diocese of Stavanger.

Churches in Mosterøy Municipality
Parish (sokn)	Church name	Location of the church	Year built
Mosterøy	Askje Church	Askje	1846
Mosterøy	Utstein Chapel	Klosterøy	1280
Mosterøy	Vestre Åmøy Chapel	Western Åmøy	1953

== Geography ==
The island municipality included the islands of Mosterøy, Klosterøy, Fjøløy, Sokn, Bru, and the western half of the island of Åmøy (the eastern half was part of Hetland Municipality). The highest point in the municipality was the 154-metre (505 ft) tall mountain Mastravarden on the island of Mosterøy. Rennesøy Municipality was located to the north, Hetland Municipality was located to the southeast, Randaberg Municipality was located to the southwest, and Kvitsøy Municipality was located to the west.

== Government ==
While it existed, Mosterøy Municipality was responsible for primary education (through 10th grade), outpatient health services, senior citizen services, welfare and other social services, zoning, economic development, and municipal roads and utilities. The municipality was governed by a municipal council of directly elected representatives. The mayor was indirectly elected by a vote of the municipal council. The municipality was under the jurisdiction of the Ryfylke District Court and the Gulating Court of Appeal.

=== Municipal council ===
The municipal council (Heradsstyre) of Mosterøy Municipality was made up of 13 representatives that were elected to four year terms. The tables below show the historical composition of the council by political party.

Mosterøy heradsstyre 1963–1965
Party name (in Nynorsk)	Number of representatives
Labour Party (Arbeidarpartiet)	2
Conservative Party (Høgre)	2
Centre Party (Senterpartiet)	4
Liberal Party (Venstre)	5
Total number of members:	13
Note: On 1 January 1965, Mosterøy Municipality became part of Rennesøy Municipality.

Mosterøy heradsstyre 1959–1963
Party name (in Nynorsk)	Number of representatives
Labour Party (Arbeidarpartiet)	3
Conservative Party (Høgre)	2
Centre Party (Senterpartiet)	3
Liberal Party (Venstre)	5
Total number of members:	13

Mosterøy heradsstyre 1955–1959
Party name (in Nynorsk)	Number of representatives
Labour Party (Arbeidarpartiet)	2
Conservative Party (Høgre)	3
Farmers' Party (Bondepartiet)	3
Liberal Party (Venstre)	5
Total number of members:	13

Mosterøy heradsstyre 1951–1955
Party name (in Nynorsk)	Number of representatives
Labour Party (Arbeidarpartiet)	3
Conservative Party (Høgre)	2
Farmers' Party (Bondepartiet)	2
Liberal Party (Venstre)	5
Total number of members:	12

Mosterøy heradsstyre 1947–1951
Party name (in Nynorsk)	Number of representatives
Labour Party (Arbeidarpartiet)	2
Conservative Party (Høgre)	2
Farmers' Party (Bondepartiet)	2
Liberal Party (Venstre)	6
Total number of members:	12

Mosterøy heradsstyre 1945–1947
Party name (in Nynorsk)	Number of representatives
Labour Party (Arbeidarpartiet)	3
Conservative Party (Høgre)	2
Farmers' Party (Bondepartiet)	2
Liberal Party (Venstre)	5
Total number of members:	12

Mosterøy heradsstyre 1937–1941*
Party name (in Nynorsk)	Number of representatives
Labour Party (Arbeidarpartiet)	2
Conservative Party (Høgre)	4
Farmers' Party (Bondepartiet)	1
Liberal Party (Venstre)	5
Total number of members:	12
Note: Due to the German occupation of Norway during World War II, no elections were held for new municipal councils until after the war ended in 1945.

=== Mayors ===
The mayor (Nynorsk: ordførar) of Mosterøy Municipality was the political leader of the municipality and the chairperson of the municipal council. The following people have held this position:

- 1884–1889: David Nicolaisen Edland
- 1890–1910: Eilert G. Schanche
- 1911–1913: Børre Aske
- 1914–1922: Johan Dirdal
- 1923–1925: Truls Bru
- 1925–1931: Kristian Edland (V)
- 1931–1941: Lars Ramndal (V)
- 1941–1945: Johan Østbø, Jr. (NS)
- 1945–1945: Lars Ramndal (V)
- 1946–1947: Olav Edland (V)
- 1947–1951: Hallvard Hauge
- 1951–1964: Erling Sokn

== See also ==
- List of former municipalities of Norway
