= Rennesøy (island) =

Island in Rogaland, Norway

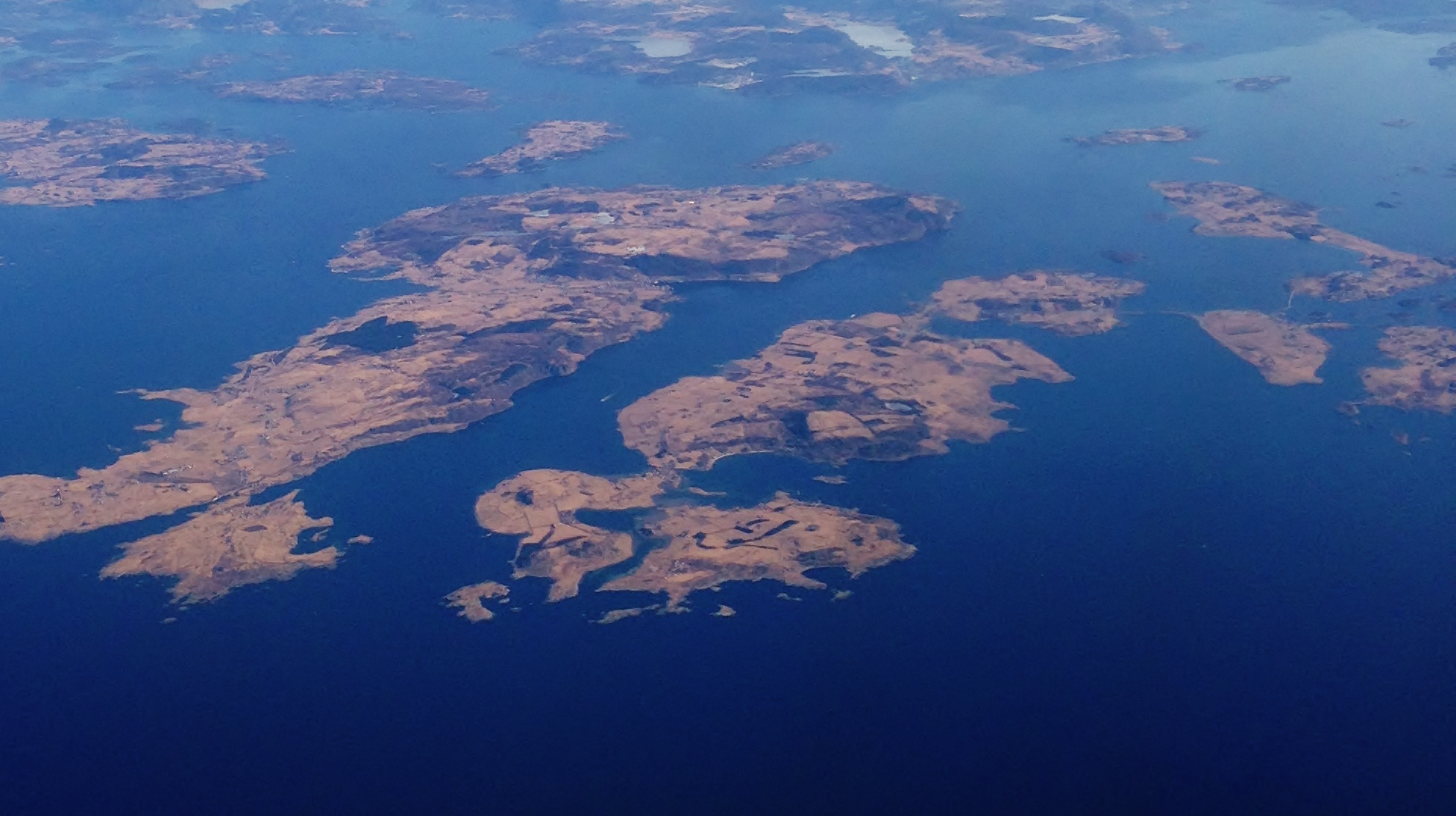
- Rennesøy island is located towards the left side of the aerial view.
- Interactive map of the island

Geography
- Location: Rogaland, Norway
- Coordinates: 59.10556°N 5.69167°E
- Area: 40.7 km^{2} (15.7 sq mi)
- Length: 13.25 km (8.233 mi)
- Width: 5 km (3.1 mi)
- Highest elevation: 234 m (768 ft)
- Highest point: Hodnenuten

Administration
- Norway
- County: Rogaland
- Municipality: Stavanger Municipality

Demographics
- Population: 2835 (2025)

Rennesøy is an island in Stavanger Municipality in Rogaland county, Norway. The 40.7-square-kilometre (15.7 sq mi) island lies on the south side of the Boknafjorden, surrounded by several other islands. The islands of Mosterøy, Klosterøy, and Åmøy lie to the south and Finnøy and Talgje lie to the northeast. The villages of Vikevåg and Sørbø are both located on the island. The Hausken Church is located in Vikevåg and the 900-year old Sørbø Church is located in Sørbø.

Since 1992, the island is connected to the mainland city of Stavanger by a series of bridges and tunnels that are part of the European route E39 highway: the Mastrafjord Tunnel, the Askjesund Bridge, and the Byfjord Tunnel. The island of Rennesøy is also connected to the islands of Finnøy and Talgje to the northeast by the Finnøy Tunnel.

Rennesøy has a steep mountainous area in the southeast, with the 234-metre (768 ft) tall mountain Hodnenuten being the highest point on the mountain. The western part of the island is relatively flat and well cultivated.

== History ==
The island was part of the old Rennesøy Municipality until 1 January 2020 when it became part of Stavanger Municipality.

== See also ==
- List of islands of Norway
