= Rennesøy Municipality =

Former municipality in Rogaland, Norway

Rennesøy Municipality Rennesøy kommune
- Former municipality
- Rennesø herred (historic name)
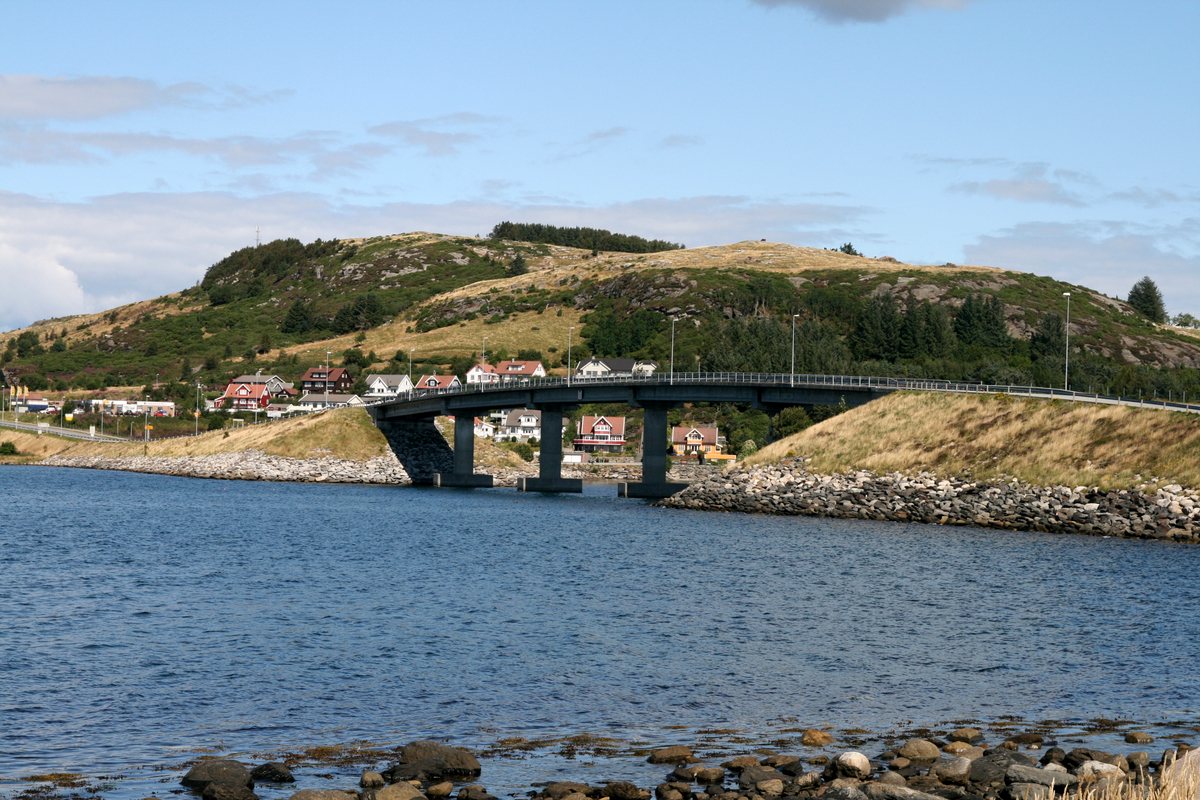
- View of the Askjesund Bridge in Rennesøy

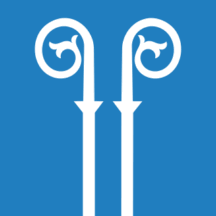
- Flag Coat of arms

- Rogaland within Norway

- Rennesøy within Rogaland
- Coordinates: 59°06′04″N 05°43′55″E
- Country: Norway
- County: Rogaland
- District: Ryfylke
- Established: 1 Jan 1838
  - Created as: Formannskapsdistrikt
- Disestablished: 1 Jan 2020
  - Succeeded by: Stavanger Municipality
- Administrative centre: Vikevåg

Government
  - Mayor (2011): Dagny Sunnanå Hausken (Sp)

Area (upon dissolution)
  - Total: 65.51 km^{2} (25.29 sq mi)
  - Land: 64.90 km^{2} (25.06 sq mi)
  - Water: 0.61 km^{2} (0.24 sq mi) 0.9%
  - Rank: #404 in Norway
- Highest elevation: 233.6 m (766 ft)

Population (2019)
  - Total: 4,847
  - Rank: #207 in Norway
  - Density: 74/km^{2} (190/sq mi)
  - Change (10 years): ▲ +24.7%
- Demonym: Rennesøybu

Official language
  - Norwegian form: Neutral
- Time zone: UTC+01:00 (CET)
  - Summer (DST): UTC+02:00 (CEST)
- ISO 3166 code: NO-1142

Rennesøy is a former municipality in Rogaland county, Norway. The 65.51-square-kilometre (25.29 sq mi) municipality existed from 1838 until its dissolution in 2020. The area is now part of Stavanger Municipality in the traditional district of Ryfylke. The administrative centre was the village of Vikevåg. Other villages in the municipality included Askje and Sørbø. The municipality encompassed a number of islands on the south side of the Boknafjorden, north of the city of Stavanger.

Prior to its dissolution in 2020, the 65.51-square-kilometre (25.29 sq mi) municipality was the 404th largest by area out of the 422 municipalities in Norway. Rennesøy Municipality was the 207th most populous municipality in Norway with a population of about 4,847. The municipality's population density was 74 inhabitants per square kilometre (190/sq mi) and its population had increased by 24.7% over the previous 10-year period.

== General information ==
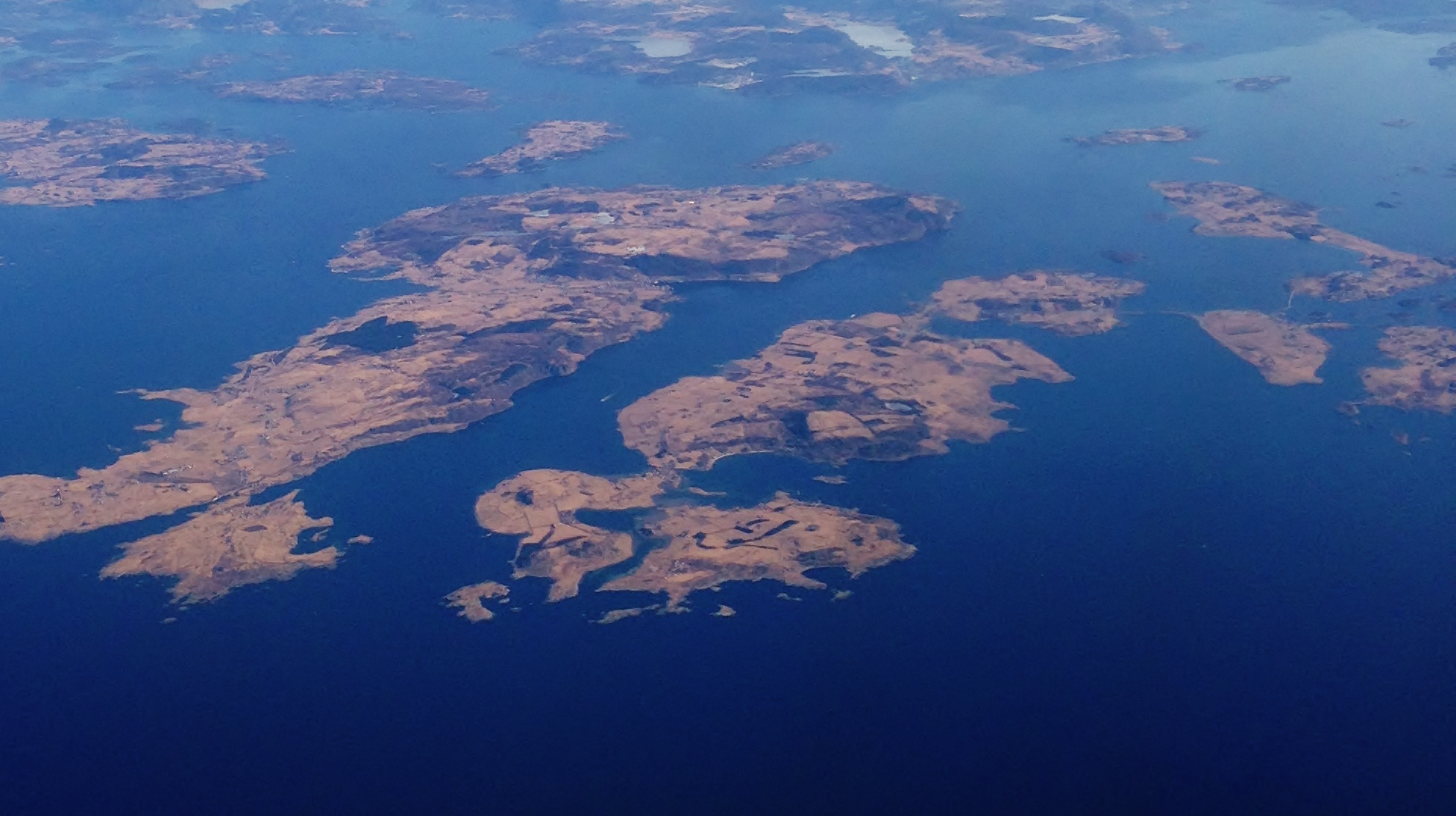
Aerial view of the municipality

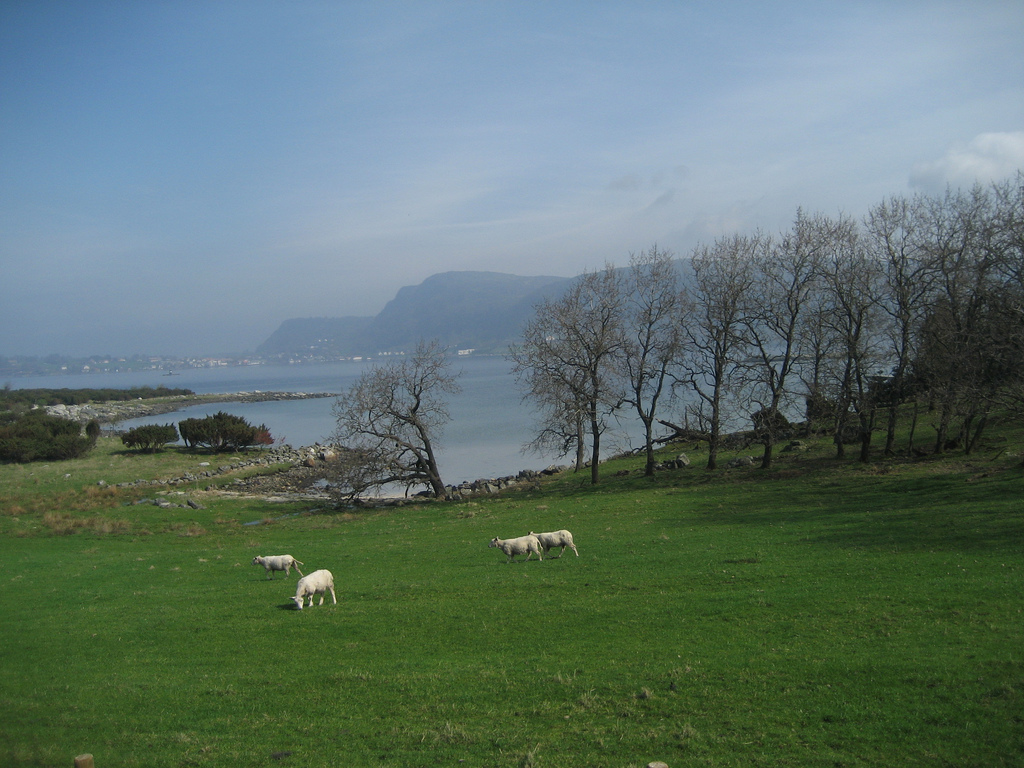
View of a farm on Mosterøy island

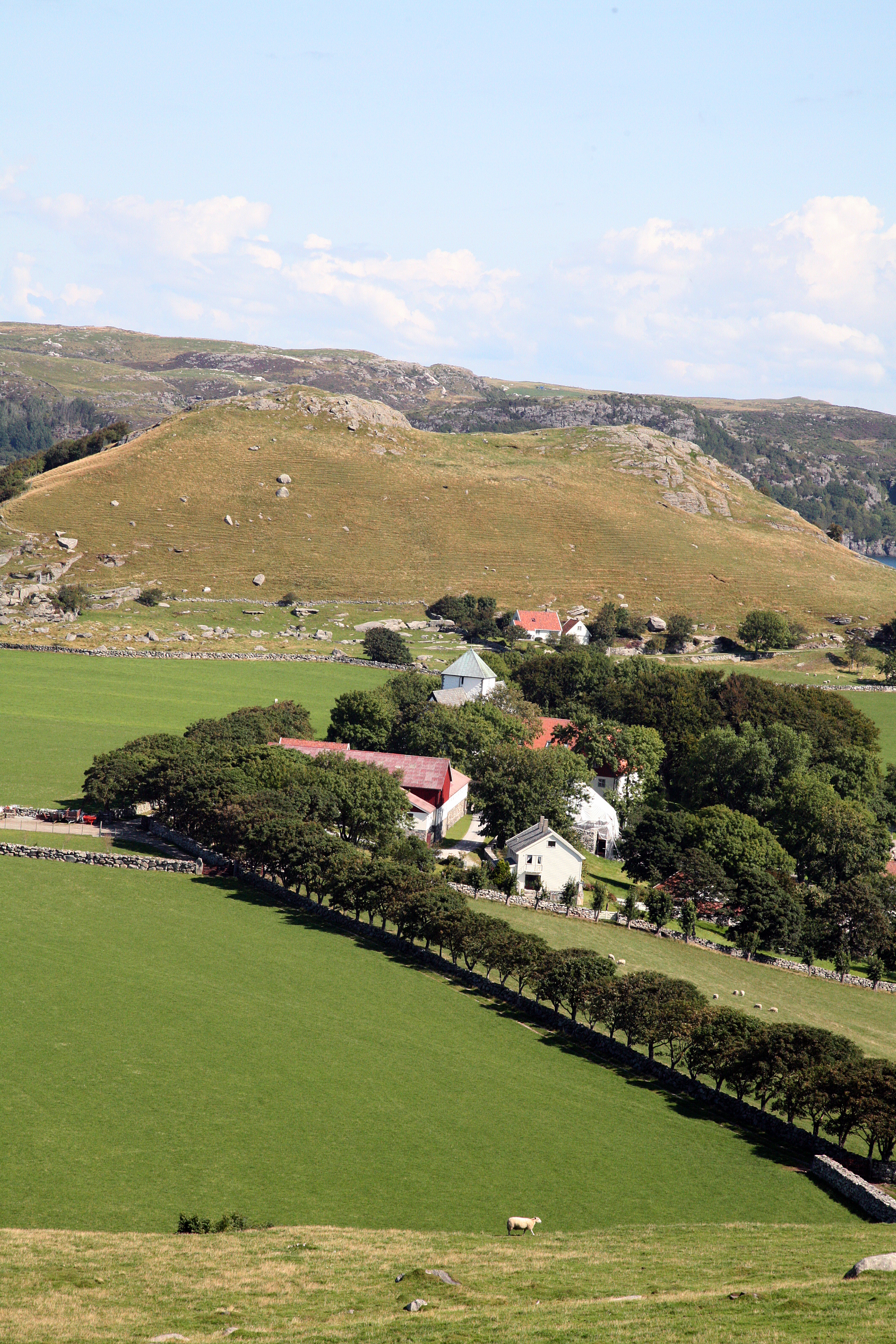
View of the Utstein Abbey on Klosterøy

The parish of Rennesø (later spelled Rennesøy) was established as a municipality on 1 January 1838 (see formannskapsdistrikt law). On 1 July 1884, Rennesøy Municipality was divided in two:

- the islands of Mosterøy, Klosterøy, Fjøløy, Kvitsøy, and the western part of Åmøy (population: 817) became the new Mosterøy Municipality
- the island of Brimse and most of the island of Rennesøy plus some smaller surrounding islets (population: 1,370) remained as a much smaller Rennesøy Municipality (the Hanasand area of the island of Rennesøy belonged to Finnøy Municipality)

The island of Kvitsøy in Mosterøy Municipality later became the independent Kvitsøy Municipality.

On 1 July 1918, the Hanasand area on the island of Rennesøy which belonged to Finnøy Municipality (population: 72) was transferred to Rennesøy Municipality.

During the 1960s, there were many municipal mergers across Norway due to the work of the Schei Committee. On 1 January 1965, Mosterøy Municipality (population: 817) was merged (back) into Rennesøy Municipality. Prior to the merger, Rennesøy Municipality had 1,370 residents.

On 1 January 2020, Rennesøy Municipality, Finnøy Municipality, and Stavanger Municipality were merged into a much larger Stavanger Municipality.

=== Name ===
The municipality (originally the parish) is named after the main island of the municipality, Rennesøy (Old Norse: Rennisøy). The meaning of the first element is unknown. One possibility is that it comes from the word rani which means "snout", likely referring to the shape of the mountain Hodnafjellet on the southeast part of the island. The last element is øy which means "island".

Historically, the name of the municipality was spelled Rennesø. On 3 November 1917, a royal resolution changed the spelling of the name of the municipality to Rennesøy. The letter y was added to the end of the word to "Norwegianize" the name (ø is the Danish word for "island" and øy is the Norwegian word).

=== Coat of arms ===
The coat of arms was granted on 20 February 1981 and in use until the municipal dissolution on 1 January 2020. The official blazon is "Azure, two crosiers addorsed argent" (Norwegian: I blått to oppveksande adosserte sølv krumstavar). This means the arms have a blue field (background) and the charge is a set of two crosiers standing vertically and mirroring each other. The charge has a tincture of argent which means it is commonly colored white, but if it is made out of metal, then silver is used. The blue represents the ocean, an important feature for this island municipality. The crosiers represent the importance of Norway's oldest and best preserved monasteries, Utstein Abbey, located in the municipality. It was originally an Augustinian monastery, its abbot having a crozier as its symbol. Since Basel, Switzerland already had a crozier on its coat of arms, Rennesøy Municipality chose a design with two of them so that it would be different. The arms were designed by Svein Magnus Håvarstein. The municipal flag has the same design as the coat of arms.

=== Churches ===
The Church of Norway had two parishes (sokn) within Rennesøy Municipality. It was part of the Tungenes prosti (deanery) in the Diocese of Stavanger.

Churches in Rennesøy Municipality
Parish (sokn)	Church name	Location of the church	Year built
Mosterøy	Askje Church	Askje, Mosterøy island	1846
Mosterøy	Utstein Church	Klosterøy island	1280
Mosterøy	Vestre Åmøy Chapel	Åmøy island (western side)	1953
Rennesøy	Hausken Church	Vikevåg, Rennesøy island	1857
Rennesøy	Sørbø Church	Sørbø, Rennesøy island	1130

== Geography ==
The island municipality sat on the south side of the large Boknafjorden. It consisted of about 80 islands, most of which were uninhabited. The main islands included Rennesøy, Mosterøy, Klosterøy, Fjøløy, Sokn, Bru, Brimse, and the western part of Åmøy (the eastern part is part of Stavanger Municipality). The highest point in the municipality was the 233.6-metre (766 ft) tall mountain Hodnafjellet on the southeastern coast of the island of Rennesøy.

All of the main islands were connected together and to the mainland by a series of bridges and tunnels (except for Brimse which has a ferry connection). The Fjøløy Lighthouse is located in the northwestern part of the municipality, lighting a main shipping channel to Stavanger.

Tysvær Municipality was located to the north (across the fjord), Finnøy Municipality was located to the northeast, Strand Municipality was located to the east, Stavanger Municipality was located to the south, Randaberg Municipality was located to the southwest, and Kvitsøy Municipality was located to the west.

== Population ==
Historical population
Year	1865	1875	1891	1900	1910	1920	1930	1946	1951	1960	1970	1980	1990	2000	2010	2019
Pop.	2,453	2,477	1,086	1,110	1,003	1,116	1,260	1,485	1,483	1,438	2,079	2,299	2,561	3,111	4,035	4,847
±% p.a.	—	+0.10%	−5.02%	+0.24%	−1.01%	+1.07%	+1.22%	+1.03%	−0.03%	−0.34%	+3.76%	+1.01%	+1.09%	+1.96%	+2.63%	+2.06%
Note: The municipal borders were changed in 1884 and 1965, causing a significant change in the population. Source: Statistics Norway and Norwegian Historical Data Centre

== Government ==
While it existed, Rennesøy Municipality was responsible for primary education (through 10th grade), outpatient health services, senior citizen services, welfare and other social services, zoning, economic development, and municipal roads and utilities. The municipality was governed by a municipal council of directly elected representatives. The mayor was indirectly elected by a vote of the municipal council. The municipality was under the jurisdiction of the Stavanger District Court and the Gulating Court of Appeal.

=== Municipal council ===
The municipal council (Kommunestyre) of Rennesøy Municipality was made up of 21 representatives that were elected to four year terms. The tables below show the historical composition of the council by political party.

Rennesøy kommunestyre 2015–2019
Party name (in Norwegian)	Number of representatives
Labour Party (Arbeiderpartiet)	3
Progress Party (Fremskrittspartiet)	4
Conservative Party (Høyre)	6
Christian Democratic Party (Kristelig Folkeparti)	3
Centre Party (Senterpartiet)	5
Total number of members:	21
Note: On 1 January 2020, Rennesøy Municipality became part of Stavanger Municipality.

Rennesøy kommunestyre 2011–2015
Party name (in Norwegian)	Number of representatives
Labour Party (Arbeiderpartiet)	3
Progress Party (Fremskrittspartiet)	3
Conservative Party (Høyre)	7
Christian Democratic Party (Kristelig Folkeparti)	3
Centre Party (Senterpartiet)	4
Socialist Left Party (Sosialistisk Venstreparti)	1
Total number of members:	21

Rennesøy kommunestyre 2007–2011
Party name (in Norwegian)	Number of representatives
Labour Party (Arbeiderpartiet)	3
Progress Party (Fremskrittspartiet)	5
Conservative Party (Høyre)	5
Christian Democratic Party (Kristelig Folkeparti)	3
Centre Party (Senterpartiet)	3
Common list (Samlingsliste)	2
Total number of members:	21

Rennesøy kommunestyre 2003–2007
Party name (in Norwegian)	Number of representatives
Labour Party (Arbeiderpartiet)	3
Progress Party (Fremskrittspartiet)	5
Conservative Party (Høyre)	5
Christian Democratic Party (Kristelig Folkeparti)	3
Centre Party (Senterpartiet)	3
Common list (Samlingsliste)	2
Total number of members:	21

Rennesøy kommunestyre 1999–2003
Party name (in Norwegian)	Number of representatives
Labour Party (Arbeiderpartiet)	3
Progress Party (Fremskrittspartiet)	3
Conservative Party (Høyre)	2
Christian Democratic Party (Kristelig Folkeparti)	5
Centre Party (Senterpartiet)	2
Common list (Samlingsliste)	4
Cross-party list (Tverrpolitisk liste)	2
Total number of members:	21

Rennesøy kommunestyre 1995–1999
Party name (in Norwegian)	Number of representatives
Labour Party (Arbeiderpartiet)	4
Conservative Party (Høyre)	5
Christian Democratic Party (Kristelig Folkeparti)	4
Centre Party (Senterpartiet)	4
Cross-party list (Tverrpolitisk liste)	4
Total number of members:	21

Rennesøy kommunestyre 1991–1995
Party name (in Norwegian)	Number of representatives
Labour Party (Arbeiderpartiet)	3
Conservative Party (Høyre)	4
Christian Democratic Party (Kristelig Folkeparti)	4
Centre Party (Senterpartiet)	8
Non-party list (Upolitisk liste)	2
Total number of members:	21

Rennesøy kommunestyre 1987–1991
Party name (in Norwegian)	Number of representatives
Labour Party (Arbeiderpartiet)	3
Conservative Party (Høyre)	6
Christian Democratic Party (Kristelig Folkeparti)	5
Centre Party (Senterpartiet)	6
Liberal Party (Venstre)	1
Total number of members:	21

Rennesøy kommunestyre 1983–1987
Party name (in Norwegian)	Number of representatives
Labour Party (Arbeiderpartiet)	4
Conservative Party (Høyre)	6
Christian Democratic Party (Kristelig Folkeparti)	5
Centre Party (Senterpartiet)	6
Total number of members:	21

Rennesøy kommunestyre 1979–1983
Party name (in Norwegian)	Number of representatives
Labour Party (Arbeiderpartiet)	1
Conservative Party (Høyre)	7
Christian Democratic Party (Kristelig Folkeparti)	5
New People's Party (Nye Folkepartiet)	1
Centre Party (Senterpartiet)	7
Total number of members:	21

Rennesøy kommunestyre 1975–1979
Party name (in Norwegian)	Number of representatives
Labour Party (Arbeiderpartiet)	1
Conservative Party (Høyre)	3
Christian Democratic Party (Kristelig Folkeparti)	7
New People's Party (Nye Folkepartiet)	1
Centre Party (Senterpartiet)	9
Total number of members:	21

Rennesøy kommunestyre 1971–1975
Party name (in Norwegian)	Number of representatives
Labour Party (Arbeiderpartiet)	1
Conservative Party (Høyre)	2
Christian Democratic Party (Kristelig Folkeparti)	6
Centre Party (Senterpartiet)	9
Liberal Party (Venstre)	3
Total number of members:	21

Rennesøy kommunestyre 1967–1971
Party name (in Norwegian)	Number of representatives
Labour Party (Arbeiderpartiet)	1
Conservative Party (Høyre)	3
Christian Democratic Party (Kristelig Folkeparti)	5
Centre Party (Senterpartiet)	8
Liberal Party (Venstre)	3
Local List(s) (Lokale lister)	1
Total number of members:	21

Rennesøy kommunestyre 1963–1967
Party name (in Norwegian)	Number of representatives
Christian Democratic Party (Kristelig Folkeparti)	5
Centre Party (Senterpartiet)	4
Joint List(s) of Non-Socialist Parties (Borgerlige Felleslister)	3
Local List(s) (Lokale lister)	1
Total number of members:	13

Rennesøy herredsstyre 1959–1963
Party name (in Norwegian)	Number of representatives
Local List(s) (Lokale lister)	13
Total number of members:	13

Rennesøy herredsstyre 1955–1959
Party name (in Norwegian)	Number of representatives
Local List(s) (Lokale lister)	13
Total number of members:	13

Rennesøy herredsstyre 1951–1955
Party name (in Norwegian)	Number of representatives
Local List(s) (Lokale lister)	13
Total number of members:	13

Rennesøy herredsstyre 1947–1951
Party name (in Norwegian)	Number of representatives
Local List(s) (Lokale lister)	12
Total number of members:	12

Rennesøy herredsstyre 1945–1947
Party name (in Norwegian)	Number of representatives
Local List(s) (Lokale lister)	12
Total number of members:	12

Rennesøy herredsstyre 1937–1941*
Party name (in Norwegian)	Number of representatives
Local List(s) (Lokale lister)	12
Total number of members:	12
Note: Due to the German occupation of Norway during World War II, no elections were held for new municipal councils until after the war ended in 1945.

=== Mayors ===
The mayor (Norwegian: ordfører) of Rennesøy Municipality was the political leader of the municipality and the chairperson of the municipal council. The following people have held this position:

- 1838–1839: Rev. Bernt Tobias Bessesen
- 1840–1841: Asbjørn Pedersen Mehuus
- 1842–1845: Rev. Fredrik William Rode
- 1846–1849: Daniel Nilsen Voufle
- 1850–1857: Willum Jakobsen Hodnefjeld
- 1858–1858: Christopher Johan Garmann
- 1859–1859: Anders Andersen Hægreberg
- 1860–1864: Lars Jakobsen Sørbø
- 1865–1867: Ingebrigt Ingebrigtsen Vold
- 1868–1869: Isak Isaksen Sokn
- 1870–1871: Bendix Eriksen Nordbø
- 1872–1877: Ole Svendsen Oftedahl
- 1878–1879: Bendix Eriksen Nordbø
- 1880–1882: Erik Christensen Oustbø
- 1883–1884: David Nikolaisen Edland
- 1884–1891: Jørgen Jakobsen Haaversteen
- 1892–1913: Jacob Kristensen Austbø
- 1914–1918: Simon Hauge
- 1919–1931: Lars Sørbø
- 1931–1942: Johannes Håverstein
- 1942–194: Johan Østbø, Jr. (NS)
- 1945–1945: Johannes Håverstein
- 1946–1951: Inge Austbø
- 1951–1955: Johannes Håverstein
- 1955–1963: Olav Bø
- 1963–1964: Jakob B. Hanasand
- 1965–1971: Olav Nesheim (Sp)
- 1971–1975: Henry Halvorsen (V)
- 1975–1979: Lars Sokn (Sp)
- 1979–1983: Ole Bø (Sp)
- 1983–1987: Lars Sokn (Sp)
- 1987–1995: Svein Helgesen (KrF)
- 1995–1999: Jan Mikal Hanasand (H)
- 1999–2007: Jostein Eiane (KrF)
- 2007–2011: Ommund Vareberg (H)
- 2011–2019: Dagny Sunnanå Hausken (Sp)

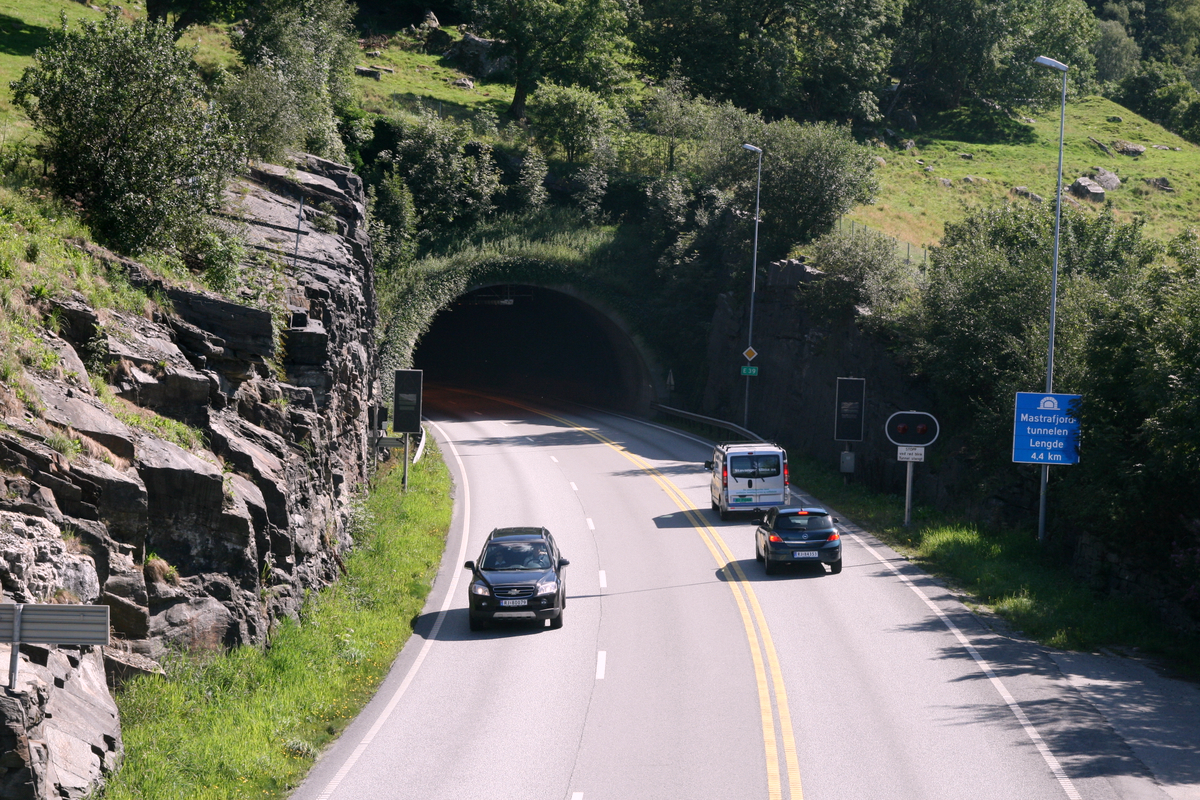
View of the entrance to the Mastrafjord Tunnel

== Transportation ==
Since 1992, Rennesøy Municipality has been connected to the mainland by a series of bridges and undersea tunnels. The Byfjord Tunnel connects the mainland to the island of Sokn, and it is part of the European route E39 highway. The island of Sokn is connected to the three islands of Åmøy, Bru, and Mosterøy by bridges. Mosterøy is connected to Fjøløy and Klosterøy by short bridges and to Rennesøy by the undersea Mastrafjord Tunnel. Rennesøy island is also connected to the island of Vestre Bokn (across the Boknafjorden) by ferry. Furthermore, the island of Rennesøy is connected to the two islands of Finnøy and Talgje in the neighboring Finnøy Municipality to the northeast by the Finnøy Tunnel.

== See also ==
- List of former municipalities of Norway
