= Lars Ramndal =

Norwegian politician (1893–1971)

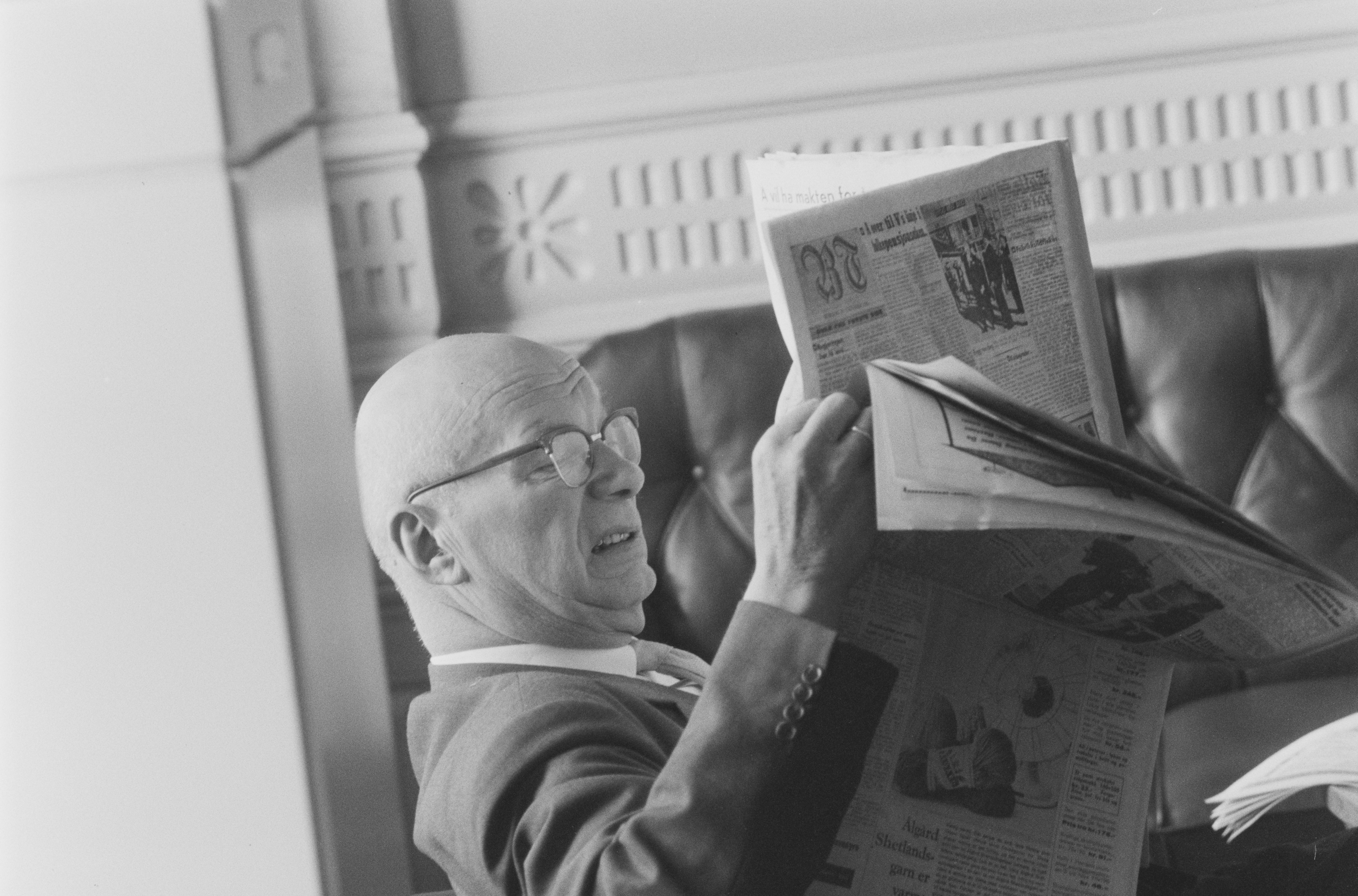
Lars Ramndal

Lars Ramndal (6 May 1893 – 8 November 1971) was a Norwegian politician for the Liberal Party.

He was elected to the Norwegian Parliament from Rogaland in 1945, and was re-elected on four occasions. He had previously been a deputy representative in the periods 1925–1927 (for the Agrarian Party) and 1937–1945.

Ramndal was born in Rennesøy Municipality and served as deputy mayor of Mosterøy Municipality in 1922–1925, and mayor during the terms 1931–1934, 1934–1937, 1937–1941 and 1945.

During the occupation of Norway by Nazi Germany he was arrested in April 1944. He was held in a local prison until being moved to Berg concentration camp, where he remained from 1 June 1944 to the occupation's end in May 1945.
