= Mastrafjord Tunnel =

Subsea road tunnel in Rogaland, Norway

Mastrafjord Tunnel Mastrafjordtunnelen
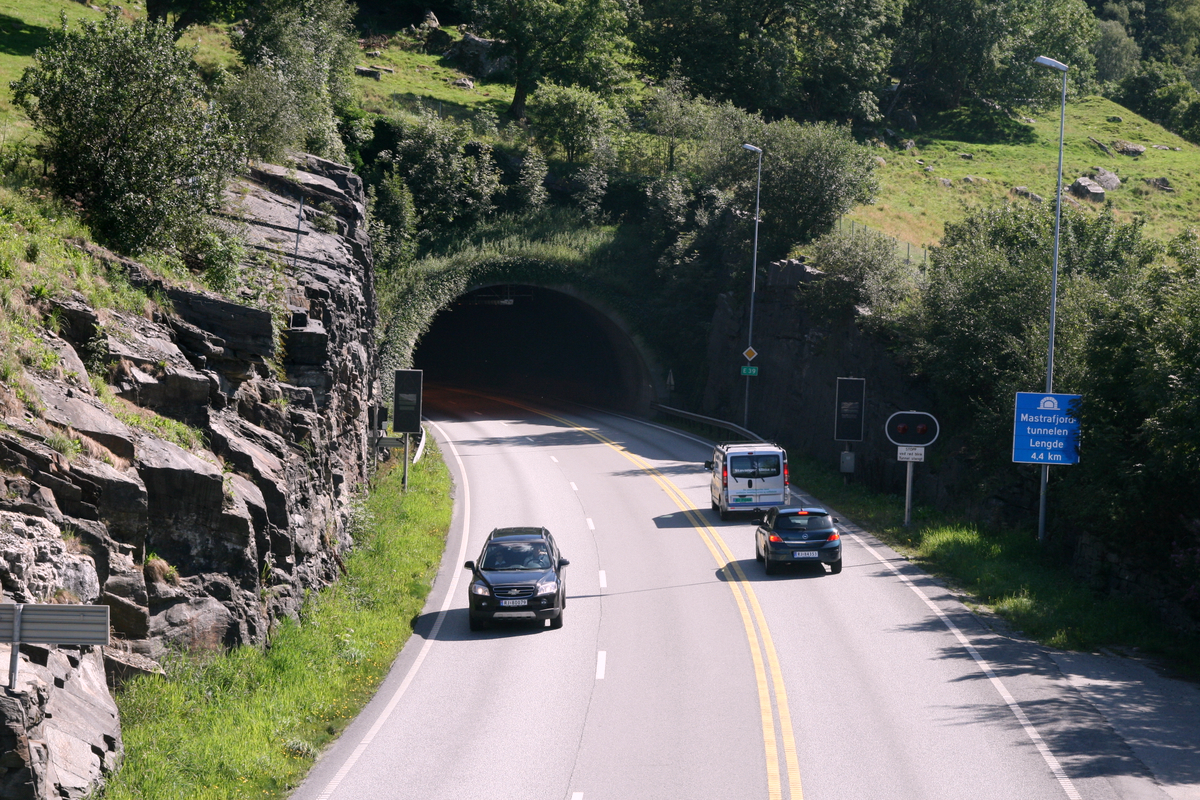
- View of the entrance to the tunnel
- Interactive map of Mastrafjord Tunnel; Mastrafjordtunnelen

Overview
- Location: Rogaland, Norway
- Coordinates: 59°5′0″N 5°41′40″E
- Status: In use
- Route: E39
- Start: Askje
- End: Vikevåg

Operation
- Opened: 30 November 1992
- Operator: Statens vegvesen
- Traffic: Automotive
- Vehicles per day: 7,400

Technical
- Length: 4,424 m (2.75 mi)
- No. of lanes: 3
- Min elevation: −133 metres (−436 ft)
- Grade: 8%

The Mastrafjord Tunnel (Norwegian: Mastrafjordtunnelen) is a subsea road tunnel in Stavanger Municipality in Rogaland county, Norway. The 4,424-metre (2.75 mi) long tunnel runs under the Mastrafjorden, which flows between the islands of Mosterøy and Rennesøy. The tunnel opened in 1992 as part of the European route E39 highway and the Rennesøy Fixed Link (which also includes the Byfjord Tunnel). The southern end of the tunnel is located near the village of Askje on Mosterøy and the northern end of the tunnel is in the village of Vikevåg on Rennesøy. With a maximum grade of 8%, the tunnel reaches its deepest point at 133 metres (436 ft) below sea level.
