= Austre Åmøy Chapel =

Church in Rogaland, Norway

- Austre Åmøy kapell
- Austre Åmøy Chapel
- 59.039384°N 5.754466°E
- Location: Stavanger Municipality, Rogaland
- Country: Norway
- Denomination: Church of Norway
- Churchmanship: Evangelical Lutheran

History
- Status: Chapel
- Founded: 1904
- Consecrated: 1904

Architecture
- Functional status: Active
- Architect: Jæger
- Architectural type: Long church
- Style: 120
- Completed: 1904

Specifications
- Materials: Wood

Administration
- Diocese: Stavanger bispedømme
- Deanery: Tungenes prosti
- Parish: Mosterøy

Austre Åmøy Chapel (Norwegian: Austre Åmøy kapell) is a chapel of the Church of Norway in Stavanger Municipality in Rogaland county, Norway. It is located on the eastern part of the small island of Åmøy. It is an annex chapel in the Mosterøy parish which is part of the Tungenes prosti (deanery) in the Diocese of Stavanger. The wooden chapel was built in a long church style in 1904 using designs by the architect Jæger. The chapel seats about 120 people.

== History ==
Historically, the island of Åmøy was divided between two different municipalities and two different parishes. This chapel was part of Stavanger Municipality and the Vardeneset parish which was part of the Ytre Stavanger prosti. The other half of the island was the site of Vestre Åmøy Chapel. That chapel was located in Rennesøy Municipality and part of the Mosterøy parish which was part of the Tungenes prosti.

The small chapel was constructed in 1904. In 1914, a choir was added to the west end of the building. In 1938, a small tower was added on the roof. The tower was rebuilt in 1978.

On 1 January 2020, the two municipalities were merged into Stavanger Municipality. On the same date, the Austre Åmøy chapel was transferred to the Mosterøy parish in Tungenes prosti.

== See also ==
- List of churches in Rogaland
