= Åmøy =

Island in Stavanger, Norway

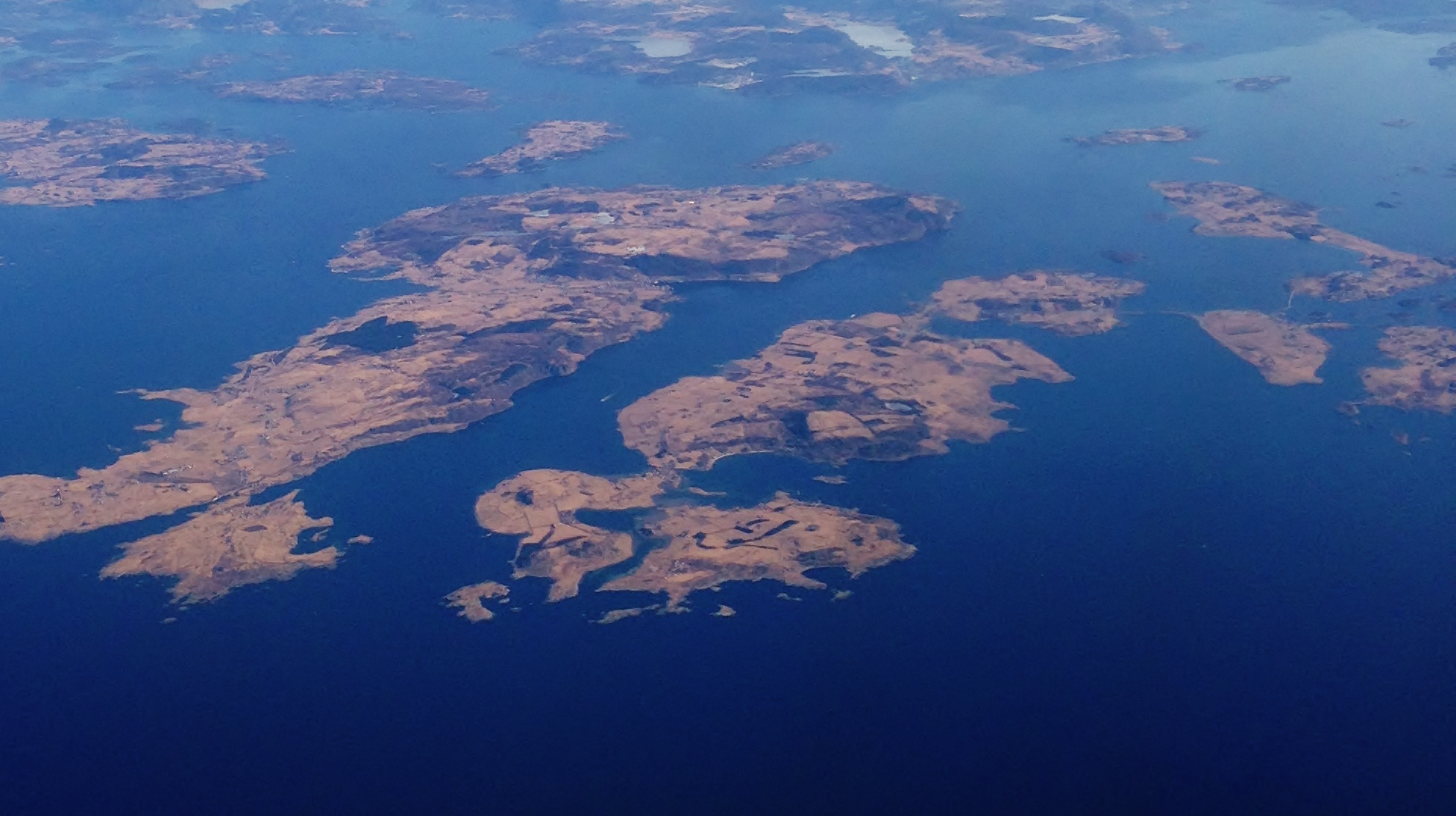
- Åmøy (top, right corner)
- Interactive map of the island

Geography
- Location: Rogaland, Norway
- Coordinates: 59.04039°N 5.73394°E
- Area: 5.3 km^{2} (2.0 sq mi)
- Length: 5.5 km (3.42 mi)
- Width: 1.5 km (0.93 mi)

Administration
- Norway
- County: Rogaland
- Municipality: Stavanger Municipality

Demographics
- Population: 629 (2022)
- Pop. density: 119/km^{2} (308/sq mi)

Åmøy is an island in Stavanger Municipality in Rogaland county, Norway. The 5.3-square-kilometre (2.0 sq mi) island lies just north of the city of Stavanger in a group of islands. The islands of Sokn and Bru both lie to the west of Åmøy and the islands of Mosterøy and Rennesøy lie to the north, and the island of Hidle (in Strand Municipality) lies to the east.

== Geography ==
The island is a long, narrow island with a very narrow isthmus in the middle. Historically, the island was divided between two municipalities. The western part of the island (Vestre Åmøy) was part of Rennesøy Municipality and the eastern part (Austre Åmøy) was part of Stavanger Municipality. Both halves of the island had their own chapel, Austre Åmøy Chapel and Vestre Åmøy Chapel. In 2014, there were 618 people living on the island with 328 living on the Rennesøy part and the remaining 290 people living in the Stavanger part. In 2020, all of Rennesøy Municipality was merged into Stavanger Municipality. Åmøy sorts under the borough of Tasta in Stavanger.

The island was served by local boats for many years. In 1992, Åmøy was connected to the mainland via road bridge to the island of Sokn, with further connection to the subsea Byfjord Tunnel.

== History ==
Nearly 1,000 rock carvings, dated from the Bronze Age, are found at the island. Among the picture motifs are people, animals, fish, ships and tools. Ostensibly, the Meling farm, claims to have the "largest concentration of rock carvings in Rogaland." Larger petroglyph fields are signed and open to the public. It is claimed that they were the product of a "cult" that viewed "the sun [as] an animating factor." Many varieties of ships appear, and are evidently a significant religious symbol — metaphorically interpreted as symbols of holiness, power, and means of transportation to the sun and divinity. There have also been found prehistoric sites from the Stone Age and Iron Age, including burial mounds and foundations for living houses and boathouses.

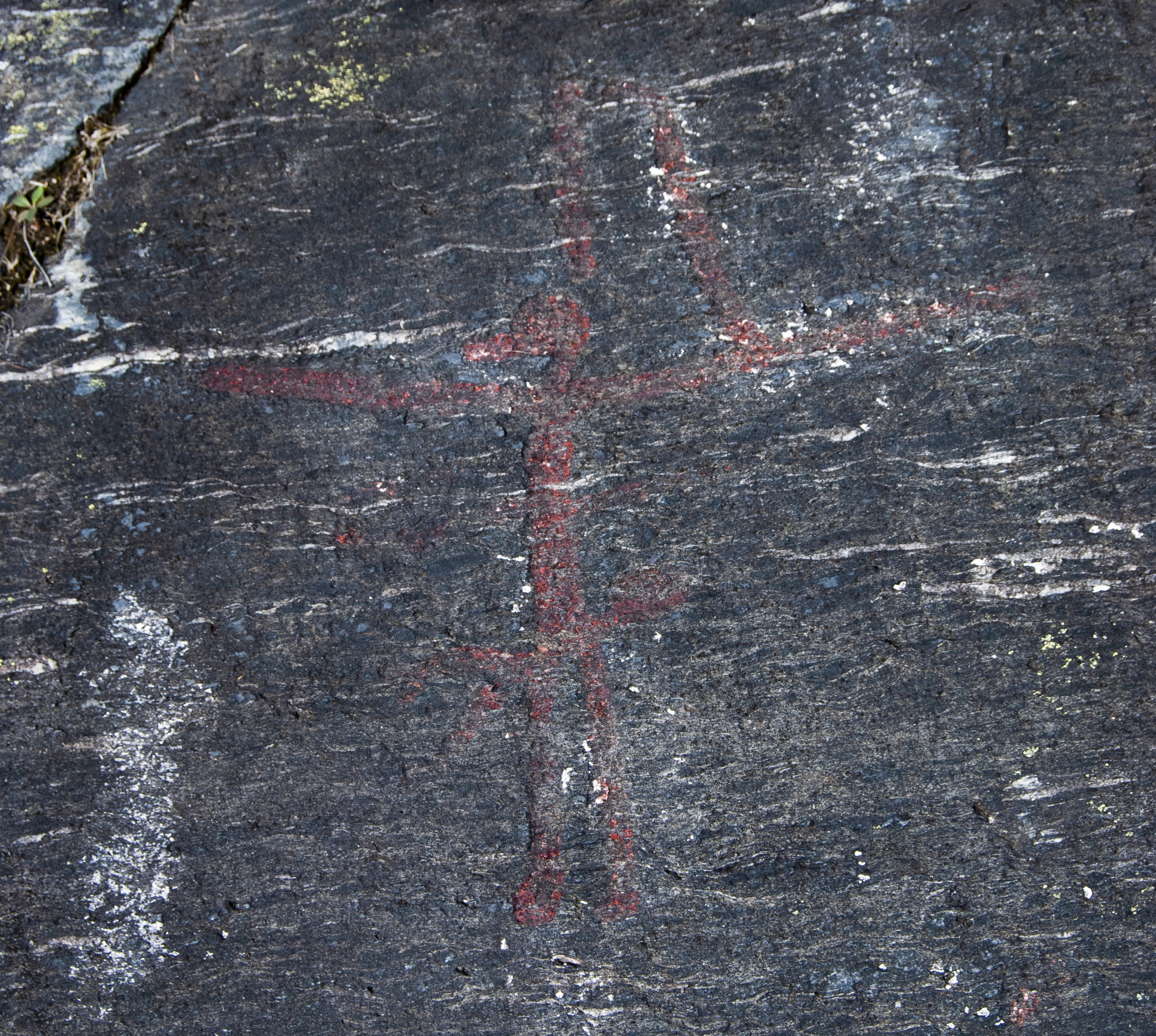
Human-like figure from the rock carvings at Austre Åmøy

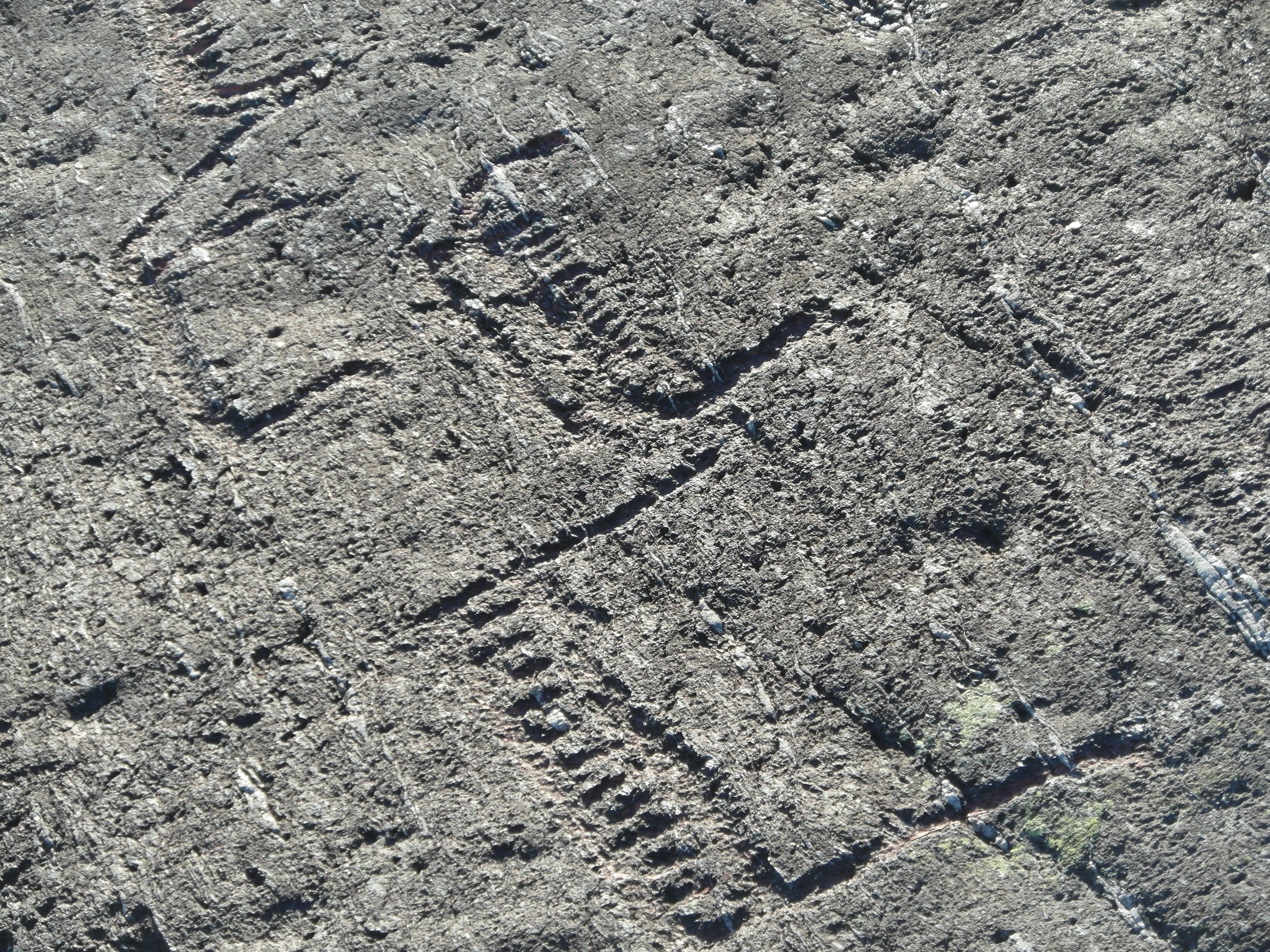
Rock carvings of ships from field IV at Meling, Åmøy. The field Meling – Åmøy IV has at least 33 figures, mostly ships.

== See also ==
- List of islands of Norway
