= Klosterøy =

Island in Stavanger, Norway

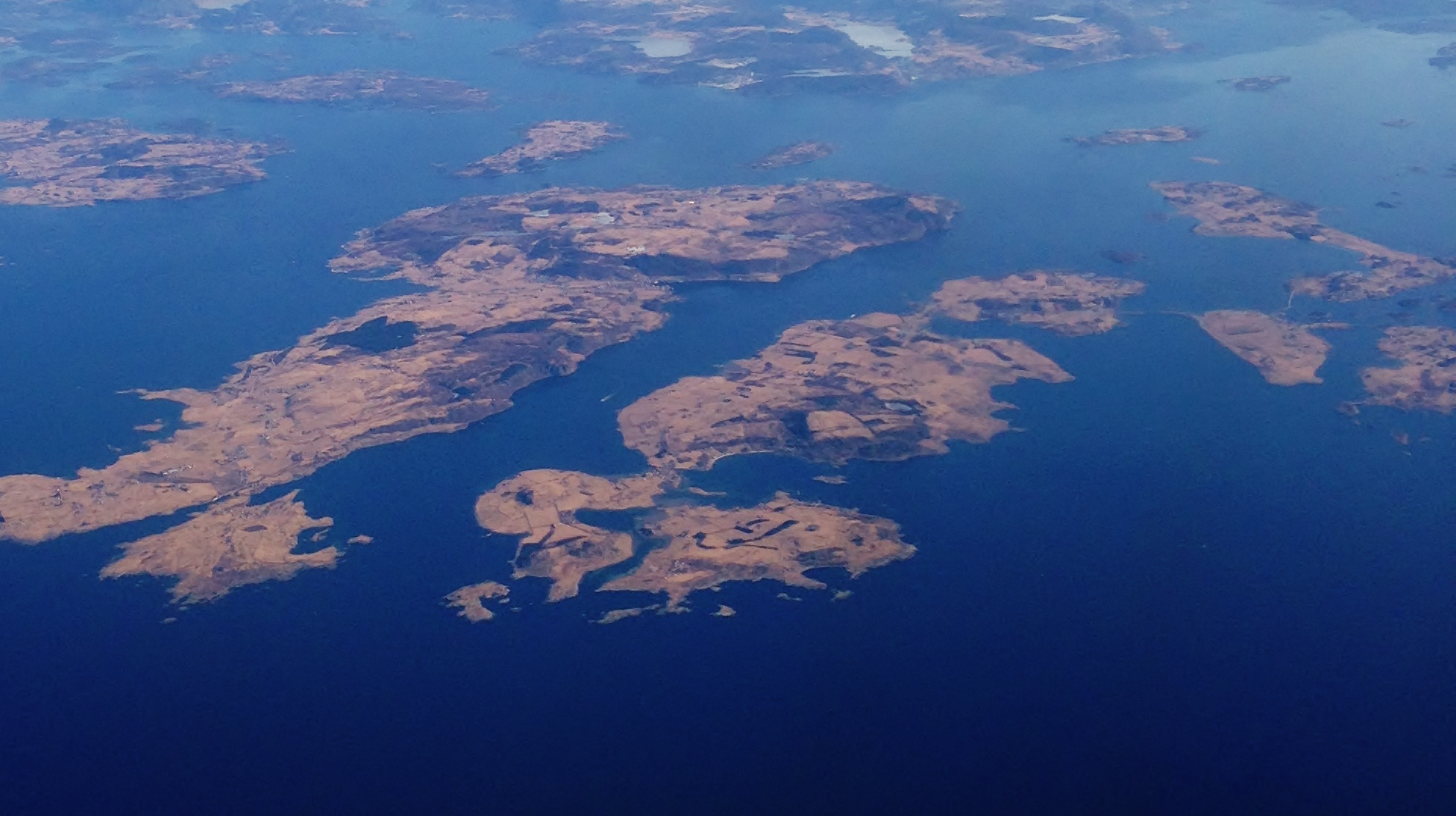
- Small S-shaped island in center, front of picture
- Interactive map of the island

Geography
- Location: Rogaland, Norway
- Coordinates: 59.10388°N 5.58888°E
- Area: 1.7 km^{2} (0.66 sq mi)
- Length: 2.5 km (1.55 mi)
- Width: 1 km (0.6 mi)
- Highest elevation: 79 m (259 ft)
- Highest point: Knebberfjellet

Administration
- Norway
- County: Rogaland
- Municipality: Stavanger Municipality

Klosterøy is an island in Stavanger Municipality in Rogaland county, Norway.

The 1.7-square-kilometre (0.66 sq mi) island lies on the south side of the Boknafjorden in the Rennesøy island group. It lies immediately north of the island of Fjøløy and immediately west of the island of Mosterøy. All three islands are connected by bridges and Mosterøy is connected to the island of Sokn which in turn is connected to the city of Stavanger on the mainland by the Byfjord Tunnel.

Klosterøy island is notable since it is the location of the historic Utstein Abbey and the 800-year old Utstein Church. Most of the island is agricultural land, with most residents living on the far eastern end of the island, along the small channel separating the island from Mosterøy.

== History ==
The island was part of the old Rennesøy Municipality until 1 January 2020 when it became part of Stavanger Municipality.

== See also ==
- List of islands of Norway
