= Bru, Rogaland =

Island in Rogaland, Norway

Bru
- Interactive map of the island

Geography
- Location: Rogaland, Norway
- Coordinates: 59.04143°N 5.64381°E
- Area: 3 km^{2} (1.2 sq mi)
- Highest elevation: 92 m (302 ft)
- Highest point: Brufjellet

Administration
- Norway
- County: Rogaland
- Municipality: Stavanger Municipality

Demographics
- Population: 514
- Pop. density: 171.3/km^{2} (443.7/sq mi)

Bru is an island in Stavanger Municipality in Rogaland county, Norway. The 3-square-kilometre (1.2 sq mi) island lies south of the Boknafjorden, just off the coast of the Stavanger Peninsula, along the Byfjorden. The highest point on the island is the 92-metre (302 ft) tall mountain, Brufjellet. The island sits in a group of islands with Sokn and Mosterøy to the north and Åmøy to the east.

The island has a road connection to the mainland. There is a bridge on the northeast side of the Bru connecting it to the island of Sokn, to the north. Sokn is connected to the mainland by the Byfjord Tunnel, part of the European route E39 highway. The tunnel actually passes below the island of Bru on its way to the city of Stavanger.

The island is populated, mostly on the eastern side in what is referred to as the village of Bru. There is a growing population of commuters who live on the island and work in the nearby city of Stavanger. The soil is cultivated on the eastern part of the island, while the western part is mainly moorland. Most farmers on the island keep sheep.

== History ==
The island was part of the old Rennesøy Municipality until 1 January 2020 when it became part of Stavanger Municipality.

== See also ==
- List of islands of Norway
