= Askje =

Village in Stavanger Municipality, Norway

- Village
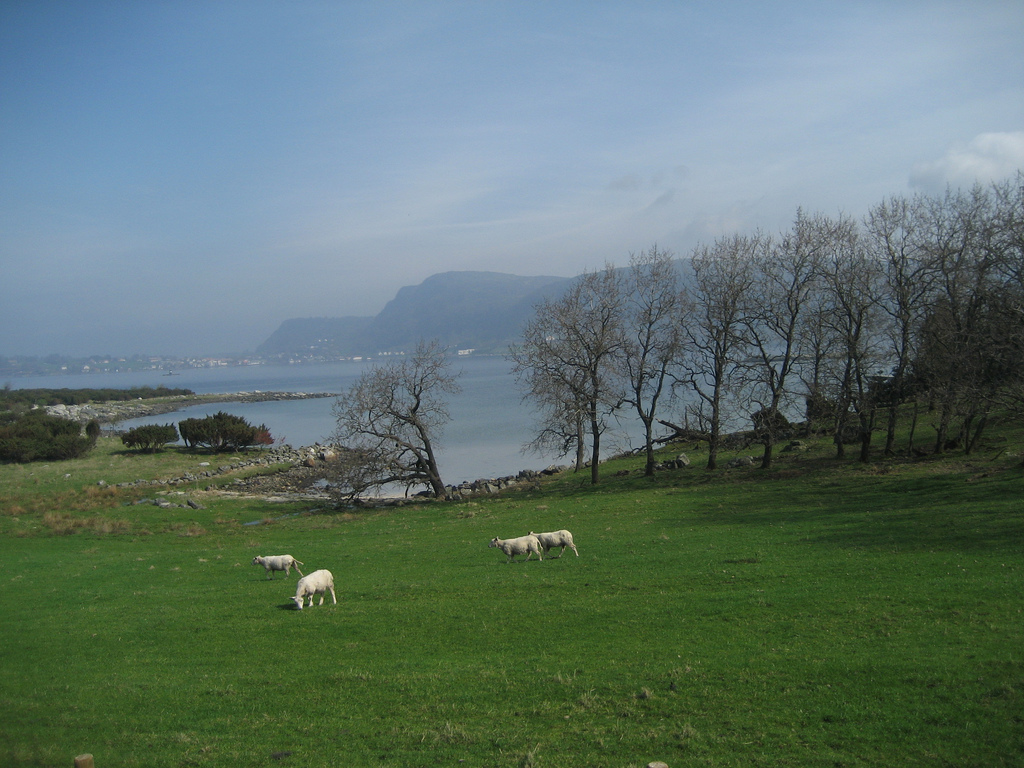
- View of the village area
- Interactive map of Askje
- Coordinates: 59.06644°N 5.69041°E
- Country: Norway
- Region: Western Norway
- County: Rogaland
- District: Ryfylke
- Municipality: Stavanger Municipality

Area
  - Total: 0.27 km^{2} (0.10 sq mi)
- Elevation: 34 m (112 ft)

Population (2025)
  - Total: 637
  - Density: 2,359/km^{2} (6,110/sq mi)
- Time zone: UTC+01:00 (CET)
  - Summer (DST): UTC+02:00 (CEST)
- Post Code: 4156 Mosterøy

Askje is a village in Stavanger Municipality in Rogaland county, Norway. The small, coastal farming and fishing village is located on the southeastern end of the island of Mosterøy. The small village is the site of the Askje Church.

The 0.27-square-kilometre (67-acre) village has a population (2025) of 637 and a population density of 2,359 inhabitants per square kilometre (6,110/sq mi).

== History ==
The village was historically part of the old Rennesøy Municipality until 1884 when it became part of the new Mosterøy Municipality. On 1 January 1965, Mosterøy Municipality merged back into Rennesøy Municipality. On 1 January 2020 it became part of the newly-enlarged Stavanger Municipality.
