= Vikevåg =

Village in Stavanger Municipality, Norway

- Village
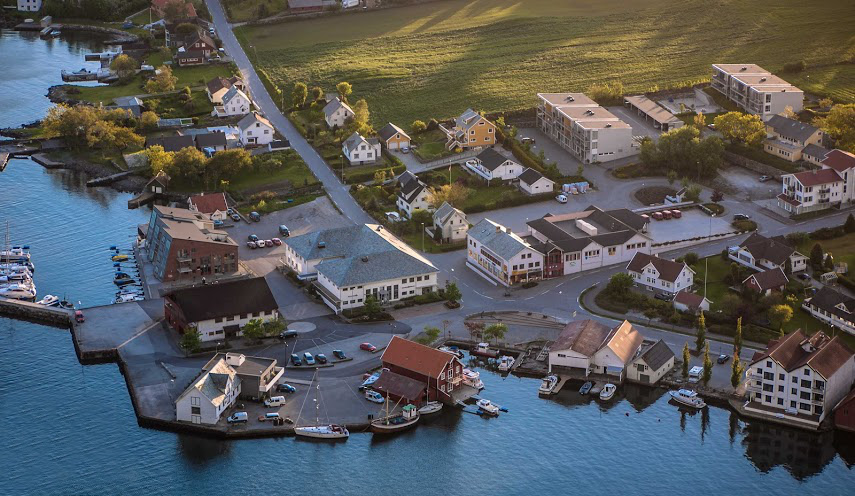
- View of the village
- Interactive map of Vikevåg
- Coordinates: 59.09754°N 5.69788°E
- Country: Norway
- Region: Western Norway
- County: Rogaland
- District: Ryfylke
- Municipality: Stavanger Municipality

Area
  - Total: 0.62 km^{2} (0.24 sq mi)
- Elevation: 2 m (6.6 ft)

Population (2025)
  - Total: 1,008
  - Density: 1,626/km^{2} (4,210/sq mi)
- Time zone: UTC+01:00 (CET)
  - Summer (DST): UTC+02:00 (CEST)
- Post Code: 4150 Rennesøy

Vikevåg is a village in the large Stavanger Municipality in Rogaland county, Norway. The village is located on the south side of the island of Rennesøy. The northern end of the Mastrafjord Tunnel lies at Vikevåg. The tunnel is part of the European route E39 highway. Hausken Church is located in Vikevåg.

The 0.62-square-kilometre (150-acre) village has a population (2025) of 1,008 and a population density of 1,626 inhabitants per square kilometre (4,210/sq mi).

== History ==
Prior to 2020, the village was the administrative centre of the old Rennesøy Municipality. On 1 January 2020, the island became part of the newly-enlarged Stavanger Municipality.
