= Sørbø =

Village in Stavanger Municipality, Norway

- Village
- Interactive map of Sørbø
- Coordinates: 59.12821°N 5.63652°E
- Country: Norway
- Region: Western Norway
- County: Rogaland
- District: Ryfylke
- Municipality: Stavanger Municipality
- Elevation: 15 m (49 ft)
- Time zone: UTC+01:00 (CET)
  - Summer (DST): UTC+02:00 (CEST)
- Post Code: 4150 Rennesøy

Sørbø is a village in Stavanger Municipality in Rogaland county, Norway. The village is located along the Boknafjorden on the northwestern shore of the island of Rennesøy to the northeast of the large city of Stavanger. The village sits along the European route E39 highway and it is the location of the Sørbø Church. There has been a church at this site since the year 1130.

== History ==
The village was part of the old Rennesøy Municipality until 1 January 2020 when it was merged into the newly-enlarged Stavanger Municipality.
