= Sokn =

Island in Rogaland, Norway

- Interactive map of the island

Geography
- Location: Rogaland, Norway
- Coordinates: 59.05354°N 5.66326°E
- Length: 2.25 km (1.398 mi)
- Width: 1.2 km (0.75 mi)
- Highest elevation: 22 m (72 ft)
- Highest point: Hodnet

Administration
- Norway
- County: Rogaland
- Municipality: Stavanger Municipality

Sokn is an island in Stavanger Municipality in Rogaland county, Norway. The 1.31-square-kilometre (0.51 sq mi) island lies in a group of islands on the south side of the Boknafjorden, just east of the city of Stavanger. There are several islands surrounding Sokn: Bru to the southwest, Åmøy to the southeast, and Mosterøy to the north. All three islands are connected to Sokn by bridges, and the undersea Byfjord Tunnel has its northern terminus on the island, connecting all these islands to the mainland.

Most of the island is covered with farms or moorland, with most of the population living along the southeastern shore.

== History ==
The island of Sokn was part of the old Rennesøy Municipality for a long time, but in 1884 it became a part of the new Mosterøy Municipality which encompassed the island plus several surrounding islands. This independent municipality existed until 1965 when it was merged back into Rennesøy Municipality. Then in 2020, the island became a part of the newly-enlarged Stavanger Municipality.

== See also ==
- List of islands of Norway
