= Vestre Åmøy Chapel =

Church in Rogaland, Norway

- Vestre Åmøy kapell
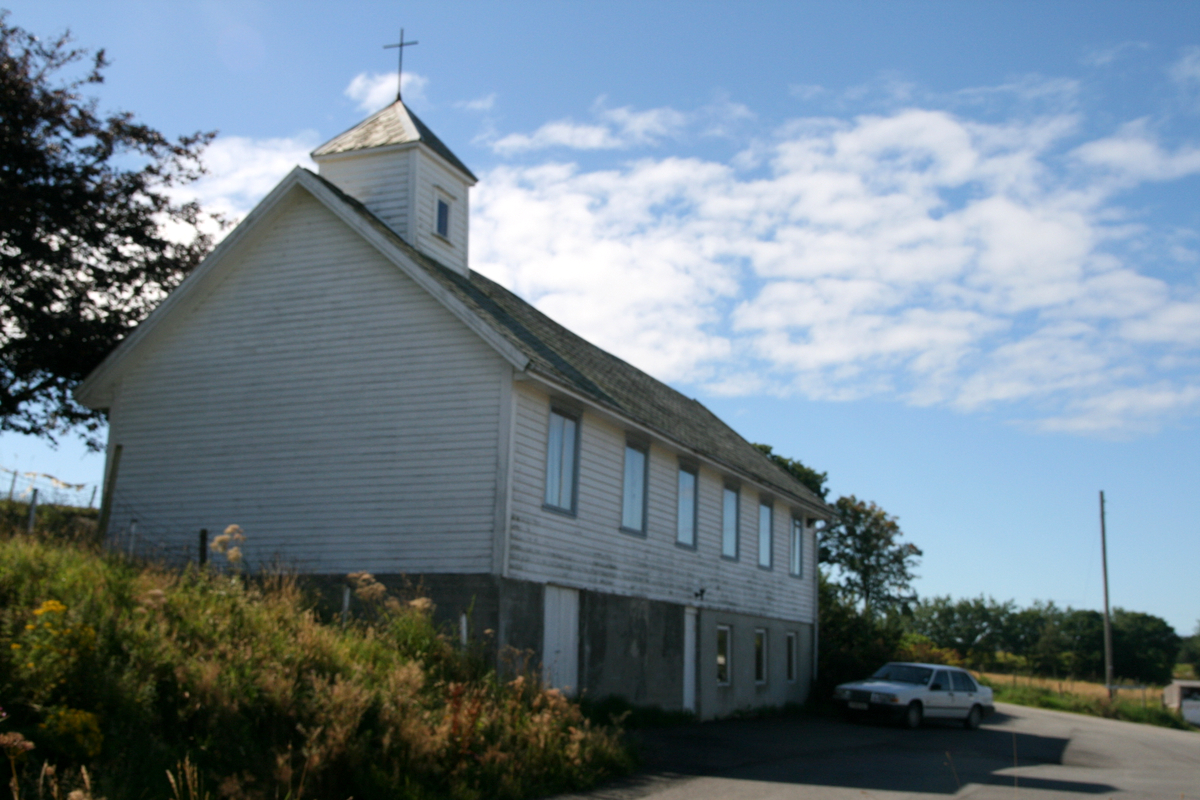
- View of the chapel
- Vestre Åmøy Chapel
- 59.038255°N 5.694579°E
- Location: Stavanger Municipality, Rogaland
- Country: Norway
- Denomination: Church of Norway
- Churchmanship: Evangelical Lutheran

History
- Status: Chapel
- Founded: 1953
- Consecrated: 1953

Architecture
- Functional status: Active
- Architectural type: Long church
- Completed: 1953

Specifications
- Capacity: 80
- Materials: Wood

Administration
- Diocese: Stavanger bispedømme
- Deanery: Tungenes prosti
- Parish: Mosterøy

Vestre Åmøy Chapel (Norwegian: Vestre Åmøy kapell) is a chapel of the Church of Norway in Stavanger Municipality in Rogaland county, Norway. It is located on the western end of the small island of Åmøy. It is an annex chapel in the Mosterøy parish which is part of the Tungenes prosti (deanery) in the Diocese of Stavanger. The white, wooden chapel was built in a long church style in 1953 using designs by an unknown architect. The chapel seats about 80 people. The building was renovated in 1980.

== History ==
Historically, the island of Åmøy was divided between two different municipalities and two different parishes. This chapel was part of Rennesøy Municipality and the Mosterøy parish which was part of the Tungenes prosti. The other half of the island was the site of Austre Åmøy Chapel. That chapel was located in Stavanger Municipality and part of the Vardeneset parish which was part of the Ytre Stavanger prosti. On 1 January 2020, the two municipalities were merged into Stavanger Municipality. On the same date, the Austre Åmøy chapel was transferred to the Mosterøy parish in Tungenes prosti.

== See also ==
- List of churches in Rogaland
