= Fjøløy =

Island in Rogaland, Norway

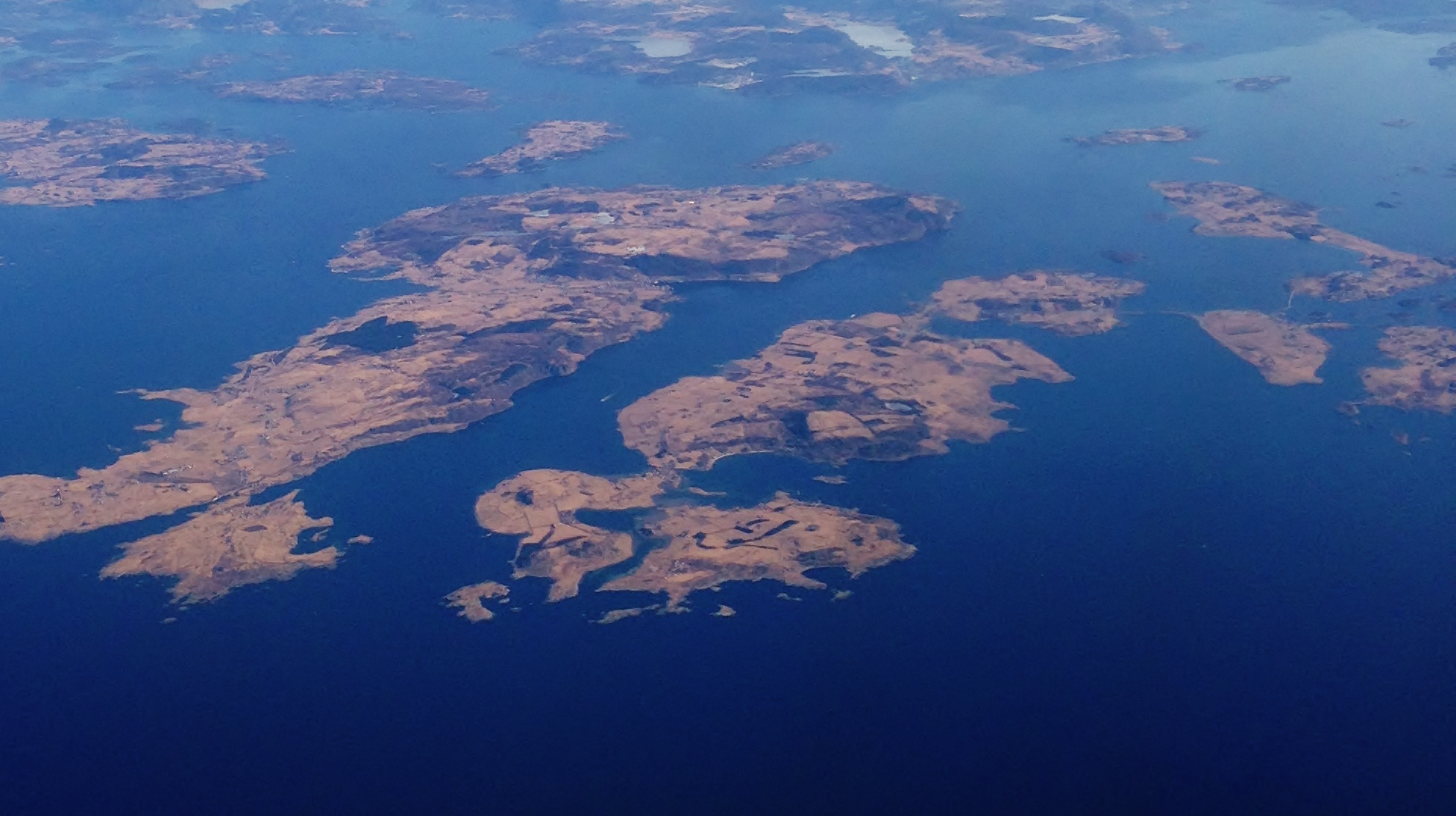
- Fjøløy (center, foreground)
- Interactive map of the island

Geography
- Location: Rogaland, Norway
- Coordinates: 59.09194°N 5.58081°E
- Area: 2.1 km^{2} (0.81 sq mi)
- Length: 2 km (1.2 mi)
- Width: 1.7 km (1.06 mi)
- Highest elevation: 85 m (279 ft)
- Highest point: Storevarden

Administration
- Norway
- County: Rogaland
- Municipality: Stavanger Municipality

Fjøløy is an island in Stavanger Municipality in Rogaland county, Norway. The 2.1-square-kilometre (0.81 sq mi) island lies on the south side of the Boknafjorden in the Rennesøy island group. The island lies immediately south of the island of Klosterøy and west of the island of Mosterøy. The island is connected to the mainland city of Stavanger by a series of bridges and tunnels. The Fjøløy Lighthouse is located on the western end of the island.

== History ==
The island was part of the old Rennesøy Municipality until 1 January 2020 when it became part of Stavanger Municipality.

== See also ==
- List of islands of Norway
