= Askje Church =

Church in Rogaland, Norway

- Askje kirke
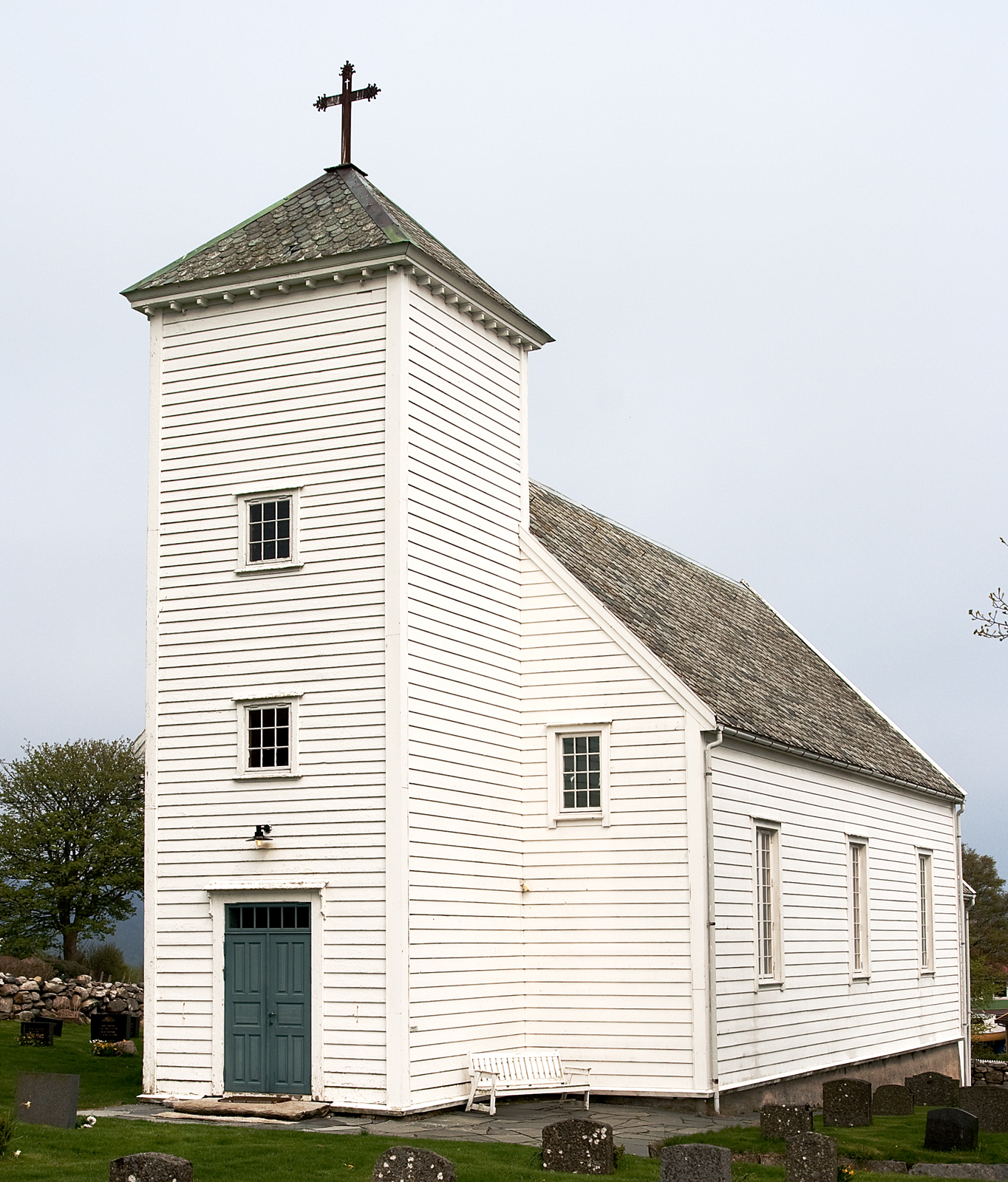
- View of the church
- Askje Church
- 59.063760°N 5.68705°E
- Location: Stavanger Municipality, Rogaland
- Country: Norway
- Denomination: Church of Norway
- Churchmanship: Evangelical Lutheran

History
- Status: Parish church
- Founded: 13th century
- Consecrated: 1846

Architecture
- Functional status: Active
- Architect: Hans Linstow
- Architectural type: Long church
- Completed: 1846

Specifications
- Capacity: 220
- Materials: Wood

Administration
- Diocese: Stavanger bispedømme
- Deanery: Tungenes prosti
- Parish: Mosterøy
- Norwegian Cultural Heritage Site
- Type: Church
- Status: Automatically protected
- ID: 84980

Askje Church (Norwegian: Askje kirke) is a parish church of the Church of Norway in the large Stavanger Municipality in Rogaland county, Norway. It is located in the village of Askje on the island of Mosterøy. It is the main church for the Mosterøy parish which is part of the Tungenes prosti (deanery) in the Diocese of Stavanger. The white, wooden church was built in a long church design in 1846 using designs by the architect Hans Linstow. The church seats about 220 people.

== History ==
The earliest existing historical records of the church date back to the year 1381, but the church was likely established in the 13th century. The original church may have been a stave church. Over the centuries, the church was partially rebuilt. In 1815, the parish priest described the small, dilapidated church as follows: "Askøe church can hardly be distinguished from the farm's outbuildings. It is so small that when one stands on either side of the aisle, it is difficult for another to get past without turning sideways." The small, old church was torn down in 1846 and replaced on the same site with a new church. The new church was consecrated in 1846.

== See also ==
- List of churches in Rogaland
