= Sørbø Church =

Church in Rogaland, Norway

- Sørbø kirke
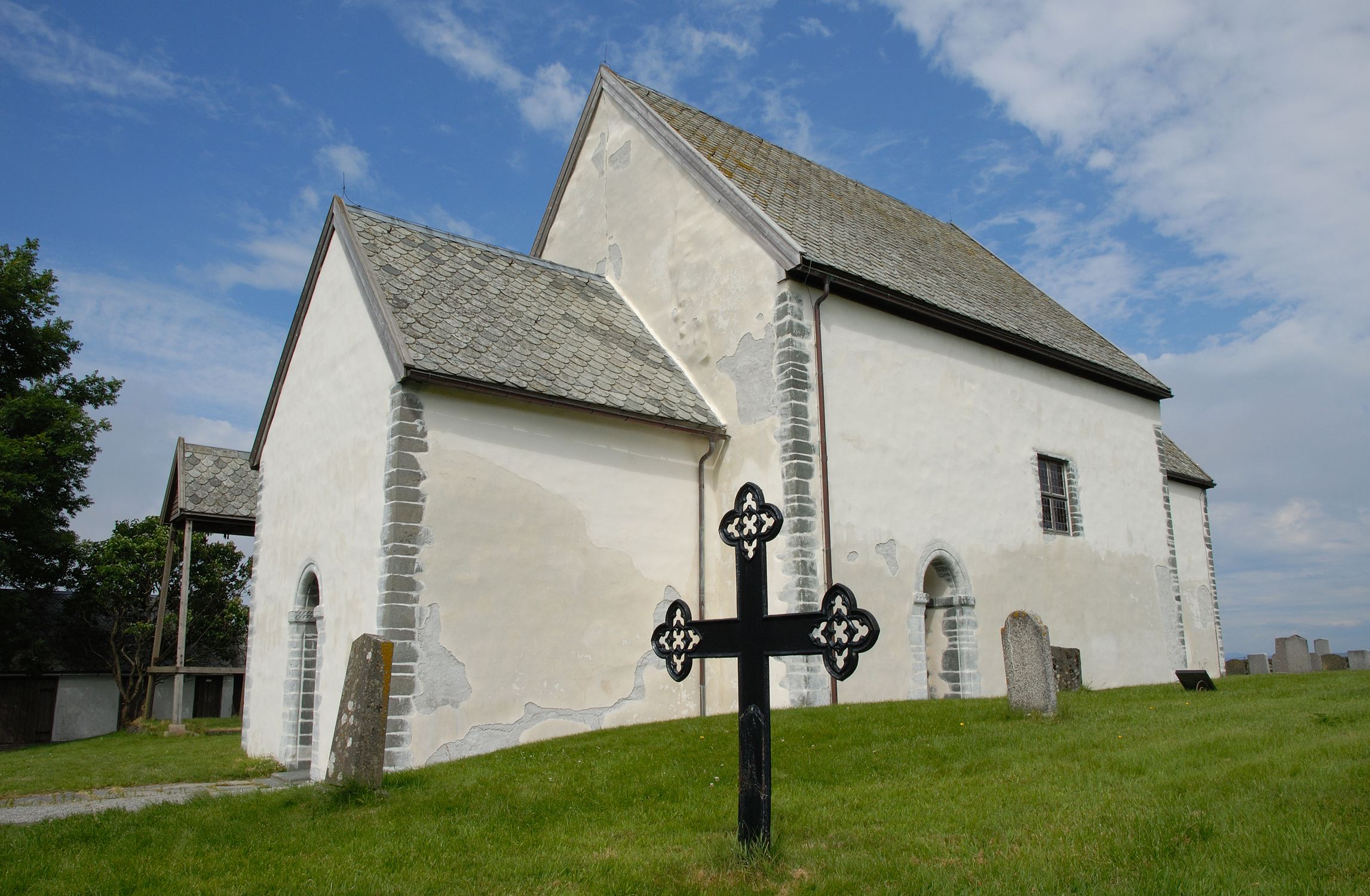
- View of the church
- Sørbø Church
- 59.12786°N 5.643626°E
- Location: Stavanger Municipality, Rogaland
- Country: Norway
- Denomination: Church of Norway
- Previous denomination: Catholic Church
- Churchmanship: Evangelical Lutheran

History
- Status: Parish church
- Founded: c. 1140
- Consecrated: c. 1140

Architecture
- Functional status: Active
- Architectural type: Long church
- Style: Romanesque
- Completed: c. 1140

Specifications
- Capacity: 150
- Materials: Stone

Administration
- Diocese: Stavanger bispedømme
- Deanery: Tungenes prosti
- Parish: Rennesøy
- Norwegian Cultural Heritage Site
- Type: Church
- Status: Automatically protected
- ID: 85046

Sørbø Church (Norwegian: Sørbø kirke) is a parish church of the Church of Norway in the large Stavanger Municipality in Rogaland county, Norway. It is located in the village of Sørbø on the island of Rennesøy. It is one of the two churches for the Rennesøy parish which is part of the Tungenes prosti (deanery) in the Diocese of Stavanger. The medieval stone church was built as a royal chapel in a long church design around the year 1130 using designs by an unknown architect. The church seats about 150 people.

== History ==
The earliest existing historical records of the church date back to the year 1280, but it was likely built around the year 1140. The Romanesque stone church has a rectangular nave and narrower, rectangular chancel. According to tradition, the church was owned for a time by Queen Margrete Skulesdatter. During the restoration in 1883, the windows were greatly expanded and given a neo-Gothic shape, and the steeple which had stood on the roof for hundreds of years was removed. The church was restored in again in 1966, under the leadership of Håkon Christie. Windows and portal openings, which had been greatly expanded in the 19th century, were then restored to their original form and size, including the use of the medieval frame stones, which had been preserved. The stone altar in the choir is the only thing left of the original inventory. The baptismal font is also from the Middle Ages, but the rest of the furniture is newer.

== Media gallery ==
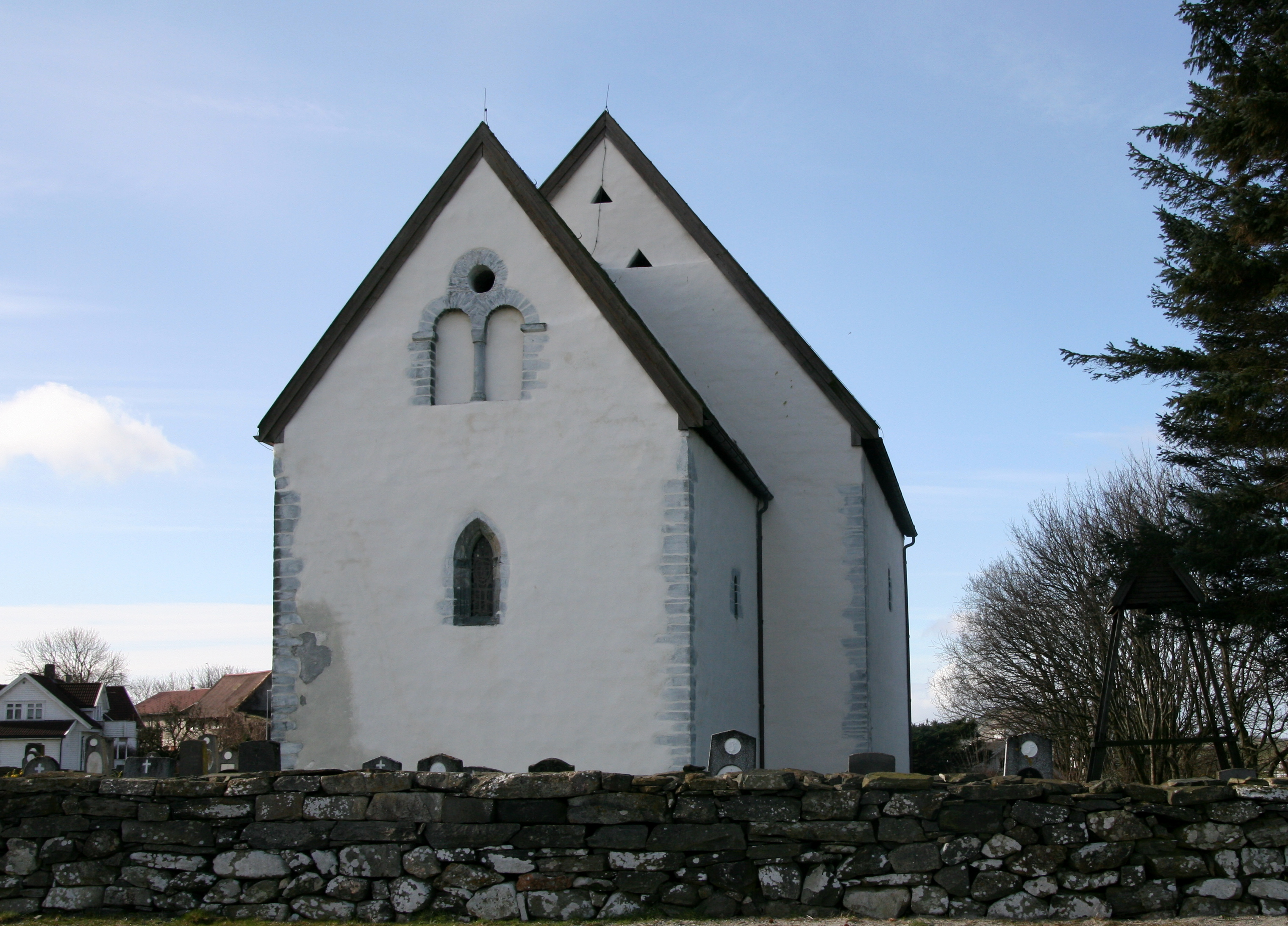

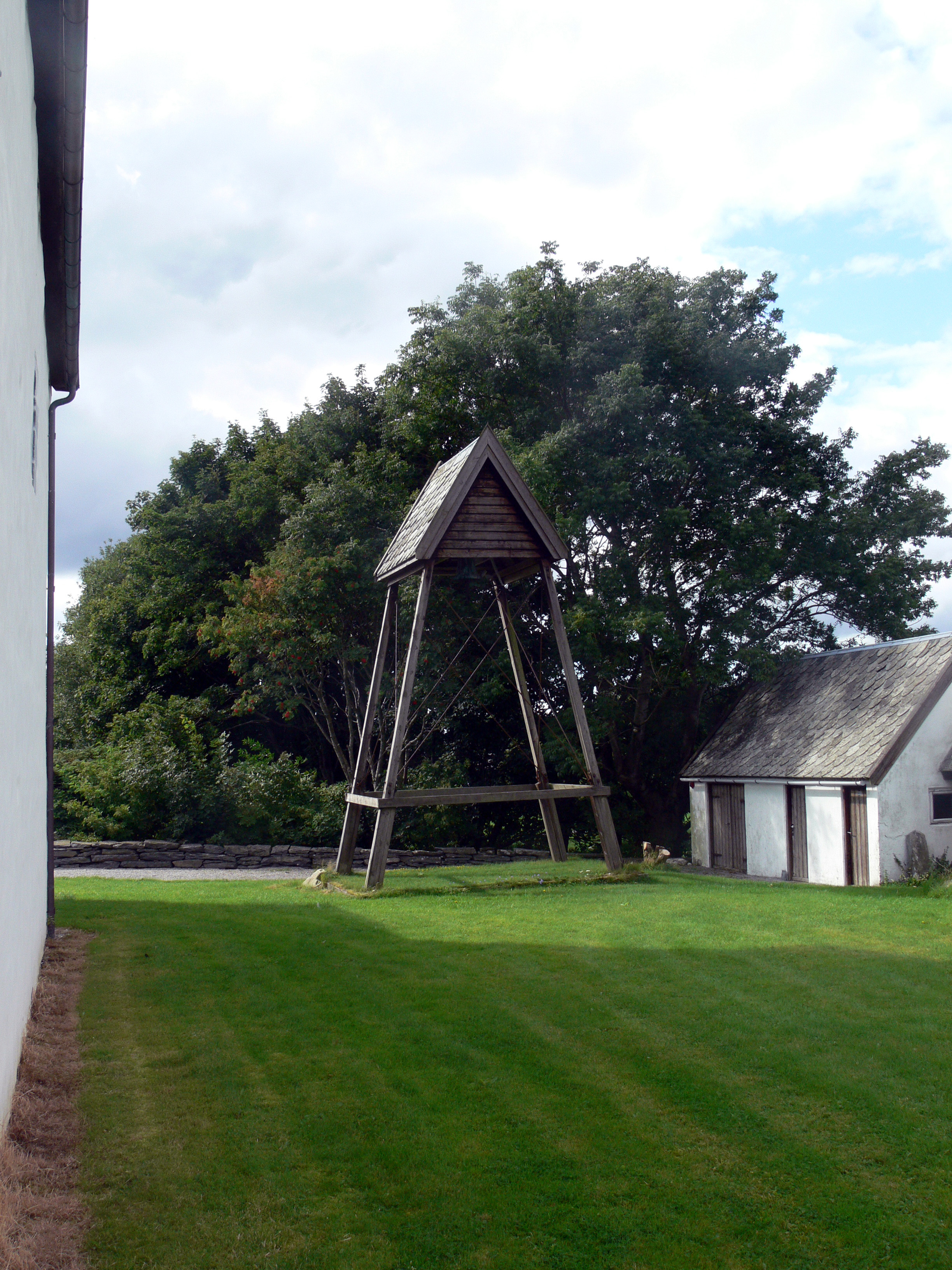

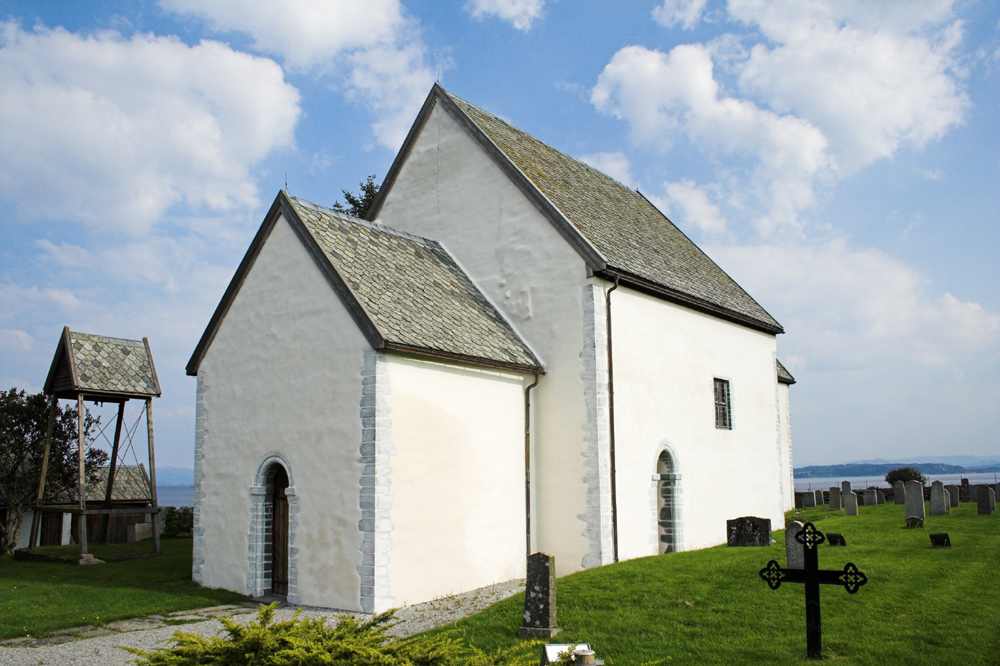

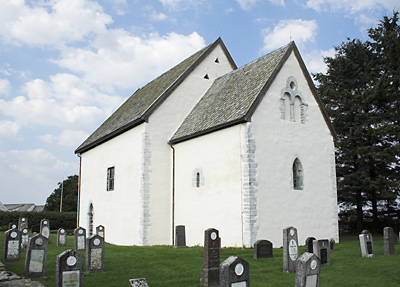

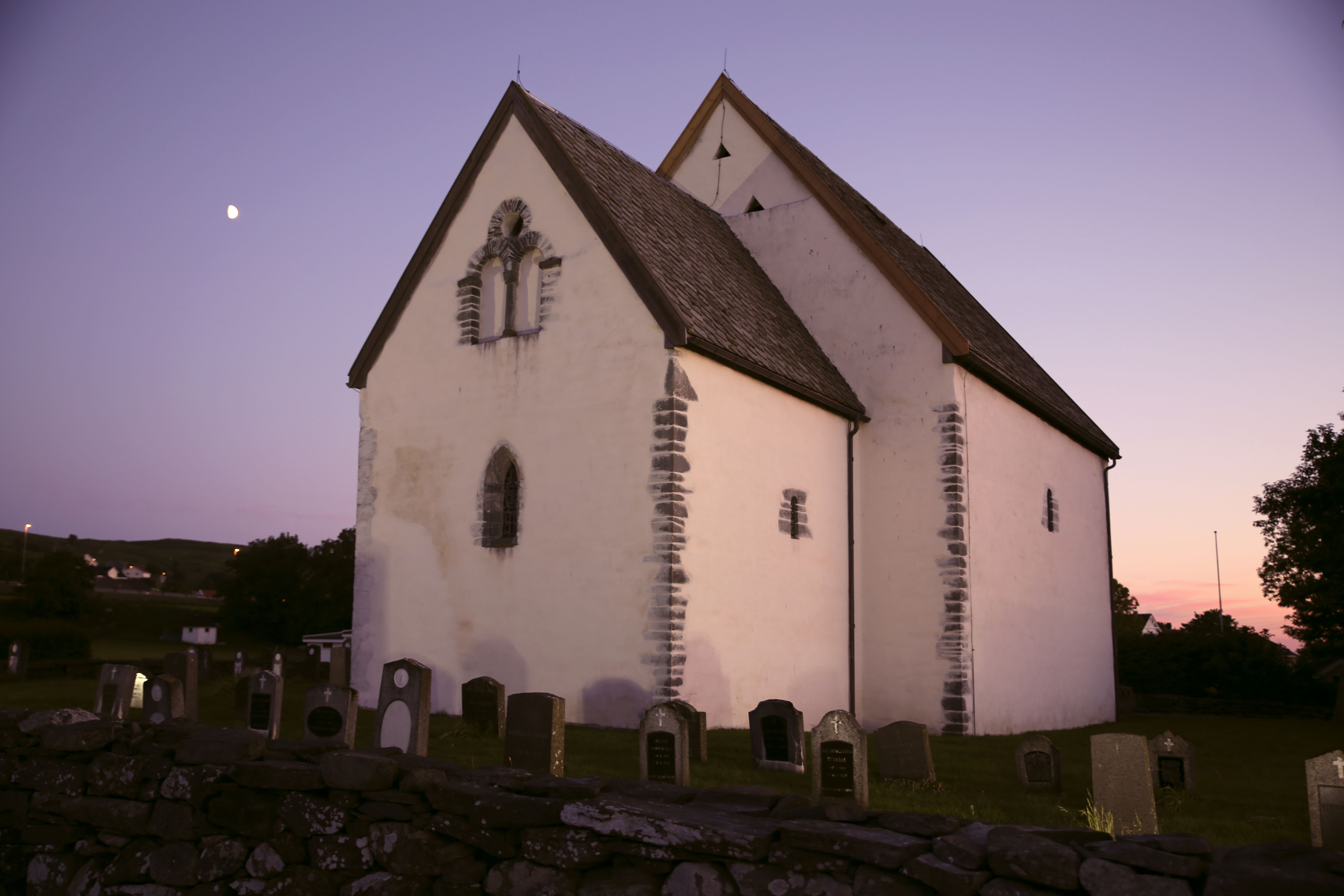

== See also ==
- List of churches in Rogaland
