= Hausken Church =

Church in Rogaland, Norway

- Hausken kyrkje
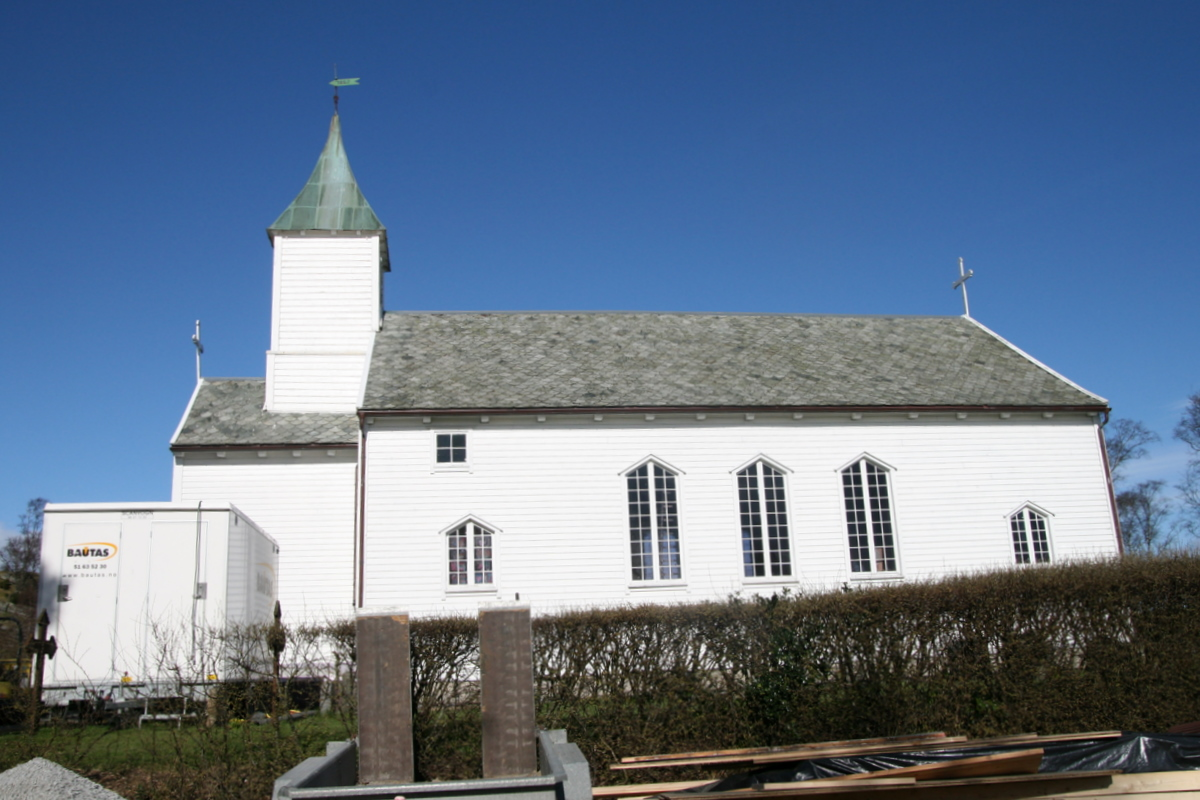
- View of the church
- Hausken Church
- 59.10058°N 5.68888°E
- Location: Stavanger Municipality, Rogaland
- Country: Norway
- Denomination: Church of Norway
- Churchmanship: Evangelical Lutheran

History
- Status: Parish church
- Founded: 13th century
- Consecrated: 1857

Architecture
- Functional status: Active
- Architect: Christian Heinrich Grosch
- Architectural type: Long church
- Completed: 1857

Specifications
- Capacity: 250
- Materials: Wood

Administration
- Diocese: Stavanger bispedømme
- Deanery: Tungenes prosti
- Parish: Rennesøy
- Norwegian Cultural Heritage Site
- Type: Church
- Status: Not protected
- ID: 84509

Hausken Church (Norwegian: Hausken kyrkje) is a parish church of the Church of Norway in the large Stavanger Municipality in Rogaland county, Norway. It is located in the village of Vikevåg on the island of Rennesøy. It is one of the two churches for the Rennesøy parish which is part of the Tungenes prosti (deanery) in the Diocese of Stavanger. The white, wooden church was built in a long church design in 1857 using designs by the architect Christian Heinrich Grosch. The church seats about 250 people.

== History ==
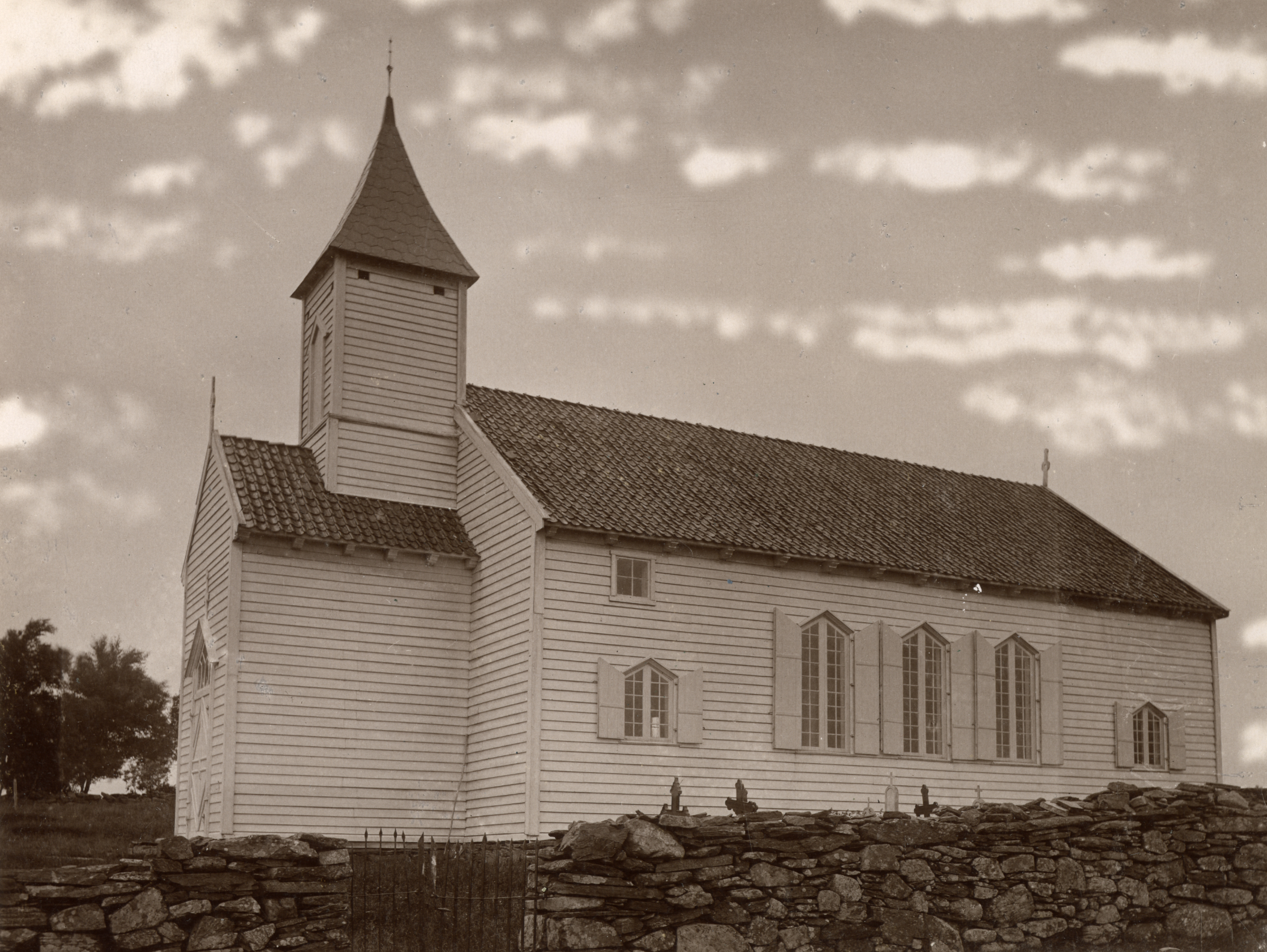
Old picture of the present church

The earliest existing historical records of the church date back to the year 1327, but the church was not built that year. The original church was a stave church. In 1752, the old church was heavily renovated. The nave was torn down and rebuilt, but the old choir was retained.

In 1814, this church served as an election church (Norwegian: valgkirke). Together with more than 300 other parish churches across Norway, it was a polling station for elections to the 1814 Norwegian Constituent Assembly which wrote the Constitution of Norway. This was Norway's first national elections. Each church parish was a constituency that elected people called "electors" who later met together in each county to elect the representatives for the assembly that was to meet at Eidsvoll Manor later that year.

In 1857, the entire church was torn down because it was too small for the congregation. A new church was built the same year on the same site. That church is still in use.

== See also ==
- List of churches in Rogaland
