= Mosterøy (island) =

Island in Stavanger, Rogaland, Norway

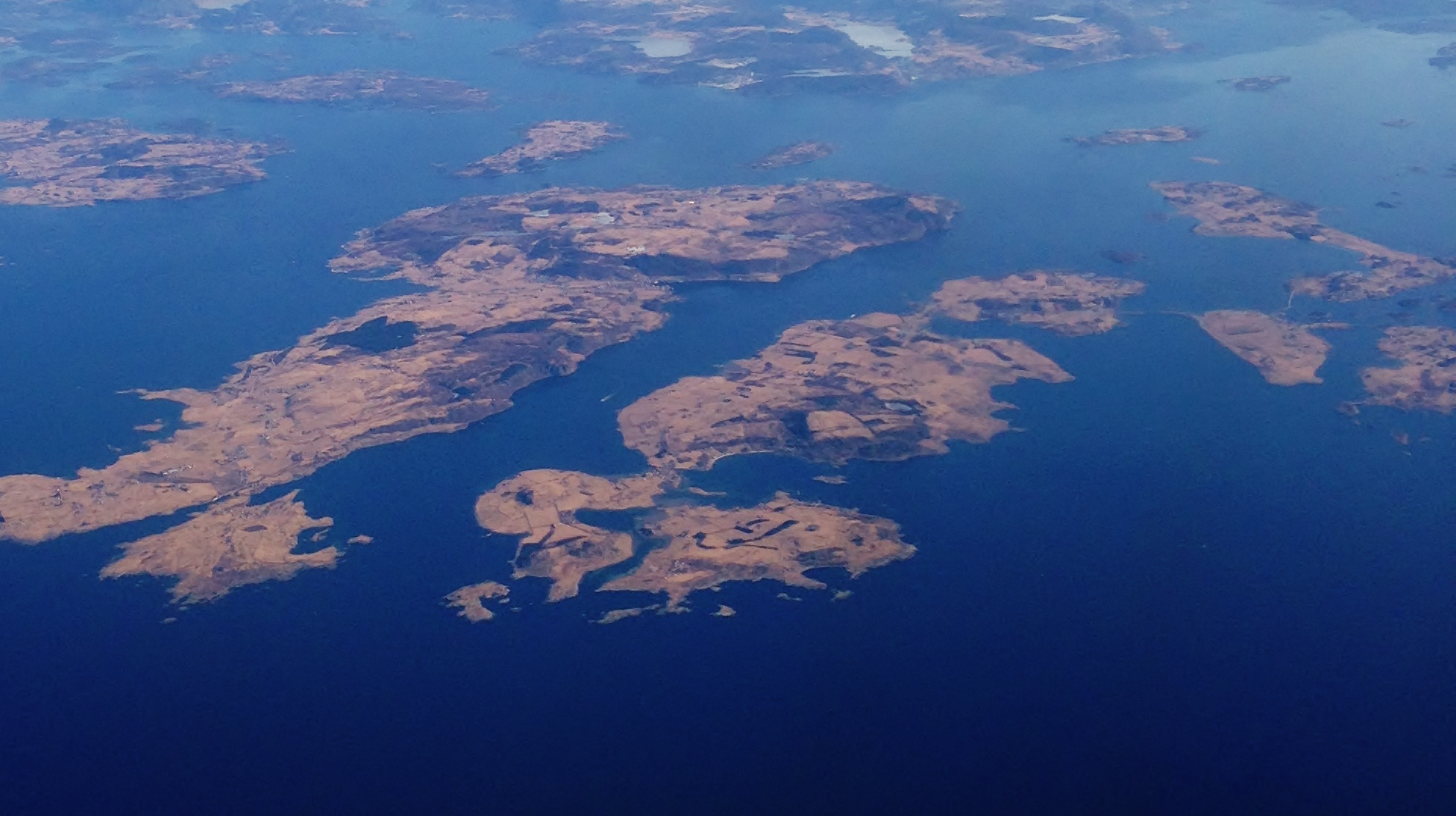
- View of Rennesøy (left, center) and Mosterøy (right, center)
- Interactive map of the island

Geography
- Location: Rogaland, Norway
- Coordinates: 59.08532°N 5.63668°E
- Area: 12 km^{2} (4.6 sq mi)
- Length: 6.7 km (4.16 mi)
- Width: 2.7 km (1.68 mi)
- Highest elevation: 154 m (505 ft)
- Highest point: Mastravarden

Administration
- Norway
- County: Rogaland
- Municipality: Stavanger Municipality

Demographics
- Population: 1109 (2022)

Mosterøy is an island in Stavanger Municipality in Rogaland county, Norway. The 12-square-kilometre (4.6 sq mi) island lies just southwest of the island of Rennesøy.The smaller islands of Sokn, Bru, and Åmøy lie to the south of Mosterøy and the islands of Klosterøy and Fjøløy lie to the west of Mosterøy. All of these islands are connected together and to the mainland city of Stavanger by a series of undersea tunnels and bridges. The Mastrafjord Tunnel connects Mosterøy to the island of Rennesøy and the Askjesund Bridge connects Mosterøy to the island of Sokn. Both the tunnel and bridge are part of the European route E39 highway.

Mosterøy is a well-cultivated island, with significant livestock and horticulture. The highest point is the 154-metre (505 ft) tall mountain Mastravarden, located on the west side of Mosterøy. There are residential areas all over the island, but especially in the east.

== History ==
The island of Mosterøy was part of the old Rennesøy Municipality for a long time, but in 1884 it became a part of the new Mosterøy Municipality which encompassed the island plus several surrounding islands. This independent municipality existed until 1965 when it was merged back into Rennesøy Municipality. Then in 2020, the island became a part of the newly-enlarged Stavanger Municipality.

== See also ==
- List of islands of Norway
