= Byfjord Tunnel =

Subsea road tunnel in Norway

Byfjord Tunnel Byfjordtunnelen
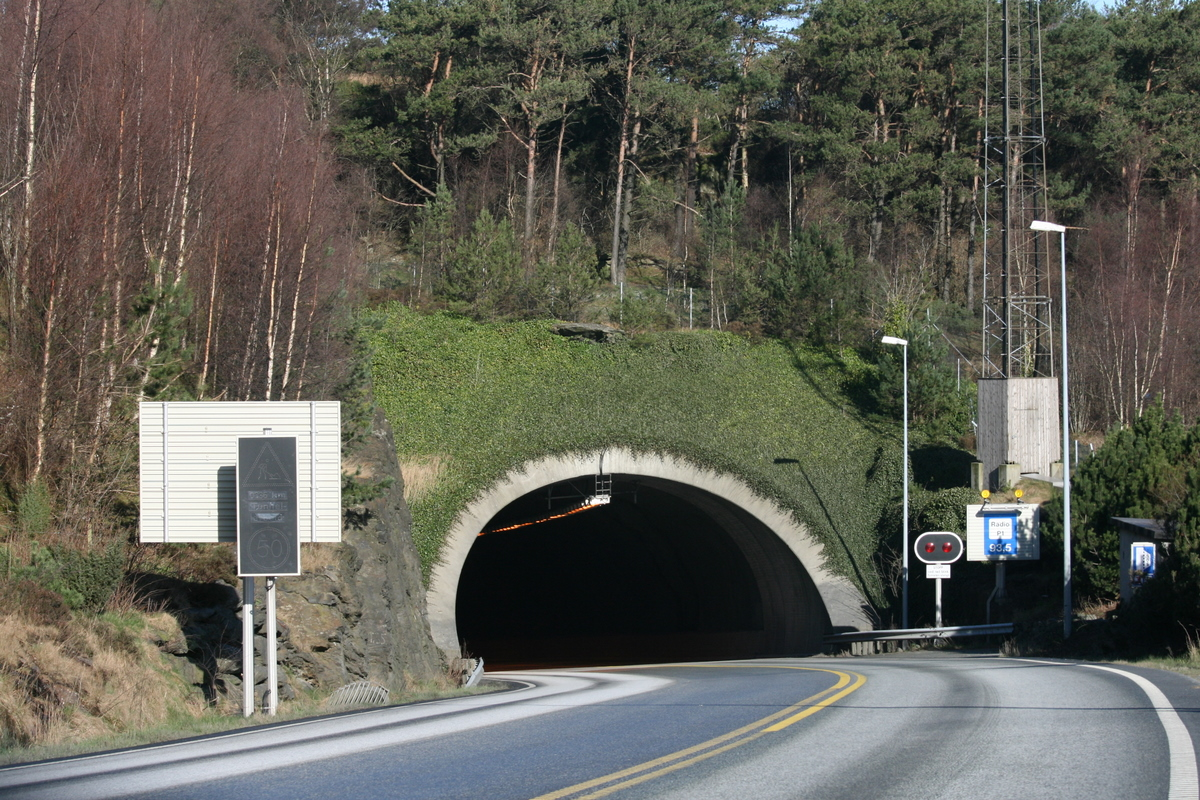
- View of the entrance to the tunnel
- Interactive map of Byfjord Tunnel; Byfjordtunnelen

Overview
- Location: Rogaland, Norway
- Coordinates: 59.0401°N 5.6332°E
- Status: In use
- Route: E39
- Start: Randaberg
- End: Sokn

Operation
- Opened: 1992
- Operator: Statens vegvesen
- Toll: Until 2006
- Vehicles per day: 9717 (2018)

Technical
- Length: 5,875 m (3.7 mi)
- No. of lanes: 2
- Min elevation: −223 m (−732 ft)
- Grade: 8%

The Byfjord Tunnel (Norwegian: Byfjordtunnelen) is a subsea road tunnel in Rogaland county, Norway. The 5,875-metre-long (19,275 ft) tunnel runs between the village of Grødem on the mainland in Randaberg Municipality and the island of Sokn in Stavanger Municipality, running underneath the Byfjorden. The tunnel was built as part of the Rennesøy Fixed Link project which opened in 1992 with the goal of connecting all the islands of Rennesøy Municipality to the mainland. The tunnel was a toll road from 1992 until 2006. The tunnel is part of European route E39 highway. With a maximum 8% grade, the tunnel reaches a depth of 223 metres (732 ft) below sea level at its lowest point. The tunnel was Europe's longest and the world's deepest sub-sea road tunnel upon its completion, it was surpassed by a deeper tunnel (Hitra Tunnel) in 1994 and a longer tunnel (Nordkapp Tunnel) in 1999. The tunnel had an average daily traffic of 9,717 vehicles in 2018.
