= Høyland Municipality =

Former municipality in Rogaland, Norway

Høyland Municipality Høyland herred
- Former municipality
- Høiland herred (historic name)
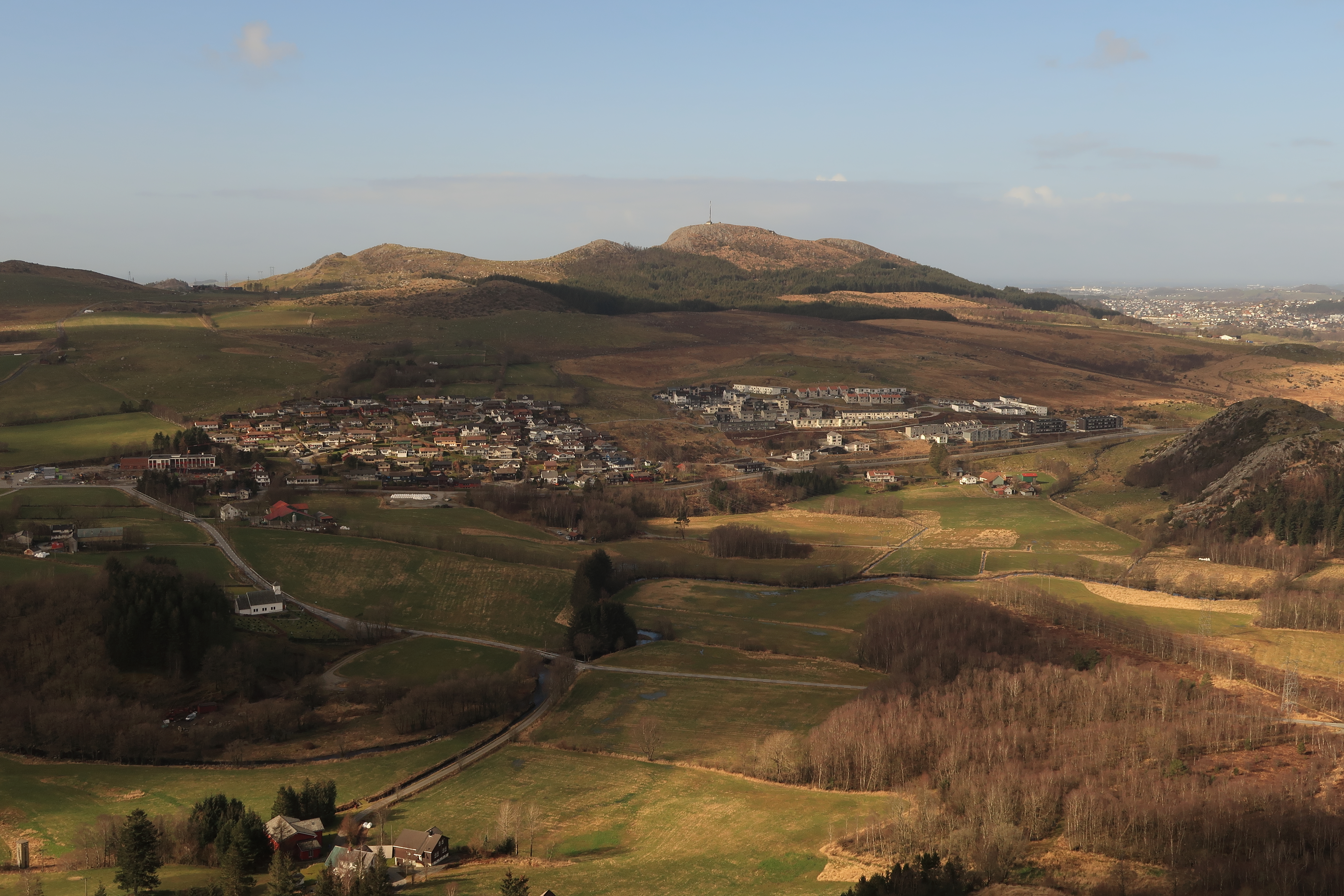
- View of the Sviland area

- Rogaland within Norway

- Høyland within Rogaland
- Coordinates: 58°49′51″N 05°45′02″E
- Country: Norway
- County: Rogaland
- District: Jæren
- Established: 1 Jan 1838
  - Created as: Formannskapsdistrikt
- Disestablished: 1 Jan 1965
  - Succeeded by: Sandnes Municipality
- Administrative centre: Høyland

Government
  - Mayor (1960–1964): Lars Vatsendvik ((V))

Area (upon dissolution)
  - Total: 163.9 km^{2} (63.3 sq mi)
  - Rank: #361 in Norway
- Highest elevation: 468 m (1,535 ft)

Population (1964)
  - Total: 20,124
  - Rank: #23 in Norway
  - Density: 122.8/km^{2} (318/sq mi)
  - Change (10 years): ▲ +34.5%

Official language
  - Norwegian form: Neutral
- Time zone: UTC+01:00 (CET)
  - Summer (DST): UTC+02:00 (CEST)
- ISO 3166 code: NO-1123

Høyland is a former municipality in Rogaland county, Norway. The 163.9-square-kilometre (63.3 sq mi) municipality existed from 1838 until its dissolution in 1965. The area is now part of Sandnes Municipality in the traditional district of Jæren. The administrative centre was the village of Høyland, located just south of the municipal border with the city of Sandnes.

Prior to its dissolution in 1965, the 163.9-square-kilometre (63.3 sq mi) municipality was the 361st largest by area out of the 525 municipalities in Norway. Høyland Municipality was the 23rd most populous municipality in Norway with a population of about 20,124. The municipality's population density was 122.8 inhabitants per square kilometre (318/sq mi) and its population had increased by 34.5% over the previous 10-year period.

== General information ==
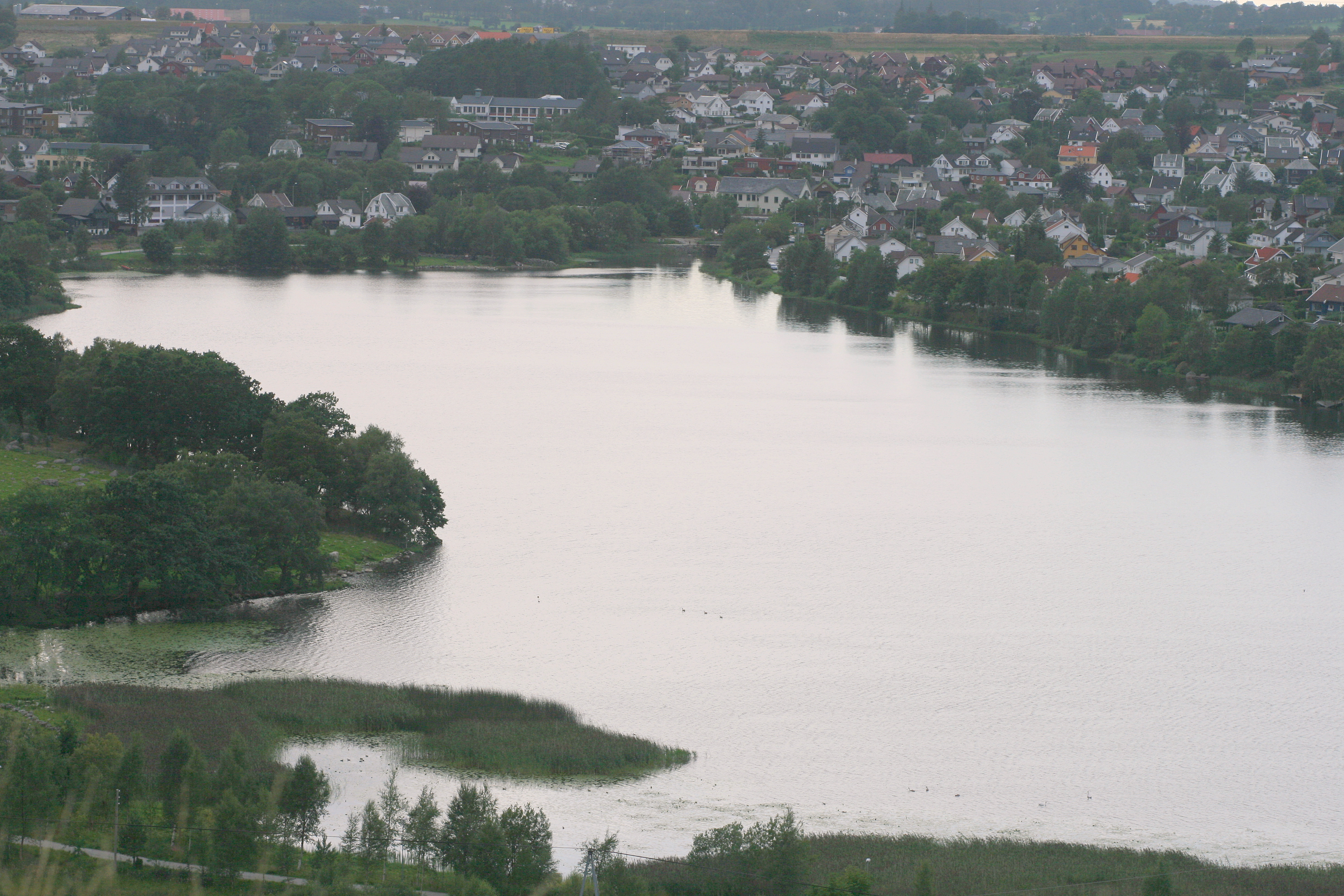
View of the lake Stokkalandsvatnet in Ganddal

The parish of Høiland (later spelled Høyland) was established as a municipality on 1 January 1838 (see formannskapsdistrikt law). According to the 1835 census the new municipality had a population of 2,286. On 6 April 1861, the large village of Sandnes (population: 440) was declared to be a ladested (seaport town). It was therefore separated from Høyland Municipality to constitute a new municipality of its own. The split left Høyland Municipality with 3,376 inhabitants. In 1912, a part of Høyland Municipality with 41 inhabitants was moved to the neighboring Hetland Municipality to the north. In 1957, a part of Høyland Municipality with 18 inhabitants was moved to the town of Sandnes.

During the 1960s, there were many municipal mergers across Norway due to the work of the Schei Committee. On 1 January 1965, Høyland Municipality was dissolved and the following areas were merged to form a larger Sandnes Municipality:

- all of Høyland Municipality (population: 20,353)
- all of the city of Sandnes (population: 3,961)
- the Riska and Dale areas of Hetland Municipality (population: 2,077)
- most of Høle Municipality (population: 926), except for the Oltevik area which became part of Gjesdal Municipality

=== Name ===
The municipality (originally the parish) is named after the old Høiland farm (Old Norse: Hœland) since the first Høyland Church was built there. The first element comes from the word hár which means "high" or "tall". The last element is land which means "land" or "district".

Historically, the name of the municipality was spelled Høiland. On 3 November 1917, a royal resolution changed the spelling of the name of the municipality to Høyland.

=== Churches ===
The Church of Norway had one parish (sokn) within Høyland Municipality. At the time of the municipal dissolution, it was part of the Høyland prestegjeld and the Jæren prosti (deanery) in the Diocese of Stavanger.

Churches in Høyland Municipality
Parish (sokn)	Church name	Location of the church	Year built
Høyland	Høyland Church	Austrått	1841
Høyland	Sviland Church	Sviland	1913

== Geography ==
The municipality was located at the innermost end of the Gandsfjorden. The highest point in the municipality was the 468-metre (1,535 ft) tall mountain Stølafjellet, located on the border of Gjesdal Municipality. Hetland Municipality was located to the north, Høle Municipality was located to the east, Gjesdal Municipality was located to the southeast, Time Municipality was located to the south, Klepp Municipality was located to the southwest, and Sola Municipality was located to the northwest. The city of Sandnes was located within Høyland Municipality as an enclave, completely surrounded by Høyland.

== Government ==
While it existed, Høyland Municipality was responsible for primary education (through 10th grade), outpatient health services, senior citizen services, welfare and other social services, zoning, economic development, and municipal roads and utilities. The municipality was governed by a municipal council of directly elected representatives. The mayor was indirectly elected by a vote of the municipal council. The municipality was under the jurisdiction of the Jæren District Court and the Gulating Court of Appeal.

=== Municipal council ===
The municipal council (Herredsstyre) of Høyland Municipality was made up of 41 representatives that were elected to four year terms. The tables below show the historical composition of the council by political party.

Høyland herredsstyre 1963–1965
Party name (in Norwegian)	Number of representatives
Labour Party (Arbeiderpartiet)	18
Conservative Party (Høyre)	6
Christian Democratic Party (Kristelig Folkeparti)	5
Centre Party (Senterpartiet)	4
Socialist People's Party (Sosialistisk Folkeparti)	1
Liberal Party (Venstre)	7
Total number of members:	41
Note: On 1 January 1965, Høyland Municipality became part of Sandnes Municipality.

Høyland herredsstyre 1959–1963
Party name (in Norwegian)	Number of representatives
Labour Party (Arbeiderpartiet)	16
Conservative Party (Høyre)	5
Communist Party (Kommunistiske Parti)	2
Christian Democratic Party (Kristelig Folkeparti)	5
Centre Party (Senterpartiet)	5
Liberal Party (Venstre)	8
Total number of members:	41

Høyland herredsstyre 1955–1959
Party name (in Norwegian)	Number of representatives
Labour Party (Arbeiderpartiet)	15
Conservative Party (Høyre)	3
Communist Party (Kommunistiske Parti)	2
Christian Democratic Party (Kristelig Folkeparti)	4
Farmers' Party (Bondepartiet)	5
Liberal Party (Venstre)	6
Total number of members:	35

Høyland herredsstyre 1951–1955
Party name (in Norwegian)	Number of representatives
Labour Party (Arbeiderpartiet)	10
Conservative Party (Høyre)	2
Communist Party (Kommunistiske Parti)	1
Christian Democratic Party (Kristelig Folkeparti)	3
Farmers' Party (Bondepartiet)	4
Liberal Party (Venstre)	4
Total number of members:	24

Høyland herredsstyre 1947–1951
Party name (in Norwegian)	Number of representatives
Labour Party (Arbeiderpartiet)	8
Conservative Party (Høyre)	1
Communist Party (Kommunistiske Parti)	2
Christian Democratic Party (Kristelig Folkeparti)	3
Farmers' Party (Bondepartiet)	5
Liberal Party (Venstre)	5
Total number of members:	24

Høyland herredsstyre 1945–1947
Party name (in Norwegian)	Number of representatives
Labour Party (Arbeiderpartiet)	11
Conservative Party (Høyre)	1
Communist Party (Kommunistiske Parti)	2
Christian Democratic Party (Kristelig Folkeparti)	2
Farmers' Party (Bondepartiet)	5
Liberal Party (Venstre)	3
Total number of members:	24

Høyland herredsstyre 1937–1941*
Party name (in Norwegian)	Number of representatives
Labour Party (Arbeiderpartiet)	9
Conservative Party (Høyre)	2
Farmers' Party (Bondepartiet)	6
Liberal Party (Venstre)	7
Total number of members:	24
Note: Due to the German occupation of Norway during World War II, no elections were held for new municipal councils until after the war ended in 1945.

=== Mayors ===
The mayor (Norwegian: ordfører) of Høyland Municipality was the political leader of the municipality and the chairperson of the municipal council. The following people have held this position:

- 1838–1841: Peder Olsen Tjessem
- 1842–1843: Even Evensen Jutland
- 1844–1847: Haavard Christophersen Lure
- 1848–1849: Jonas Schanche Jonasen
- 1850–1855: Ole Pedersen Tjessem
- 1856–1857: Torkel Aadnesen Haabet
- 1858–1863: Jan Adolf Budde
- 1864–1867: Svend Njeldsen Oftedahl
- 1868–1871: Jonas Schanche Jonasen
- 1872–1875: Jonas Evensen Lure
- 1876–1877: Svend Njeldsen Oftedahl
- 1878–1879: Svend Svendsen Haaland
- 1880–1884: Svend Njeldsen Oftedahl
- 1884–1885: Torkel Aadnesen Haabet
- 1886–1889: Thore Einarsen
- 1890–1891: Samuel Jonasen Sandved
- 1892–1901: Lars Adamsen Sporaland
- 1902–1907: Thore Einarsen
- 1908–1913: Lars Adamsen Sporaland
- 1914–1919: Søren Marius Martinsen Østraat
- 1920–1928: Jonas Schanche Thrane Sandved
- 1929–1934: Johan Martinsen Haga
- 1935–1939: Monrad Øksnevad
- 1939–1941: Edvard Astad
- 1941–1941: Monrad Øksnevad
- 1945–1945: Jonas Schanche Thrane Sandved
- 1946–1948: Louis E. Torgersen
- 1949–1951: Monrad Øksnevad
- 1952–1956: Louis E. Torgersen
- 1956–1957: Arthur O. Berge
- 1958–1959: Kristian Rønneberg
- 1960–1964: Lars Vatsendvik (V)

== See also ==
- List of former municipalities of Norway
