= Sandnes =

City and municipality in Rogaland County, Norway

Sandnes Municipality Sandnes kommune
- City & Municipality
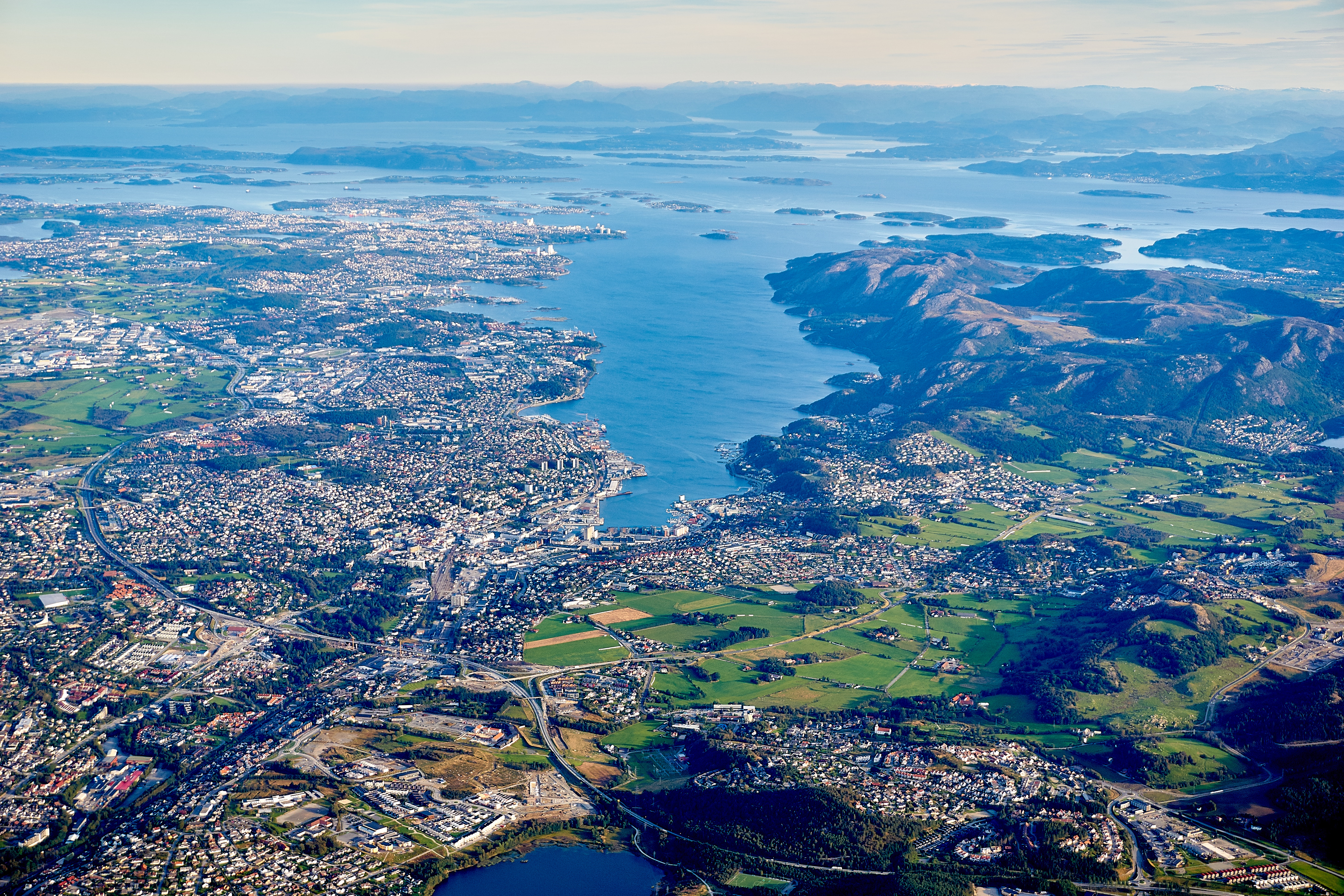
- View of the city from the south

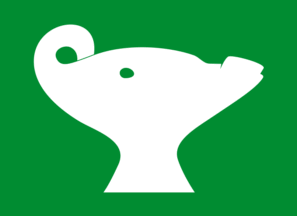
- Flag Coat of arms

- Location within Rogaland Location within Norway
- Coordinates: 58°51′06″N 05°44′10″E
- Country: Norway
- Municipality: Sandnes
- County: Rogaland
- District: Jæren
- City: 6 April 1861

Government
  - Mayor: Kenny Rettore (H)

Area
  - Municipality: 1,040.56 km^{2} (401.76 sq mi)
  - Land: 943.56 km^{2} (364.31 sq mi)
  - Rank: 109

Population (2023)
  - Municipality: 83,382
  - Density: 88.370/km^{2} (228.88/sq mi)
  - Urban: 237,369
  - Metro: 360,000
  - Municipality/ Urban rank: 7th/3rd
  - Metro rank: 3rd
- Demonym(s): Sandnesgauk; Sandnesbu; Sandneser

Language forms
  - Official form: Neutral
- Time zone: UTC+01:00 (CET)
  - Summer (DST): UTC+02:00 (CEST)
- Website: www.sandnes.kommune.no

Sandnes (pronounced [ˈsɑ̂nːeːs]) is a city and municipality in Rogaland, Norway. It lies immediately south of Stavanger (the 4th largest municipality in Norway), and together the Stavanger/Sandnes area is the third-largest urban area in Norway. The urban city of Sandnes lies in the extreme western part of the vast municipality and it makes up about 5% of the total land area of the municipality.

The western part of the municipality is very urbanized while the eastern part of the municipality is very rural. The municipality is divided into 13 boroughs and the administrative centre is located in the borough of Trones og Sentrum, a borough in the city. There are several villages in the rural parts of the municipality including Hommersåk, Høle, Foss-Eikeland, Stokka, Forsand, Lysebotn, and Vatne.

The 1,040.61-square-kilometre (401.78 sq mi) municipality is the 109th largest by area out of the 357 municipalities in Norway. Sandnes Municipality is the 11th most populous municipality in Norway with a population of 85,785 in 2026. The municipality's population density is 82.4 inhabitants per square kilometre (213/sq mi) and its population has increased by 12.8% over the previous 10-year period.

== History ==
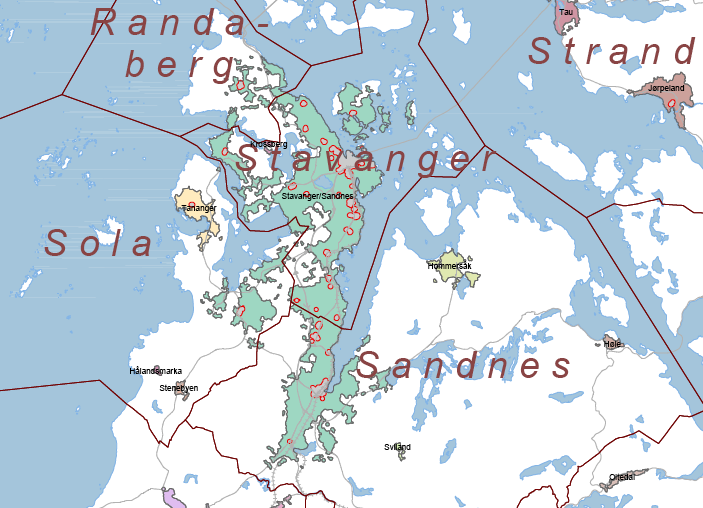
Map of the Stavanger/Sandnes region

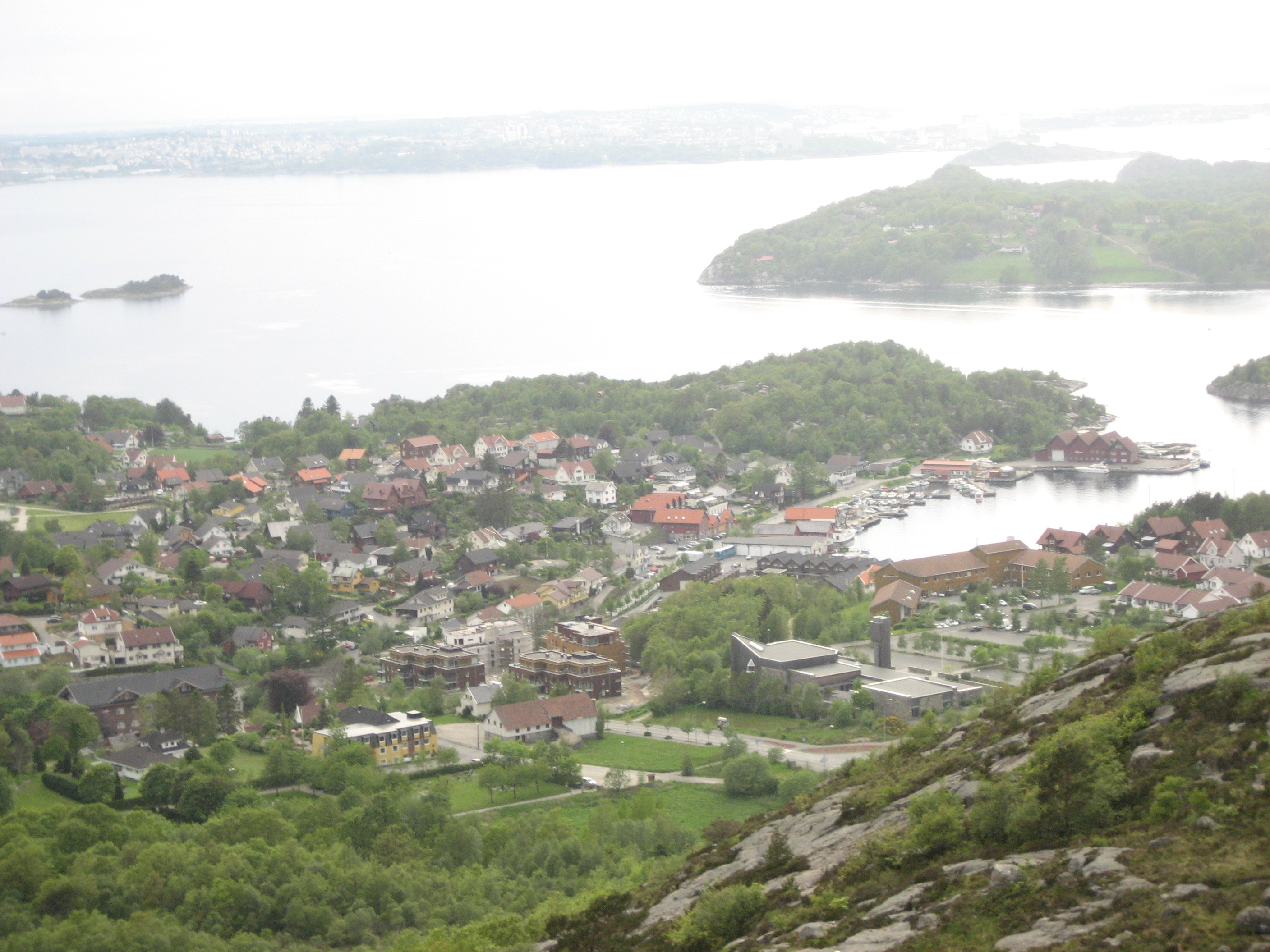
View of the village of Hommersåk

The small port village of Sandnes was granted ladested (lit. 'small seaport city') status in 1860. On 6 April 1861, the small city was separated from Høyland Municipality to form a separate self-governing municipality of its own. Initially, the municipality had 440 residents.

On 1 July 1957, a small part of Høyland Municipality (population: 18) was transferred into the city of Sandnes.

During the 1960s, there were many municipal mergers across Norway due to the work of the Schei Committee. On 1 January 1965, the following areas were merged to form a much larger Sandnes Municipality:

- the city and municipality of Sandnes (population: 3,961)
- all of Høyland Municipality (population: 20,353)
- most of Høle Municipality (population: 926), except for the Oltesvik area which became part of Gjesdal Municipality
- the Riska and Dale areas of Hetland Municipality (population: 2,077)

In 2014, the Storting decided that the number of municipalities in Norway would be lowered. If the municipalities of Sandnes, Stavanger and Sola were to merge, a new municipality would be formed called Nord-Jæren, after the name of the geographical location the municipalities are located in. After the city council said no to the merge, proposals for Forsand Municipality to merge with Sandnes were enacted instead.

On 1 January 2017, a small 350-decare (86-acre) area on the southwestern edge of the village of Solakrossen was transferred from Sandnes Municipality to the neighboring Sola Municipality.

On 1 January 2020, most of the neighboring Forsand Municipality was merged with Sandnes to form one large municipality called Sandnes.

=== Name ===
The municipality (and city) is named after an old Sandnæs farm, since the city was built on its grounds. The first element is sand which means 'sand' or 'sandy beach' and the last element is nes which means 'headland'. The farm was located at the end of the Gandsfjorden where the city centre is located today.

=== Coat of arms ===
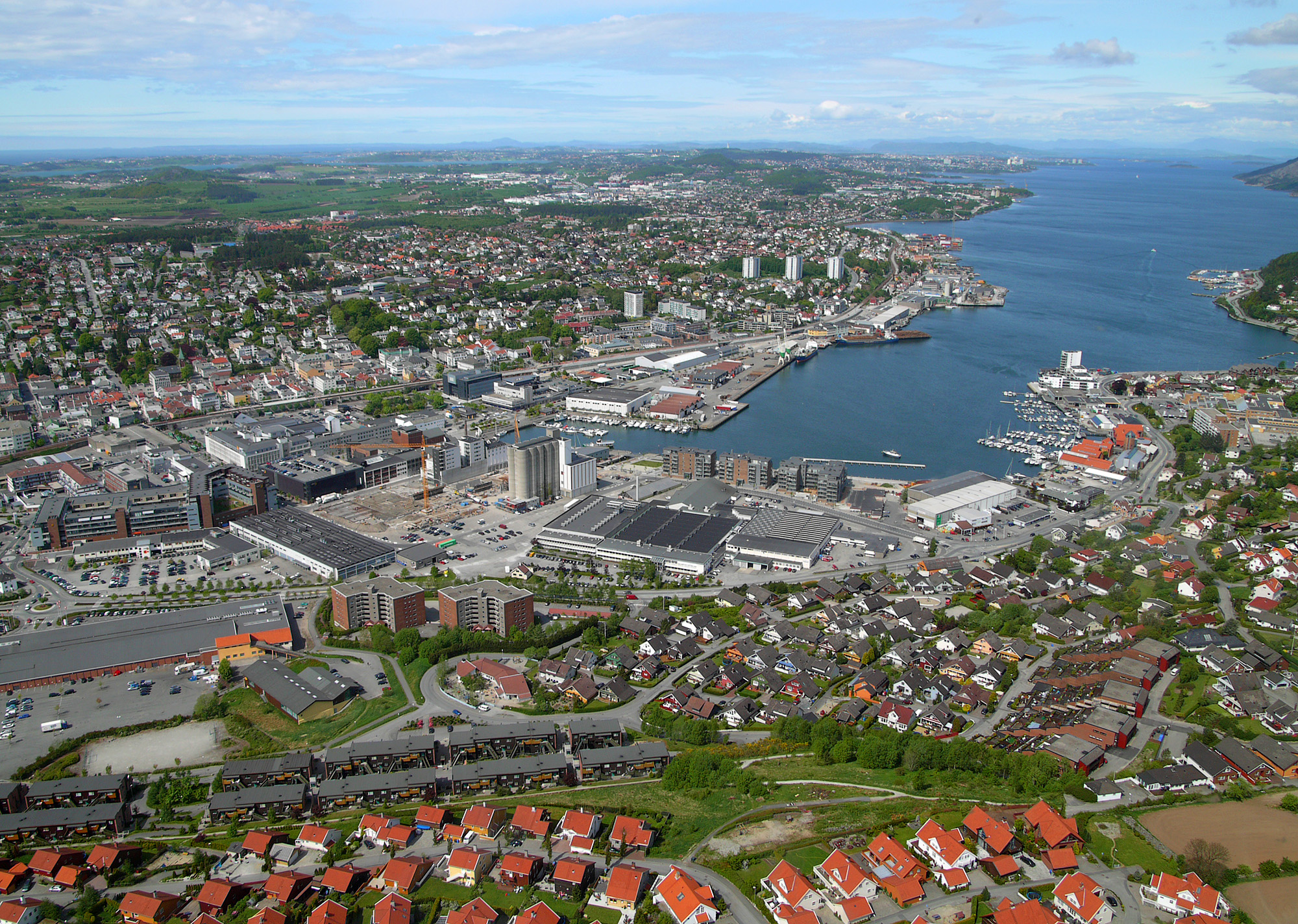
View of the city in 2008

The coat of arms, granted on 21 April 1972, shows a white piece of pottery against a green background. Pottery was chosen since it was one of the main industries in the late 18th century. The symbol is a leirgauk, which in English would be a ceramic cuckoo bird (leir(e), 'clay, ceramic' and gauk/gjøk, 'cuckoo bird'). The ceramic Sandnes cuckoo (Norwegian: sandnesgauk) is an ocarina or simple flute which was made by the potteries in Sandnes and used to advertise their products. Later it also became a nickname for people from Sandnes.

== Geography ==
The municipality lies in the Jæren traditional district and stretches 90 kilometres (56 mi) nearly from the west coast of Norway to the rugged mountainous interior. The city of Sandnes is located at the base of the Stavanger Peninsula, about 15 kilometres (9.3 mi) south of the city of Stavanger, and these two cities have expanded so as to form a conurbation. Sola is located to the west; Klepp, Time; and Gjesdal to the south; Sirdal and Bykle to the east, Strand and Hjelmeland to the northeast, and Stavanger to the northwest. The Gandsfjord is situated north–south at the west end of the municipality and the Høgsfjorden and Lysefjorden dominate the eastern part of the municipality. Stavanger Airport is located in Sola, just to the west of Sandnes.

The landscape of western Sandnes is quite flat. On the long west coast there are several beaches and further inland the land is raised to form low plains with some small peaks rising up to 400 to 500 metres (1,300 to 1,600 ft) above sea level. From Stavanger and Sandnes it is approximately one hour by car to alpine and skiing resorts. In Sandnes there are some easily accessible small mountain peaks, such as Dalsnuten and Lifjell, with a view over the Sandnes/Stavanger area. The renowned Lysefjorden is also easily accessible by car or boat. The lake Frøylandsvatnet, the river Figgjoelva, and the mountain Hanafjellet are all located in Sandnes.

The Lysefjorden in the eastern part of the municipality is surrounded by very steep 1,000-metre (3,300 ft) tall cliffs such as Kjerag and Preikestolen, with the Lysefjord Bridge crossing the fjord near the western end. The famous Kjeragbolten boulder and Kjeragfossen waterfall are located along the inner part of the fjord. The village of Lysebotn lies at the eastern end of the fjord. The lake Nilsebuvatnet is located high up in the mountains, north of Lysebotn on the border of Strand. It is regulated for hydroelectric power use at the Lysebotn Hydroelectric Power Station.

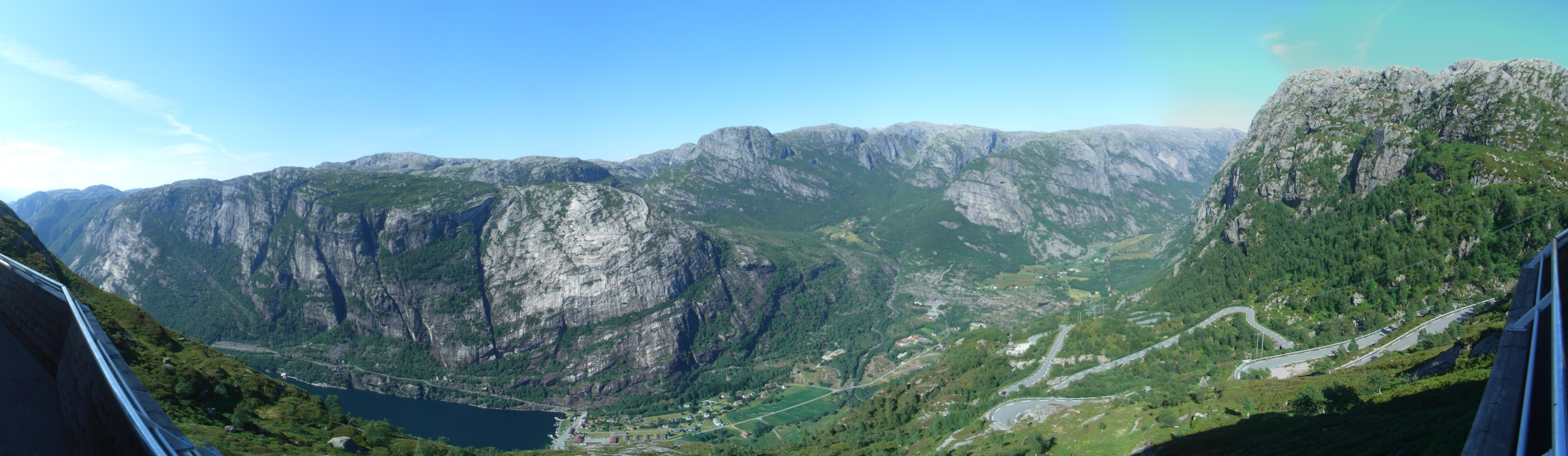
Panoramic view over the village Lysebotn located innermost in the Lysefjord (full image)

=== Climate ===
Sandnes is in a common urban area with Stavanger and thus the weather station for the international airport of Stavanger Sola is the closest weather station to Sandnes proper.

Situated on the southwest coast of Norway, the local climate is greatly influenced by the temperate water in the North Sea, and Atlantic lows giving mild westerlies also in winter. This creates warmer temperatures throughout the year compared to other cities at similar latitudes, and also gives plentiful precipitation in the form of rain, especially in late autumn and winter. Sandnes is a little bit more inland than the airport so thus may have slightly warmer summer days and cooler winter nights as a result.

Sandnes has a temperate oceanic climate (Köppen: Cfb, Trewartha: Dolk) with five months with a mean temperature above 10 °C (50 °F). Spring and early summer is the driest season. The all-time high 33.5 °C (92.3 °F) at the airport was recorded August 1975. The warmest high recorded in the Stavanger area is 34.4 °C (93.9 °F) at the weather station Stavanger-Våland (72 m) in July 2018. The all-time low −19.8 °C (−3.6 °F) was recorded January 1987.

Climate data for Stavanger Airport Sola 1991-2020 (7 m, extremes: 1947–2020, sunhours 1961-1990)
| Month | Jan | Feb | Mar | Apr | May | Jun | Jul | Aug | Sep | Oct | Nov | Dec | Year |
|---|---|---|---|---|---|---|---|---|---|---|---|---|---|
| Record high °C (°F) | 12.4 (54.3) | 13.9 (57.0) | 17.7 (63.9) | 25.2 (77.4) | 29.4 (84.9) | 30.5 (86.9) | 32.5 (90.5) | 33.5 (92.3) | 26.7 (80.1) | 22.3 (72.1) | 16.2 (61.2) | 12 (54) | 33.5 (92.3) |
| Mean daily maximum °C (°F) | 4.0 (39.2) | 4.0 (39.2) | 7.0 (44.6) | 11.0 (51.8) | 15.0 (59.0) | 18.0 (64.4) | 20.0 (68.0) | 20.0 (68.0) | 16.0 (60.8) | 12.0 (53.6) | 8.0 (46.4) | 5.0 (41.0) | 11.7 (53.0) |
| Daily mean °C (°F) | 2.2 (36.0) | 2.2 (36.0) | 4.5 (40.1) | 7.5 (45.5) | 11.5 (52.7) | 14.0 (57.2) | 16.0 (60.8) | 16.5 (61.7) | 13.0 (55.4) | 9.5 (49.1) | 6.0 (42.8) | 3.0 (37.4) | 8.9 (48.0) |
| Mean daily minimum °C (°F) | 0.5 (32.9) | 0.5 (32.9) | 2.0 (35.6) | 4.0 (39.2) | 8.0 (46.4) | 10.0 (50.0) | 12.0 (53.6) | 13.0 (55.4) | 10.0 (50.0) | 7.0 (44.6) | 4.0 (39.2) | 1.0 (33.8) | 6.0 (42.8) |
| Record low °C (°F) | −19.8 (−3.6) | −19.2 (−2.6) | −16.2 (2.8) | −7.9 (17.8) | −2.5 (27.5) | 0.6 (33.1) | 4.3 (39.7) | 1.2 (34.2) | −2.5 (27.5) | −5.2 (22.6) | −16.1 (3.0) | −16.1 (3.0) | −19.8 (−3.6) |
| Average precipitation mm (inches) | 118.5 (4.67) | 99.6 (3.92) | 80.5 (3.17) | 62.5 (2.46) | 62.1 (2.44) | 67.3 (2.65) | 91.2 (3.59) | 126.5 (4.98) | 132 (5.2) | 148.3 (5.84) | 135.2 (5.32) | 132.4 (5.21) | 1,256.1 (49.45) |
| Average precipitation days (≥ 1.0 mm) | 13.7 | 10.4 | 11.9 | 9.9 | 10.7 | 10.6 | 10.8 | 14.0 | 16.9 | 16.7 | 17.7 | 15.6 | 158.9 |
| Average relative humidity (%) | 82 | 81 | 78 | 77 | 75 | 78 | 78 | 80 | 80 | 81 | 82 | 82 | 80 |
| Mean monthly sunshine hours | 48 | 79 | 140 | 168 | 226 | 222 | 197 | 159 | 141 | 80 | 45 | 33 | 1,538 |
Source 1: yr.no/met.no NOAA (humidity only)
Source 2: Meteostat (avg highs/lows)

Climate data for Stavanger Airport (2002–2020 averages & extremes)
| Month | Jan | Feb | Mar | Apr | May | Jun | Jul | Aug | Sep | Oct | Nov | Dec | Year |
|---|---|---|---|---|---|---|---|---|---|---|---|---|---|
| Record high °C (°F) | 11.2 (52.2) | 13.9 (57.0) | 17.7 (63.9) | 22.4 (72.3) | 29.4 (84.9) | 29.1 (84.4) | 32.5 (90.5) | 29.4 (84.9) | 26.7 (80.1) | 22.3 (72.1) | 16.2 (61.2) | 12.0 (53.6) | 32.5 (90.5) |
| Mean maximum °C (°F) | 9.0 (48.2) | 8.9 (48.0) | 12.1 (53.8) | 17.4 (63.3) | 22.9 (73.2) | 24.8 (76.6) | 26.7 (80.1) | 25.7 (78.3) | 21.6 (70.9) | 16.9 (62.4) | 12.8 (55.0) | 9.9 (49.8) | 28.2 (82.8) |
| Mean daily maximum °C (°F) | 4.7 (40.5) | 4.8 (40.6) | 6.8 (44.2) | 10.9 (51.6) | 13.9 (57.0) | 16.8 (62.2) | 20.0 (68.0) | 20.0 (68.0) | 16.4 (61.5) | 12.2 (54.0) | 8.4 (47.1) | 6.0 (42.8) | 11.7 (53.1) |
| Daily mean °C (°F) | 2.3 (36.1) | 2.4 (36.3) | 3.9 (39.0) | 7.5 (45.5) | 10.5 (50.9) | 13.6 (56.5) | 16.4 (61.5) | 16.5 (61.7) | 13.5 (56.3) | 9.3 (48.7) | 5.8 (42.4) | 3.6 (38.5) | 8.8 (47.8) |
| Mean daily minimum °C (°F) | 0.5 (32.9) | 0.5 (32.9) | 1.0 (33.8) | 4.0 (39.2) | 7.1 (44.8) | 10.3 (50.5) | 12.8 (55.0) | 13.0 (55.4) | 10.6 (51.1) | 6.4 (43.5) | 3.2 (37.8) | 1.1 (34.0) | 5.9 (42.6) |
| Mean minimum °C (°F) | −8.9 (16.0) | −7.5 (18.5) | −5.5 (22.1) | −1.4 (29.5) | 1.8 (35.2) | 6.0 (42.8) | 8.8 (47.8) | 8.1 (46.6) | 5.2 (41.4) | −0.6 (30.9) | −4.9 (23.2) | −6.8 (19.8) | −10.9 (12.4) |
| Record low °C (°F) | −19.1 (−2.4) | −12.8 (9.0) | −13.3 (8.1) | −5.2 (22.6) | −1.5 (29.3) | 3.9 (39.0) | 6.6 (43.9) | 6.0 (42.8) | 1.8 (35.2) | −4.3 (24.3) | −11.7 (10.9) | −15.5 (4.1) | −19.1 (−2.4) |
| Average precipitation mm (inches) | 122.5 (4.82) | 89.6 (3.53) | 72.9 (2.87) | 60.7 (2.39) | 69.0 (2.72) | 66.9 (2.63) | 104.0 (4.09) | 131.3 (5.17) | 146.0 (5.75) | 142.5 (5.61) | 141.6 (5.57) | 134.6 (5.30) | 1,281.6 (50.45) |
Source: Norsk Klimaservicesenter

=== Location ===
Sandnes is located on the west coast of Norway. Here are some distances from the city of Sandnes to other major cities in Norway:

- Stavanger 12 kilometres (7.5 mi)
- Vigrestad 40 kilometres (25 mi)
- Kristiansand 155 kilometres (96 mi)
- Bergen 170 kilometres (110 mi)
- Arendal 281 kilometres (175 mi)
- Oslo 305 kilometres (190 mi)
- Ålesund 400 kilometres (250 mi)
- Trondheim 570 kilometres (350 mi)
- Tromsø 1,360 kilometres (850 mi)

== Government ==
Sandnes Municipality is responsible for primary education, outpatient health services, senior citizen services, welfare and other social services, zoning, economic development, and municipal roads and utilities. The municipality is governed by a municipal council of directly elected representatives. The mayor is elected by a vote of the municipal council. The municipality is under the jurisdiction of the Sør-Rogaland District Court and the Gulating Court of Appeal.

Sandnes is divided into 14 buroughs: Austrått, Figgjo, Ganddal, Hana, Høle, Lura, Malmheim og Soma, Riska, Sandved, Stangeland, Sviland, Trones og Sentrum, and Forsand. For administrative purposes, these are grouped into 6 områdeutvalg: Øst, Nord, Sørøst, Sør, Sentrum, and Vest.

=== Municipal council ===
The municipal council (Kommunestyre) of Sandnes is made up of 49 representatives that are elected to four-year terms. Elections are always held two years from the parliamentary elections. The tables below show the current and historical composition of the council by political party.

Sandnes kommunestyre 2023–2027
| Party name (in Norwegian) | Number of representatives |
|---|---|
| Labour Party (Arbeiderpartiet) | 8 |
| Progress Party (Fremskrittspartiet) | 12 |
| Green Party (Miljøpartiet De Grønne) | 1 |
| Conservative Party (Høyre) | 13 |
| Industry and Business Party (Industri‑ og Næringspartiet) | 2 |
| Christian Democratic Party (Kristelig Folkeparti) | 4 |
| Pensioners' Party (Pensjonistpartiet) | 1 |
| Red Party (Rødt) | 1 |
| Centre Party (Senterpartiet) | 2 |
| Socialist Left Party (Sosialistisk Venstreparti) | 3 |
| Liberal Party (Venstre) | 2 |
| Total number of members: | 49 |

Sandnes kommunestyre 2019–2023
| Party name (in Norwegian) | Number of representatives |
|---|---|
| Labour Party (Arbeiderpartiet) | 13 |
| People's Action No to More Road Tolls (Folkeaksjonen nei til mer bompenger) | 5 |
| Progress Party (Fremskrittspartiet) | 9 |
| Green Party (Miljøpartiet De Grønne) | 3 |
| Conservative Party (Høyre) | 8 |
| Christian Democratic Party (Kristelig Folkeparti) | 4 |
| Red Party (Rødt) | 1 |
| Centre Party (Senterpartiet) | 3 |
| Socialist Left Party (Sosialistisk Venstreparti) | 2 |
| Liberal Party (Venstre) | 1 |
| Total number of members: | 49 |

Sandnes kommunestyre 2015–2019
| Party name (in Norwegian) | Number of representatives |
|---|---|
| Labour Party (Arbeiderpartiet) | 18 |
| Progress Party (Fremskrittspartiet) | 12 |
| Green Party (Miljøpartiet De Grønne) | 1 |
| Conservative Party (Høyre) | 8 |
| Christian Democratic Party (Kristelig Folkeparti) | 5 |
| Centre Party (Senterpartiet) | 2 |
| Socialist Left Party (Sosialistisk Venstreparti) | 1 |
| Liberal Party (Venstre) | 2 |
| Total number of members: | 49 |

Sandnes kommunestyre 2011–2015
| Party name (in Norwegian) | Number of representatives |
|---|---|
| Labour Party (Arbeiderpartiet) | 11 |
| Progress Party (Fremskrittspartiet) | 11 |
| Conservative Party (Høyre) | 15 |
| Christian Democratic Party (Kristelig Folkeparti) | 4 |
| Pensioners' Party (Pensjonistpartiet) | 1 |
| Centre Party (Senterpartiet) | 3 |
| Socialist Left Party (Sosialistisk Venstreparti) | 2 |
| Liberal Party (Venstre) | 2 |
| Total number of members: | 49 |

Sandnes kommunestyre 2007–2011
| Party name (in Norwegian) | Number of representatives |
|---|---|
| Labour Party (Arbeiderpartiet) | 11 |
| Progress Party (Fremskrittspartiet) | 13 |
| Conservative Party (Høyre) | 11 |
| Christian Democratic Party (Kristelig Folkeparti) | 6 |
| Pensioners' Party (Pensjonistpartiet) | 1 |
| Centre Party (Senterpartiet) | 2 |
| Socialist Left Party (Sosialistisk Venstreparti) | 2 |
| Liberal Party (Venstre) | 3 |
| Total number of members: | 49 |

Sandnes kommunestyre 2003–2007
| Party name (in Norwegian) | Number of representatives |
|---|---|
| Labour Party (Arbeiderpartiet) | 8 |
| Progress Party (Fremskrittspartiet) | 12 |
| Conservative Party (Høyre) | 11 |
| Christian Democratic Party (Kristelig Folkeparti) | 6 |
| Pensioners' Party (Pensjonistpartiet) | 2 |
| Centre Party (Senterpartiet) | 3 |
| Socialist Left Party (Sosialistisk Venstreparti) | 5 |
| Liberal Party (Venstre) | 2 |
| Total number of members: | 49 |

Sandnes kommunestyre 1999–2003
| Party name (in Norwegian) | Number of representatives |
|---|---|
| Labour Party (Arbeiderpartiet) | 14 |
| Progress Party (Fremskrittspartiet) | 13 |
| Conservative Party (Høyre) | 19 |
| Christian Democratic Party (Kristelig Folkeparti) | 11 |
| Pensioners' Party (Pensjonistpartiet) | 2 |
| Red Electoral Alliance (Rød Valgallianse) | 1 |
| Centre Party (Senterpartiet) | 3 |
| Socialist Left Party (Sosialistisk Venstreparti) | 3 |
| Liberal Party (Venstre) | 3 |
| Total number of members: | 69 |

Sandnes kommunestyre 1995–1999
| Party name (in Norwegian) | Number of representatives |
|---|---|
| Labour Party (Arbeiderpartiet) | 16 |
| Progress Party (Fremskrittspartiet) | 11 |
| Conservative Party (Høyre) | 17 |
| Christian Democratic Party (Kristelig Folkeparti) | 9 |
| Pensioners' Party (Pensjonistpartiet) | 3 |
| Centre Party (Senterpartiet) | 6 |
| Socialist Left Party (Sosialistisk Venstreparti) | 3 |
| Liberal Party (Venstre) | 4 |
| Total number of members: | 69 |

Sandnes kommunestyre 1991–1995
| Party name (in Norwegian) | Number of representatives |
|---|---|
| Labour Party (Arbeiderpartiet) | 16 |
| Progress Party (Fremskrittspartiet) | 6 |
| Conservative Party (Høyre) | 16 |
| Christian Democratic Party (Kristelig Folkeparti) | 9 |
| Pensioners' Party (Pensjonistpartiet) | 4 |
| Centre Party (Senterpartiet) | 8 |
| Socialist Left Party (Sosialistisk Venstreparti) | 6 |
| Liberal Party (Venstre) | 4 |
| Total number of members: | 69 |

Sandnes kommunestyre 1987–1991
| Party name (in Norwegian) | Number of representatives |
|---|---|
| Labour Party (Arbeiderpartiet) | 19 |
| Progress Party (Fremskrittspartiet) | 11 |
| Conservative Party (Høyre) | 18 |
| Christian Democratic Party (Kristelig Folkeparti) | 9 |
| Centre Party (Senterpartiet) | 4 |
| Socialist Left Party (Sosialistisk Venstreparti) | 3 |
| Liberal Party (Venstre) | 5 |
| Total number of members: | 69 |

Sandnes kommunestyre 1983–1987
| Party name (in Norwegian) | Number of representatives |
|---|---|
| Labour Party (Arbeiderpartiet) | 21 |
| Progress Party (Fremskrittspartiet) | 7 |
| Conservative Party (Høyre) | 19 |
| Christian Democratic Party (Kristelig Folkeparti) | 10 |
| Centre Party (Senterpartiet) | 4 |
| Socialist Left Party (Sosialistisk Venstreparti) | 3 |
| Liberal Party (Venstre) | 5 |
| Total number of members: | 69 |

Sandnes kommunestyre 1979–1983
| Party name (in Norwegian) | Number of representatives |
|---|---|
| Labour Party (Arbeiderpartiet) | 20 |
| Progress Party (Fremskrittspartiet) | 2 |
| Conservative Party (Høyre) | 22 |
| Christian Democratic Party (Kristelig Folkeparti) | 12 |
| New People's Party (Nye Folkepartiet) | 2 |
| Centre Party (Senterpartiet) | 4 |
| Socialist Left Party (Sosialistisk Venstreparti) | 2 |
| Liberal Party (Venstre) | 5 |
| Total number of members: | 69 |

Sandnes kommunestyre 1975–1979
| Party name (in Norwegian) | Number of representatives |
|---|---|
| Labour Party (Arbeiderpartiet) | 24 |
| Conservative Party (Høyre) | 15 |
| Christian Democratic Party (Kristelig Folkeparti) | 15 |
| New People's Party (Nye Folkepartiet) | 4 |
| Centre Party (Senterpartiet) | 7 |
| Socialist Left Party (Sosialistisk Venstreparti) | 2 |
| Liberal Party (Venstre) | 2 |
| Total number of members: | 69 |

Sandnes kommunestyre 1971–1975
| Party name (in Norwegian) | Number of representatives |
|---|---|
| Labour Party (Arbeiderpartiet) | 26 |
| Conservative Party (Høyre) | 11 |
| Christian Democratic Party (Kristelig Folkeparti) | 12 |
| Centre Party (Senterpartiet) | 8 |
| Socialist People's Party (Sosialistisk Folkeparti) | 3 |
| Liberal Party (Venstre) | 9 |
| Total number of members: | 69 |

Sandnes kommunestyre 1967–1971
| Party name (in Norwegian) | Number of representatives |
|---|---|
| Labour Party (Arbeiderpartiet) | 28 |
| Conservative Party (Høyre) | 11 |
| Christian Democratic Party (Kristelig Folkeparti) | 9 |
| Centre Party (Senterpartiet) | 7 |
| Socialist People's Party (Sosialistisk Folkeparti) | 3 |
| Liberal Party (Venstre) | 11 |
| Total number of members: | 69 |

Sandnes bystyre 1963–1967
| Party name (in Norwegian) | Number of representatives |
|---|---|
| Labour Party (Arbeiderpartiet) | 13 |
| Conservative Party (Høyre) | 7 |
| Liberal Party (Venstre) | 9 |
| Total number of members: | 29 |

Sandnes bystyre 1959–1963
| Party name (in Norwegian) | Number of representatives |
|---|---|
| Labour Party (Arbeiderpartiet) | 13 |
| Conservative Party (Høyre) | 7 |
| Liberal Party (Venstre) | 9 |
| Total number of members: | 29 |

Sandnes bystyre 1955–1959
| Party name (in Norwegian) | Number of representatives |
|---|---|
| Labour Party (Arbeiderpartiet) | 14 |
| Conservative Party (Høyre) | 5 |
| Communist Party (Kommunistiske Parti) | 1 |
| Liberal Party (Venstre) | 9 |
| Total number of members: | 29 |

Sandnes bystyre 1951–1955
| Party name (in Norwegian) | Number of representatives |
|---|---|
| Labour Party (Arbeiderpartiet) | 14 |
| Conservative Party (Høyre) | 5 |
| Liberal Party (Venstre) | 9 |
| Total number of members: | 28 |

Sandnes bystyre 1947–1951
| Party name (in Norwegian) | Number of representatives |
|---|---|
| Labour Party (Arbeiderpartiet) | 12 |
| Conservative Party (Høyre) | 5 |
| Communist Party (Kommunistiske Parti) | 2 |
| Liberal Party (Venstre) | 9 |
| Total number of members: | 28 |

Sandnes bystyre 1945–1947
| Party name (in Norwegian) | Number of representatives |
|---|---|
| Labour Party (Arbeiderpartiet) | 14 |
| Conservative Party (Høyre) | 3 |
| Communist Party (Kommunistiske Parti) | 2 |
| Liberal Party (Venstre) | 9 |
| Total number of members: | 28 |

Sandnes bystyre 1937–1941*
| Party name (in Norwegian) | Number of representatives |
|---|---|
| Labour Party (Arbeiderpartiet) | 13 |
| Conservative Party (Høyre) | 3 |
| Liberal Party (Venstre) | 12 |
| Total number of members: | 28 |
Note: Due to the German occupation of Norway during World War II, no elections were held for new municipal councils until after the war ended in 1945.

Sandnes bystyre 1934–1937
| Party name (in Norwegian) | Number of representatives |
|---|---|
| Labour Party (Arbeiderpartiet) | 8 |
| Conservative Party (Høyre) | 3 |
| Liberal Party (Venstre) | 9 |
| Total number of members: | 20 |

=== Mayors ===
The mayor (Norwegian: ordfører) of Sandnes Municipality is the political leader of the municipality and the chairperson of the municipal council. The following people have held this position:

- 1861-1864: Jan Adolph Budde
- 1864-1864: Anders Tvedt
- 1864-1864: Gabriel Sandved
- 1865-1866: Abraham Hobberstad
- 1866-1867: Sven Njeldson Oftedahl
- 1867-1868: Mauritz Kartevold
- 1869-1870: Gabriel Sandved
- 1871-1873: Mauritz Kartevold
- 1873-1875: Jonas Eivindson Lura
- 1875-1876: K.M. Sørensen
- 1876-1877: Sven Njeldson Oftedahl
- 1877-1877: Martin Nygaard
- 1878-1878: Svend O. Mouland
- 1878-1879: Sven Svendson Haaland
- 1879-1880: K.M. Sørensen
- 1880-1882: Sven Njeldson Oftedahl
- 1882-1882: Svend O. Mouland
- 1883-1884: Ole Svendsen
- 1885-1885: Andreas O. Anfindsen
- 1886-1888: Ole Svendsen
- 1889-1890: Petter Simon Øgland
- 1890-1891: Samuel Jonasson Sandved
- 1891-1895: Petter Simon Øgland
- 1895-1896: Lars Adamson Sporaland
- 1896-1897: Olaf Anfindsen (V)
- 1898-1898: O.C. Østraadt (H)
- 1899-1901: Olaf Anfindsen (V)
- 1902-1902: O.C. Østraadt (H)
- 1903-1903: Olaf Anfindsen (V)
- 1904-1904: O.C. Østraadt (H)
- 1905-1905: Olaf Anfindsen (V)
- 1906-1907: O.C. Østraadt (H)
- 1908-1912: L.O. Nygaard (AvH)
- 1913-1913: Thorvald S. Øglænd (AvH)
- 1914-1915: L.O. Nygaard (AvH)
- 1916-1916: Thorvald S. Øglænd (AvH)
- 1917-1919: Enok Berge (AvH)
- 1920-1921: Thorvald S. Øglænd (AvH)
- 1922-1929: Lars Øglænd (V)
- 1929-1934: Johan Martinson Haga (Bp)
- 1935-1936: Monrad Øksnevad (Bp)
- 1936-1938: Gunvald Rasmussen (V)
- 1938-1941: Edvard Astad (Ap)
- 1941-1941: Monrad Øksnevad (Bp)
- 1945-1945: Gunvald Rasmussen (V)
- 1946-1947: Louis Torgersen (Ap)
- 1947-1948: Tollef Fjermestad (Ap)
- 1948-1949: Andreas J. Båstøl (Ap)
- 1950-1950: Jakob Skretting (Ap)
- 1950-1951: Gunvald Rasmussen (V)
- 1952-1953: Andreas J. Båstøl (Ap)
- 1953-1955: Louis Torgersen (Ap)
- 1955-1956: Gunvald Rasmussen (V)
- 1956-1957: Arthur O. Berge (KrF)
- 1958-1959: Kristian Rønneberg (Sp)
- 1960-1961: Audun Schance Olsen (V)
- 1962-1963: Torleiv Tengs-Pedersen (H)
- 1964-1964: Audun Schance Olsen (V)
- 1965-1967: Lars Vatsendvik (V)
- 1968-1969: Lauritz B. Sirevåg (H)
- 1970-1971: Arne Tunheim (V)
- 1972-1973: Beint Bentsen (KrF)
- 1974-1977: Arne Sandnes (H)
- 1978-1979: Odd Arnøy (KrF)
- 1980-1981: Arne Sandnes (H)
- 1982-1985: Sigurd Aarsland (KrF)
- 1986-1990: Roald G. Bergsaker (H)
- 1991-1993: Geir Mykletun (KrF)
- 1994-2007: Jostein W. Rovik (H)
- 2007-2011: Norunn Østråt Koksvik (H)
- 2011-2023: Stanley Wirak (Ap)
- 2023–present: Kenny Rettore (H)

== Media gallery ==
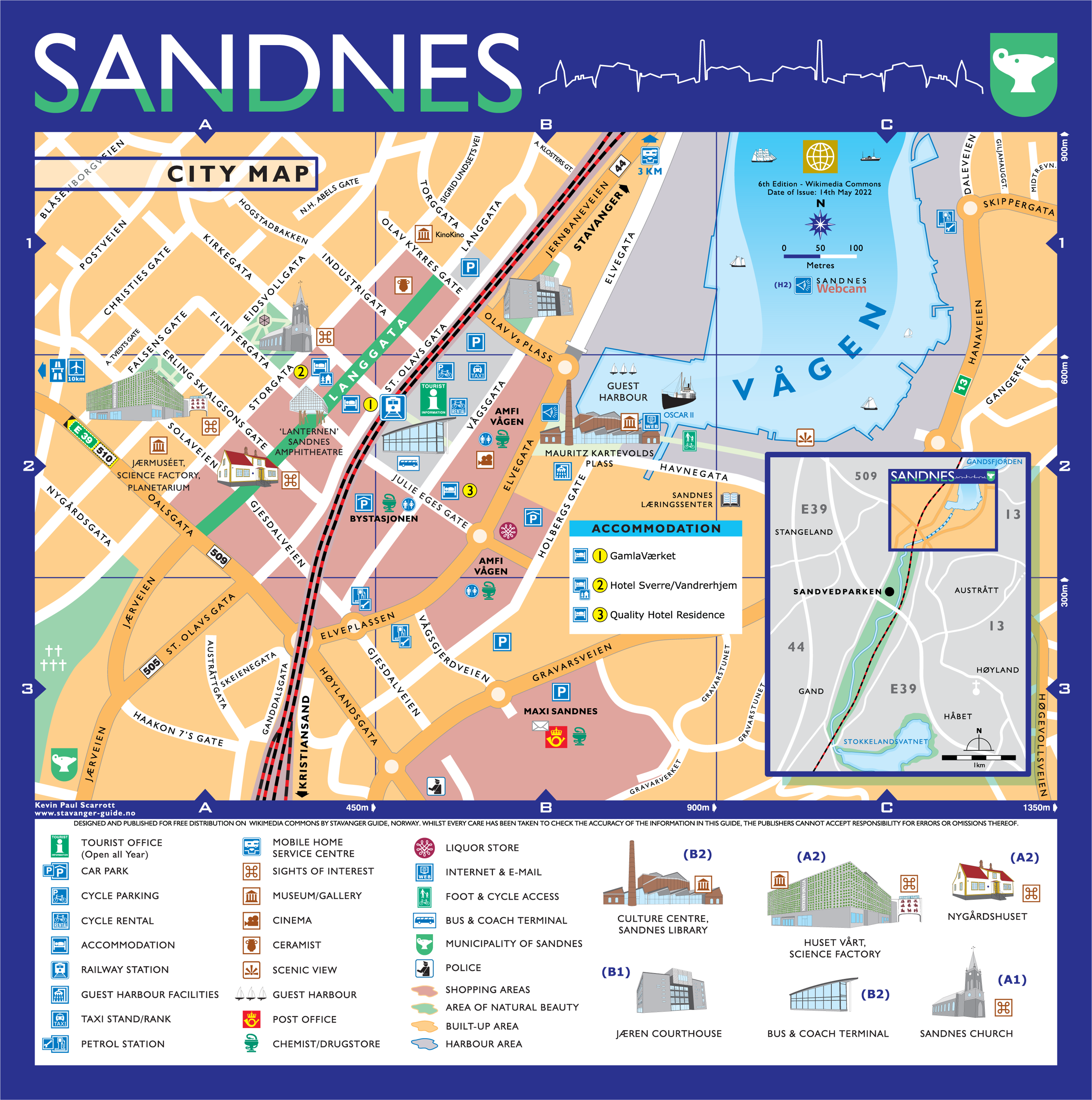
Map of Sandnes city center

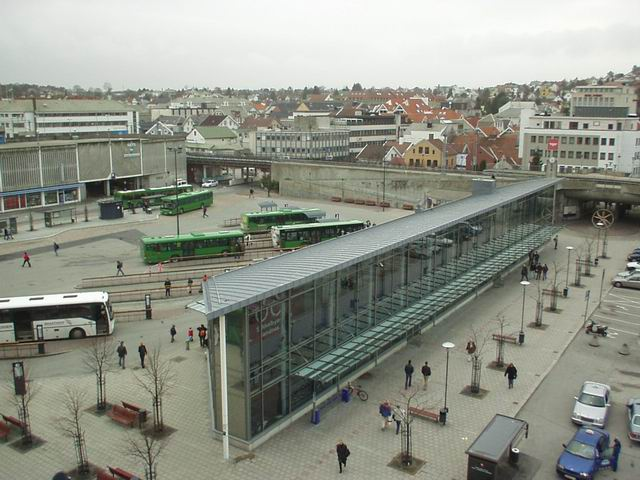
The bus station, known as Ruten

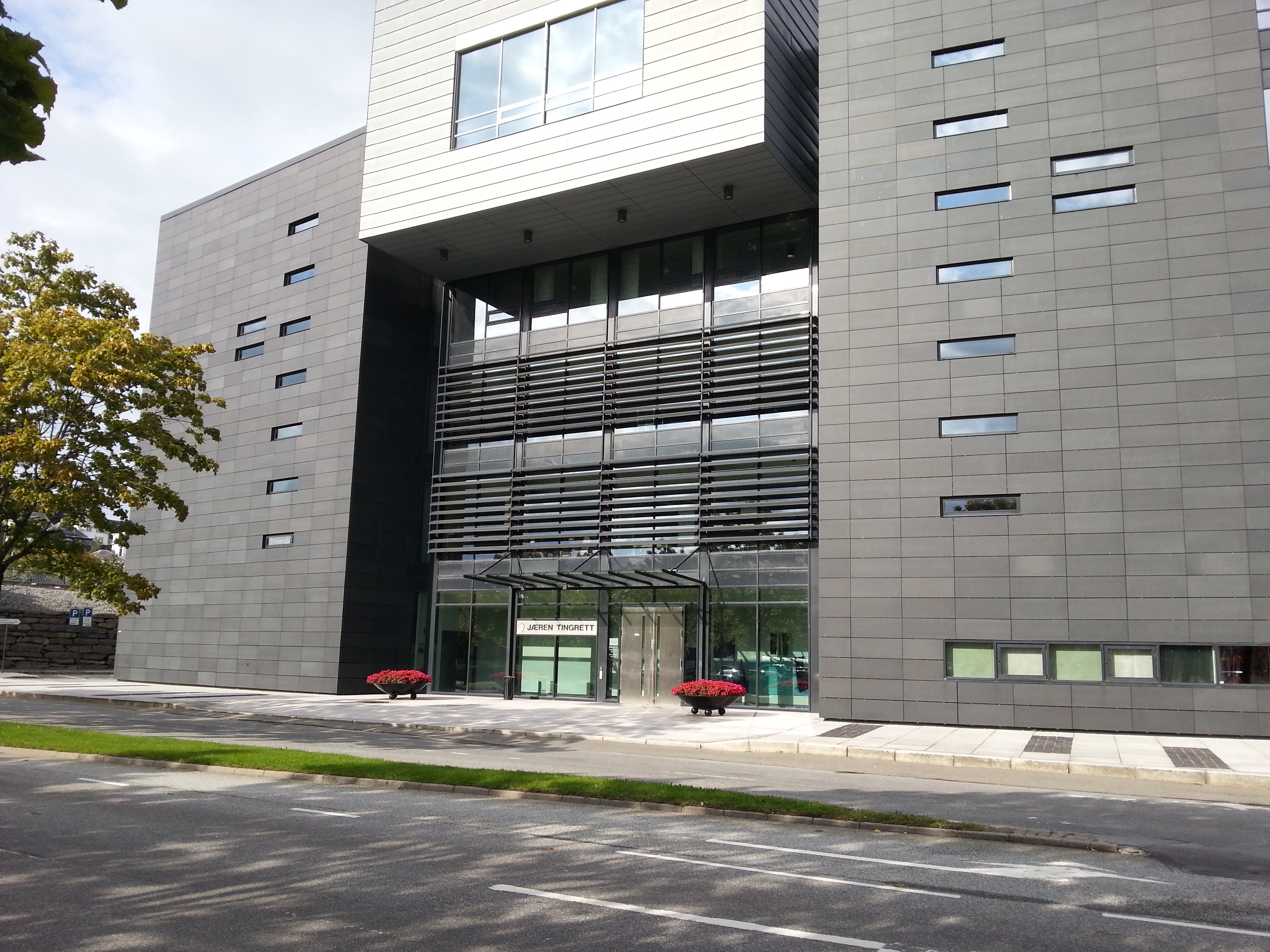
Sør-Rogaland District Court

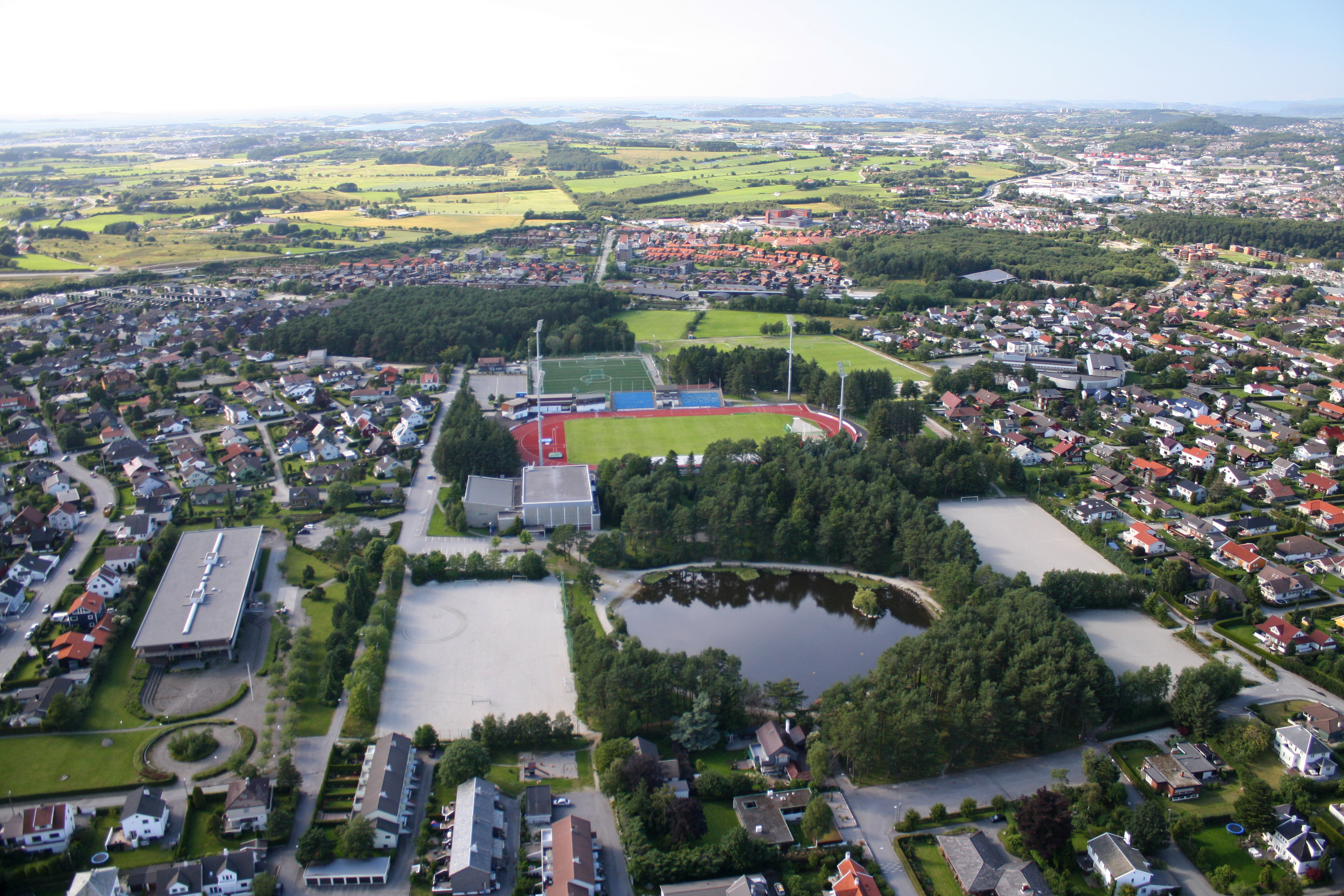
Sandnes sports park from the air

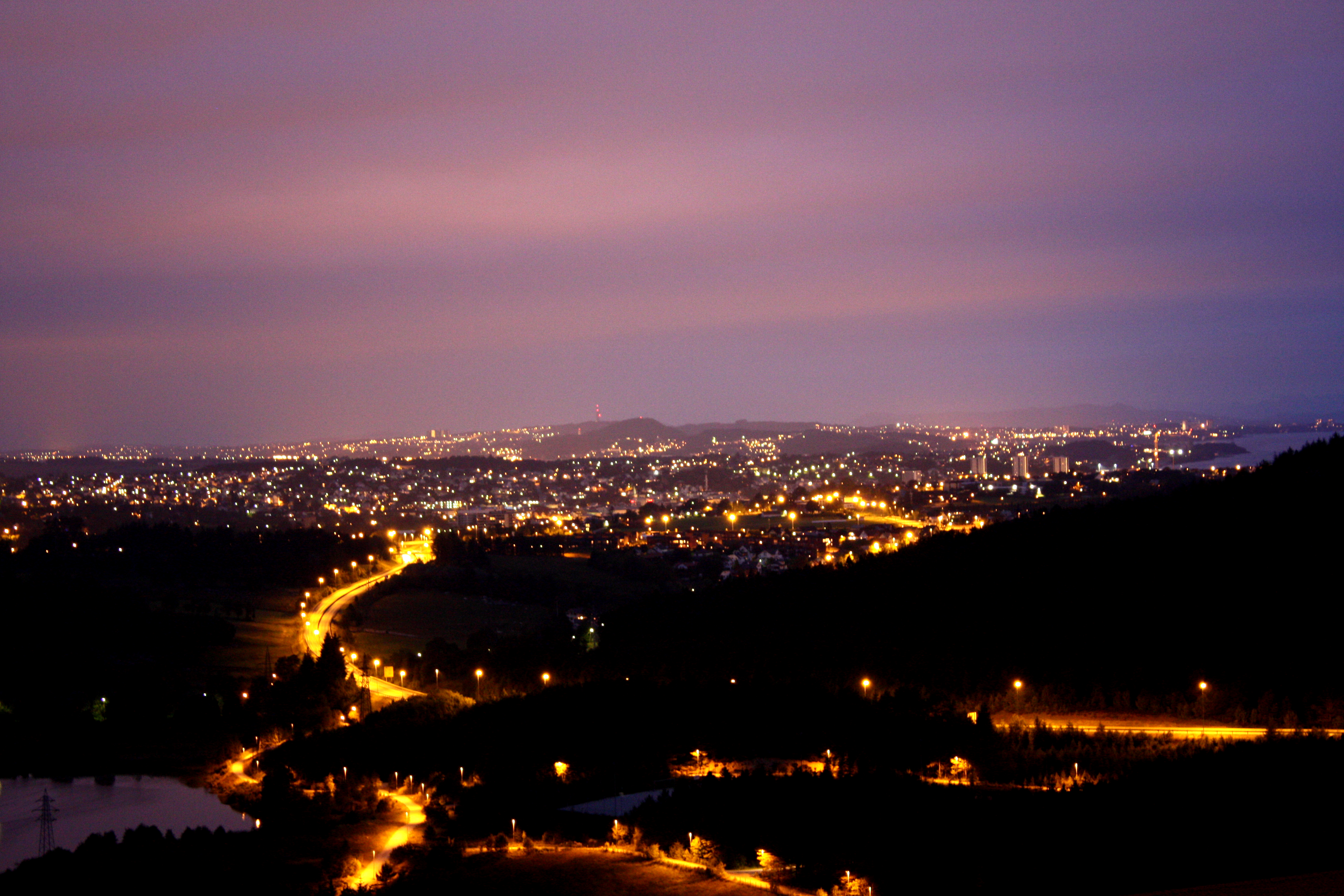
Sandnes by night

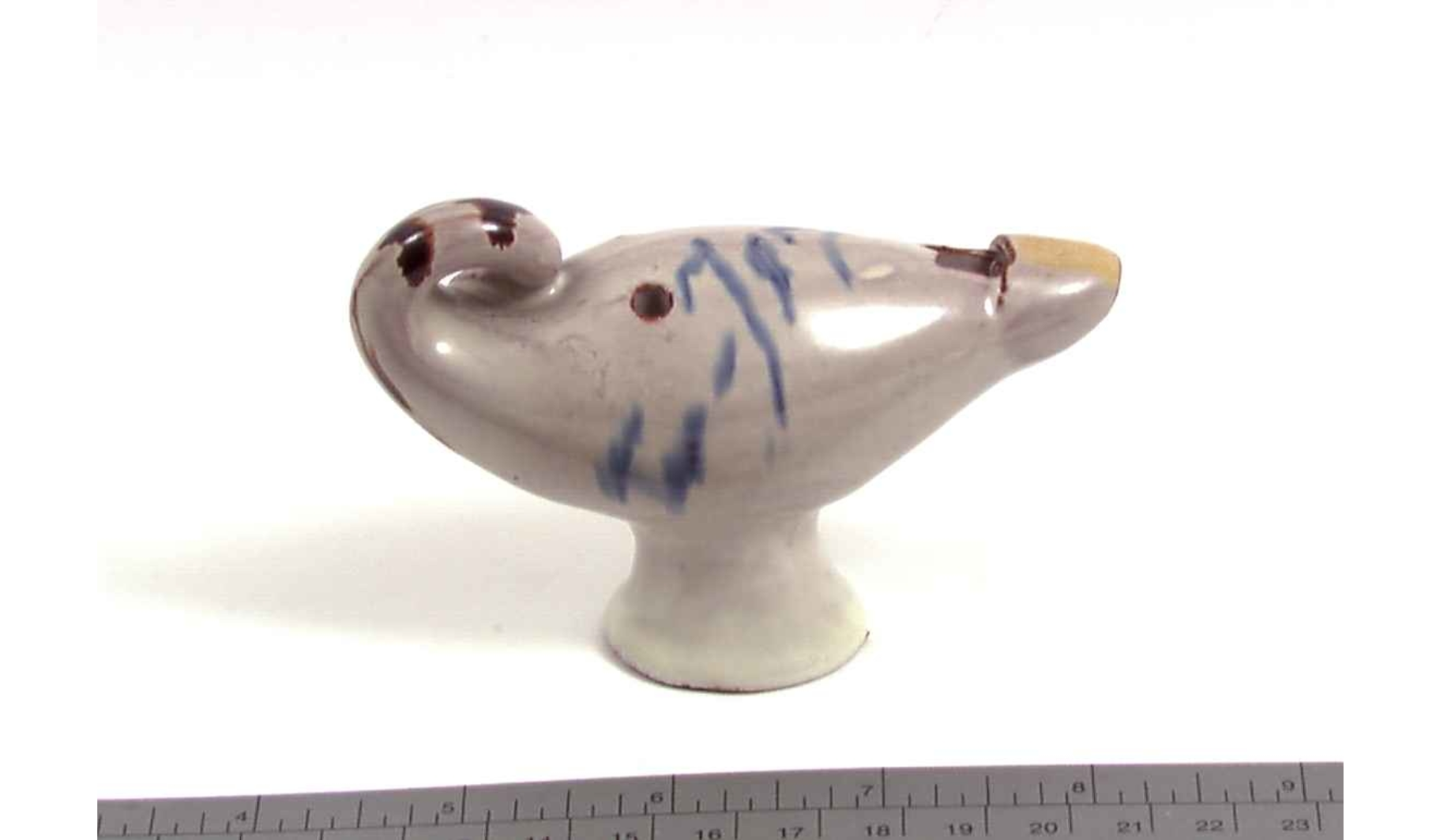
A Sandnesgauk. A clay toy originating in Sandnes.

== Economy ==
Historical population
| Year | Pop. | ±% |
|---|---|---|
| 1951 | 4,178 | — |
| 1961 | 3,981 | −4.7% |
| 1971 | 30,705 | +671.3% |
| 1981 | 36,901 | +20.2% |
| 1991 | 44,967 | +21.9% |
| 2001 | 53,860 | +19.8% |
| 2011 | 66,245 | +23.0% |
| 2016 | 74,820 | +12.9% |
Source: Statistics Norway

Sandnes hosts a large array of retail shops of most kinds and is used by the neighbouring municipalities appreciating the service and wide range of selections. Sandnes is known as Norway's bicycle city, mainly due to the fact that the bicycle manufacturer Øglænd DBS was situated here for decades. The city offers a variety of routes for everyday riders and tourists. Since 1996, a public bicycle rental program has been in operation in the city.

The city has a vibrant industrial base, mainly in the Ganddal area in the south and the Lura and Forus area in the north along the municipal boundary with Stavanger. There is significant activity related to oil exploration in the North Sea and also some IT-related companies. In this region between Sandnes and Stavanger, malls and department stores have also been established. Among these malls is one of Norway's biggest malls, Kvadrat, meaning 'square' (although it is not square shaped anymore as it has expanded several times since it opened in 1984).

Around 30% of the population is employed in Stavanger (Q4 2004). Sandnes was formerly known as the pottery town of Norway – due to the important ceramics industry based on the extensive occurrence of clay in the surroundings. The Vatneleiren military base is also located in Sandnes, just outside Vatne.

== Culture, sports, and education ==
Since 2016, the primary football team, Sandnes Ulf, has played in the second tier, 1. divisjon, of Norwegian professional football.

Sandnes is also known for its Rugby League team, Sandnes Raiders which has supplied the Norwegian national team with players.

The handball club Sandnes HK has played in the top division on several occasions.

The major tourist attraction in Sandnes is the Science Factory (Vitenfabrikken). It is a 4,000-square-metre (43,000 sq ft) science museum with science and art exhibitions, a planetarium, sun telescopes, and chemistry experiments.

Sandnes is the only city in Norway which is a member of the World Health Organization's network of Healthy Cities. Sandnes and Stavanger were chosen along with Liverpool, United Kingdom, to be a European Capital of Culture for 2008.

Higher education facilities include Sandnes Upper Secondary School, Gand Upper Secondary School, Akademiet Upper Secondary School, and Vågen Upper Secondary School. In 2010 Forus Upper Secondary School and parts of Lundehaugen merged to become Vågen. Lundehaugen still exists as a middle school.

The city is also home to the VID Specialized University Sandnes campus, a private Christian college.

=== Churches ===
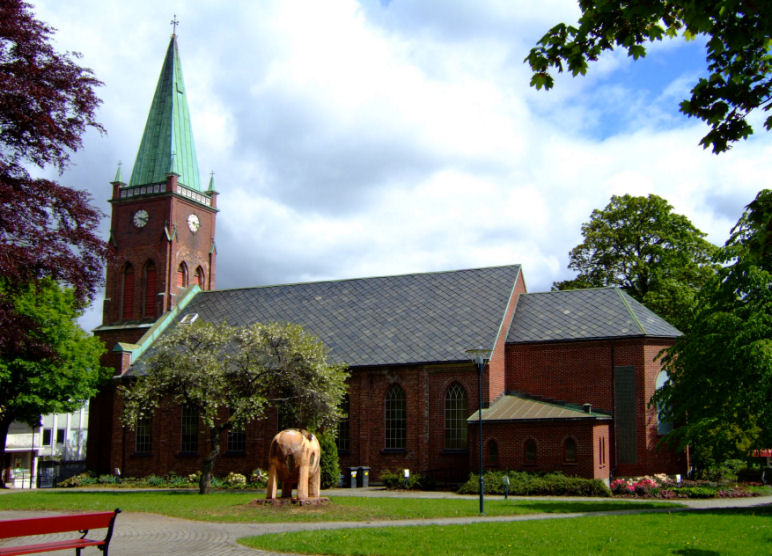
Sandnes Church

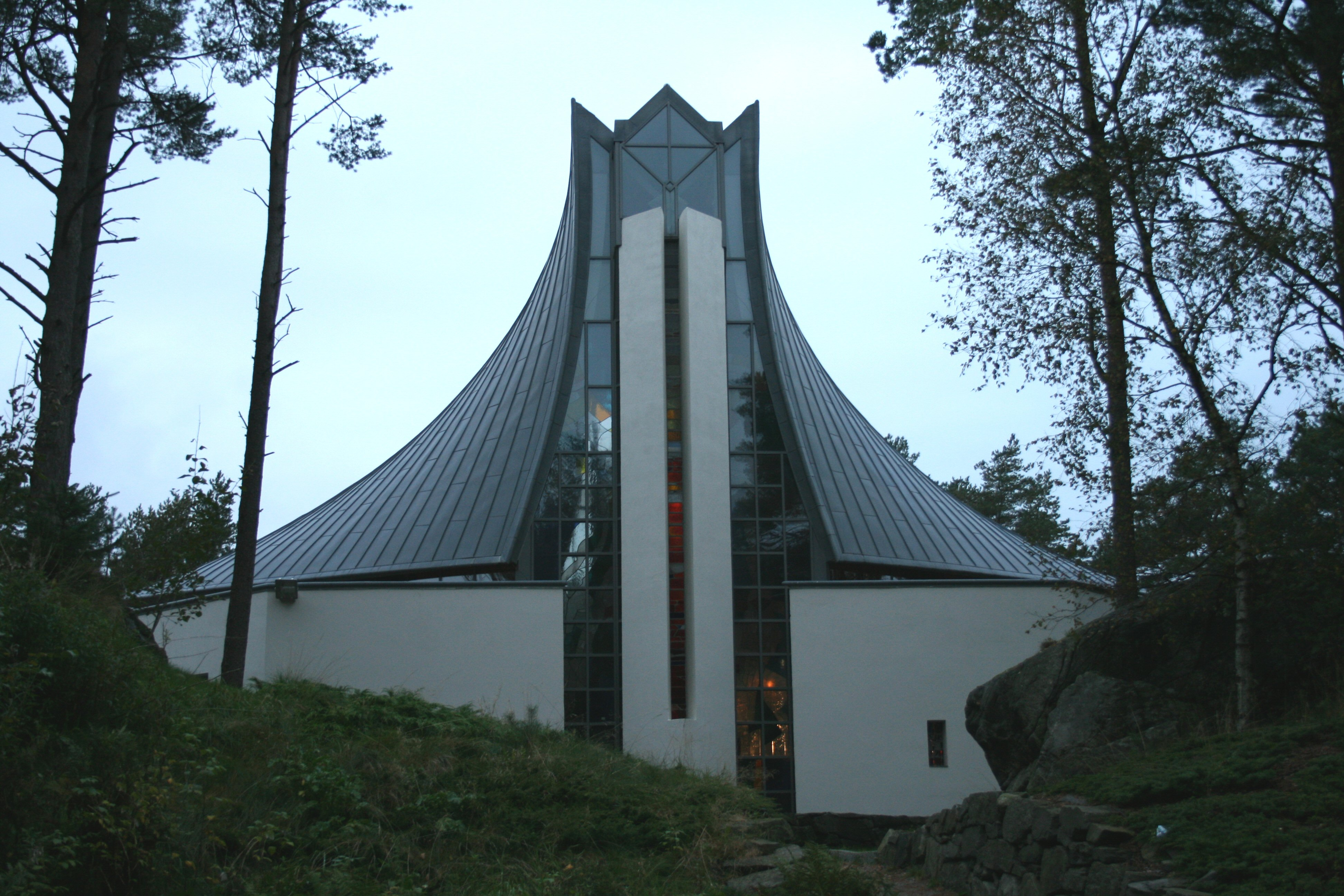
Hana Church

The Church of Norway has nine parishes (sokn) within Sandnes Municipality. It is part of the Sandnes prosti (deanery) in the Diocese of Stavanger. The main church for the city is Sandnes Church, which is the seat of the deanery which covers the whole municipality.

Churches in Sandnes Municipality
| Parish (sokn) | Church name | Location of the church | Year built |
|---|---|---|---|
| Bogafjell | Bogafjell Church | Bogafjell | 2012 |
| Forsand | Forsand Church | Forsand | 1854 |
| Forsand | Lyse Chapel | Lysebotn | 1961 |
| Gand | Gand Church | Sandved | 1978 |
| Gand | Julebygda Chapel | Malmheim og Soma | 1957 |
| Hana | Hana Church | Hana | 1997 |
| Høle | Høle Church | Høle | 1860 |
| Høyland | Høyland Church | Austrått | 1841 |
| Høyland | Sviland Chapel | Sviland | 1913 |
| Lura | Lura Church | Lura | 1987 |
| Riska | Riska Church | Hommersåk | 1999 |
| Riska | Old Riska Church | Hommersåk | 1877 |
| Sandnes | Sandnes Church | Sandnes sentrum | 1882 |

== Notable people ==
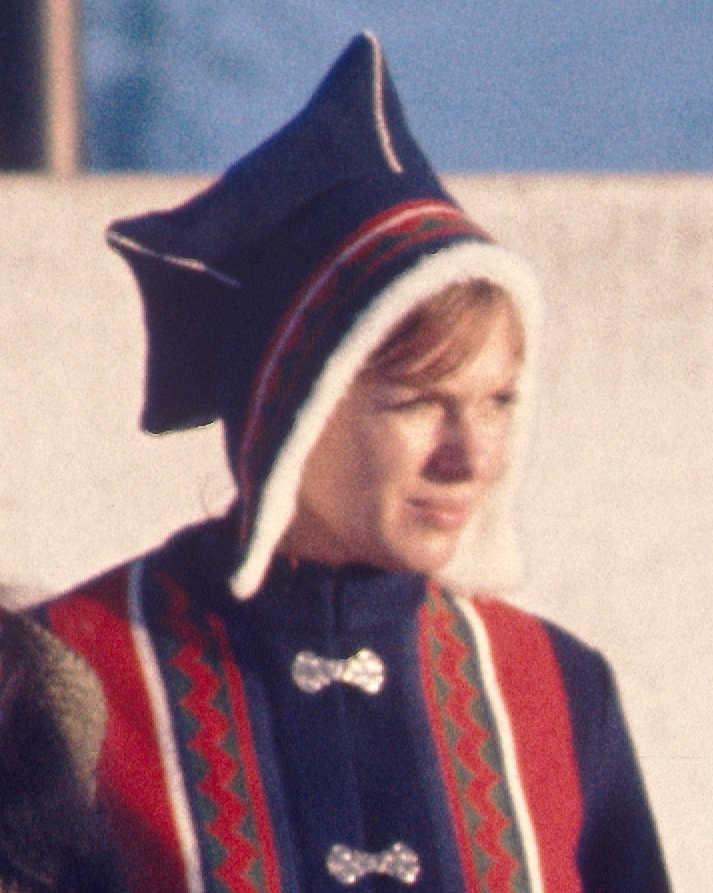
Julie Ege, On her Majesty's Secret Service, 1968

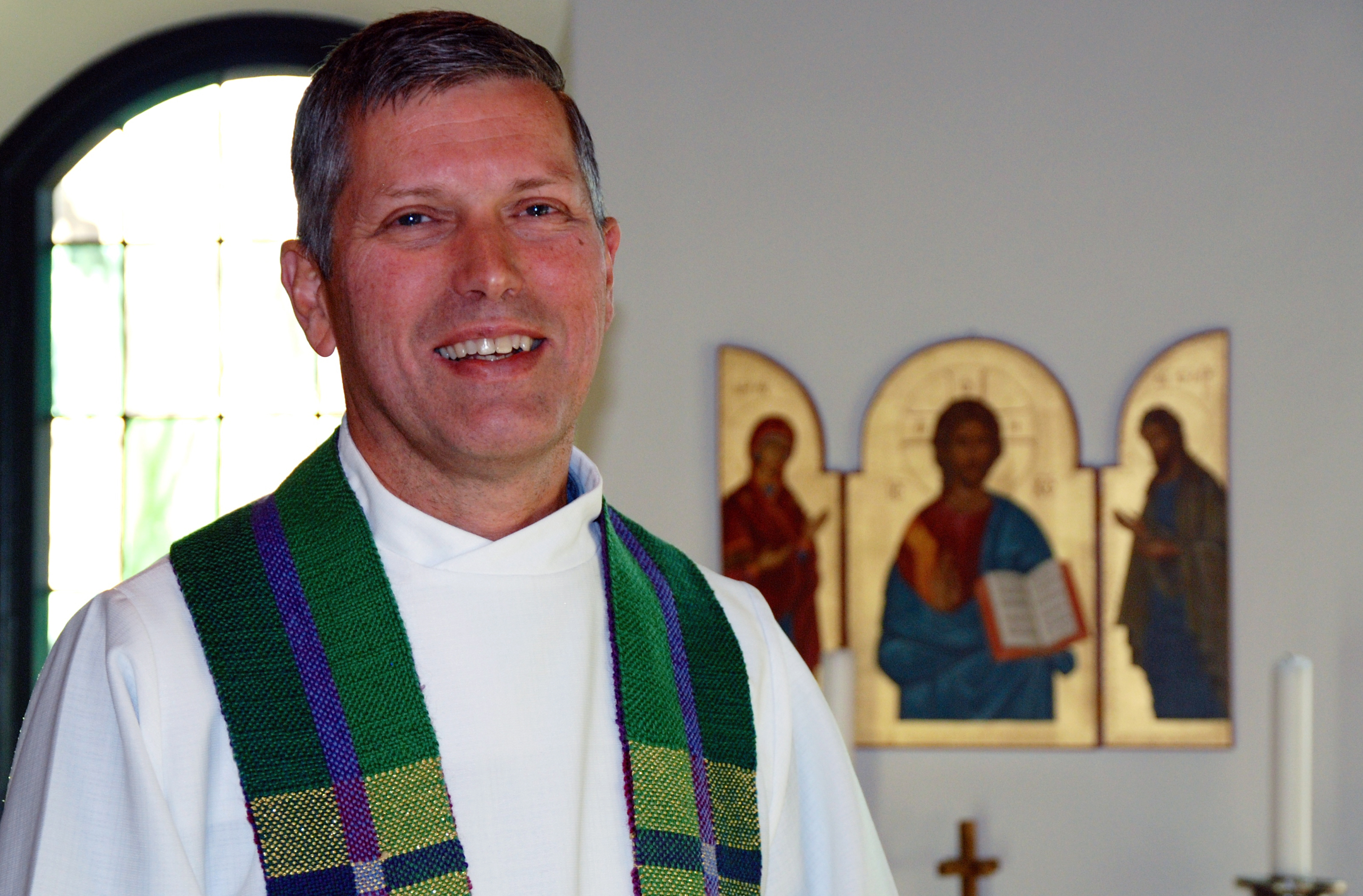
Ivar Braut, 2017

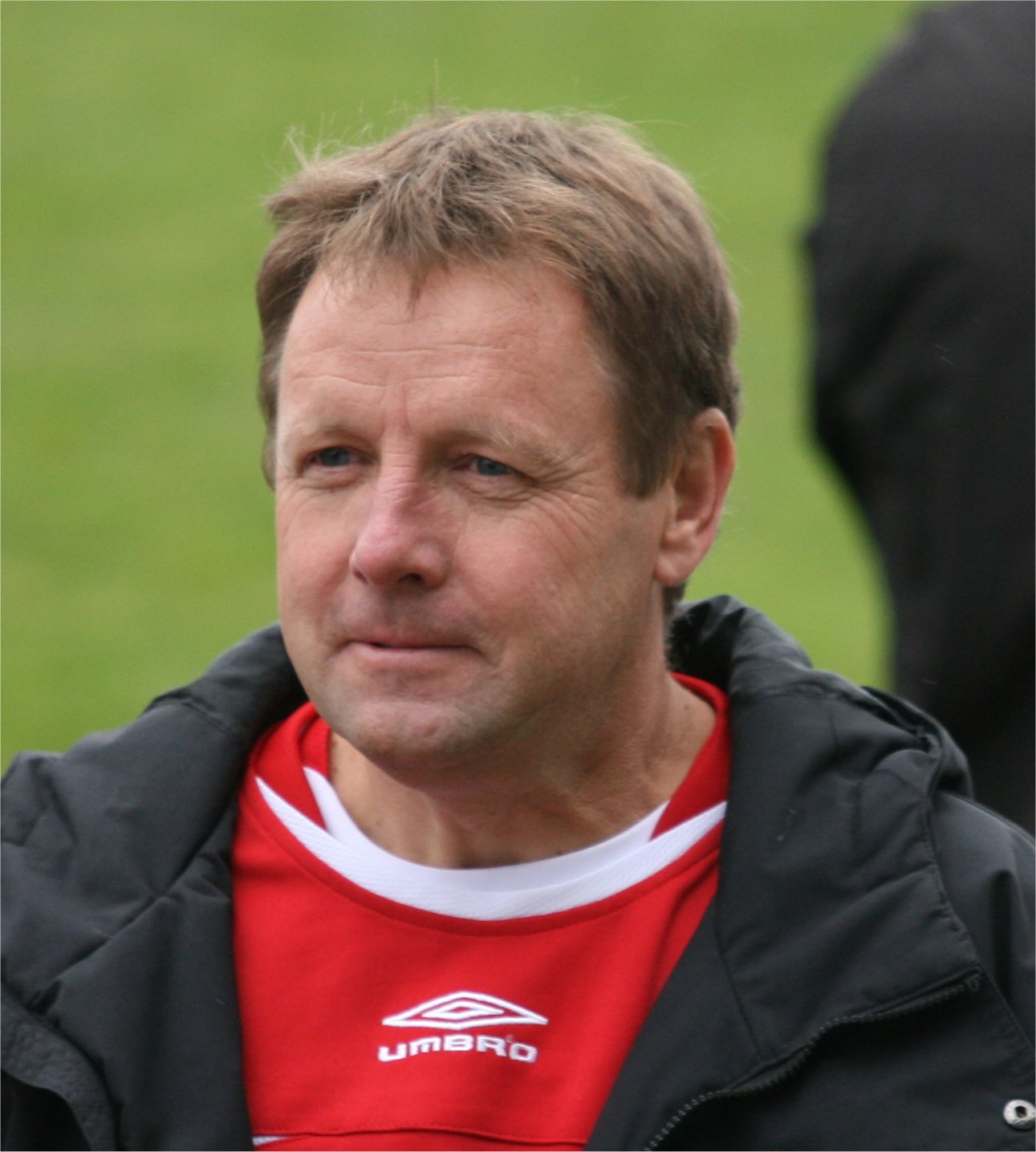
Bjarne Berntsen, 2007

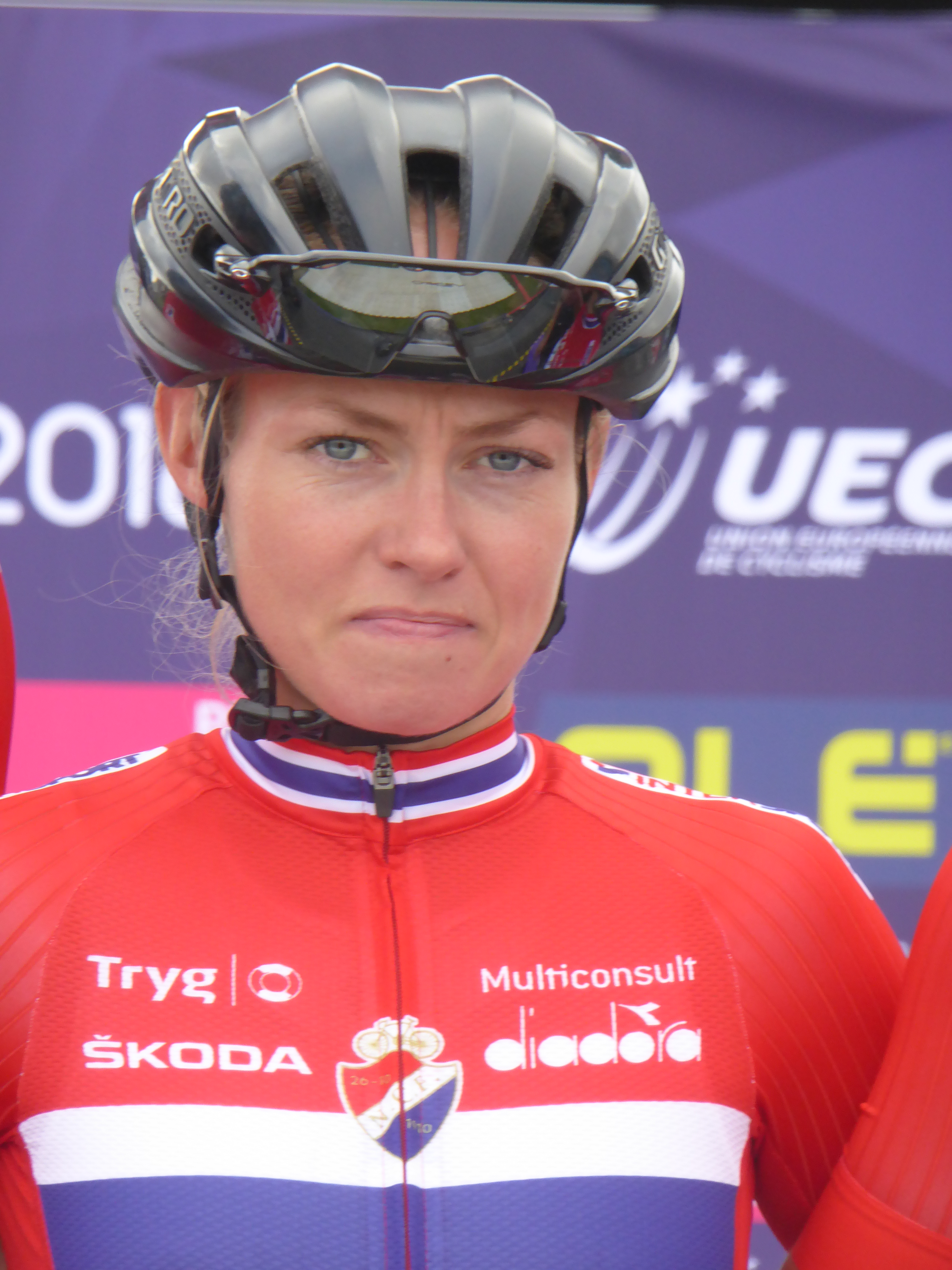
Stine Borgli, 2018

- Karen Grude Koht (1871 in Høyland – 1960) educationalist, essayist and feminist pioneer
- Theodor Thjøtta (1885 in Sandnes – 1955) physician, dealt with bacteriology and serology
- Elise Ottesen-Jensen (1886 in Hoyland − 1973) sex educator, journalist and anarchist
- Aaslaug Aasland (1890 in Sandnes – 1962) politician, Minister of Social Affairs, 1948 to 1953
- Toralv Øksnevad (1891 in Høyland – 1975) politician, journalist, newspaper editor and radio personality - the "voice from London" during WWII
- Sigrid Stray (1893 in Sandnes – 1978) barrister and proponent of women's rights
- Soffi Schønning (1895–1994) operatic soprano, lived in Sandnes in later life
- Kasper Idland MM, (1918 in Figgjo – 1968) Norwegian heavy water saboteur in 1943
- Kåre Berven Fjeldsaa (1918 in Sandnes – 1991) ceramic designer, early user of stoneware
- Tormod Førland (1920 in Høyland – 1995) chemist, worked on inorganic and physical chemistry
- Arne Sandnes (1925–2006) politician, mayor of Sandnes in the 1970s
- Roald G. Bergsaker (born 1942) sports official and politician, mayor of Sandnes, 1986 to 1990 and Rogaland county mayor, 1999 to 2007
- Julie Ege (1943 in Sandnes – 2008) actress and model
- Ivar Braut (born 1956 in Sandnes) a theologian and priest, the Bishop of Stavanger, 2017–2019
- Roger Rasmussen (born ca.1965 in Sandnes) stage name Nattefrost, vocalist and founder of Carpathian Forest, a black metal band
- Mette Grøtteland (born 1969 in Sandnes) first female fighter pilot, Royal Norwegian Air Force
- Kjartan Salvesen (born 1976 in Sandnes) winner of Norwegian Idol TV series in 2004
- Thomas Dybdahl (born 1979 in Sandnes) singer-songwriter
- Anh Vu (born 1986 in Sandnes) singer and actress
- Annette Obrestad (born 1988) professional poker player; won the 2007 World Series of Poker Europe aged 18; lives in Sandnes

=== Sport ===
- Bjarne Berntsen (born 1956 in Sandnes) a former football player with 33 caps with Norway and coach with Norway women (2005–2009), Viking FK, and Sandnes Ulf
- Anne Brit Skjæveland (born 1962) retired heptathlete, lives in Sandnes
- Linda Medalen (born 1965 in Sandnes) former footballer, 152 caps with Norway women
- Gjert Ingebrigtsen (born 1966) sports coach, father and coach of sons Henrik, Filip and Jakob; lives in Sandnes
- Rolf Bae (1975 in Sandnes – 2008) Arctic adventurer and mountaineer
- Arild Haugen (born 1985) former strongman, currently a professional boxer; lives in Sandnes
- Stine Borgli (born 1990 in Sandnes) racing cyclist
- 1500-metre runner brothers:
  - Henrik Ingebrigtsen (born 1991 in Sandnes), competed at the 2012 and 2016 Summer Olympics
  - Filip Ingebrigtsen (born 1993 in Sandnes), competed at the European and World Athletics Championships
  - Jakob Ingebrigtsen (born 2000 in Sandnes), two gold medals at the 2018 European Athletics Championships, Olympic champion over 1500 meters in Tokyo 2020.
