= Austrått (disambiguation) =

Austrått may refer to:

- Austrått, a manor in Ørland municipality in Trøndelag county, Norway
- Austrått Fort, a former coastal artillery site located in Ørland municipality in Trøndelag county, Norway
- Austrått, Rogaland, a borough in the city of Sandnes in Rogaland county, Norway

== See also ==
- Inger til Austrått, a wealthy Norwegian landowner from the 1500s
