= Stokka, Sandnes =

Neighborhood in Sandes, Norway

Coordinates: 58°52′59″N 5°43′4″E

Stokka is a neighborhood in the borough of Lura in the northwestern corner of the city of Sandnes which lies in the far western edge of the large Sandnes Municipality in Rogaland county, Norway. Stokka is bordered on the south by the borough of Malmheim og Soma, to the east by the urban part of the borough of Lura, to the north by Forus in the neighboring Stavanger Municipality, and to the west by Sola Municipality. Large parts of the area are industrialised, with the area north of the road Løwenstrasse used as the headquarters of Forus Næringspark. The European route E39 highway runs along the east side of Stokka.
