= Bogafjell =

Borough in Sandnes, Norway

Bydel Bogafjell
- Borough
- Coat of arms

- Location within Sandnes Municipality
- Interactive map of Bydel Bogafjell
- Coordinates: 58°49′06″N 05°45′16″E
- Country: Norway
- Region: Western Norway
- County: Rogaland
- District: Jæren
- City: Sandnes

Area
  - Total: 7.1 km^{2} (2.7 sq mi)

Population (2016)
  - Total: 7,080
  - Density: 1,000/km^{2} (2,600/sq mi)
- Time zone: UTC+01:00 (CET)
  - Summer (DST): UTC+02:00 (CEST)
- Post Code: 4324 Sandnes

Bogafjell is a borough of the city of Sandnes in the west part of the large Sandnes Municipality in Rogaland county, Norway. The borough lies south of the city centre, surrounding the Bogafjell mountain. The borough has a population (2016) of 7,080. The borough was created in 2011 when it was split off from the borough of Austrått. The area is a relatively new area that has become built up in the since the turn of the century. There are three schools in the borough as well as Bogafjell Church.
