= Arne Sandnes (Rogaland) =

Norwegian politician

Arne Sandnes (born 27 September 1925 in Hetland Municipality, died 23 December 2006) was a Norwegian politician for the Conservative Party.

He served as a deputy representative to the Norwegian Parliament from Rogaland during the terms 1977–1981 and 1981–1985.

On the local level he was mayor of Sandnes Municipality in the periods 1974–1975, 1978–1979 and 1979–1981 and deputy mayor in the periods 1971–1973, 1975–1977 and 1982–1983. From 1971 to 1975 and 1979 to 1991 he was a member of Rogaland county council.

His professional career was spent in the military, in Norway and in UNMOGIP.
