= Stangeland, Sandnes =

Borough in Sandnes, Norway

Bydel Stangeland
- Borough
- Coat of arms

- Location within Sandnes Municipality
- Interactive map of Bydel Stangeland
- Coordinates: 58°48′N 05°39′E
- Country: Norway
- Region: Western Norway
- County: Rogaland
- District: Jæren
- City: Sandnes

Area
  - Total: 1.8 km^{2} (0.69 sq mi)

Population (2016)
  - Total: 7,560
  - Density: 4,200/km^{2} (11,000/sq mi)
- Time zone: UTC+01:00 (CET)
  - Summer (DST): UTC+02:00 (CEST)
- Post Code: 4318 Sandnes

Stangeland is a borough of the city of Sandnes in the west part of the large Sandnes Municipality in Rogaland county, Norway. The small, 1.8-square-kilometre (0.69 sq mi) borough has a population (2016) of 7,560. The borough is located just southwest of downtown Sandnes.
