= Lura, Norway =

Borough in Sandnes, Norway

Bydel Lura
- Borough
- Coat of arms

- Location within Sandnes Municipality
- Interactive map of Bydel Lura
- Coordinates: 58.87218°N 5.73975°E
- Country: Norway
- Region: Western Norway
- County: Rogaland
- District: Jæren
- City: Sandnes

Area
  - Total: 8 km^{2} (3.1 sq mi)

Population (2016)
  - Total: 8,605
  - Density: 1,100/km^{2} (2,800/sq mi)
- Time zone: UTC+01:00 (CET)
  - Summer (DST): UTC+02:00 (CEST)
- Post Code: 4313 Sandnes

Lura is a borough of the city of Sandnes in the western part of the large Sandnes Municipality in Rogaland county, Norway. The 8-square-kilometre (3.1 sq mi) borough lies in the northwestern part of the city, just north of the city centre of Sandnes and just south of the city of Stavanger. The borough has a population (2016) of 8,605. Lura Church, built in 1987 in a fan-shaped design, is the main church for the borough. Lura school is one of the primary schools there, with grades from 1–7.
