= Austrått, Rogaland =

Borough in Sandnes, Norway

Bydel Austrått
- Borough
- Coat of arms

- Location within Sandnes Municipality
- Interactive map of Bydel Austrått
- Coordinates: 58°50′25″N 05°44′23″E
- Country: Norway
- Region: Western Norway
- County: Rogaland
- District: Jæren
- City: Sandnes

Area
  - Total: 6 km^{2} (2.3 sq mi)

Population (2016)
  - Total: 8,251
  - Density: 1,400/km^{2} (3,600/sq mi)
- Time zone: UTC+01:00 (CET)
  - Summer (DST): UTC+02:00 (CEST)
- Post Code: 4325 Sandnes

Austrått is a borough of the city of Sandnes in the western part of the large Sandnes Municipality in Rogaland county, Norway. The 6-square-kilometre (2.3 sq mi) borough lies just southeast of the main city centre of Sandnes. The borough has a population (2016) of 8,251. Austrått was part of the borough of Bogafjell prior to 2011, when it was split off as a separate borough. Høyland Church is located in Austrått.
