= Lura Church =

Church in Rogaland, Norway

- Lura kirke
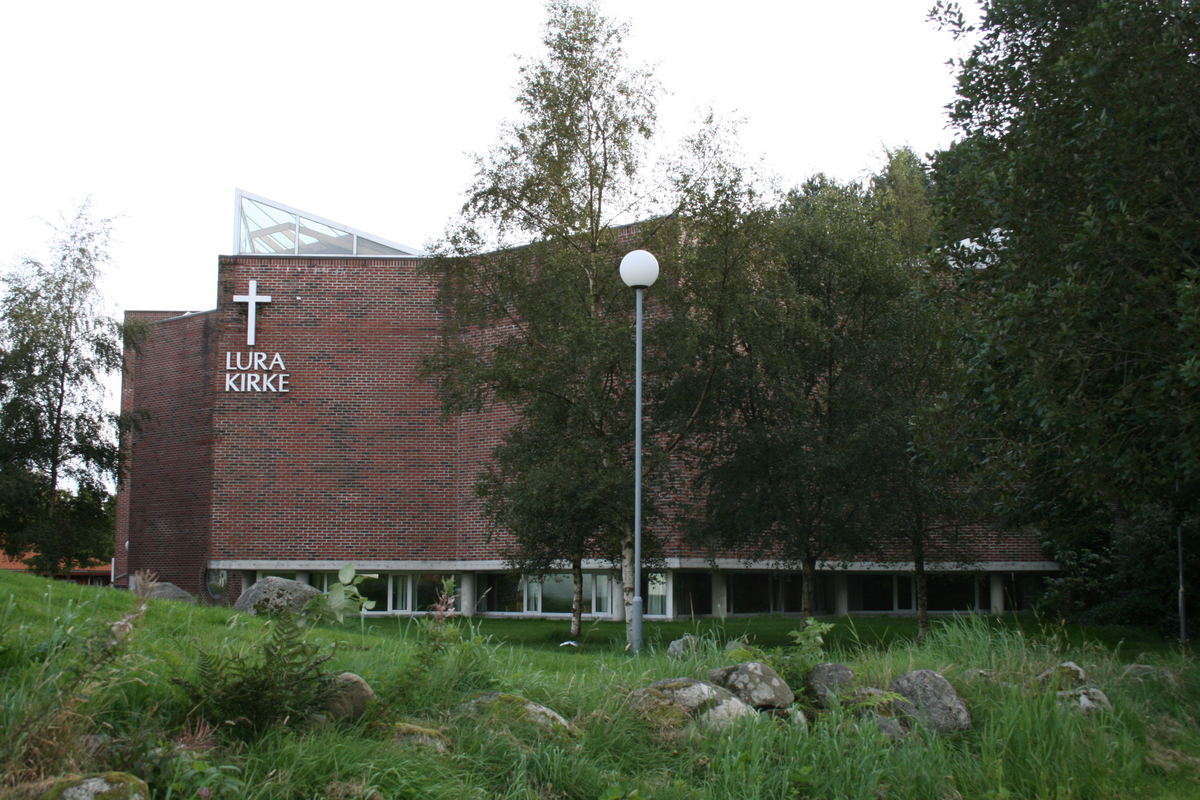
- View of the church
- Lura Church
- 58.872646°N 5.731667°E
- Location: Sandnes, Rogaland
- Country: Norway
- Denomination: Church of Norway
- Churchmanship: Evangelical Lutheran

History
- Status: Parish church
- Founded: 1987
- Consecrated: 1987

Architecture
- Functional status: Active
- Architect(s): Ingeborg Hoem and Knut Hoem
- Architectural type: Fan-shaped
- Completed: 1987

Specifications
- Capacity: 320
- Materials: Brick

Administration
- Diocese: Stavanger bispedømme
- Deanery: Sandnes prosti
- Parish: Lura

Lura Church (Norwegian: Lura kirke) is a parish church of the Church of Norway in the large Sandnes Municipality in Rogaland county, Norway. It is located in the borough of Lura in the northern part of the city of Sandnes in the extreme western part of the municipality. It is the church for the Lura parish which is part of the Sandnes prosti (deanery) in the Diocese of Stavanger. The red, brick church was built in a fan-shaped design in 1987 using plans drawn up by the architects Ingeborg and Knut Hoem. The church design was approved in 1984. The church seats about 320 people.

== See also ==
- List of churches in Rogaland
