= Akademiet Norge =

Private school network in Norway

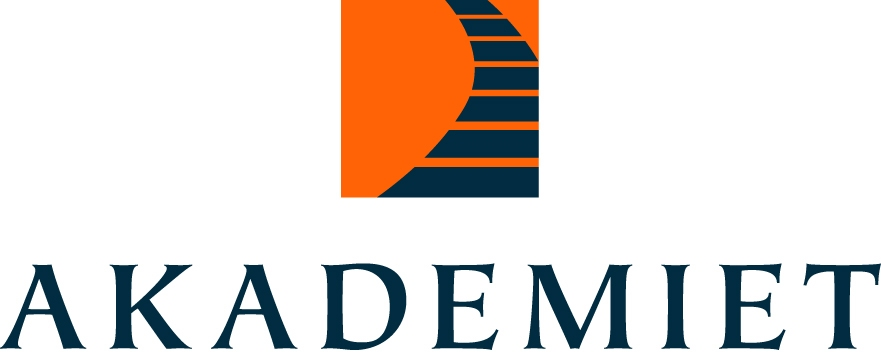
- Company type: Public
- Industry: Education
- Founded: 2010
- Headquarters: 59°44′25″N 10°10′55″E, DrammenTynset Bygdemuseum, Buskerud, Norway
- Area served: Norway
- Key people: Kjetil Eide (Chairman)
- Number of employees: Apx. 500 (Jul 2020)
- Website: akademiet.no

Akademiet Norge is a Norwegian private education institution. Consisting of several schools in several cities, it is the largest private school chain of this type in the country.

== History ==
Akademiet was originally established as a private vocational school in Oslo in 1997. In 2004 and 2005, six upper secondary schools were established in the cities of Oslo, Drammen, Stavanger, Bergen, Ålesund and Molde. As the (social democratic) government subsequently passed laws preventing the establishment of new private schools, Akademiet focused instead on developing alternatives such as Montessori schools, which did not fall under these regulations. In the summer of 2015, five new schools became a part of Akademiet. In the last 4 years Akademiet Drammen has been the school with best results in Utdanningsdirektoratets elevundersøkelse. In July 2020 it was announced that Akademiet had passed 500 employees and 8000 students.

== The schools ==
Akademiet administers 15 colleges, and two elementary schools in several cities (see below). In addition to this they operate 7 schools for independent or part-time students not enrolled in a standard school. The company has also begun offering web-based learning. The organisation itself functions as a secretariat for the schools and assists them with administration and development.

The upper secondary schools receive government grants and as such must follow the official curriculum and are subject to government regulation. For instance, acceptance of student applications is based on grades from previous institutions only; no discrimination is allowed. This fact separates Akademiet from other independent schools where students may be offered places based on the results of interviews or other criteria.

The upper secondary schools are:

- Akademiet Ålesund
- Akademiet Bergen
- Akademiet Sundland, Drammen
- Akademiet Ypsilon, Drammen
- Akademiet Fredrikstad
- Akademiet Kristiansand
- Akademiet Oslo
- Akademiet Sandnes
- Heltberg Toppidrettsgymnas Ålesund, Oslo
- Heltberg Toppidrettsgymnas Molde
- Heltberg Private Gymnas Drammen
- Heltberg Private Gymnas Bislett, Oslo
- Heltberg Private Gymnas Ullevaal, Oslo

The schools for private education (no: privatistundervisning) offer education to students who lack certain courses or diplomas necessary to obtain a general university admissions certificate or to improve grades from previous upper secondary school education. Exams are held by the county, while education and tutoring are managed by the individual schools.

The school offering alternative pedagogic education (Montessori) is Heltberg private gymnasium in Drammen. It opened in 2013.
