= Bogafjell Church =

Church in Rogaland, Norway

- Bogafjell kirke
- Bogafjell Church
- 58.820615°N 5.746495°E
- Location: Sandnes, Rogaland
- Country: Norway
- Denomination: Church of Norway
- Churchmanship: Evangelical Lutheran

History
- Status: Parish church
- Founded: 2012
- Consecrated: 4 Mar 2012

Architecture
- Functional status: Active
- Architect: Grete G. Krogedal
- Architectural type: Rectangular
- Groundbreaking: 2011
- Completed: 2012

Specifications
- Capacity: 400
- Materials: Concrete

Administration
- Diocese: Stavanger bispedømme
- Deanery: Sandnes prosti
- Parish: Bogafjell

Bogafjell Church (Norwegian: Bogafjell kirke) is a parish church of the Church of Norway in the western part of the large Sandnes Municipality in Rogaland county, Norway. It is located in the borough of Bogafjell, just south of the centre of the city of Sandnes. It is the church for the Bogafjell parish which is part of the Sandnes prosti (deanery) in the Diocese of Stavanger. The gray, concrete church was built in a rectangular design in 2012 using designs by the architect Grete Gudmestad Krogedal from the company Rambøll Arkitektur. The 2,500-square-metre (27,000 sq ft) church seats about 400 people. The church was consecrated on 4 March 2012.

== See also ==
- List of churches in Rogaland
