= Forsand =

Forsand may refer to:

== Places ==
- Forsand (village), a village in Sandnes Municipality in Rogaland county, Norway
- Forsand Municipality , a borough in Sandnes and former municipality in Rogaland county, Norway
- Forsand Church, a church in Sandnes Municipality in Rogaland county, Norway

== Other ==
- Forsand IL, a sports club based in Sandnes Municipality in Rogaland county, Norway
