= Sviland Church =

Church in Rogaland, Norway

- Sviland kyrkje
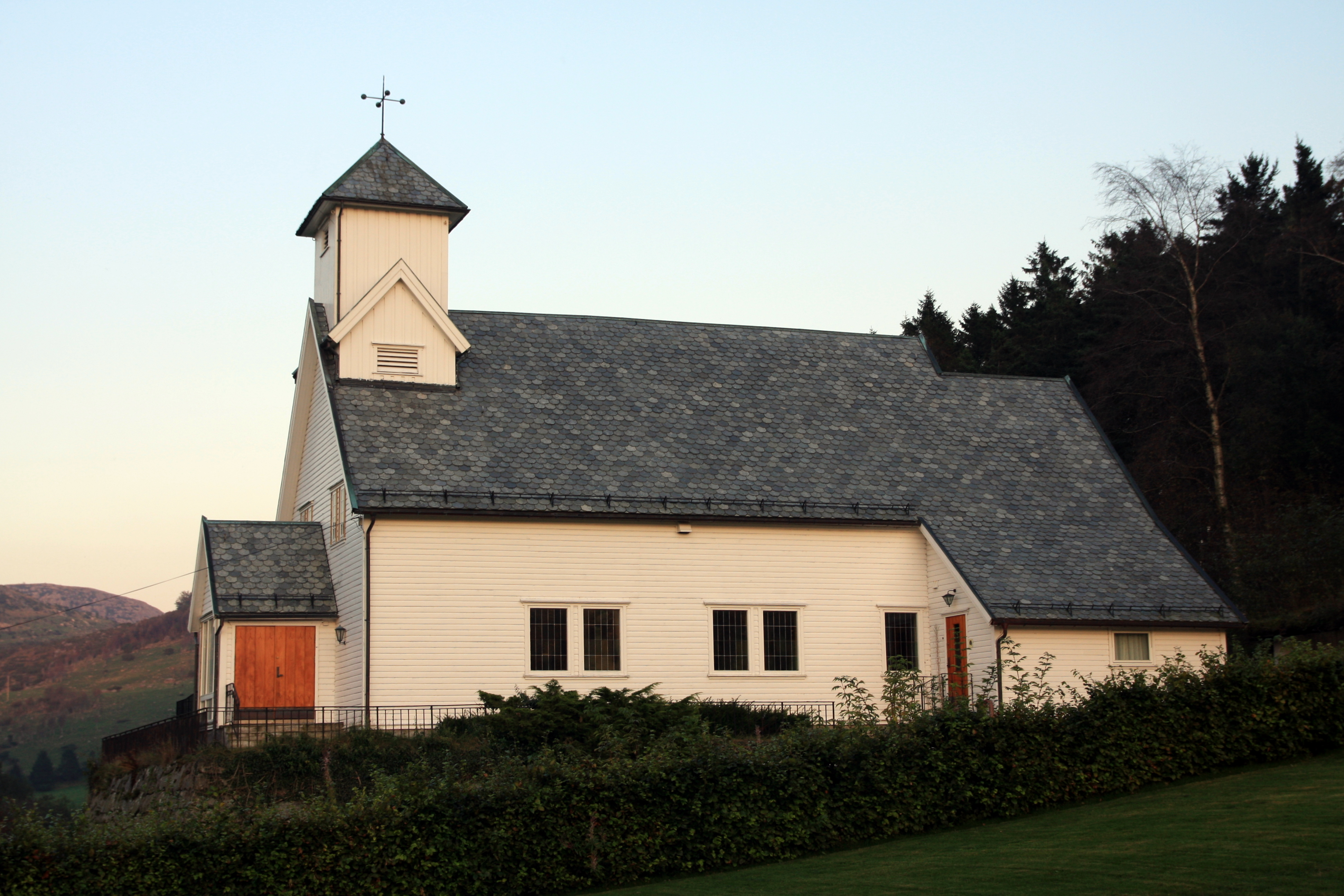
- View of the church
- Sviland Church
- 58.828529°N 5.82782°E
- Location: Sandnes, Rogaland
- Country: Norway
- Denomination: Church of Norway
- Churchmanship: Evangelical Lutheran

History
- Former name: Sviland Chapel (Sviland kapell)
- Status: Parish church
- Founded: 1913
- Consecrated: 1913

Architecture
- Functional status: Active
- Architect: Michael Slettebø
- Architectural type: Long church
- Completed: 1913

Specifications
- Capacity: 140
- Materials: Wood

Administration
- Diocese: Stavanger bispedømme
- Deanery: Sandnes prosti
- Parish: Høyland
- Norwegian Cultural Heritage Site
- Type: Church
- Status: Not protected
- ID: 85019

Sviland Church (Norwegian: Sviland kyrkje) is a parish church of the Church of Norway in the large Sandnes Municipality in Rogaland county, Norway. It is located in the village of Sviland in the rural borough of Sviland on the eastern edge of the city of Sandnes which is in the western part of the municipality. It is one of the two churches for the Høyland parish which is part of the Sandnes prosti (deanery) in the Diocese of Stavanger. The white, wooden church was built in a long church design in 1913 using designs by the architect Michael Slettebø. The church seats about 140 people.

== History ==
In 1905, some of the initial site work began at the site of the new chapel. Construction began in 1911 and it was completed in 1913. The new building was consecrated on 23 October 1913. The ceremony was notable in that the Bishop Kristian Vilhelm Koren Schjelderup Sr. who was leading the consecration became ill during the service and he died shortly thereafter.

Historically, this church was known as Sviland Chapel (Norwegian: Sviland kapell). On 21 March 2019, the diocese council voted to rename it as "Sviland Church" (Nynorsk: Sviland kyrkje) effective 1 April 2019.

== Media gallery ==
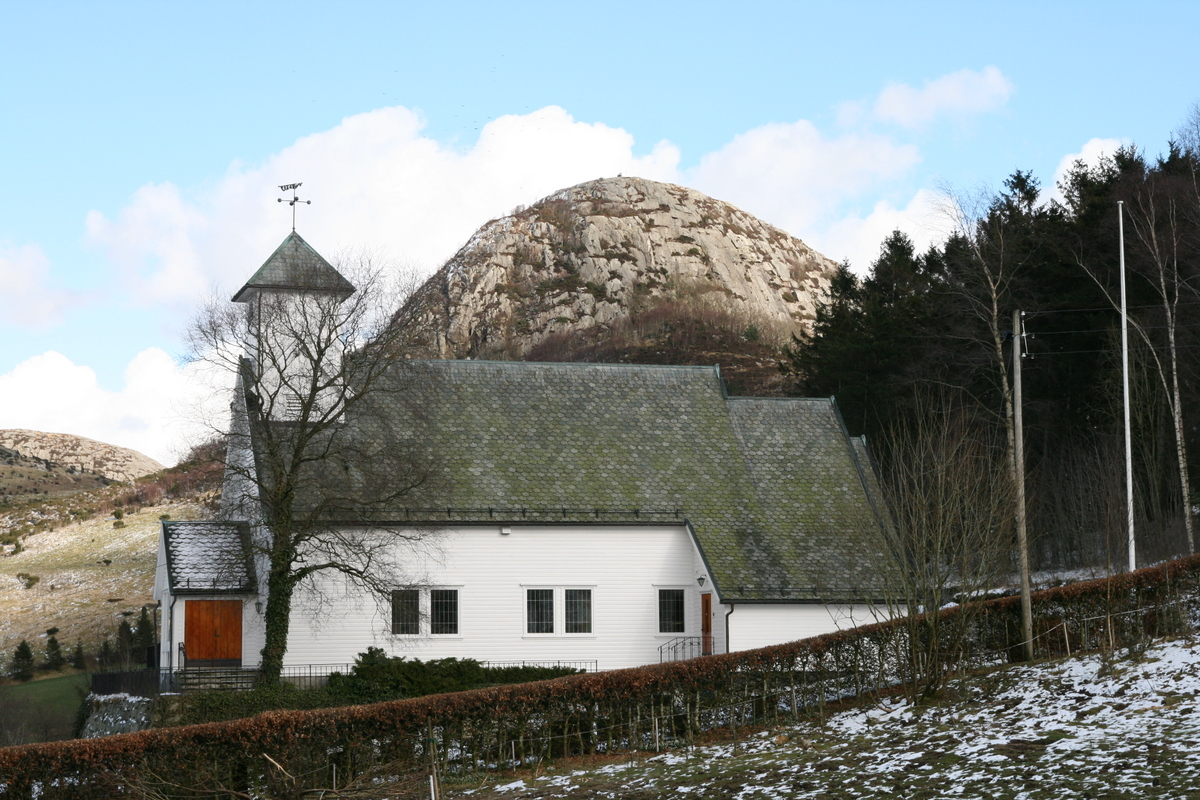

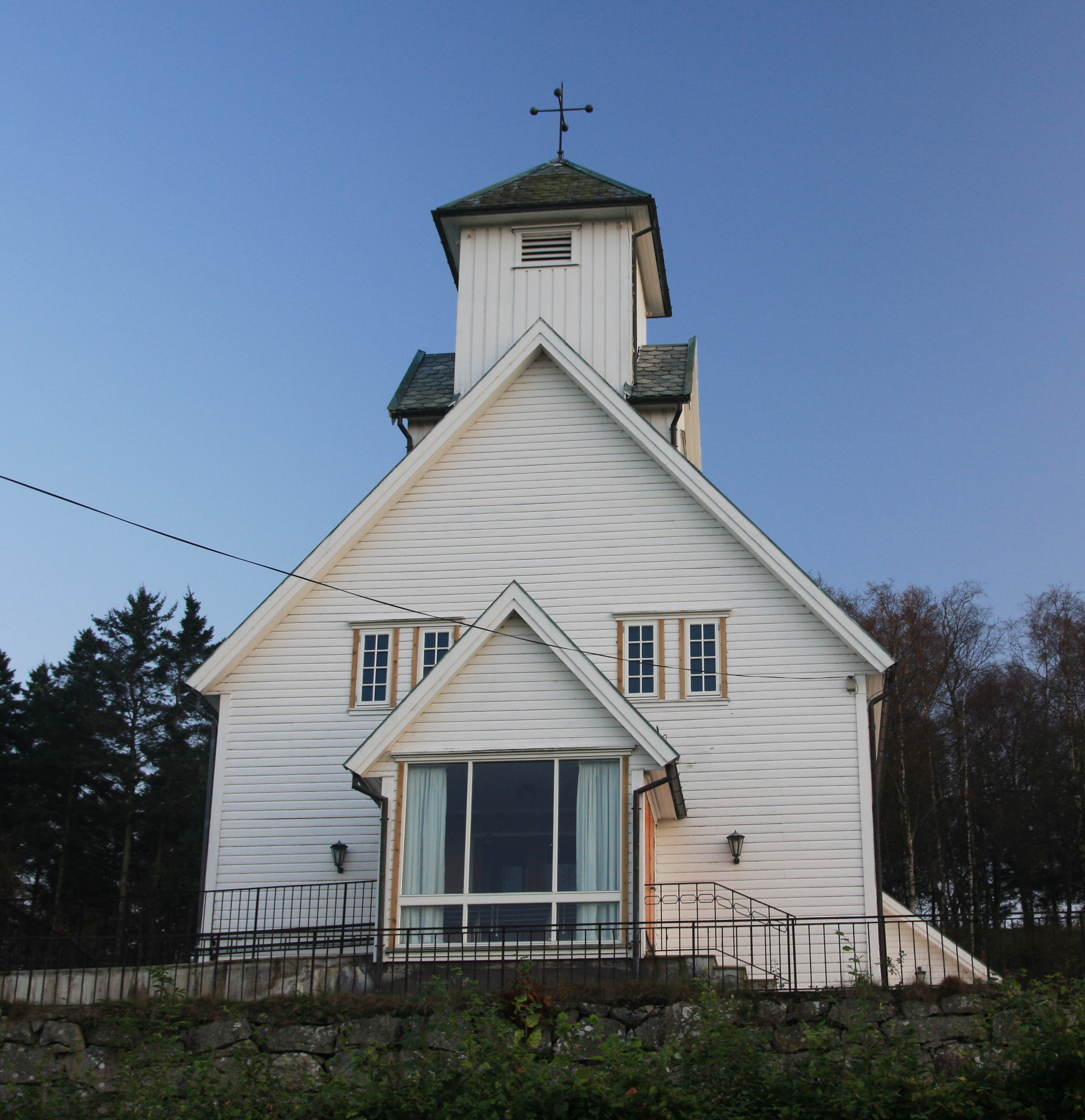

== See also ==
- List of churches in Rogaland
