= Sviland =

Borough in Sandnes, Norway

Bydel Sviland
- Borough
- Coat of arms

- Location within Sandnes Municipality
- Interactive map of Bydel Sviland
- Coordinates: 58°50′N 05°50′E
- Country: Norway
- Region: Western Norway
- County: Rogaland
- District: Jæren
- City: Sandnes

Area
  - Total: 68.6 km^{2} (26.5 sq mi)
- Elevation: 52 m (171 ft)

Population (2020)
  - Total: 1,332
  - Density: 19.4/km^{2} (50.3/sq mi)
- Time zone: UTC+01:00 (CET)
  - Summer (DST): UTC+02:00 (CEST)
- Post Code: 4308 Sandnes

Sviland is a borough in the southwestern part of the large Sandnes Municipality in Rogaland county, Norway. It is located in the rural part of the municipality, southeast of the city of Sandnes. With a population (2020) of only 1,332, the borough is one of the least populous of all the boroughs in Sandnes. On the other hand, Sviland borough is 68.6 square kilometres (26.5 sq mi), making it the second largest borough by area. Sviland Chapel is located in the borough.

The borough is home of the legendary Norwegian race horse Rex Rodney, winner of the 1986 Elitloppet.
