= Høyland Church =

Church in Rogaland, Norway

- Høyland kirke
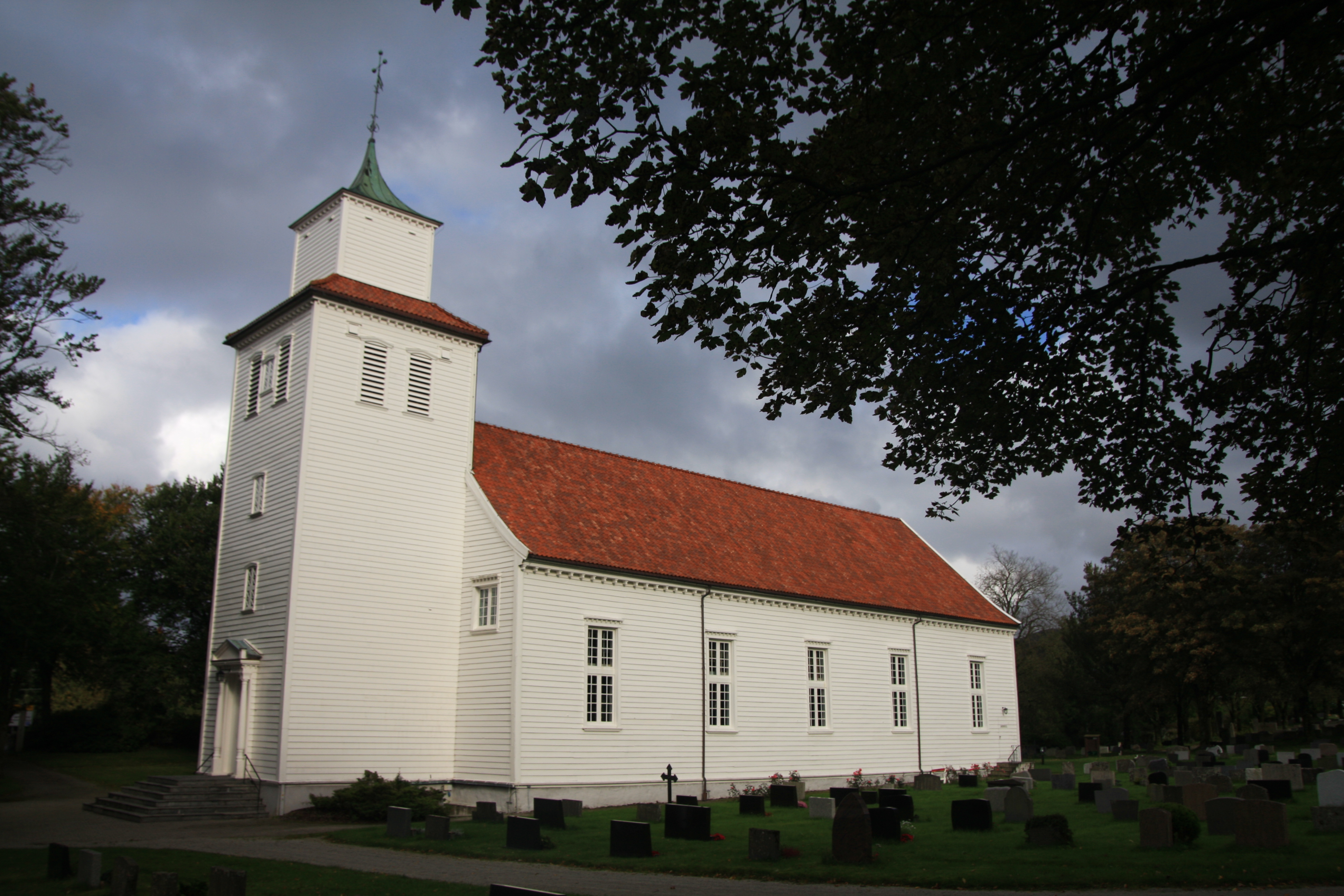
- View of the church
- Høyland Church
- 58.830897°N 5.750668°E
- Location: Sandnes, Rogaland
- Country: Norway
- Denomination: Church of Norway
- Churchmanship: Evangelical Lutheran

History
- Status: Parish church
- Consecrated: 22 Aug 1841

Architecture
- Functional status: Active
- Architect: Hans Linstow
- Architectural type: Long church
- Style: Empire style
- Completed: 1841

Specifications
- Capacity: 650
- Materials: Wood

Administration
- Diocese: Stavanger bispedømme
- Deanery: Sandnes prosti
- Parish: Høyland
- Norwegian Cultural Heritage Site
- Type: Church
- Status: Automatically protected
- ID: 84704

Høyland Church (Norwegian: Høyland kirke) is a parish church of the Church of Norway in the large Sandnes Municipality in Rogaland county, Norway. It is located in the borough of Austrått in the city of Sandnes in the far western part of the municipality. It is one of the two churches for the Høyland parish which is part of the Sandnes prosti (deanery) in the Diocese of Stavanger. The white, wooden church was built in a long church design in 1841 using designs by the architect Hans Linstow. The church seats about 650 people.

== History ==
The earliest existing historical records of the church date back to the year 1298, but the church was not new that year. The church was originally called Gond Church and it may have been a stave church. The first church on the site was located on the northern side of the river Høylandsåna, about 250 metres (820 ft) east of the present church site. The old church was torn down in 1663 and a new timber-framed church was constructed in 1664. Many of the materials from the old church were reused in the construction of the new church.

In 1814, this church served as an election church (Norwegian: valgkirke). Together with more than 300 other parish churches across Norway, it was a polling station for elections to the 1814 Norwegian Constituent Assembly which wrote the Constitution of Norway. This was Norway's first national elections. Each church parish was a constituency that elected people called "electors" who later met together in each county to elect the representatives for the assembly that was to meet at Eidsvoll Manor later that year.

In 1841, a new church was constructed in the Empire style about 250 metres (820 ft) west of the old church, on the other side of the river. After that church was completed, the old church was torn down. The new church was consecrated on 22 August 1841. In the early 21st century, the church cemetery was extended to the west towards the old church site. The local river had to be re-routed to the northeast about 40 metres (130 ft) to accommodate the new graveyard space. The river now passes directly by the old church site.

== Media gallery ==
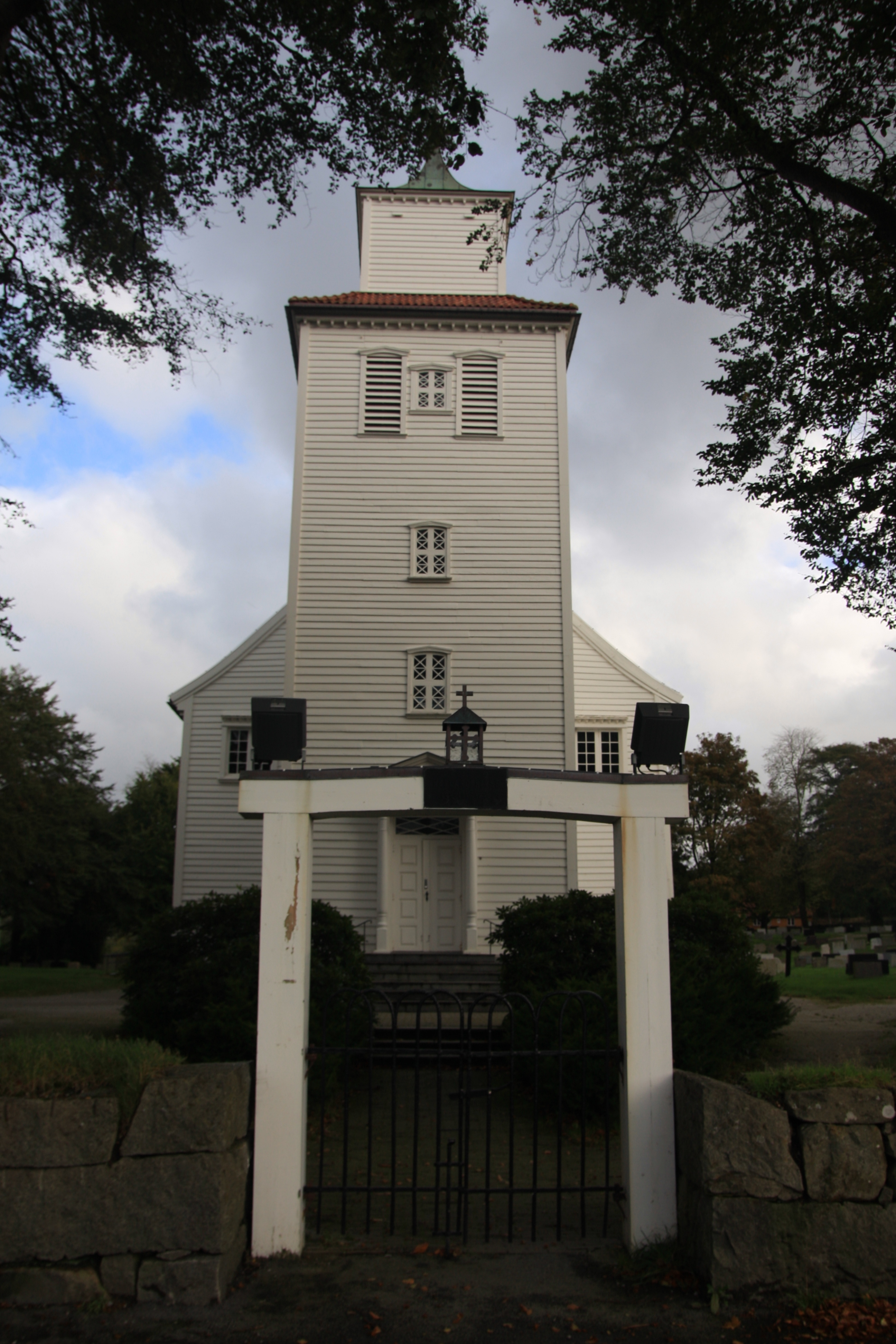

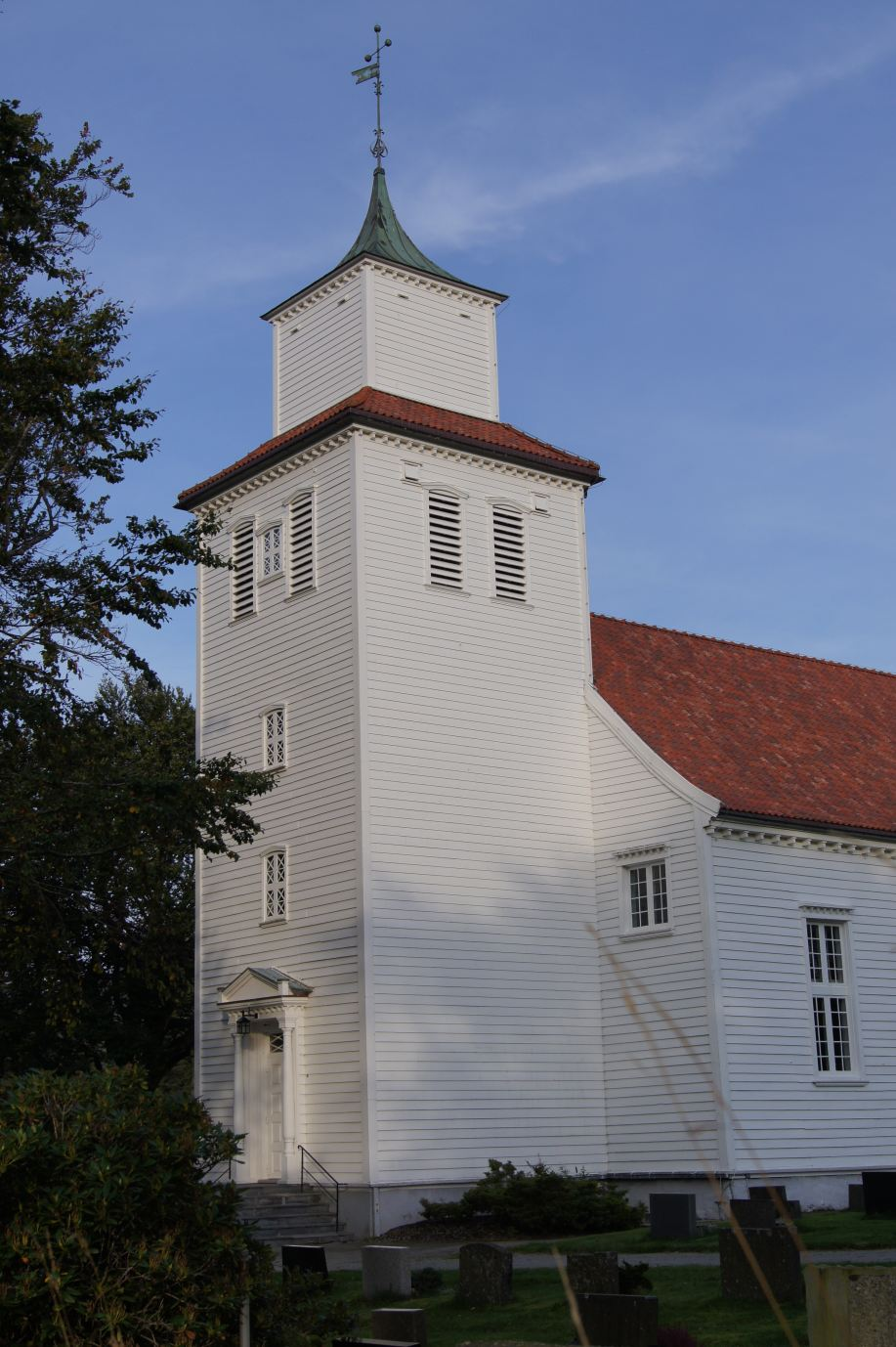

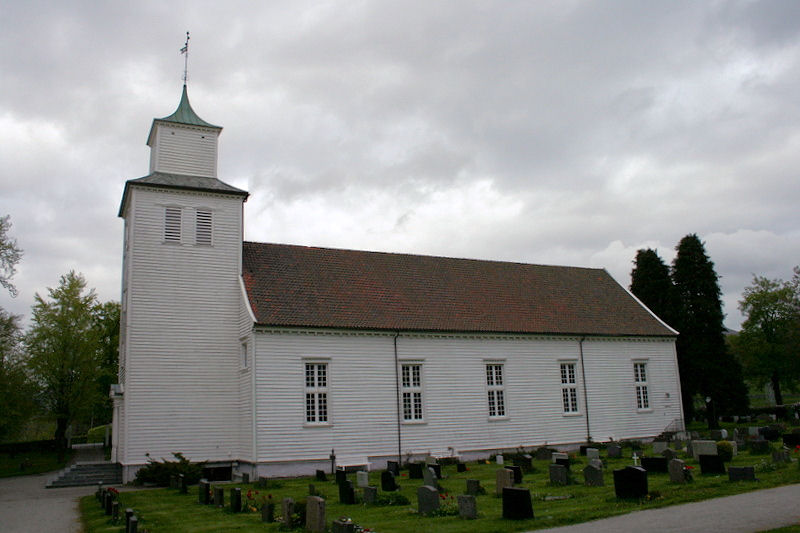

== See also ==
- List of churches in Rogaland
