= Trones og Sentrum =

Borough in Sandnes, Norway

Bydel Trones og Sentrum
- Borough
- Coat of arms

- Location within Sandnes Municipality
- Interactive map of Bydel Trones og Sentrum
- Coordinates: 58°51′08″N 05°44′17″E
- Country: Norway
- Region: Western Norway
- County: Rogaland
- District: Jæren
- City: Sandnes

Area
  - Total: 2.5 km^{2} (0.97 sq mi)

Population (2016)
  - Total: 8,250
  - Density: 3,300/km^{2} (8,500/sq mi)
- Time zone: UTC+01:00 (CET)
  - Summer (DST): UTC+02:00 (CEST)
- Post Code: 4307 Sandnes

Trones og Sentrum is a borough of the city of Sandnes in the west part of the large Sandnes Municipality in Rogaland county, Norway. It encompasses the downtown part of the city, at the inner end of the Gandsfjorden. In 2016, this borough had a population of 8,250 and is 2.5 km^{2} (0.97 sq mi) in size. Sandnes Church is located in this borough.
