= List of churches in Rogaland =

Map of the church deaneries (Norwegian: prostier) in the Diocese of Stavanger which covers all of Rogaland county.

This list of churches in Rogaland is a list of the Church of Norway churches in the Diocese of Stavanger in Norway. It includes all of the parishes in Rogaland county. The diocese is based at the Stavanger Cathedral in the city of Stavanger in Stavanger Municipality.

The list is divided into several sections, one for each deanery (prosti; headed by a provost) in the diocese. Administratively within each deanery, the churches within each municipality elects their own church council (fellesråd). Each municipality may have one or more parishes (sokn) within the municipality. Each parish elects their own councils (soknerådet). Each parish has one or more local church.

The municipality of Stavanger is a special case since it has a large population and a large area. The central part of the city is its own deanery and the areas surrounding the city centre belong to a different deanery, and the outlying island areas belong to another deanery. The number, size, and compositions of the deaneries in the diocese have changed over time, most recently in 2013 when two deaneries were merged to form the new Ryfylke deanery.

== Stavanger domprosti ==
This arch-deanery (Norwegian: domprosti) covers the central part of the city of Stavanger in Rogaland county. The deanery is headquartered at the Stavanger Cathedral in the city of Stavanger in the western part of Stavanger Municipality.

This deanery has been around since the Middle Ages. On 1 January 1925, the deanery was divided with the areas in the city centre of Stavanger (Domkirken, St. Petri, and St. Johannes) remaining in the Stavanger domprosti and the rest of the old deanery (Hetland, Høgsfjord, Strand, Finnøy, and Rennesøy) became part of the new Hetland prosti (later renamed Søre Ryfylke prosti) which included the central parts of the county.

Municipality	Parish (sokn)	Church	Location	Year built	Photo
Stavanger	Stavanger domkirke og St. Petri	Stavanger Cathedral	Stavanger	1150	
Stavanger	Stavanger domkirke og St. Petri	St. Petri Church	Stavanger	1866	
Stavanger	Bekkefaret	Bekkefaret Church	Bekkefaret	1977	
Stavanger	Hundvåg	Hundvåg Church	Hundvåg	1983	
Stavanger	Kampen	Kampen Church	Eiganes og Våland	1957	
Stavanger	St. Johannes	Frue Church (Hetland Church)	Stavanger	1854	
Stavanger	St. Johannes	St. Johannes Church	Stavanger	1909	
Stavanger	Stokka	Stokka Church	Stokka	1974	
Stavanger	Tjensvoll	Tjensvoll Church	Tjensvoll	1978	
Stavanger	Varden	Varden Church	Varden	1967	

== Dalane prosti ==
This deanery (Norwegian: prosti) covers the southern part of Rogaland county, including the municipalities of Eigersund, Bjerkreim, Sokndal, and Lund. The deanery is headquartered in the town of Egersund in Eigersund Municipality.

The deanery was created in the Middle Ages, and its borders have changed very few times since then. On 1 January 1825, the Flekkefjord and Hitterø parishes were transferred out of Dalane prosti to the neighboring Lister prosti. In 1862, the Bakke and Sirdal parishes were transferred out of Dalane prosti and into the neighboring Flekkefjord prosti. In 1988, the Ogna parish was transferred to the neighboring Jæren prosti.

Municipality	Parish (sokn)	Church	Location	Year built	Photo
Bjerkreim	Bjerkreim	Bjerkreim Church	Bjerkreim	1835	
Bjerkreim	Bjerkreim	Ivesdal Chapel	Øvrebygd	1876	
Eigersund	Egersund	Egersund Church	Egersund	1607	
Eigersund	Egersund	Bakkebø Church	Egersund	1960	
Eigersund	Eigerøy	Eigerøy Church	Eigerøya	1998	
Eigersund	Helleland	Helleland Church	Helleland	1832	
Lund	Heskestad	Heskestad Church	Heskestad	1904	
Lund	Lund	Lund Church	Moi	1812	
Sokndal	Sokndal	Sokndal Church	Hauge	1803	
Sokndal	Sokndal	Åna-Sira Church	Åna-Sira	1888	

== Haugaland prosti ==
This deanery (Norwegian: prosti) covers the northwestern part of Rogaland county, including the municipalities of Haugesund, Bokn, Tysvær, Utsira, and Vindafjord. The deanery is headquartered in the town of Haugesund in Haugesund Municipality.

The deanery was historically called Karmsund prosti, a deanery dating back to the Middle Ages. It historically encompassed all of the areas surrounding the Karmsundet strait, west of Ryfylke. By 2006, the membership of the deanery had grown so large, it was divided into two: all of the parishes in Karmøy Municipality were moved to the new Karmøy prosti and the rest remained in the deanery which was renamed Haugesund prosti. In 2013, the parishes from Vindafjord Municipality were moved here, and the name was changed from Haugesund prosti to Haugaland prosti.

Municipality	Parish (sokn)	Church	Location	Year built	Photo
Bokn	Bokn	Bokn Church	Føresvik	1847	
Haugesund	Rossabø	Rossabø Church	Rossabø	1972	
Haugesund	Skåre	Skåre Church	Haugesund	1858	
Haugesund	Skåre	Udland Church	Haugesund	2002	
Haugesund	Vår Frelser	Vår Frelsers Church	Haugesund	1901	
Tysvær	Førresfjorden	Aksdal Church	Aksdal	1995	
Tysvær	Førresfjorden	Førre Church	Førre	1893	
Tysvær	Nedstrand	Nedstrand Church	Hindaråvåg	1868	
Tysvær	Nedstrand	Skjoldastraumen Church	Skjoldastraumen	1910	
Tysvær	Tysvær	Tysvær Church	Tysvær	1852	
Utsira	Utsira	Utsira Church	Utsira	1785	
Vindafjord	Imsland	Imsland Church	Imslandsjøen	1861	
Vindafjord	Sandeid	Sandeid Church	Sandeid	1904	
Vindafjord	Skjold	Skjold Church	Skjold	1999	
Vindafjord	Vats	Vats Church	Vats	1855	
Vindafjord	Vikebygd	Vikebygd Church	Vikebygd	1937	
Vindafjord	Vikedal	Vikedal Church	Vikedal	1881	
Vindafjord	Ølen og Bjoa	Ølen Church	Ølensjøen	1874	
Vindafjord	Ølen og Bjoa	Bjoa Church	Bjoa	1895	

== Jæren prosti ==
This deanery (Norwegian: prosti) covers the west-central part of Rogaland county, south of the city of Stavanger, including the municipalities of Gjesdal, Hå, Klepp, and Time. The deanery is headquartered in the town of Bryne in Time Municipality. There is one parish (sokn) in this deanery that crosses municipal boundary lines. The Frøyland og Orstad parish includes parts of both Time and Klepp municipalities. This is the only such parish in Norway.

The deanery of Jæderen has been around since the Middle Ages and it has always included the coastal areas south of the city of Stavanger. A royal resolution on 19 May 1922 changed the deanery name from "Jæderen prosti" to "Jæren prosti". In 1988, the parishes of Randaberg and Høle transferred from Ryfylke prosti to Jæren prosti and the Ogna parish was transferred from Dalane prosti to Jæren. On 1 May 1997, the parishes in Sola and Sandnes municipalities were separated from Jæren prosti to form the new Sandnes prosti.

Municipality	Parish (sokn)	Church	Location	Year built	Photo
Gjesdal	Gjesdal	Dirdal Church	Dirdal	1903	
Gjesdal	Gjesdal	Gjesdal Church	Gjesdal	1848	
Gjesdal	Gjesdal	Oltedal Church	Oltedal	2002	
Gjesdal	Ålgård	Ålgård Church	Ålgård	2015	
Gjesdal	Ålgård	Old Ålgård Church	Ålgård	1917	
Hå	Nærbø	Nærbø Church	Nærbø	2005	
Hå	Nærbø	Old Nærbø Church	Nærbø	1834	
Hå	Ogna	Ogna Church	Ogna	1995	
Hå	Varhaug	Varhaug Church	Varhaug	1904	
Klepp	Bore	Bore Church	Bore	1891	
Klepp	Klepp	Klepp Church	Kleppe	1846	
Klepp	Orre	Orre Church	Pollestad	1950	
Klepp	Orre	Old Orre Church	Orre	1250	
Klepp/Time	Frøyland og Orstad	Frøyland og Orstad Church	Orstad/Kvernaland	2008	
Time	Bryne	Bryne Church	Bryne	1979	
Time	Time	Time Church	Time (just outside Bryne)	1859	
Time	Undheim	Undheim Church	Undheim	2001	

== Karmøy prosti ==
This deanery (Norwegian: prosti) covers Karmøy Municipality which includes the island of Karmøy and a small area on the mainland of northwestern Rogaland county. The deanery is headquartered in the village of Avaldsnes in Karmøy Municipality.

The deanery was created on 1 January 2006 when it was split off from the old Karmsund prosti. The remainder of the old deanery was renamed Haugesund prosti.

Municipality	Parish (sokn)	Church	Location	Year built	Photo
Karmøy	Avaldsnes	Avaldsnes Church	Avaldsnes	1250	
Karmøy	Falnes	Falnes Church	Skudeneshavn	1851	
Karmøy	Ferkingstad	Ferkingstad Church	Ferkingstad	1854	
Karmøy	Kopervik	Kopervik Church	Kopervik	2016	
Karmøy	Norheim	Norheim Church	Norheim	1978	
Karmøy	Torvastad	Torvastad Church	Torvastad	1880	
Karmøy	Veavågen	Veavågen Church	Veavågen	2009	
Karmøy	Åkra	Åkra Church	Åkrahamn	1985	
Karmøy	Åkra	Old Åkra Church	Åkrahamn	1821	

== Ryfylke prosti ==
This deanery (Norwegian: prosti) covers the northeastern part of Rogaland county, including the municipalities of Sauda, Suldal, Hjelmeland, and Strand. The deanery is headquartered in the village of Hjelmelandsvågen in Hjelmeland Municipality.

Historically, there was a Ryfylke deanery since the Middle Ages. Over time, its boundaries were changed and moved. On 1 March 1988, the deanery was renamed Nordre Ryfylke prosti (and at the same time, the old Hetland prosti was renamed Søre Ryfylke prosti). Also on that date, the parishes in Hjelmeland Municipality were transferred from Nordre Ryfylke to Søre Ryfylke. In 2013, Nordre Ryfylke prosti and Søre Ryfylke prosti were merged to form the present Ryfylke prosti. In 2020, the parishes in the former Forsand Municipality were moved from here to the neighboring Sandnes prosti.

Municipality	Parish (sokn)	Church	Location	Year built	Photo
Hjelmeland	Fister	Fister Church	Fister	1867	
Hjelmeland	Hjelmeland	Hjelmeland Church	Hjelmelandsvågen	1858	
Hjelmeland	Årdal	Årdal Church	Årdal	1919	
Hjelmeland	Årdal	Old Årdal Church	Årdal	1619	
Sauda	Sauda	Sauda Church	Sauda	1866	
Sauda	Sauda	Solbrekk Chapel	Sauda	1958	
Sauda	Sauda	Hellandsbygd Chapel	Hellandsbygd	1956	
Sauda	Sauda	Saudasjøen Chapel	Saudasjøen	1973	
Strand	Jørpeland	Jørpeland Church	Jørpeland	1969	
Strand	Strand	Strand Church	Tau	1874	
Suldal	Erfjord	Erfjord Church	Hålandsosen	1877	
Suldal	Jelsa	Jelsa Church	Jelsa	1647	
Suldal	Sand	Sand Church	Sand	1853	
Suldal	Sand	Marvik Chapel	Marvik	1920	
Suldal	Suldal	Suldal Church	Suldalsosen	1852	
Suldal	Suldal	Nesflaten Chapel	Nesflaten	1853	

== Sandnes prosti ==
This deanery (Norwegian: prosti) covers Sandnes Municipality in the west-central part of Rogaland county. The deanery is headquartered in the town of Sandnes in Sandnes Municipality.

The deanery was created in 1998 when the parishes in Sola and Sandnes municipalities were removed from the large Jæren prosti. In 2006, the parishes in Sola municipality were transferred to the neighboring Tungenes prosti, leaving just the parishes in Sandnes municipality in this deanery. In 2020, the parishes in the former Forsand Municipality were moved from Ryfylke prosti to this one.

Municipality	Parish (sokn)	Church	Location	Year built	Photo
Sandnes	Bogafjell	Bogafjell Church	Bogafjell	2012	
Sandnes	Forsand	Forsand Church	Forsand	1854	
Sandnes	Forsand	Lyse Chapel	Lysebotn	1961	
Sandnes	Gand	Gand Church	Sandved	1978	
Sandnes	Gand	Julebygda Chapel	Malmheim og Soma	1957	
Sandnes	Hana	Hana Church	Hana	1997	
Sandnes	Høle	Høle Church	Høle	1860	
Sandnes	Høyland	Høyland Church	Austrått	1841	
Sandnes	Høyland	Sviland Church	Sviland	1913	
Sandnes	Lura	Lura Church	Lura	1987	
Sandnes	Riska	Riska Church	Hommersåk	1999	
Sandnes	Riska	Old Riska Church	Hommersåk	1877	
Sandnes	Sandnes	Sandnes Church	Sandnes sentrum	1882	

== Tungenes prosti ==
This deanery (Norwegian: prosti) covers the central part of Rogaland county, in the area around the Boknafjorden. It includes the municipalities of Randaberg, Kvitsøy, and Sola, plus the eastern island portion of Stavanger Municipality. The deanery is headquartered in the village of Randaberg in Randaberg Municipality.

The deanery was created in 1998 when the parishes in Randaberg and Kvitsøy were removed from the large Jæren prosti along with six parishes from the Stavanger domprosti (Madlamark, Hafrsfjord, Sunde, Tasta, Vardeneset, and Tjensvoll). In 2006, several other changes took place: the parish of Tjensvoll was moved to the new Ytre Stavanger prosti, all of the parishes in Sola were moved to this deanery from Sandnes prosti, and all of the parishes in Rennesøy and Finnøy were moved to this deanery from Søre Ryfylke prosti.

Municipality	Parish (sokn)	Church	Location	Year built	Photo
Kvitsøy	Kvitsøy	Kvitsøy Church	Kvitsøy	1620	
Randaberg	Grødem	Grødem Church	Grødem	2000	
Randaberg	Randaberg	Randaberg Church	Randaberg	1845	
Sola	Ræge	Ræge Church	north of Stenebyen	2009	
Sola	Sola	Sola Church	Solakrossen	2020	
Sola	Sola	Sola Chapel	Solakrossen	1955	
Sola	Sørnes	Sørnes Church	Sørnes	1977	
Sola	Tananger	Tananger Church	Tananger	2002	
Sola	Tananger	Tananger Chapel	Tananger	1879	
Stavanger	Hesby	Hesby Church	Finnøy	c. 1100	
Stavanger	Mosterøy	Askje Church	Askje	1846	
Stavanger	Mosterøy	Austre Åmøy Chapel	Austre Åmøy	1904	
Stavanger	Mosterøy	Utstein Church	Klosterøy	1280	
Stavanger	Mosterøy	Vestre Åmøy Chapel	Western Åmøy	1953	
Stavanger	Rennesøy	Hausken Church	Vikevåg	1857	
Stavanger	Rennesøy	Sørbø Church	Sørbø	1130	
Stavanger	Sjernarøy	Sjernarøy Church	Kyrkjøy in Sjernarøyane	1647	
Stavanger	Sjernarøy	Jørstad Church	Jørstadvågen on Ombo	1929	
Stavanger	Talgje	Fogn Church	Fogn	1991	
Stavanger	Talgje	Talgje Church	Talgje	c. 1100	

== Ytre Stavanger prosti ==
This deanery (Norwegian: prosti) covers the outer parts of the city of Stavanger in western Stavanger Municipality in Rogaland county. The deanery is headquartered in Madlamark in the western part of the city of Stavanger.

This deanery was created on 1 January 2006 when five parishes from Tungenes prosti (Madlamark, Hafrsfjord, Sunde, Tasta, and Vardeneset) and three parishes from the Stavanger domprosti (Hinna, Hillevåg, and Gausel) were combined to form a new deanery that surrounds the city centre of Stavanger.

Municipality	Parish (sokn)	Church	Location	Year built	Photo
Stavanger	Gausel	Gausel Church	Gausel	1996	
Stavanger	Hafrsfjord	Revheim Church	Sør-Sunde	1865	
Stavanger	Hillevåg	Hillevåg Church	Hillevåg	1961	
Stavanger	Hinna	Hinna Church	Hinna	1967	
Stavanger	Madlamark	Madlamark Church	Madlamark	1976	
Stavanger	Sunde	Sunde Church	Sunde	1984	
Stavanger	Tasta	Tasta Church	Indre Tasta	1977	
Stavanger	Vardeneset	Vardeneset Church	Ytre Tasta	2000	
