= Sandnes Church =

Sandnes Church may refer to:

- Sandnes Church (Agder), a church in Bygland municipality in Agder county, Norway
- Sandnes Church (Rogaland), a church in the city of Sandnes in Rogaland county, Norway
- Sandnes Church (Vestland), a church in Masfjorden municipality in Vestland county, Norway
