= Varhaug Church =

Church in Rogaland, Norway

- Varhaug kirke
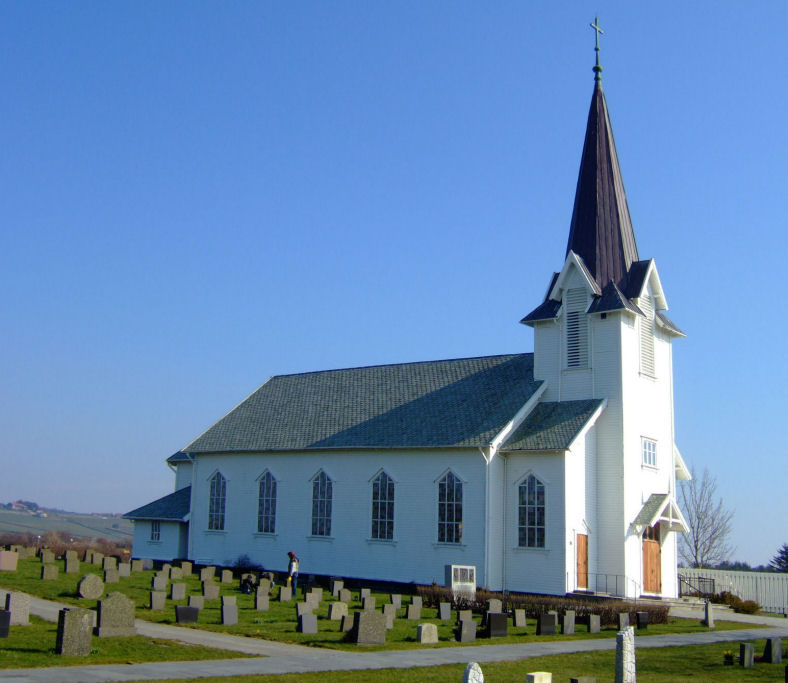
- View of the church
- Varhaug Church
- 58.597722°N 05.662185°E
- Location: Hå Municipality, Rogaland
- Country: Norway
- Denomination: Church of Norway
- Churchmanship: Evangelical Lutheran

History
- Status: Parish church
- Founded: 13th century
- Consecrated: 7 Dec 1904

Architecture
- Functional status: Active
- Architect: Hartvig Sverdrup Eckhoff
- Architectural type: Long church
- Completed: 1904 (122 years ago)

Specifications
- Capacity: 465
- Materials: Wood

Administration
- Diocese: Stavanger bispedømme
- Deanery: Jæren prosti
- Parish: Varhaug
- Norwegian Cultural Heritage Site
- Type: Church
- Status: Listed
- ID: 85772

Varhaug Church (Norwegian: Varhaug kirke) is a parish church of the Church of Norway in Hå Municipality in Rogaland county, Norway. It is located just south of the village of Varhaug on the Odland farm. It is the church for the Varhaug parish which is part of the Jæren prosti (deanery) in the Diocese of Stavanger. The white, wooden church was built in a long church style in 1904 using designs by the architect Hartvig Sverdrup Eckhoff. The church seats about 465 people.

== History ==
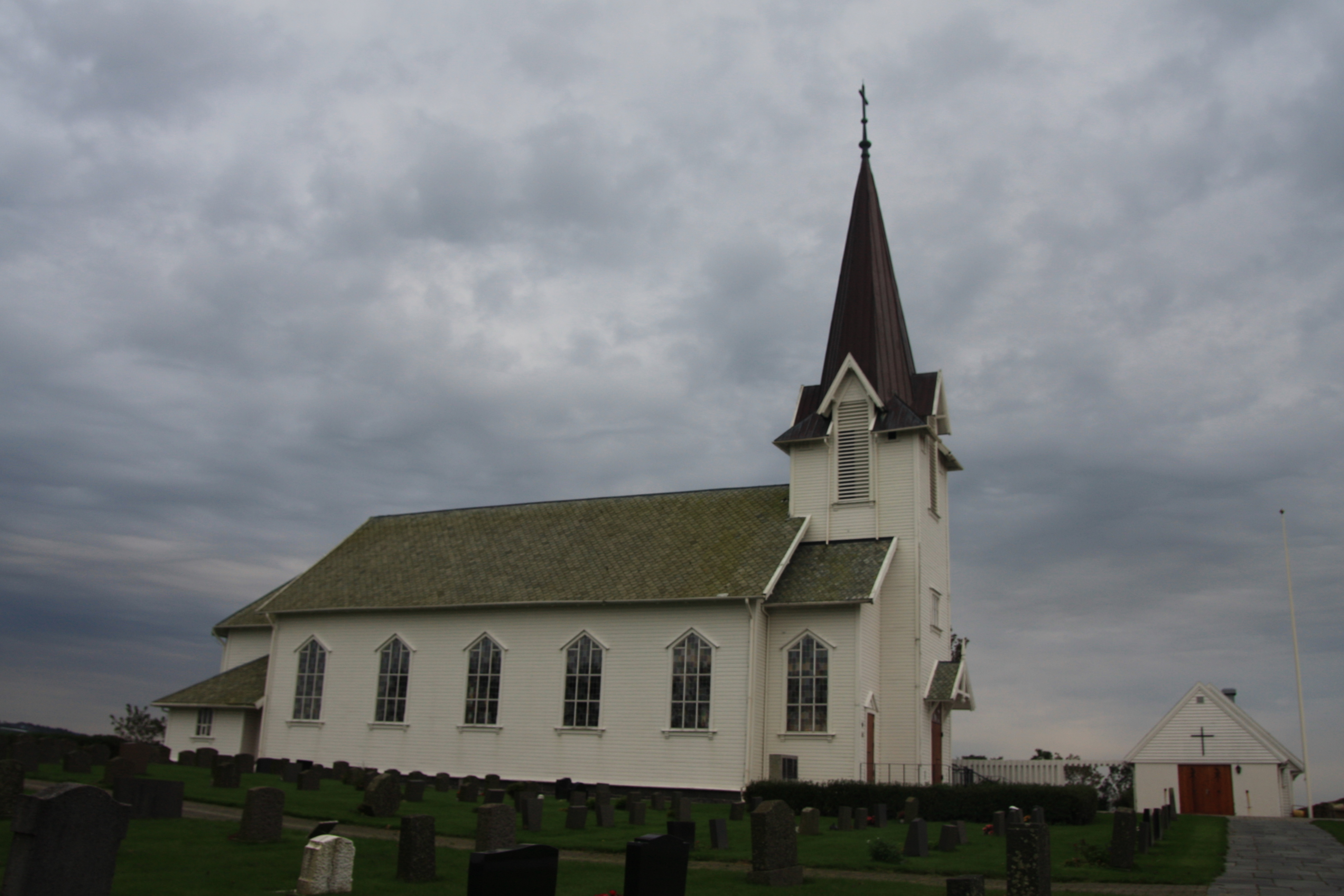
View of the church

The earliest existing historical records of the church date back to the year 1328, but it was not new that year. The original church site was along the shore, about 250 metres (820 ft) inland from the coast, just west of the village of Varhaug, about 3 kilometres (1.9 mi) from the present site of the church. In 1627, the old stave church was torn down and replaced with a new building on the same site.

In 1828, the church was torn down again and rebuilt, reusing many of the same materials from the old building. In 1904, a new Varhaug Church was built about 3 kilometres (1.9 mi) to the southeast of the old church. The new building was consecrated on 7 December 1904 and then the old church was torn down the following spring in 1905.

== See also ==
- List of churches in Rogaland
