= Kopervik Church =

Church in Rogaland, Norway

- Kopervik kirke
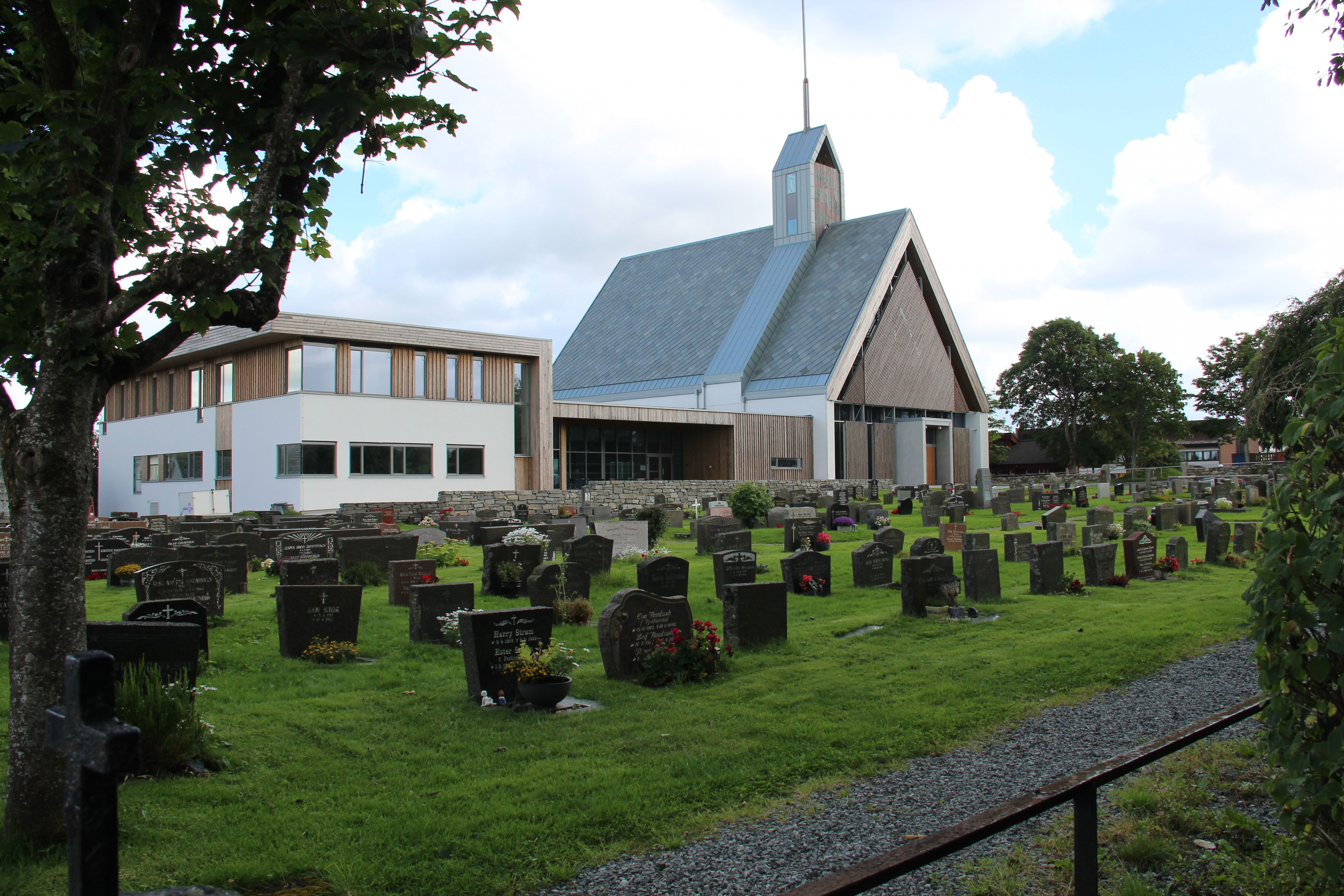
- View of the church
- Kopervik Church
- 59.28187°N 5.304615°E
- Location: Karmøy Municipality, Rogaland
- Country: Norway
- Denomination: Church of Norway
- Churchmanship: Evangelical Lutheran

History
- Status: Parish church
- Founded: 1861
- Consecrated: 23 April 2017
- Events: Fire (2010)

Architecture
- Functional status: Active
- Architect(s): Arkitektgruppen; Lille Frøen AS
- Architectural type: Rectangular
- Completed: 2017

Specifications
- Capacity: 600
- Materials: Concrete and glass

Administration
- Diocese: Stavanger bispedømme
- Deanery: Karmøy prosti
- Parish: Kopervik
- Norwegian Cultural Heritage Site
- Type: Church
- Status: Not protected
- ID: 84817

Kopervik Church (Norwegian: Kopervik kirke) is a parish church of the Church of Norway in Karmøy Municipality in Rogaland county, Norway. It is located in the town of Kopervik on the eastern shore of the island of Karmøy. It is the church for the Kopervik parish which is part of the Karmøy prosti (deanery) in the Diocese of Stavanger. The glass and concrete church was built in a rectangular design in 2017 using designs by the architectural firm: Arkitektgruppen Lille Frøen AS. The church seats about 600 people.

== History ==
The people of the Kopervik area historically went to church at Avaldsnes Church, but as the area gained population, a desire for a church in Kopervik grew. In 1855, the community received permission to build a church. The original Kopervik Church was built in 1861 by the architect Jacob Wilhelm Nordan. That church was consecrated on 2 October 1861. The church was built in a cruciform design built in an Italian renaissance style. It seated about 350 people and it was situated in a prominent place in the town of Kopervik, clearly visible from the sea. The wooden church burned down on 28 May 2010 during an accident during a renovation that was in preparation for the building's 150-year anniversary (to be held in 2011).

Shortly after the fire, planning began to replace the church. The new church was completed in 2017. The new church was consecrated on 23 April 2017 by the Bishop Ivar Braut. The new, modern church has three sections: the main sanctuary, an office area, and a church hall.

== Media gallery ==
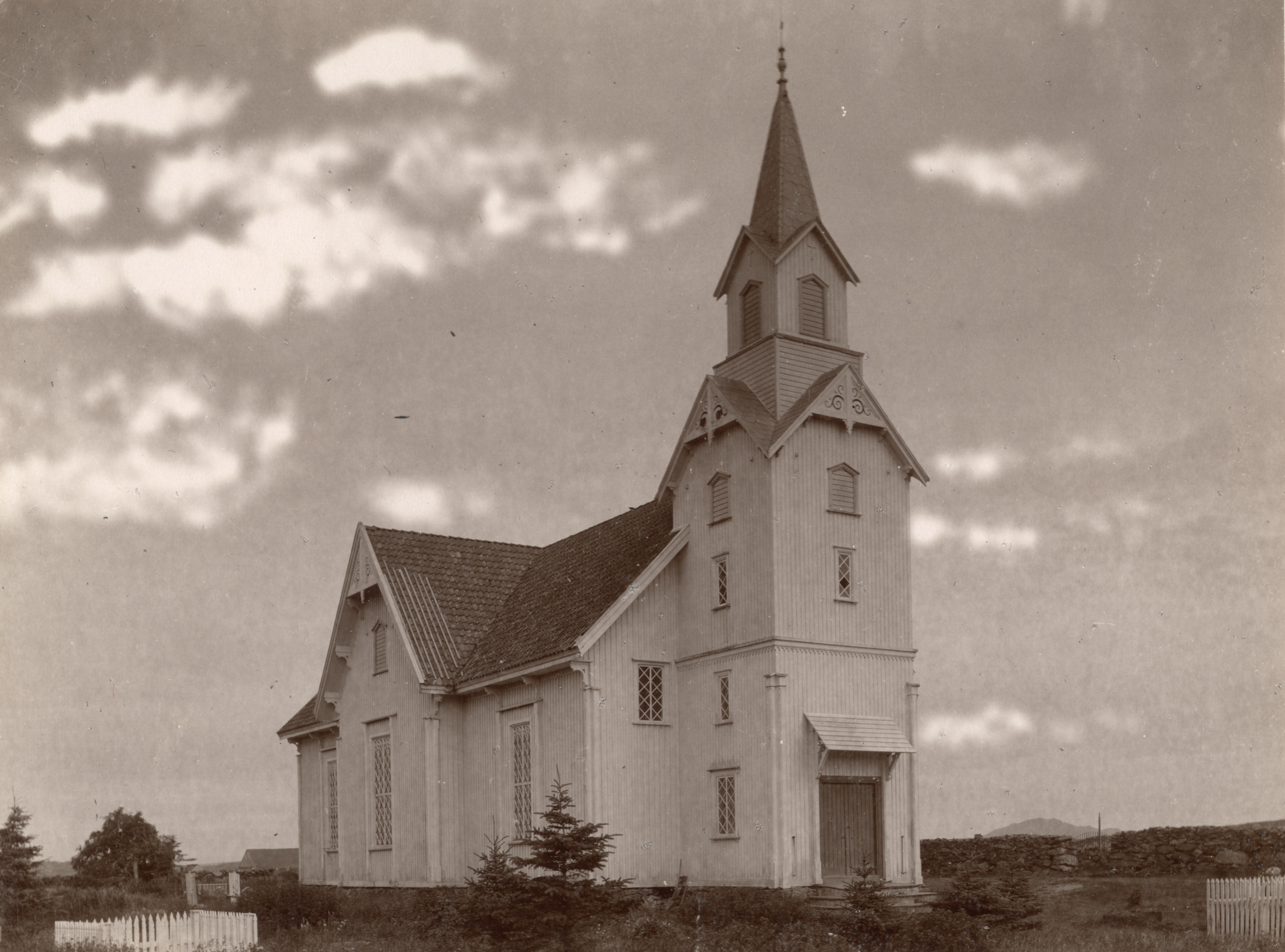
View of the old church

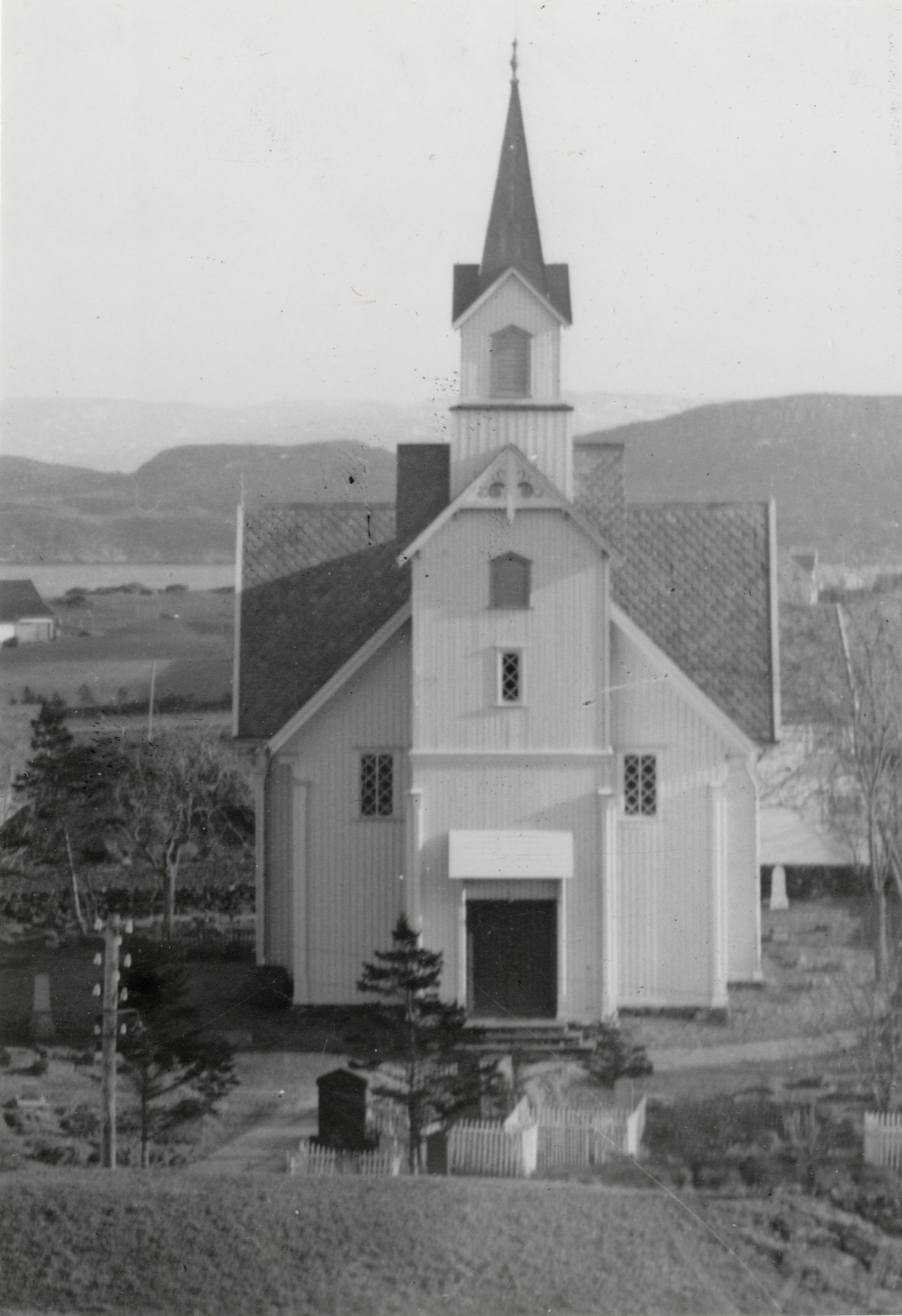
View of the old church

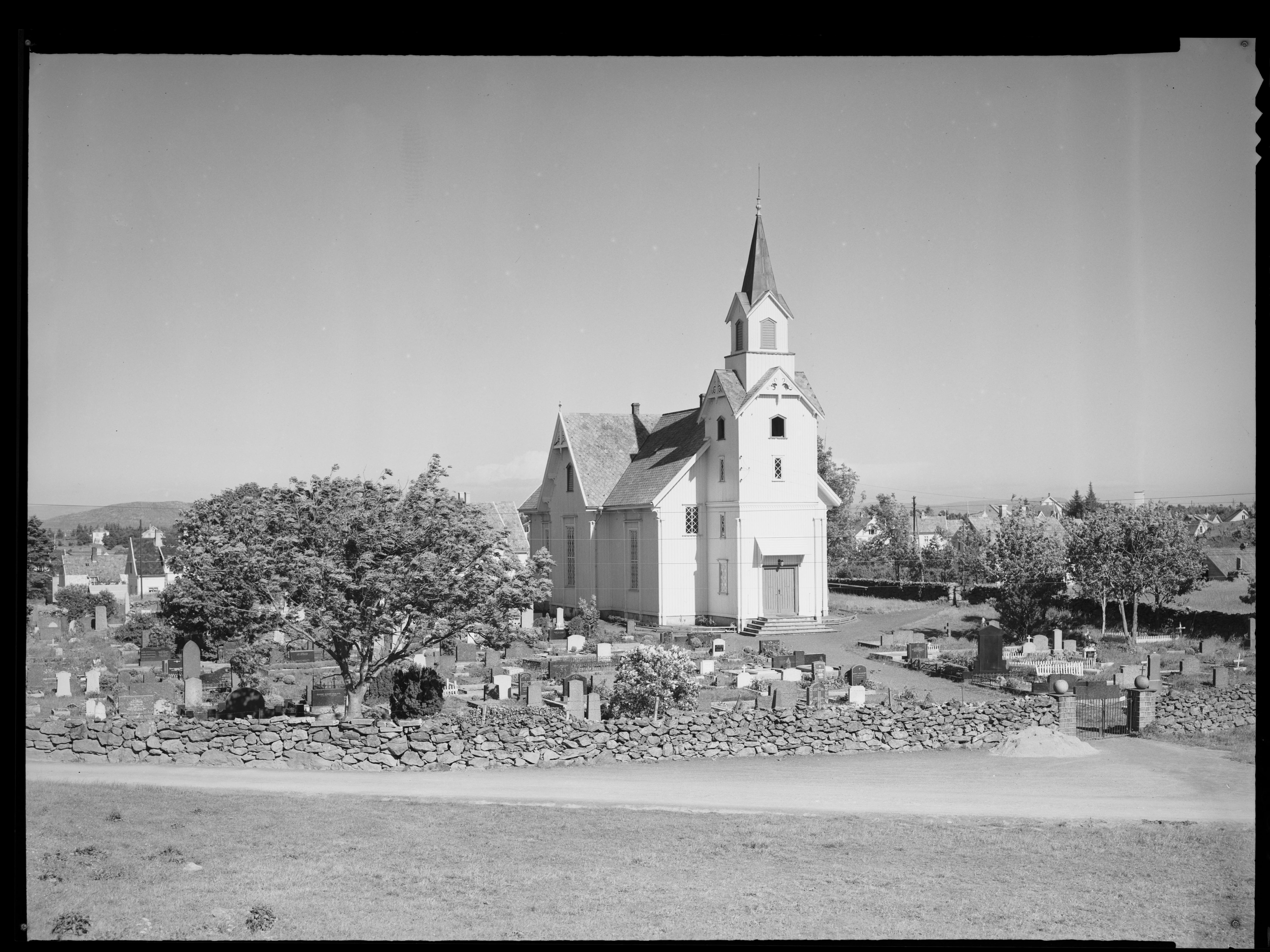
View of the old church

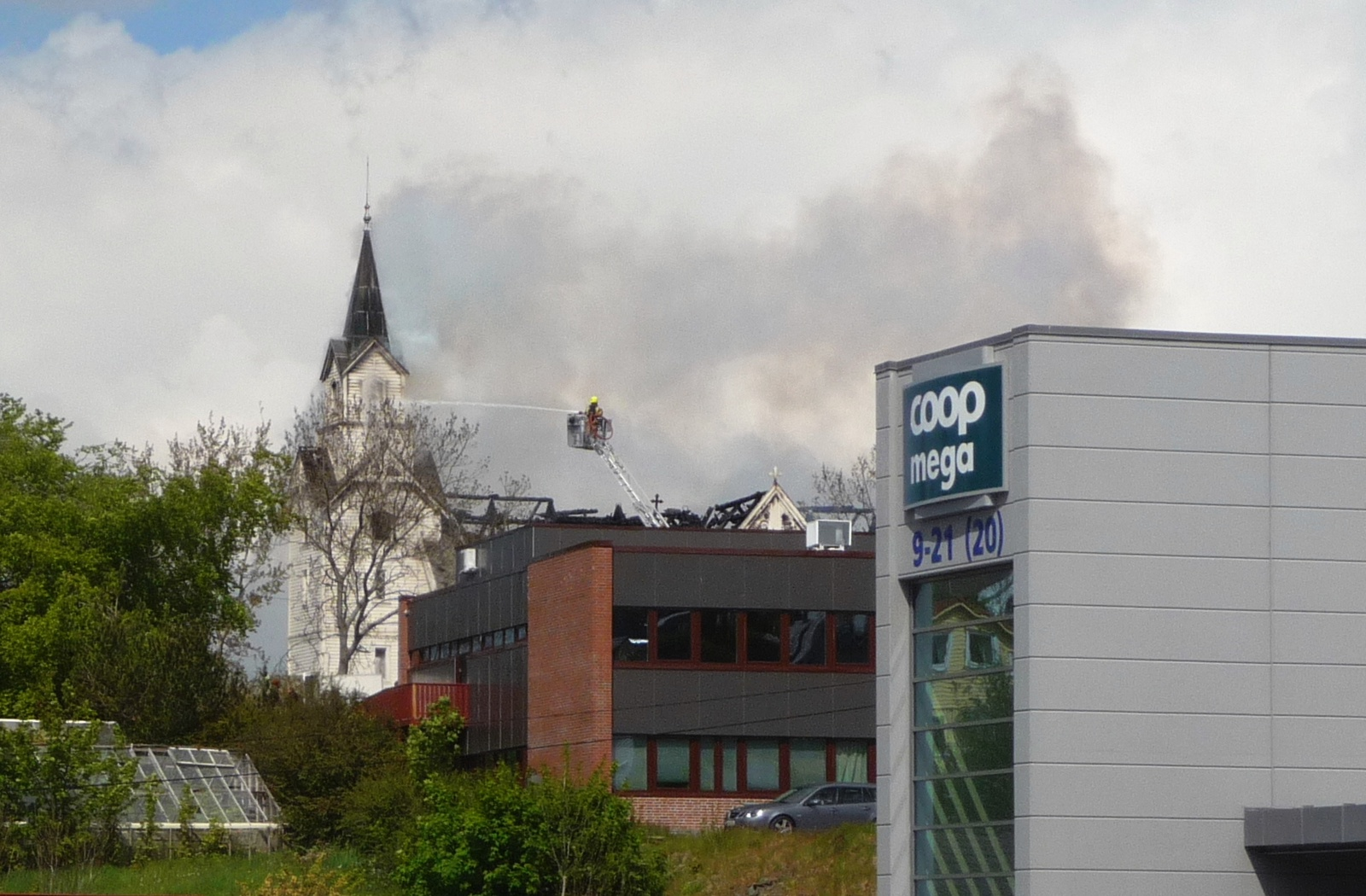
Efforts to put out the fire in May 2010

== See also ==
- List of churches in Rogaland
