= Falnes Church =

Church in Rogaland, Norway

- Falnes kirke
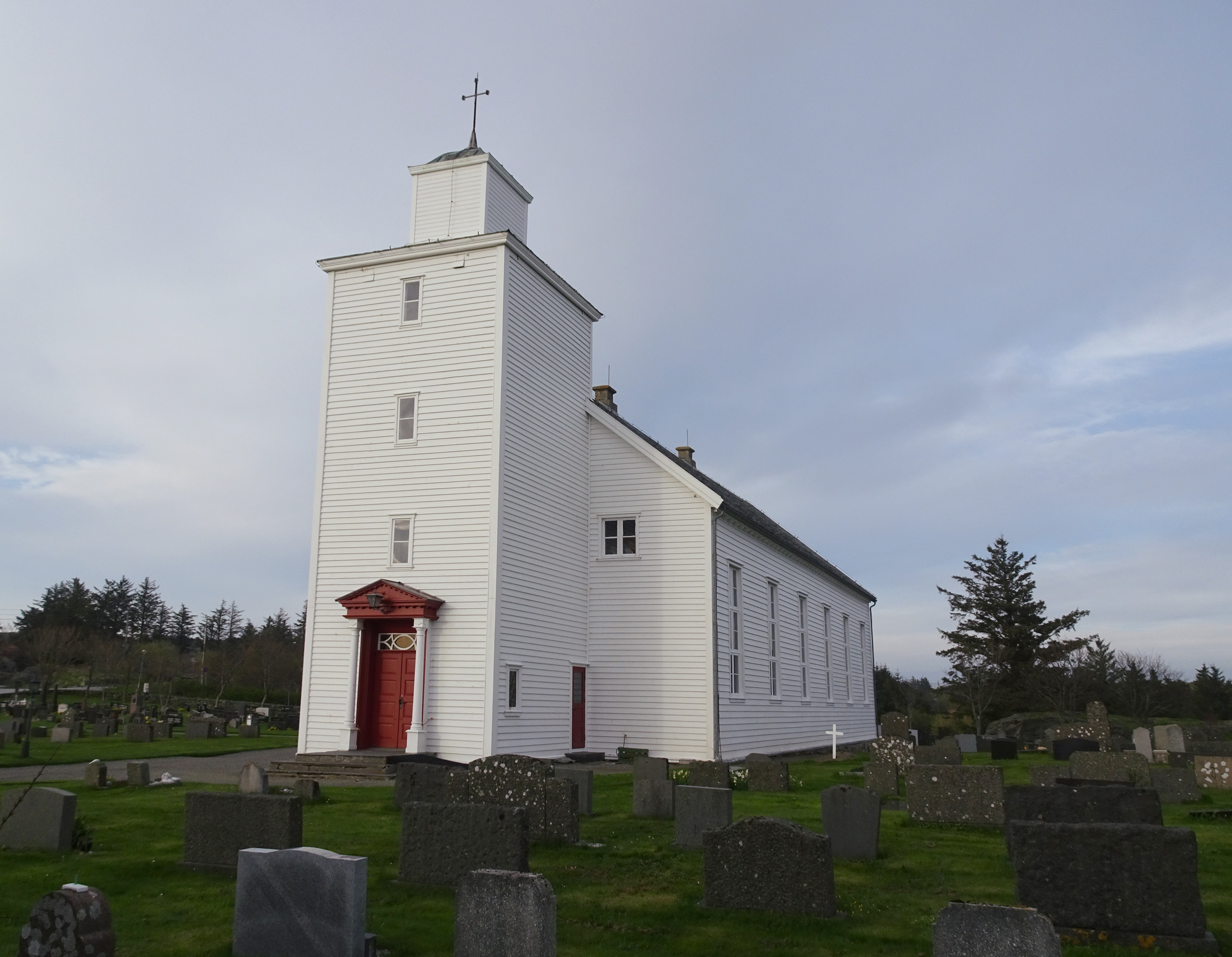
- View of the church
- Falnes Church
- 59.151207°N 5.28124°E
- Location: Karmøy Municipality, Rogaland
- Country: Norway
- Denomination: Church of Norway
- Churchmanship: Evangelical Lutheran

History
- Status: Parish church
- Founded: Middle Ages
- Consecrated: 1 Oct 1851

Architecture
- Functional status: Active
- Architect: Hans Linstow
- Architectural type: Long church
- Completed: 1851 (175 years ago)

Specifications
- Capacity: 600
- Materials: Wood

Administration
- Diocese: Stavanger bispedømme
- Deanery: Karmøy prosti
- Parish: Falnes
- Norwegian Cultural Heritage Site
- Type: Church
- Status: Protected
- ID: 84113

Falnes Church (Norwegian: Falnes kirke) is a parish church of the Church of Norway in Karmøy Municipality in Rogaland county, Norway. It is located in the town of Skudeneshavn on the southern tip of the island of Karmøy. It is the church for the Falnes parish which is part of the Karmøy prosti (deanery) in the Diocese of Stavanger. The white, wooden church was built in a long church design in 1851 using designs by the architect Hans Linstow. The church seats about 600 people.

== History ==
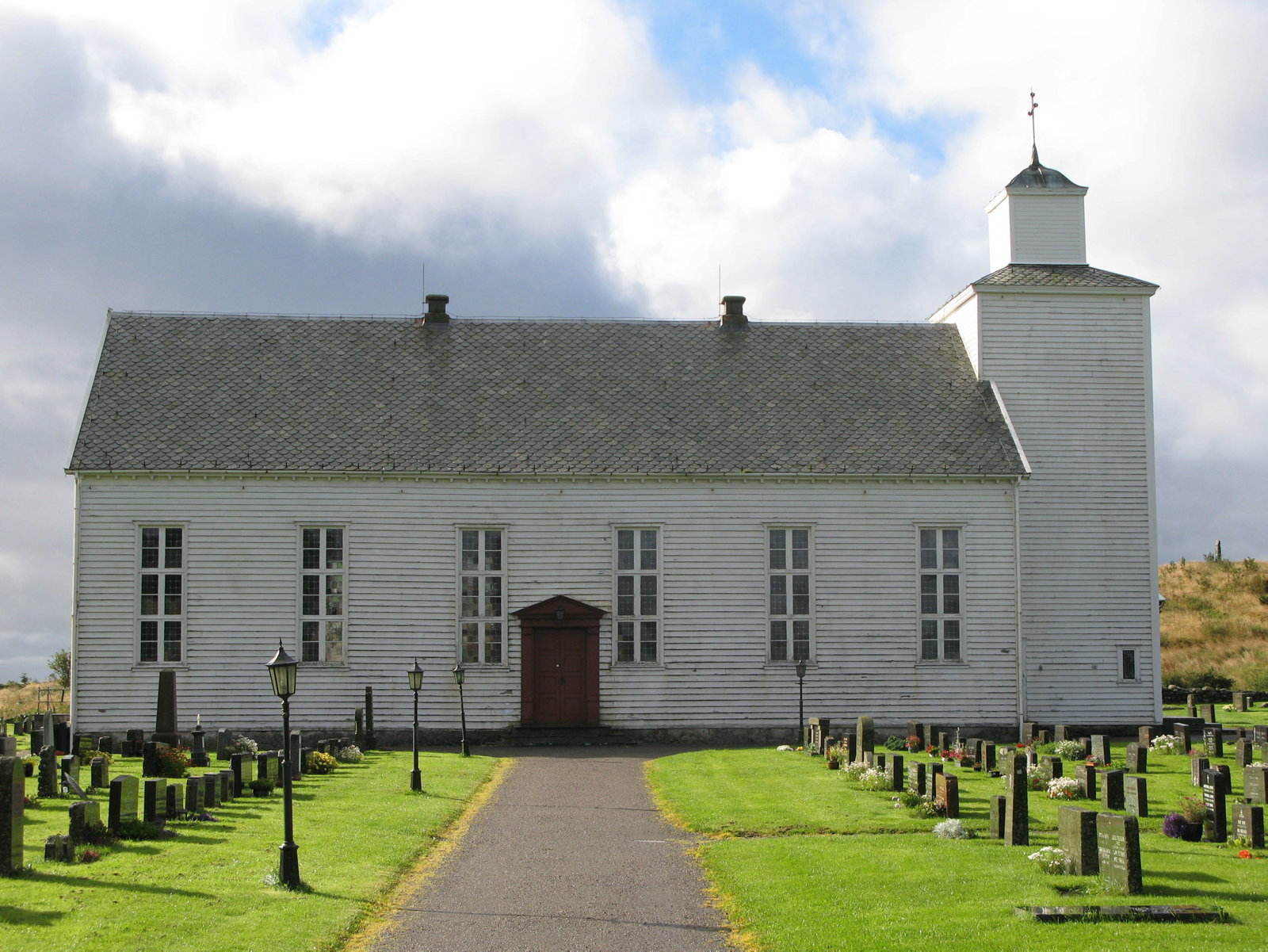
Side view of the church

The earliest existing historical records of the church date back to the year 1620, but it was likely built much earlier. The medieval church was probably a stave church and it was located about 650 metres (0.40 mi) east of the present site of the church. The old church was torn down in 1642, and over the next four years, a new church was constructed on the same site.

In 1814, this church served as an election church (Norwegian: valgkirke). Together with more than 300 other parish churches across Norway, it was a polling station for elections to the 1814 Norwegian Constituent Assembly which wrote the Constitution of Norway. This was Norway's first national elections. Each church parish was a constituency that elected people called "electors" who later met together in each county to elect the representatives for the assembly that was to meet at Eidsvoll Manor later that year.

In 1851, a new church was constructed about 650 metres (0.40 mi) to the west so that it would be much closer to the growing village of Skudeneshavn. The new church was consecrated on 1 October 1851. After the new church was completed, the old church was torn down and its materials were sold at auction.

== See also ==
- List of churches in Rogaland
