= Hillevåg Church =

Church in Rogaland, Norway

- Hillevåg kirke
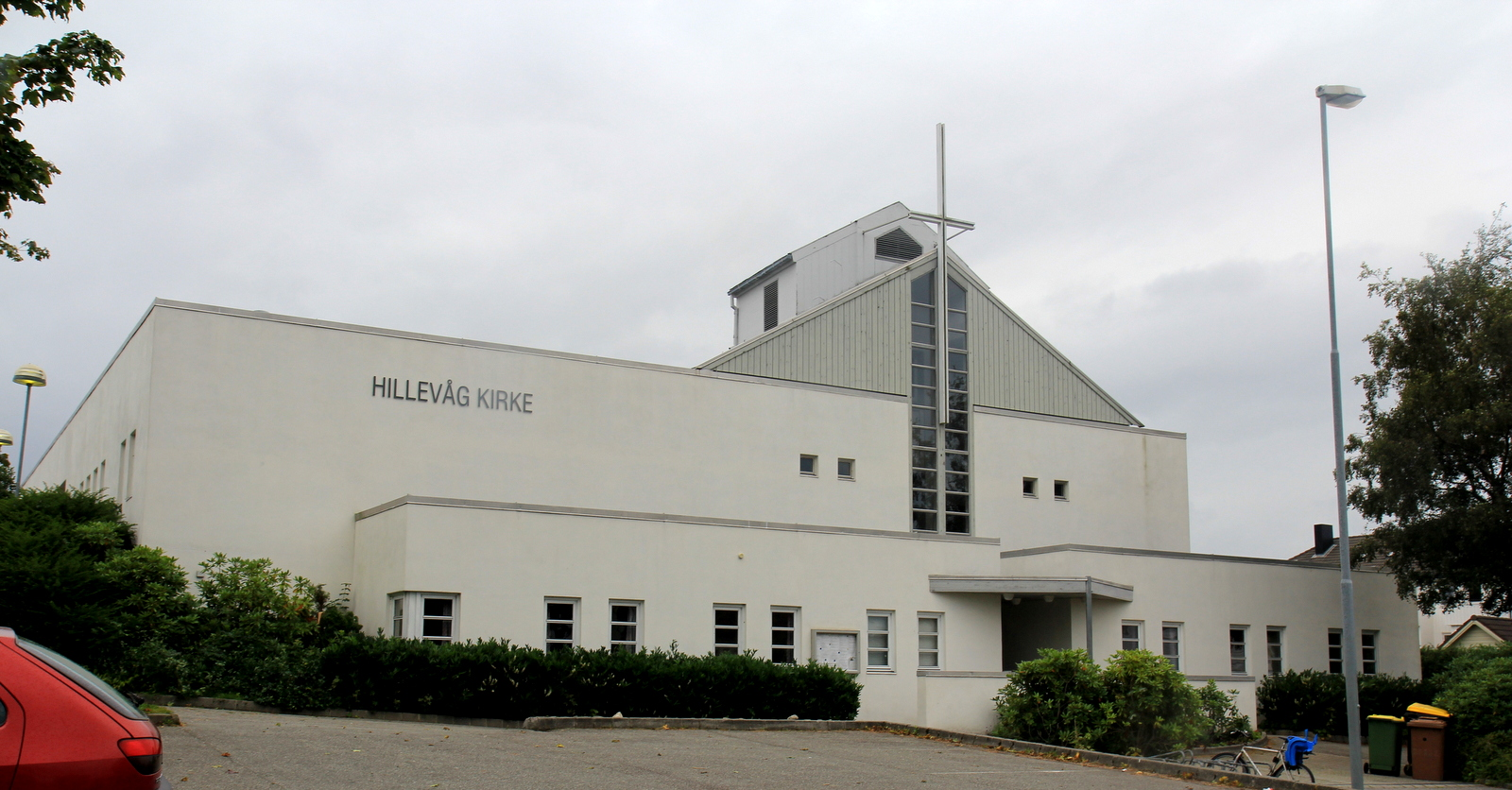
- Hillevåg Church
- 58.94416°N 5.740686°E
- Location: Stavanger Municipality, Rogaland
- Country: Norway
- Denomination: Church of Norway
- Churchmanship: Evangelical Lutheran

History
- Status: Parish church
- Founded: 1961
- Consecrated: 1961

Architecture
- Functional status: Active
- Architect(s): Valdemar Hansteen and Erik Thesen
- Architectural type: Rectangular
- Completed: 1961

Specifications
- Capacity: 370
- Materials: Concrete

Administration
- Diocese: Stavanger bispedømme
- Deanery: Ytre Stavanger prosti
- Parish: Hillevåg
- Norwegian Cultural Heritage Site
- Type: Church
- Status: Not protected
- ID: 84576

Hillevåg Church (Norwegian: Hillevåg kirke) is a parish church of the Church of Norway in the southern part of the large Stavanger Municipality in Rogaland county, Norway. It is located in the borough of Hillevåg in the central part of the city of Stavanger. It is the church for the Hillevåg parish which is part of the Ytre Stavanger prosti (deanery) in the Diocese of Stavanger. The white, concrete church was built in a rectangular design in 1961 using designs by the architects Valdemar Hansteen and Erik Thesen. The church seats about 370 people.

== See also ==
- List of churches in Rogaland
