= Hinna Church =

Church in Rogaland, Norway

- Hinna kirke
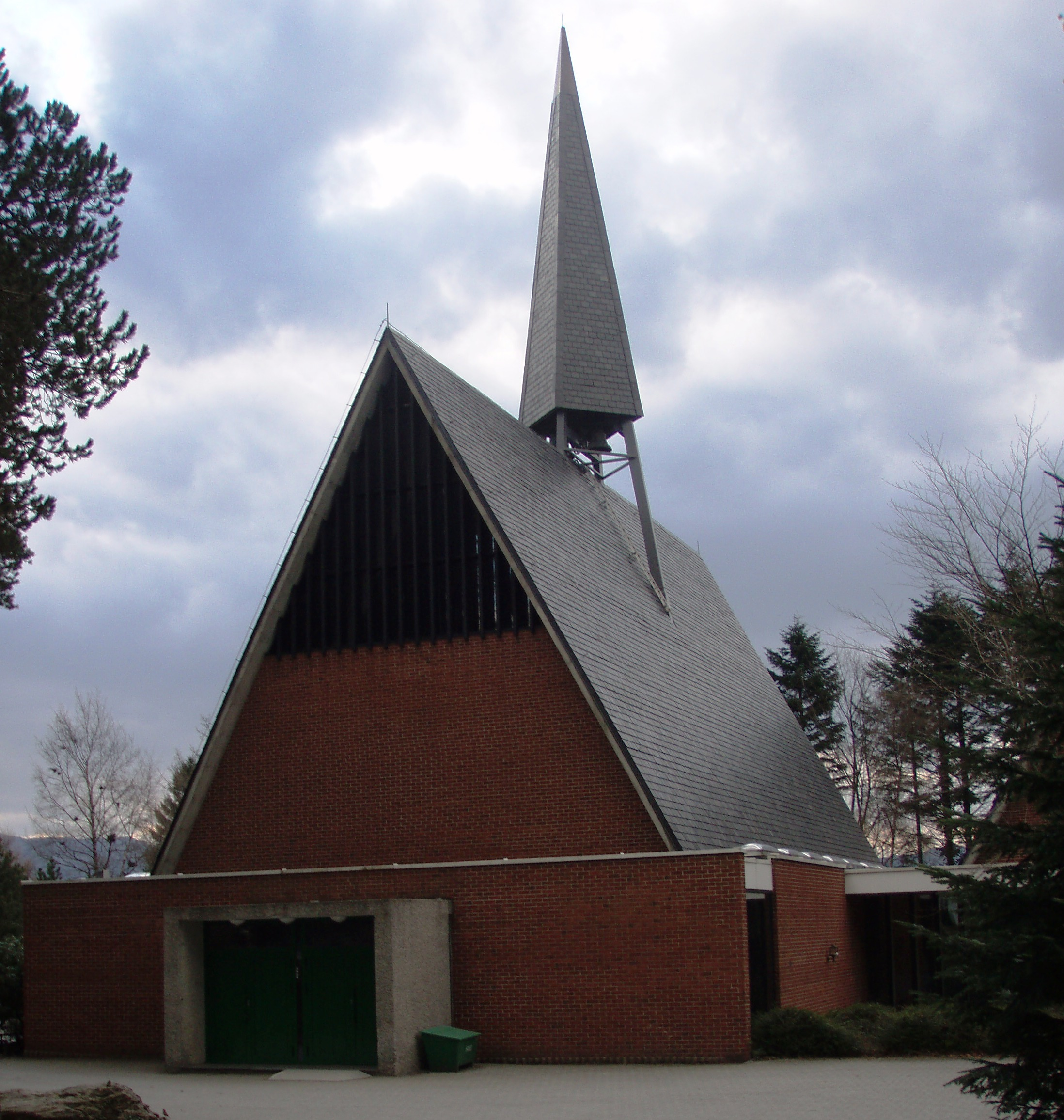
- View of the church
- Hinna Church
- 58.92382°N 5.72859°E
- Location: Stavanger Municipality, Rogaland
- Country: Norway
- Denomination: Church of Norway
- Churchmanship: Evangelical Lutheran

History
- Status: Parish church
- Founded: 1967
- Consecrated: 29 Oct 1967

Architecture
- Functional status: Active
- Architect(s): Eyvind Retzius and Svein Bjoland
- Architectural type: Rectangular
- Completed: 1967

Specifications
- Capacity: 700
- Materials: Brick

Administration
- Diocese: Stavanger bispedømme
- Deanery: Ytre Stavanger prosti
- Parish: Hinna
- Norwegian Cultural Heritage Site
- Type: Church
- Status: Not protected
- ID: 84577

Hinna Church (Norwegian: Hinna kirke) is a parish church of the Church of Norway in the southern part of the large Stavanger Municipality in Rogaland county, Norway. It is located in the borough of Hinna in the southern part of the city of Stavanger. It is the church for the Hinna parish which is part of the Ytre Stavanger prosti (deanery) in the Diocese of Stavanger. The brick church was built in a rectangular design in 1967 using designs by the architects Eyvind Retzius and Svein Bjoland. The church seats about 700 people. The church was consecrated on 29 October 1967.

== See also ==
- List of churches in Rogaland
