= St. Petri Church =

Church in Rogaland, Norway

- St. Peter's Church / Sankt Petri kirke Petrikirken
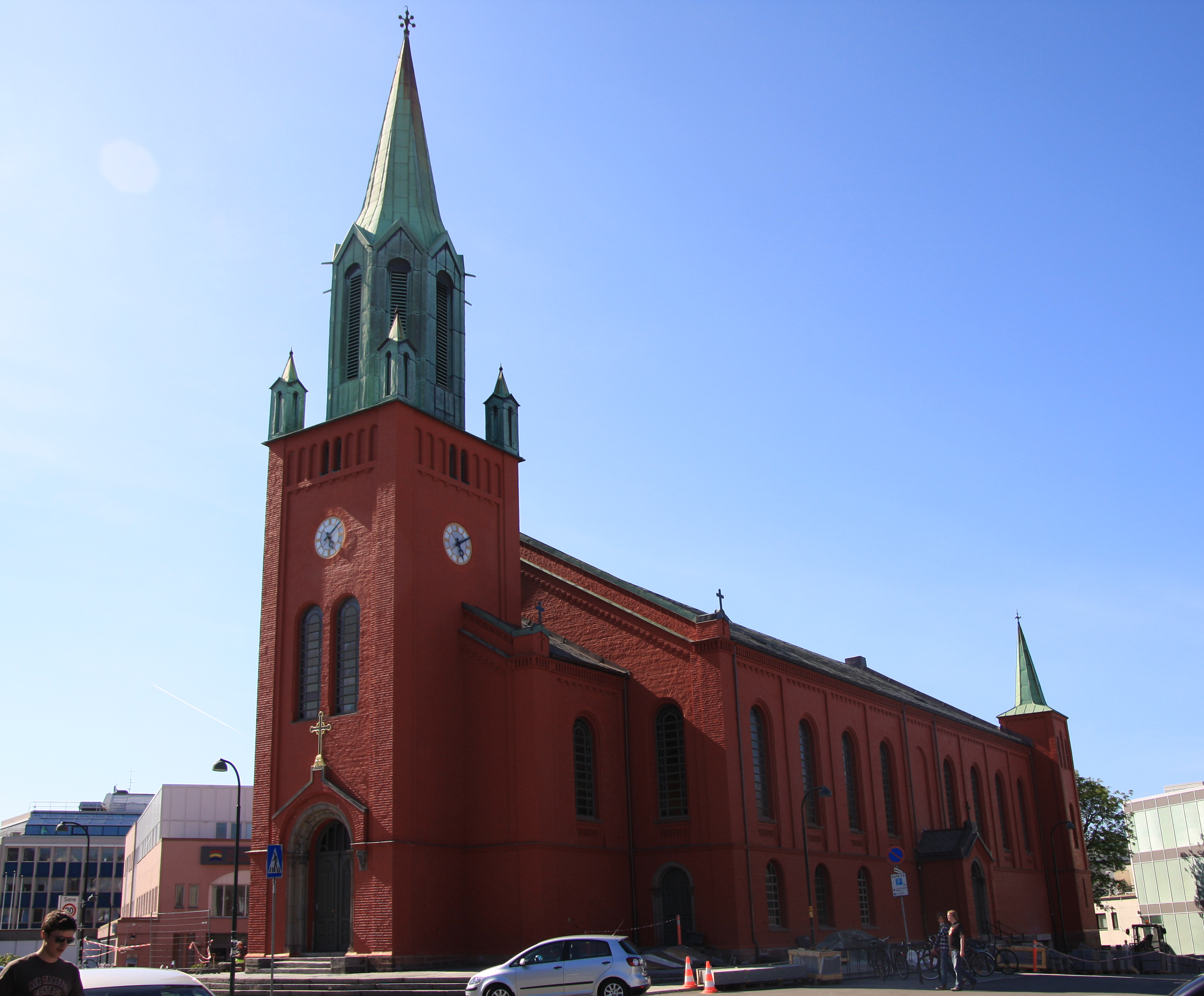
- View of the church
- St. Petri Church
- 58.970498°N 5.736734°E
- Location: Stavanger Municipality, Rogaland
- Country: Norway
- Denomination: Church of Norway
- Churchmanship: Evangelical Lutheran

History
- Status: Parish church
- Founded: 13th century
- Consecrated: 1866

Architecture
- Functional status: Active
- Architect: Fritz von der Lippe
- Architectural type: Long church
- Completed: 1866 (160 years ago)

Specifications
- Capacity: 900
- Materials: Brick

Administration
- Diocese: Stavanger bispedømme
- Deanery: Stavanger domprosti
- Parish: Domkirken og St. Petri
- Norwegian Cultural Heritage Site
- Type: Church
- Status: Automatically protected
- ID: 85539

St. Petri Church (Norwegian: St. Petri kirke) is a parish church of the Church of Norway in the large Stavanger Municipality in Rogaland county, Norway. It is located in the borough of Storhaug which lies near the centre of the city of Stavanger in the far southwestern part of the municipality. It is one of the two churches for the Domkirken og St. Petri parish which is part of the Stavanger domprosti (arch-deanery) in the Diocese of Stavanger. The red, brick church was built in a long church style in 1866 using designs by the architect Fritz von der Lippe. The church seats about 900 people. The church is informally called the Petrikirken.

== History ==
The earliest existing historical records of the church date back to the 1270s when King Magnus determined that there would be a new church built in Stavanger that was dedicated to St. Peter (in addition to the already existing Stavanger Cathedral). The new church stood a short distance east of the cathedral on a ridge east of Skolebekken. Some time later, the king donated the church to a hospital and it became a hospital church. The local bishop also gifted some land to the hospital church and built a house for the priest and a servant. The hospital church was in use throughout the middle ages and records in the 1740s show that the hospital was still in use. It included the church and several small houses that housed the patients. By the 1800s, the city of Stavanger had grown considerably and in need of a new church, so the old church and hospital were closed and a new, much larger church was built.

== Media gallery ==
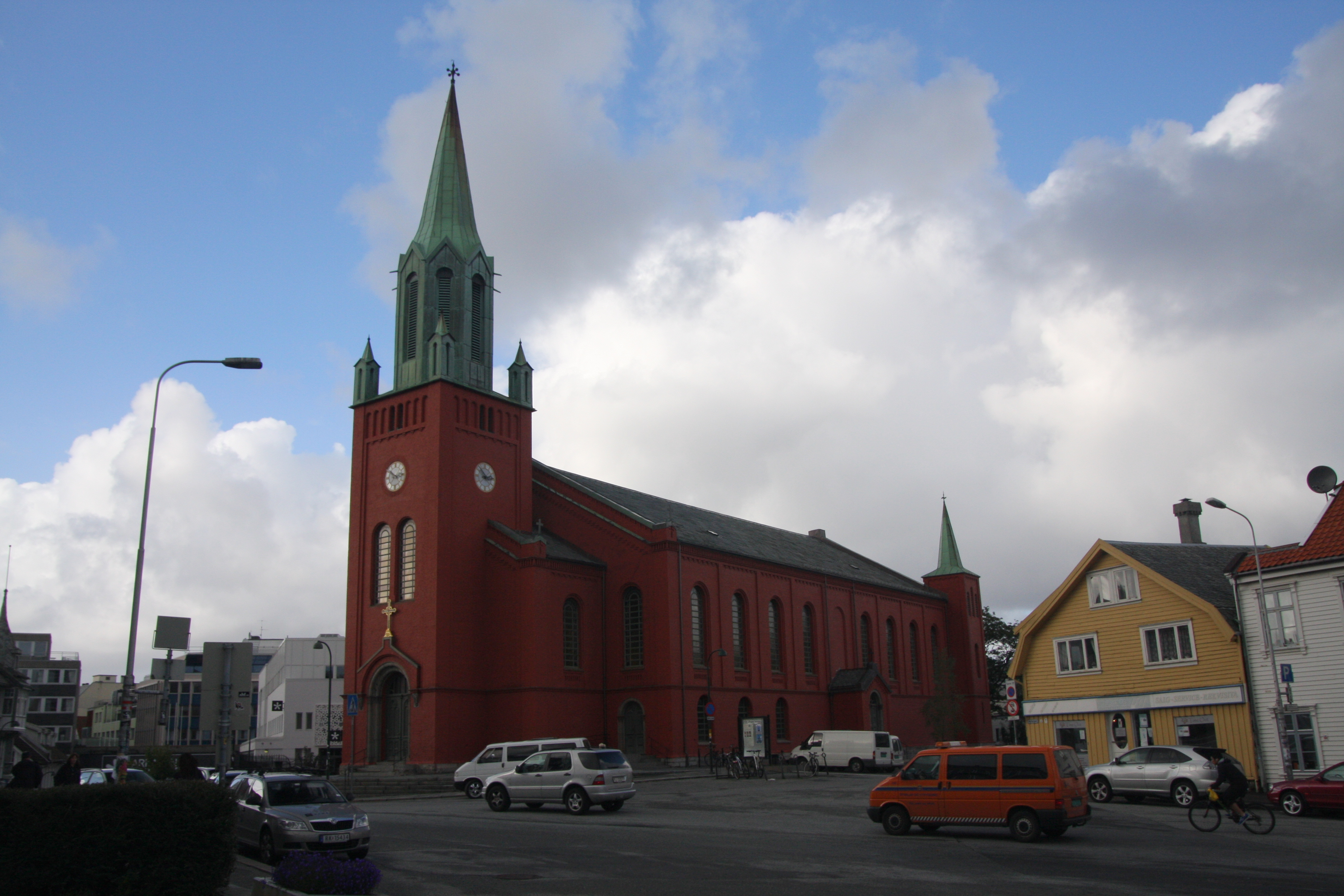

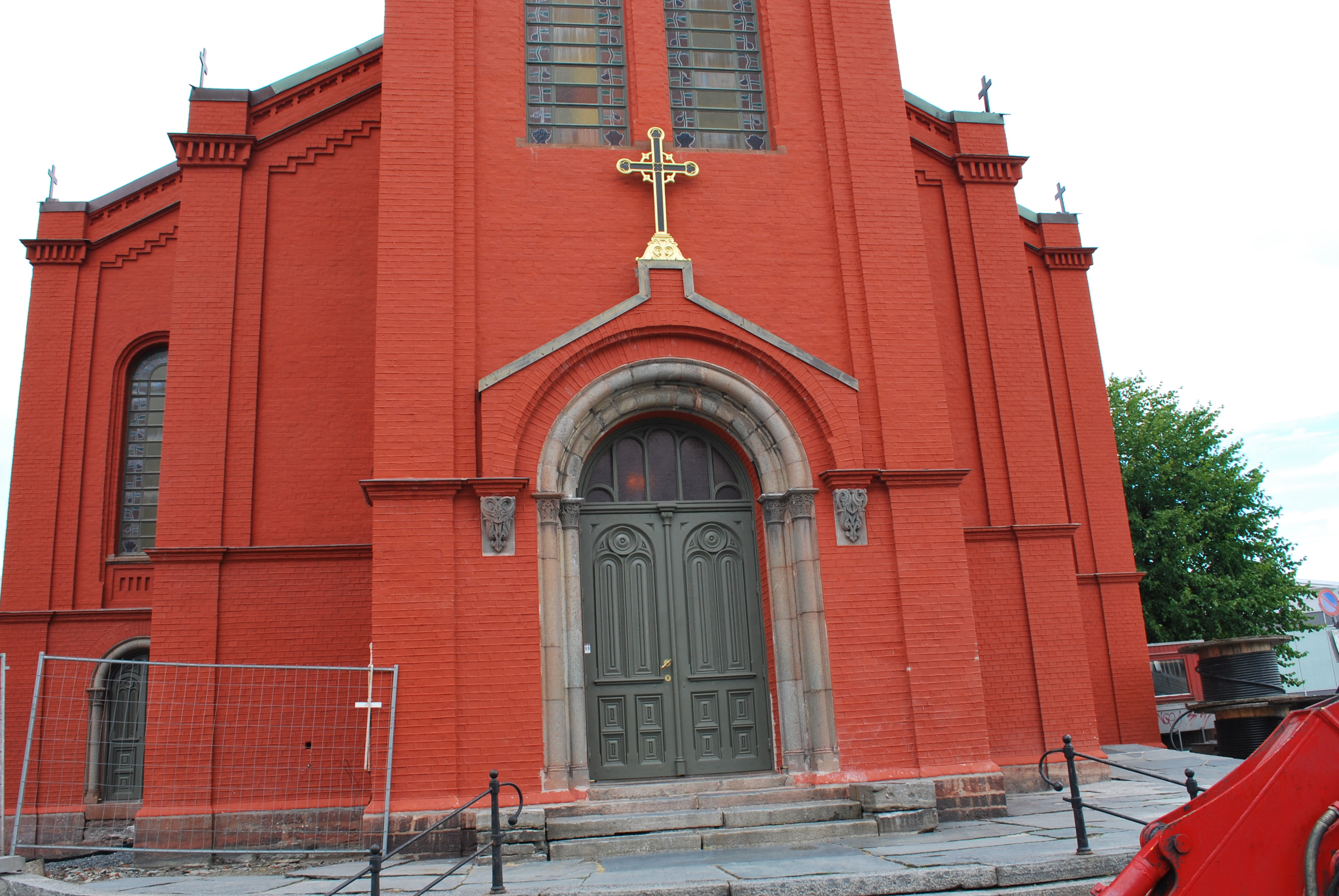

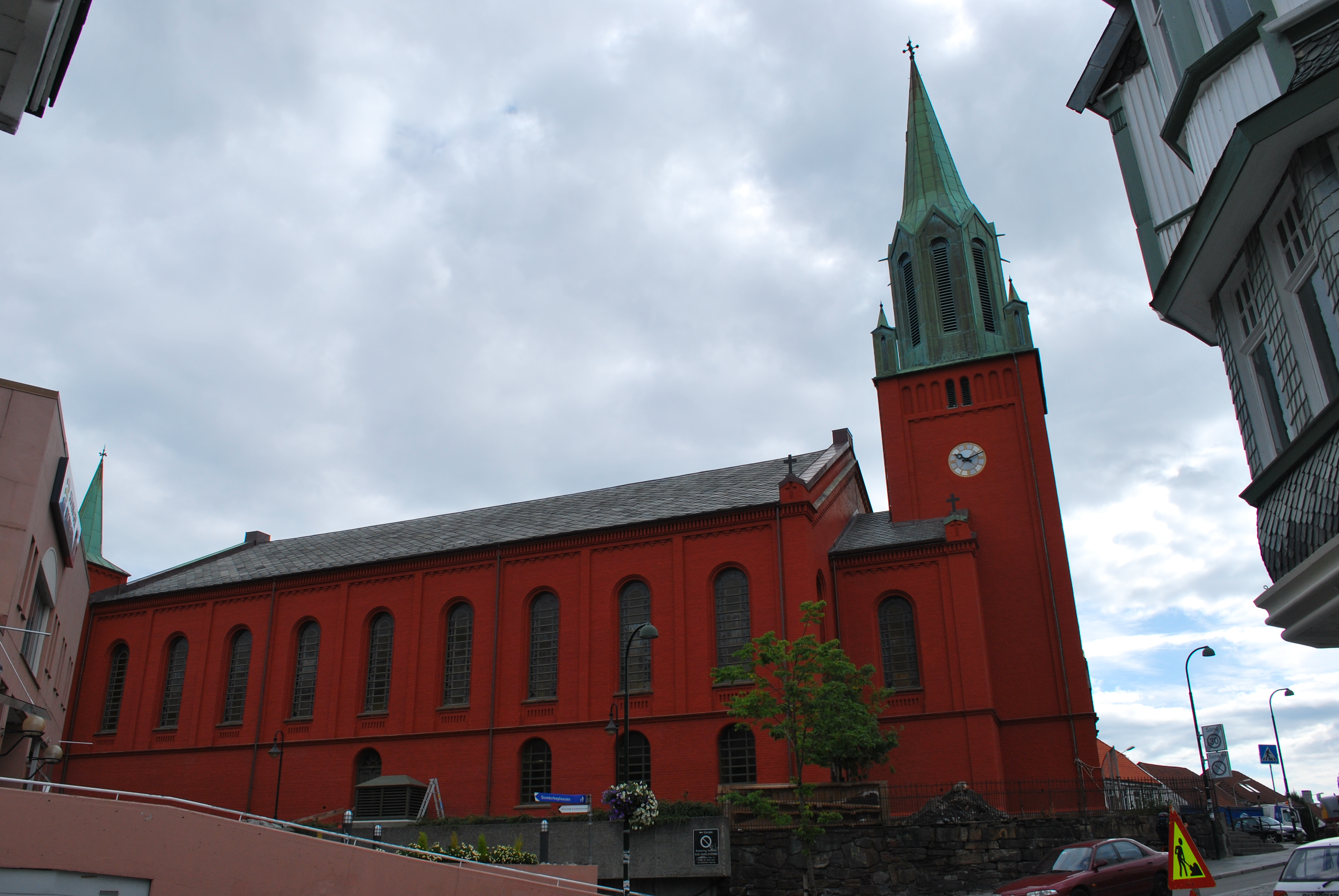

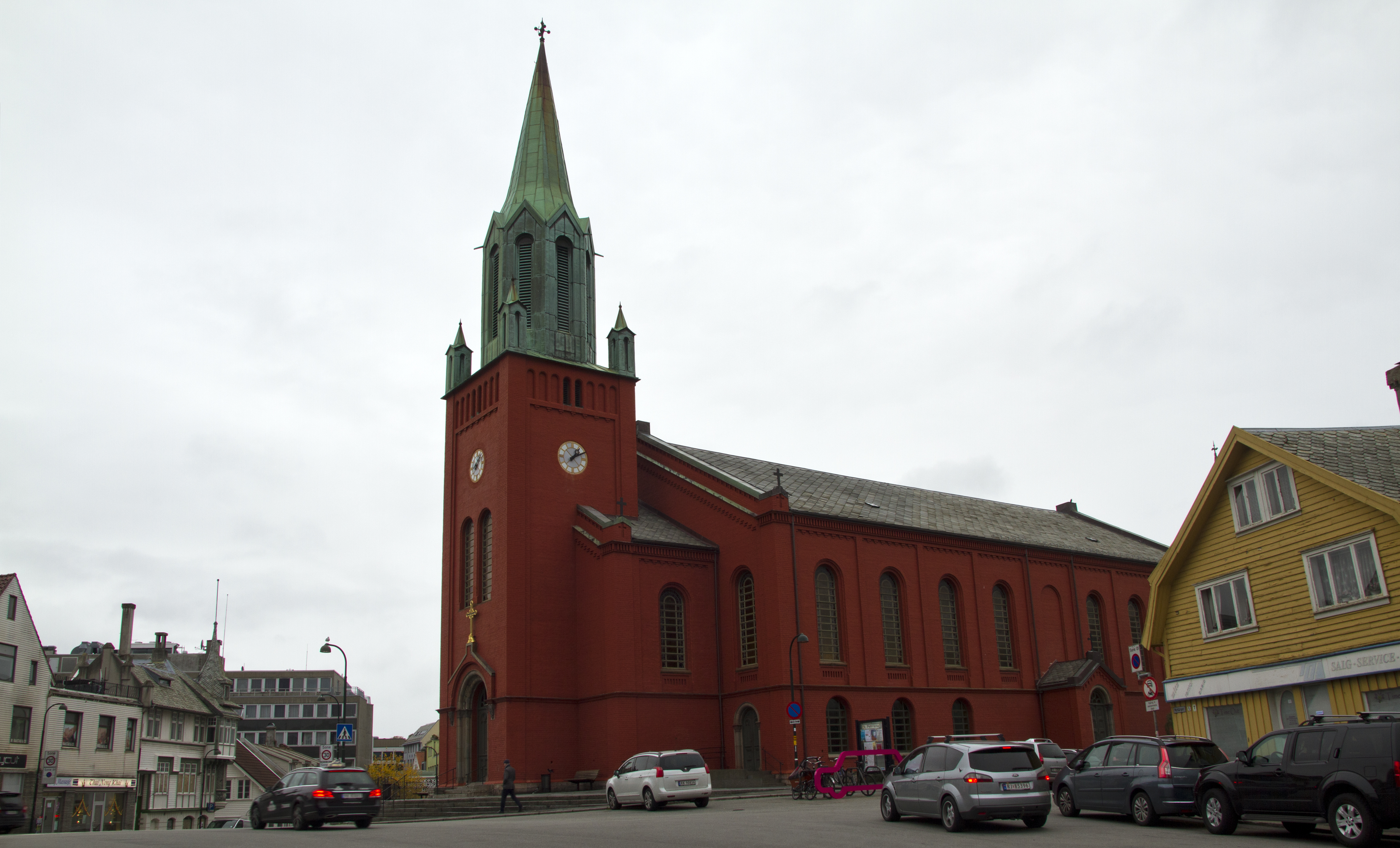

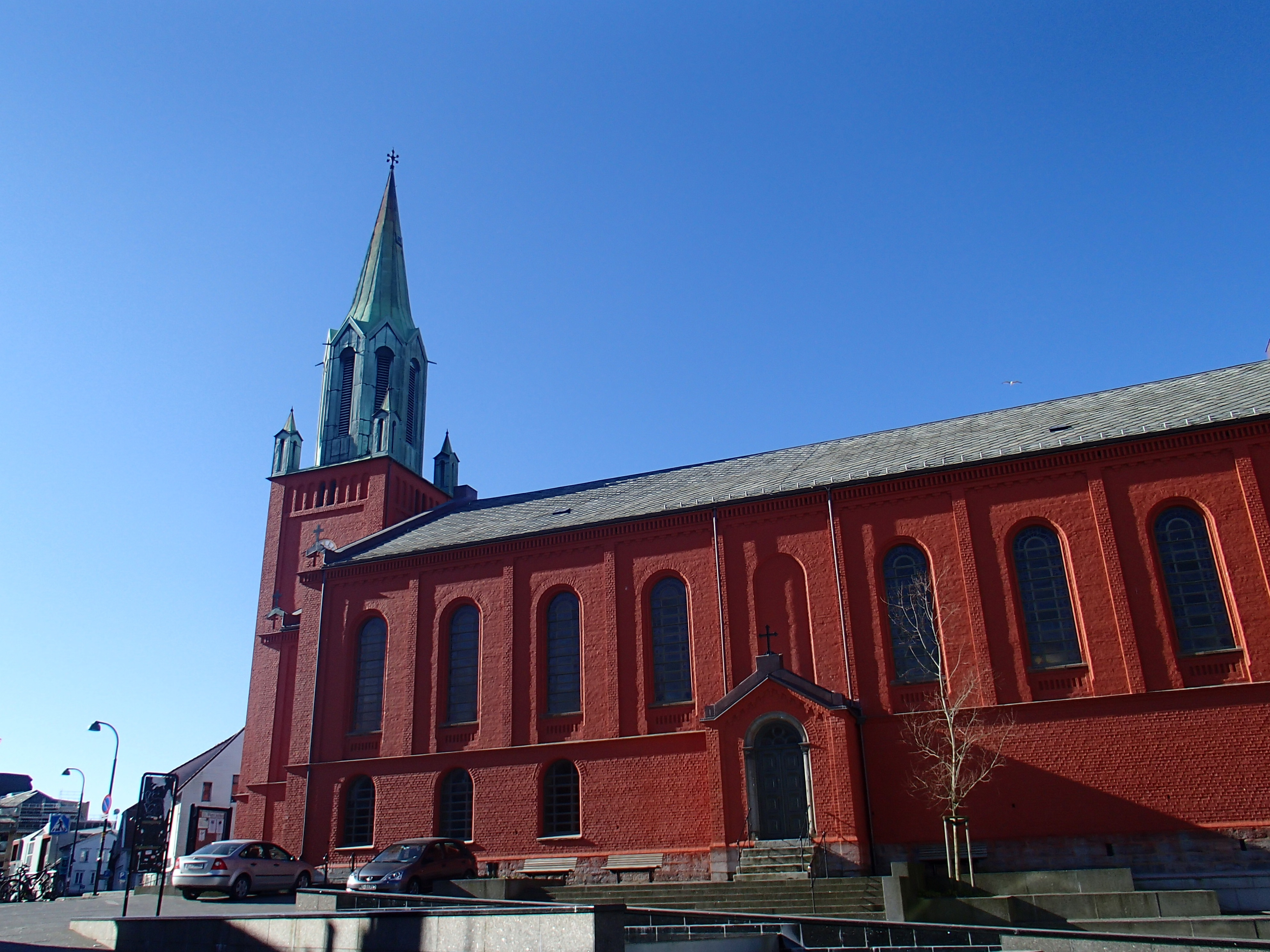

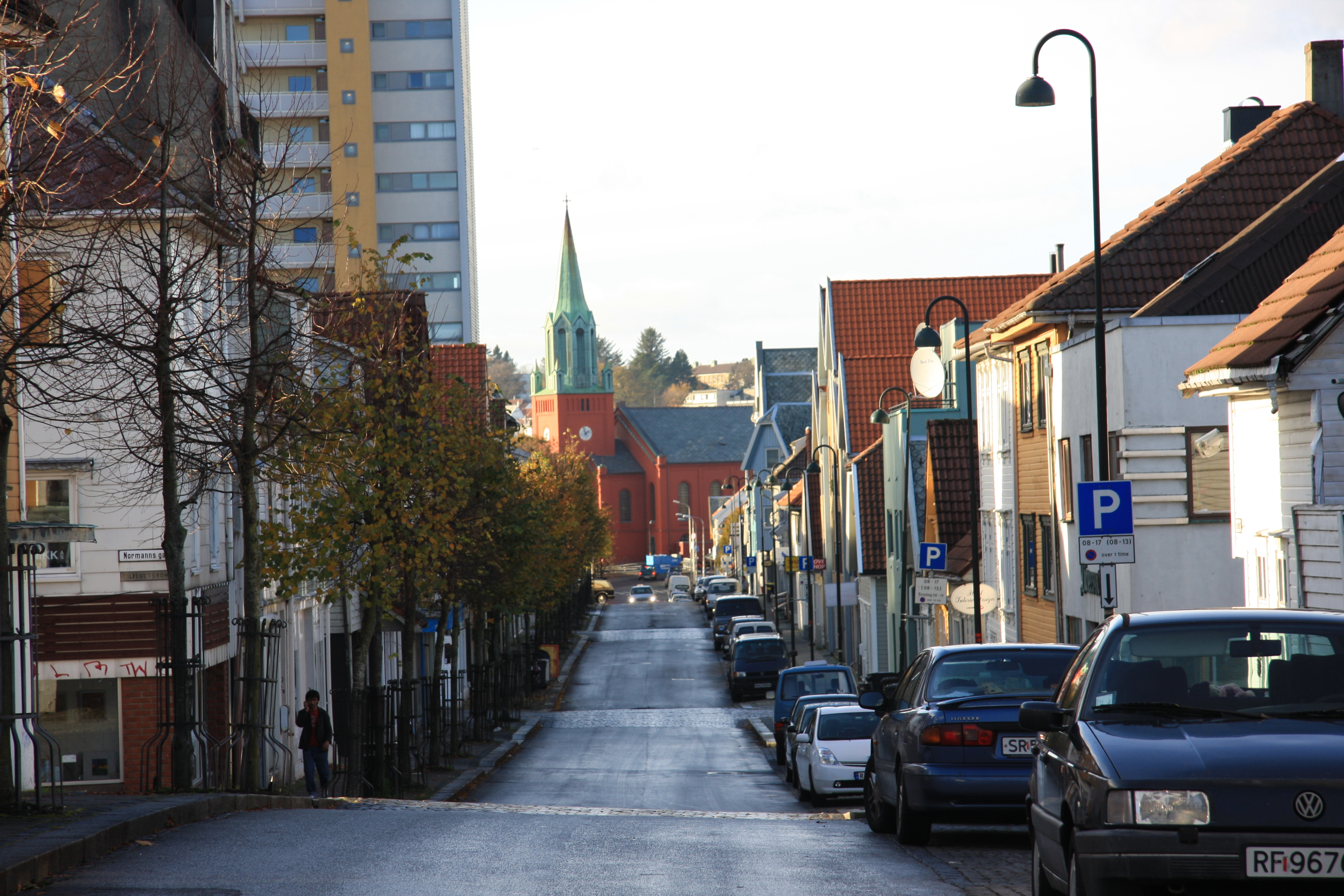

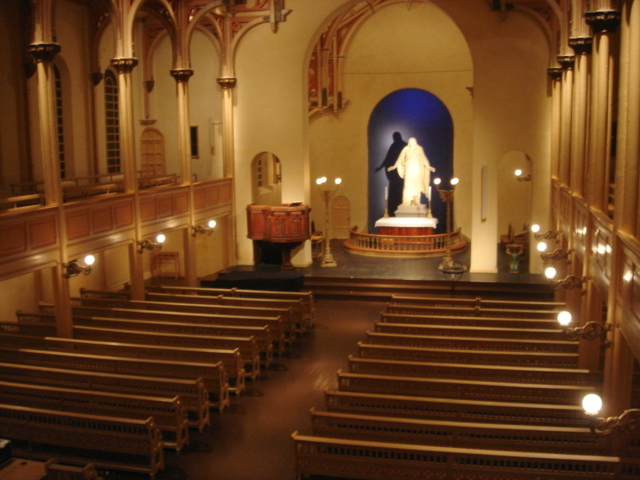

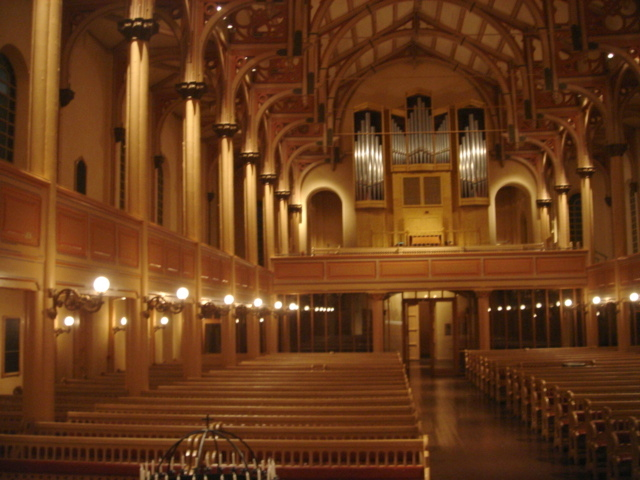

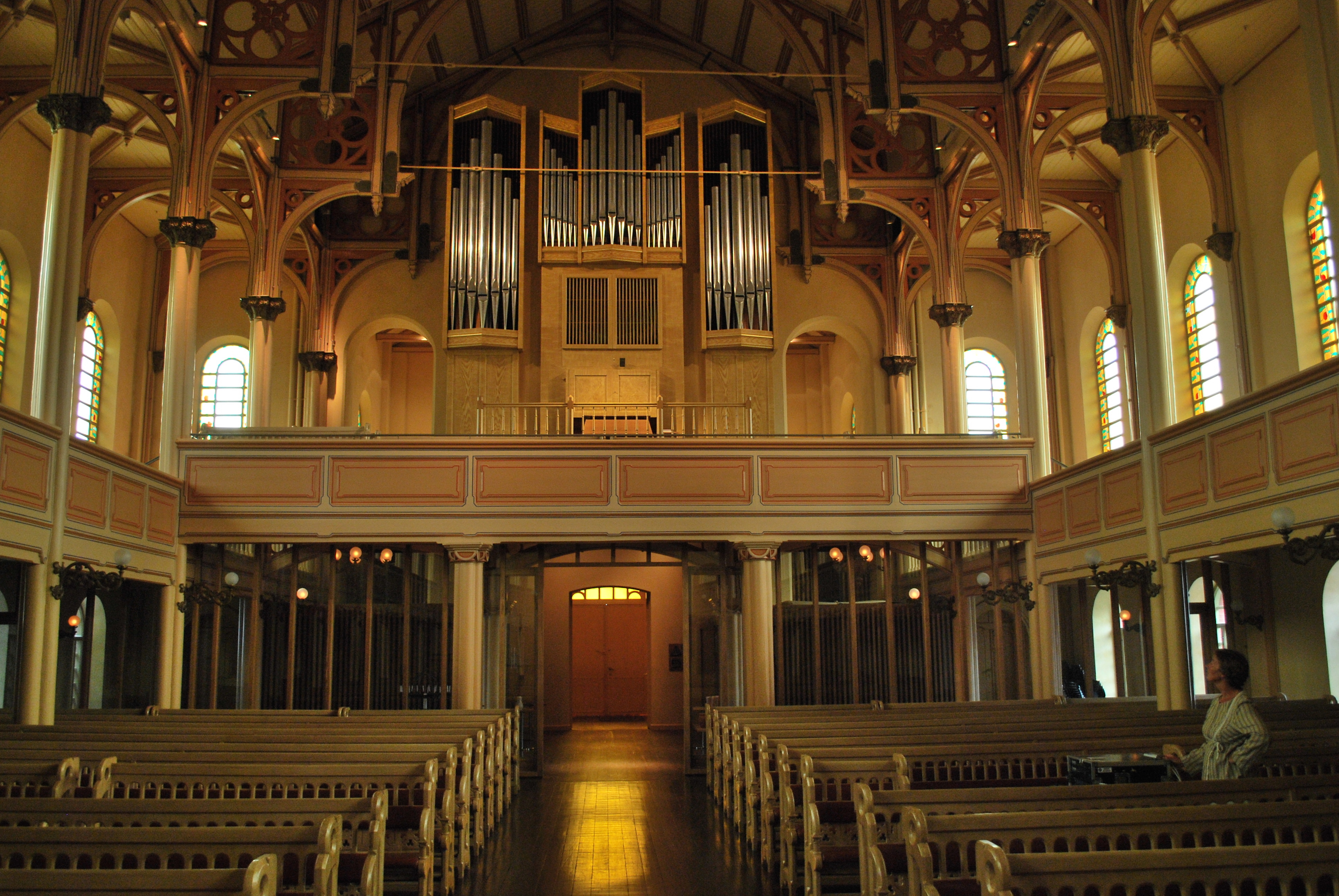

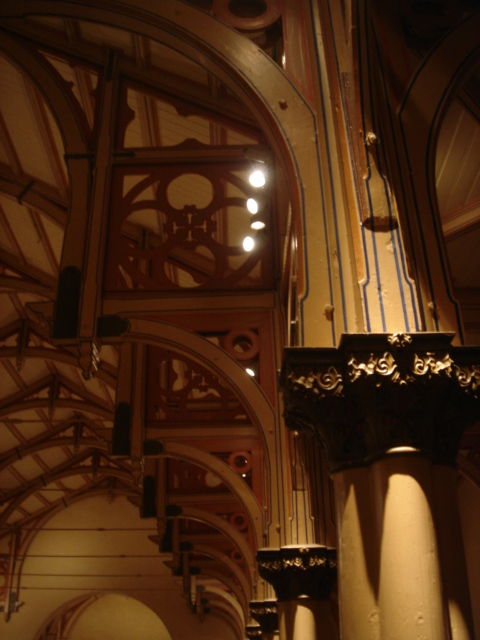

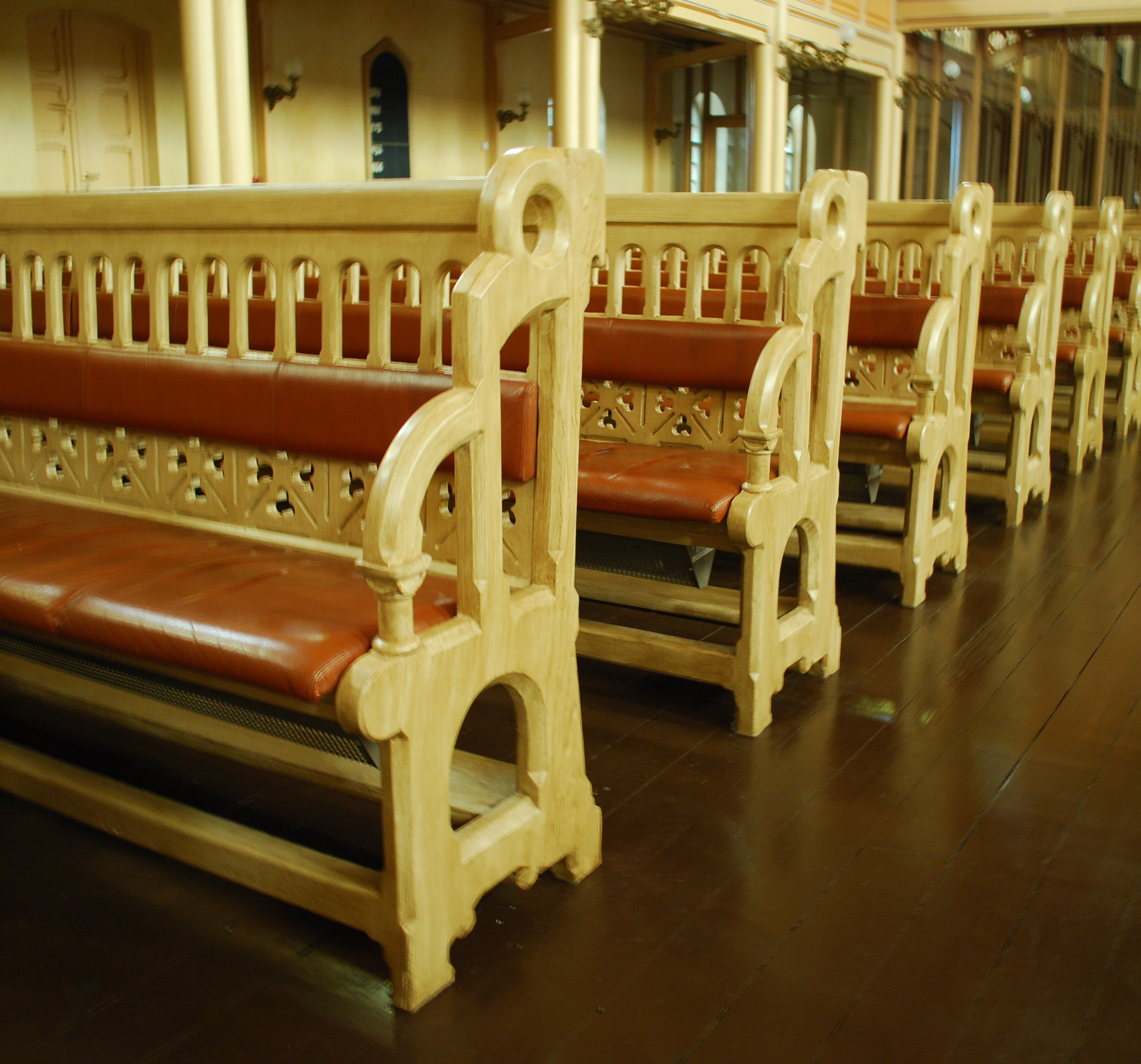

== See also ==
- List of churches in Rogaland
