= Julebygda Chapel =

Church in Rogaland, Norway

- Julebygda kapell
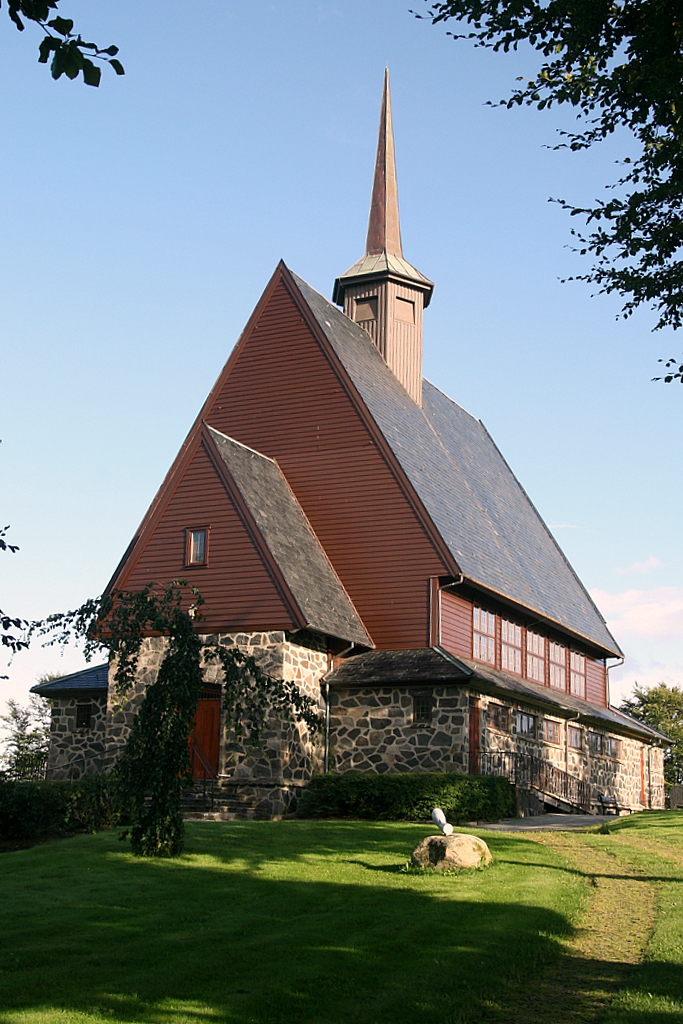
- View of the church
- Julebygda Chapel
- 58.830758°N 5.664258°E
- Location: Sandnes, Rogaland
- Country: Norway
- Denomination: Church of Norway
- Churchmanship: Evangelical Lutheran

History
- Status: Parish church
- Founded: 1957
- Consecrated: 1957

Architecture
- Functional status: Active
- Architect: Valdemar Scheel Hansteen
- Architectural type: Long church
- Completed: 1957

Specifications
- Capacity: 200
- Materials: Stone

Administration
- Diocese: Stavanger bispedømme
- Deanery: Sandnes prosti
- Parish: Gand
- Norwegian Cultural Heritage Site
- Type: Church
- Status: Not protected
- ID: 84745

Julebygda Chapel (Norwegian: Julebygda kapell) is a parish church of the Church of Norway in the large Sandnes Municipality in Rogaland county, Norway. It is located in the borough of Malmheim og Soma in the western part of city of Sandnes which lies in the far western part of the municipality. It is one of the two churches for the Gand parish which is part of the Sandnes prosti (deanery) in the Diocese of Stavanger. The stone church was constructed in a long church design in 1957 using designs by the architect Valdemar Scheel Hansteen. The church seats about 200 people.

== Media gallery ==
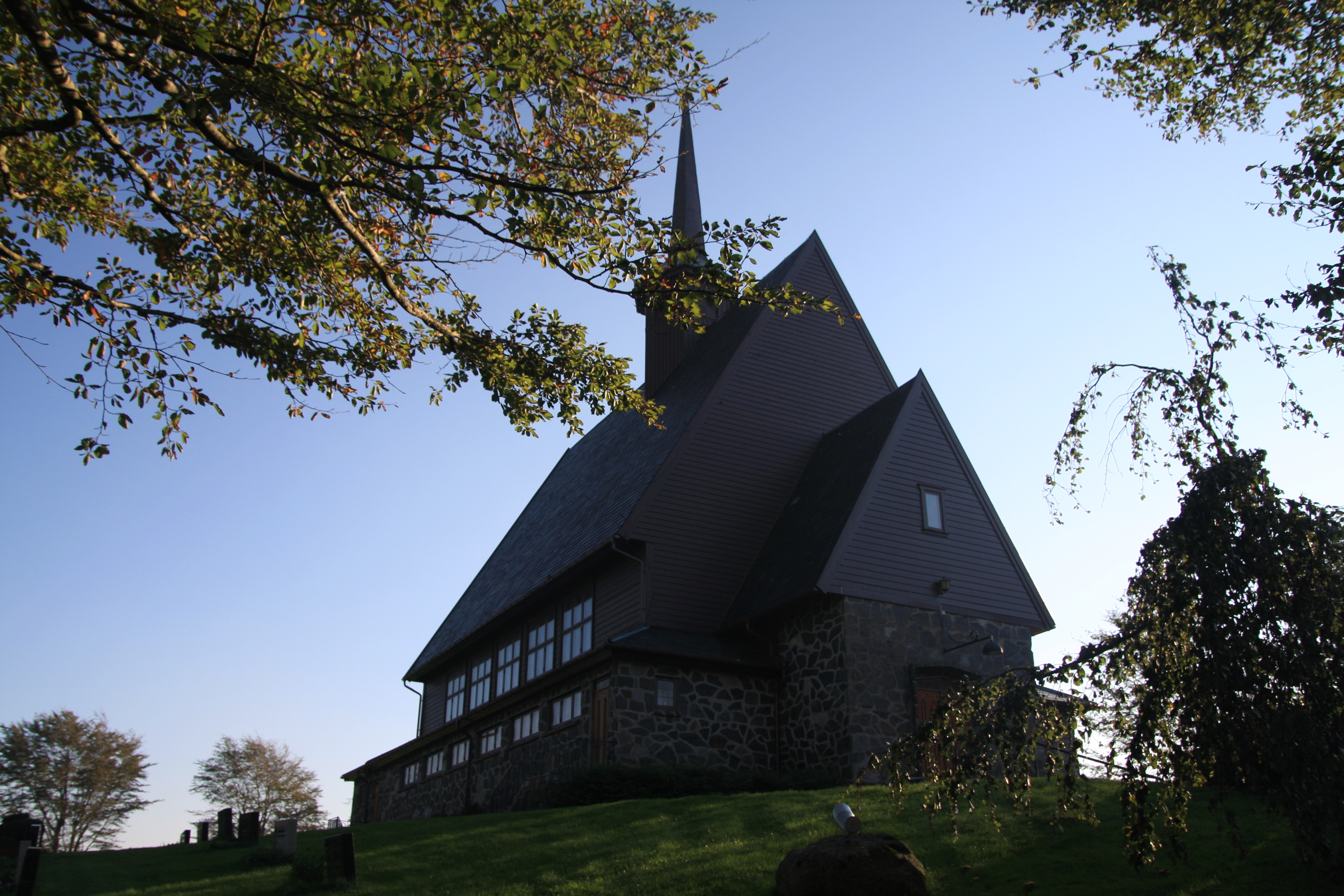

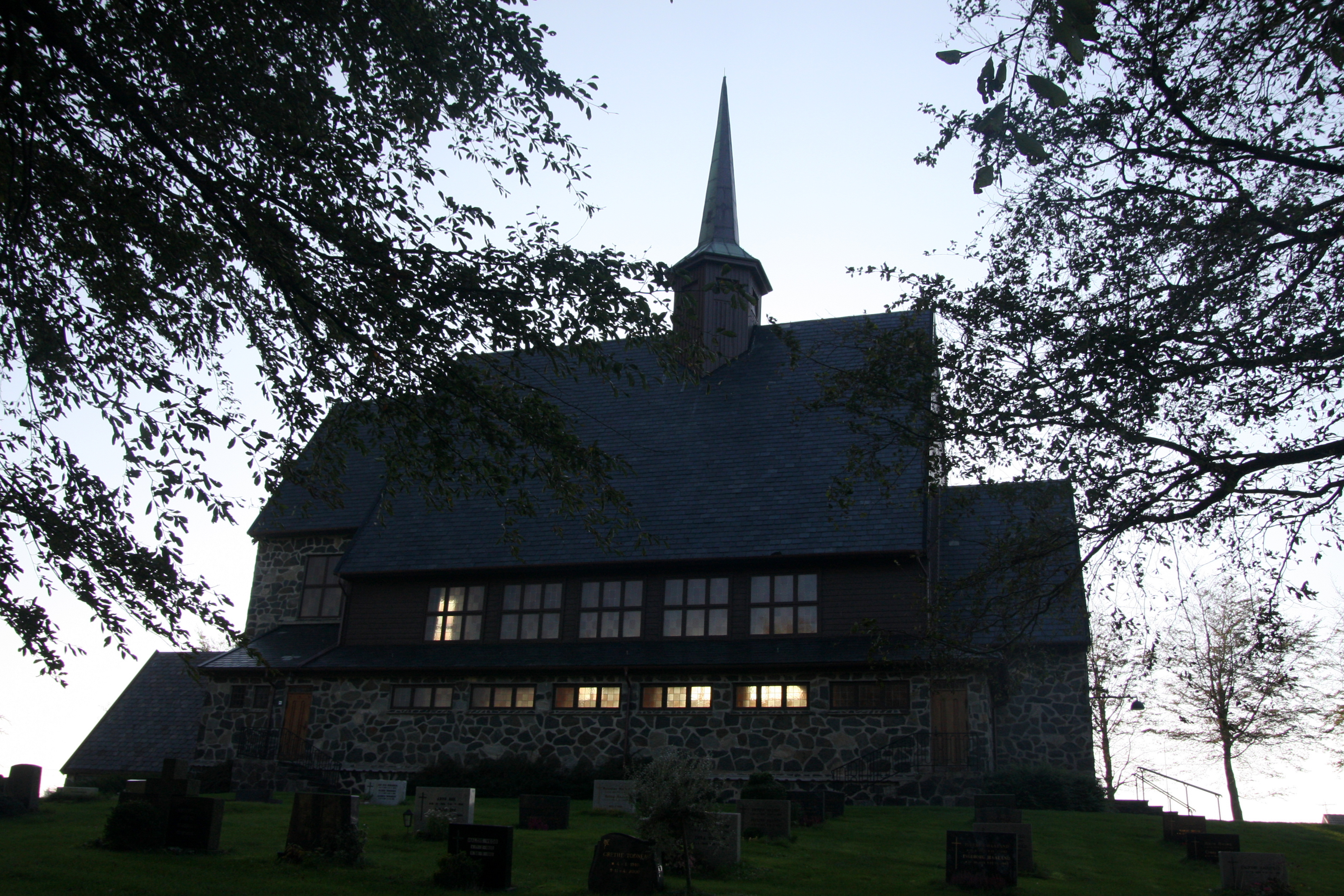

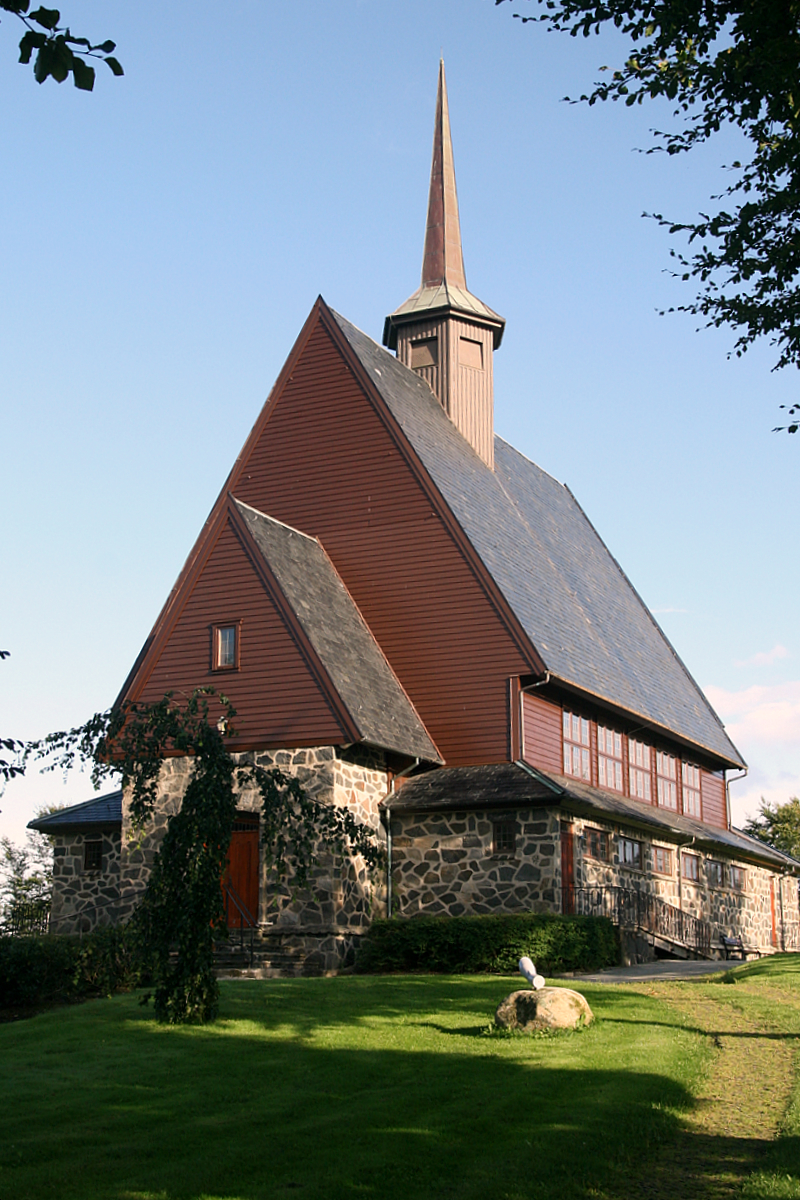

== See also ==
- List of churches in Rogaland
