= Forsand Church =

Church in Rogaland, Norway

- Forsand kyrkje
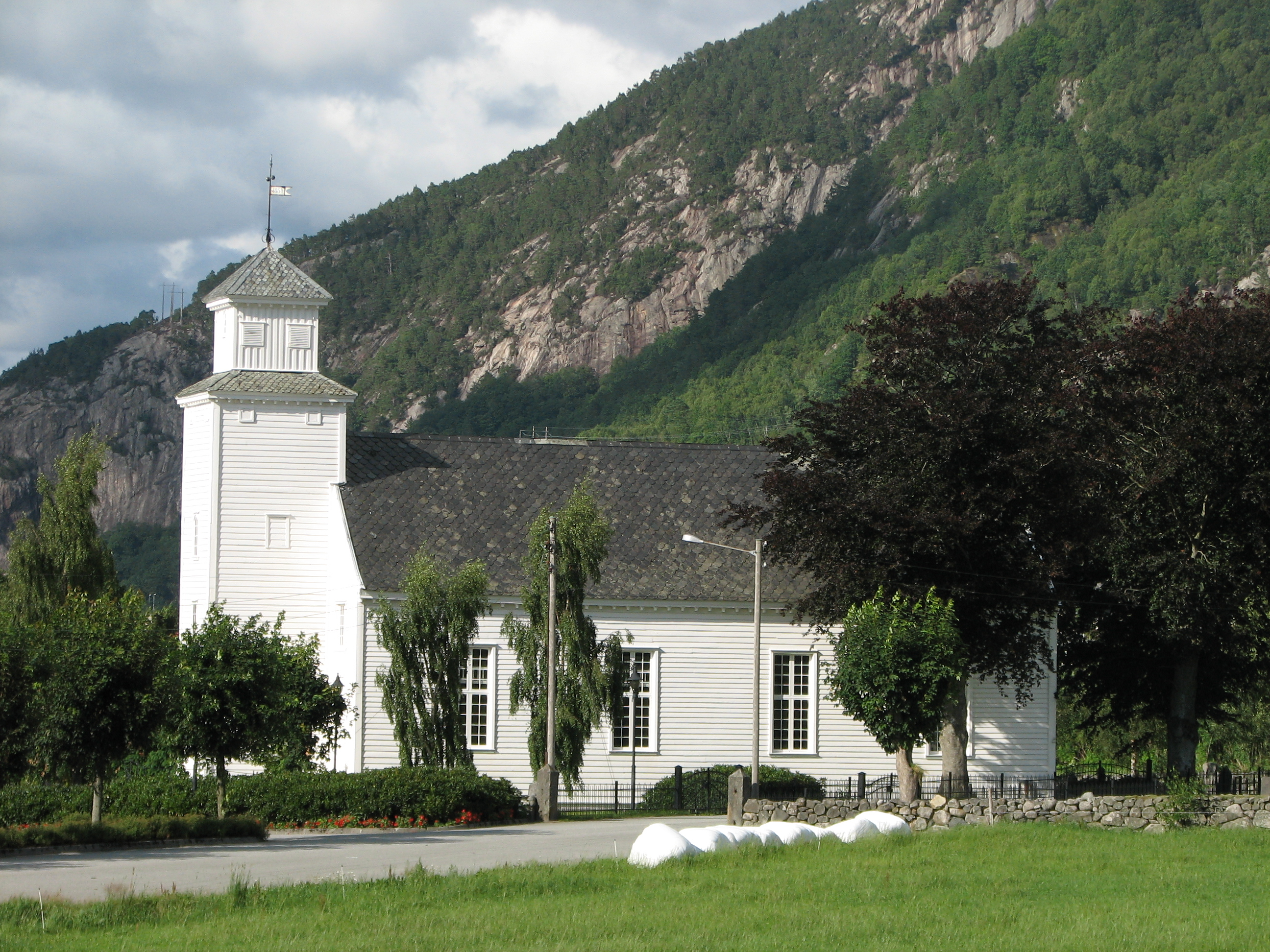
- View of the church
- Forsand Church
- 58.901205°N 6.098058°E
- Location: Sandnes Municipality, Rogaland
- Country: Norway
- Denomination: Church of Norway
- Churchmanship: Evangelical Lutheran

History
- Status: Parish church
- Founded: 1854
- Consecrated: 10 Oct 1854

Architecture
- Functional status: Active
- Architect: Hans Linstow
- Architectural type: Long church
- Groundbreaking: 13 May 1854
- Completed: 1854

Specifications
- Capacity: 300
- Materials: Wood

Administration
- Diocese: Stavanger bispedømme
- Deanery: Sandnes prosti
- Parish: Forsand
- Norwegian Cultural Heritage Site
- Type: Church
- Status: Not protected
- ID: 84182

Forsand Church (Norwegian: Forsand kyrkje) is a parish church of the Church of Norway in the eastern part of the large Sandnes Municipality in Rogaland county, Norway. It is located in the village of Forsand, near the mouth to the Lysefjorden. It is one of the two churches for the Forsand parish which is part of the Sandnes prosti (deanery) in the Diocese of Stavanger. The white, wooden church was built in a long church design in 1854 by the builder Tollak Tollaksen Gudmestad using plans drawn up by the architect Hans Linstow. The church seats about 300 people.

== History ==
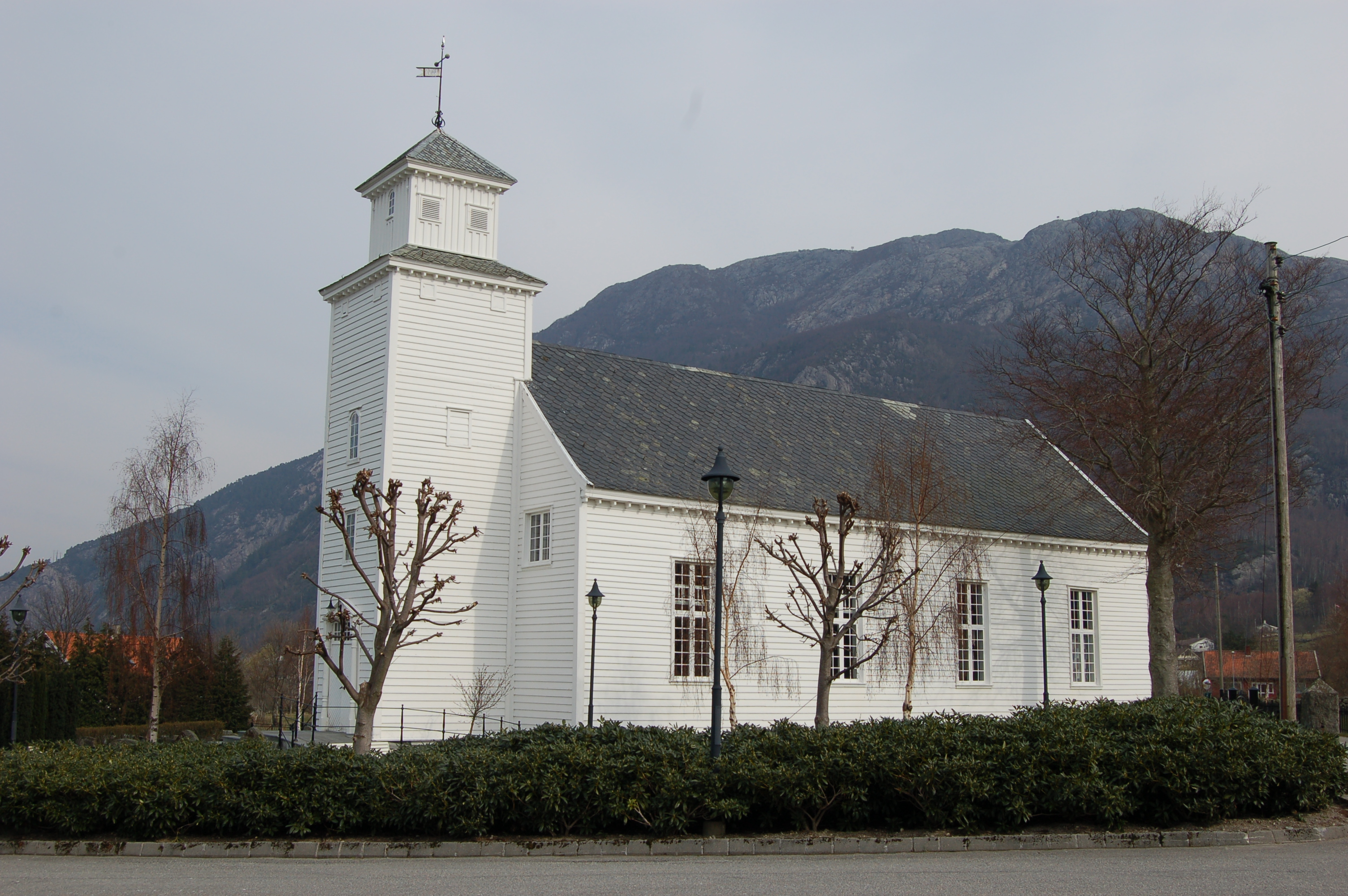
View of the church

In 1854, the new parish of Forsand was approved. Construction on the new church began on 13 May 1854, shortly before the government approved the new church. The church was consecrated on 10 October 1854 by the Bishop Jacob von der Lippe. In 1963, the choir was expanded, the pulpit was lowered, and the floor was raised and insulated. The church also received electric heating. On 19 June 2016, a large triangular addition to the church was completed on the south side of the church, adding bathrooms, small group rooms, a chapel, and a kitchen.

== See also ==
- List of churches in Rogaland
