= Bekkefaret Church =

Church in Rogaland, Norway

- Bekkefaret kirke
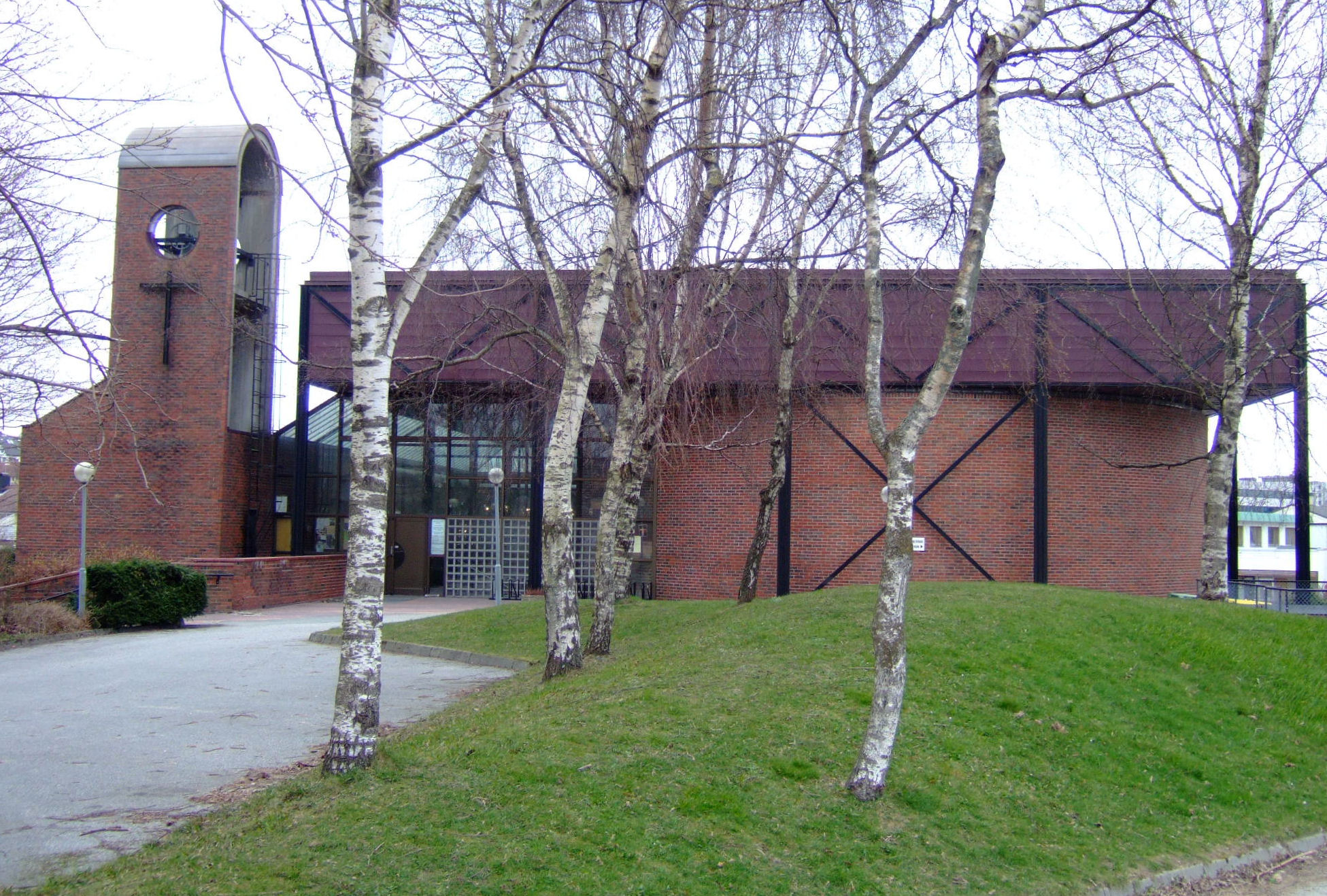
- View of the church
- Bekkefaret Church
- 58.951003°N 5.728528°E
- Location: Stavanger Municipality, Rogaland
- Country: Norway
- Denomination: Church of Norway
- Churchmanship: Evangelical Lutheran

History
- Status: Parish church
- Founded: 1977
- Consecrated: 1977

Architecture
- Functional status: Active
- Architect(s): Per Amund Riseng & Jan Stensrud
- Architectural type: Semi-circular
- Completed: 1977 (49 years ago)

Specifications
- Capacity: 550
- Materials: Brick

Administration
- Diocese: Stavanger bispedømme
- Deanery: Stavanger domprosti
- Parish: Bekkefaret
- Norwegian Cultural Heritage Site
- Type: Church
- Status: Not protected
- ID: 83861

Bekkefaret Church (Norwegian: Bekkefaret kirke) is a parish church of the Church of Norway in Stavanger Municipality in Rogaland county, Norway. It is located in the Bekkefaret neighborhood in the borough of Hillevåg in the city of Stavanger. It is the church for the Bekkefaret parish which is part of the Stavanger domprosti (arch-deanery) in the Diocese of Stavanger. The red brick church was built in a semi-circular design in 1977 using designs by the architects Per Amund Riseng and Jan Stensrud. The church seats about 550 people.

== See also ==
- List of churches in Rogaland
