= Bekkefaret =

Neighbourhood in Stavanger, Norway

Coordinates: 58°57′2″N 5°43′43″E

Bekkefaret is a neighborhood in the city of Stavanger which lies in the southwestern part of the large municipality of Stavanger in Rogaland county, Norway. It is located in the borough of Hillevåg, along the European route E39 highway. This part of the city is the location of the Stavanger University Hospital and Bekkefaret Church.

There are two schools in Bekkefaret (Auglend and Ullandhaug), and sports clubs SK Jarl and Stavanger IF are vital parts of the local community. This part of the city is also famous for its nature reserves: Mosvatnet, Vaalandsskogen, and Ullandhaugskogen. Former politician Hallgeir Langeland often roam the streets of Bekkefaret.
