= Sandnes Church (Rogaland) =

Church in Rogaland, Norway

- Sandnes kirke
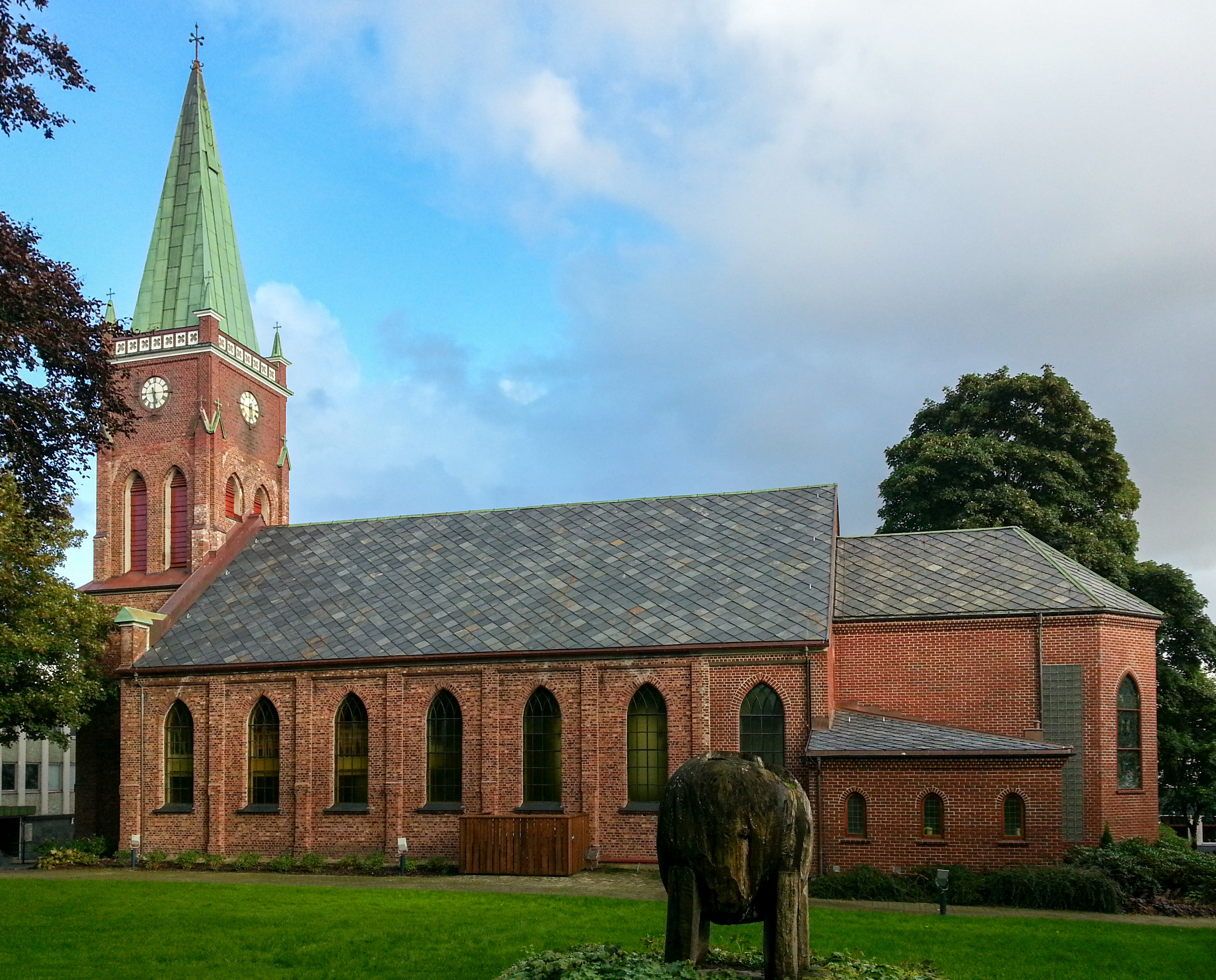
- View of the church
- Sandnes Church
- 58.85285°N 5.73356°E
- Location: Sandnes, Rogaland
- Country: Norway
- Denomination: Church of Norway
- Churchmanship: Evangelical Lutheran

History
- Status: Parish church
- Founded: 1882
- Consecrated: 1882
- Events: 1962: Renovation

Architecture
- Functional status: Active
- Architect: Hartvig Sverdrup Eckhoff
- Architectural type: Long church
- Style: Neo-gothic
- Completed: 1882

Specifications
- Capacity: 420
- Materials: Brick

Administration
- Diocese: Stavanger bispedømme
- Deanery: Sandnes prosti
- Parish: Sandnes
- Norwegian Cultural Heritage Site
- Type: Church
- Status: Not protected
- ID: 85387

Sandnes Church (Norwegian: Sandnes kirke) is a parish church of the Church of Norway in the large Sandnes Municipality in Rogaland county, Norway. It is located in the borough of Trones og Sentrum in the centre of the city of Sandnes in the far western part of the municipality. It is the church for the Sandnes parish and it is the seat of the Sandnes prosti (deanery) in the Diocese of Stavanger. The red, brick church was built in a long church design in 1882 using plans drawn up by the architect Hartvig Sverdrup Eckhoff. The neo-gothic church seats about 420 people.

== History ==
The city of Sandnes was established as a ladested in 1860 and at the same time it was separated from the large Høyland Municipality. The city was without a church of its own for its first 22 years in existence. During that time, residents of the new city-municipality of Sandnes (and parish) had to go to the nearby Høyland Church, located in outside of the city (and in a different parish). It wasn't until 1880 when the parish began to raise funds and construct the new church. The new church was completed in 1882. When the church was renovated in 1962–1963, the nave and choir were extended in order to enlarge the church.

== Media gallery ==
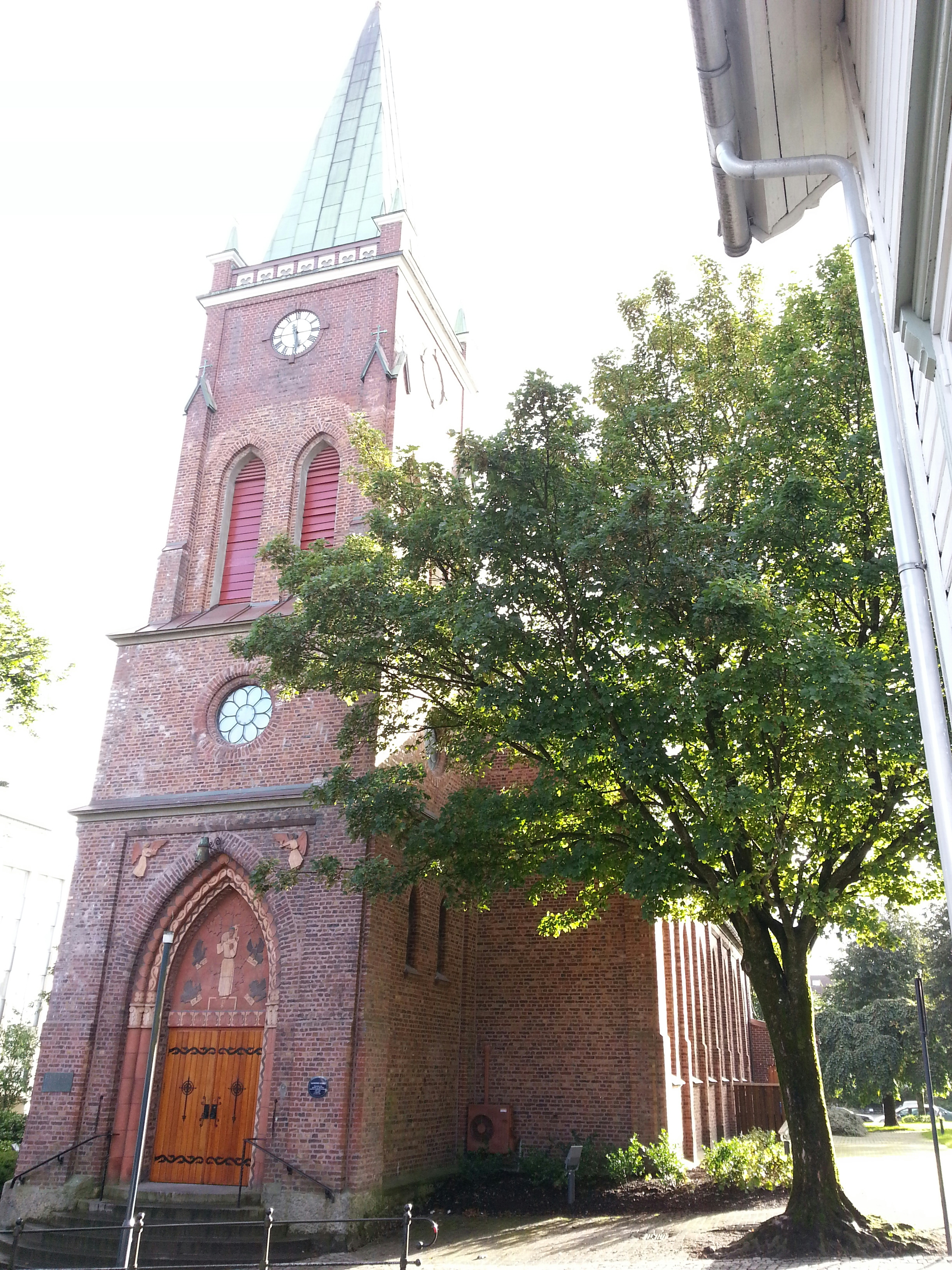

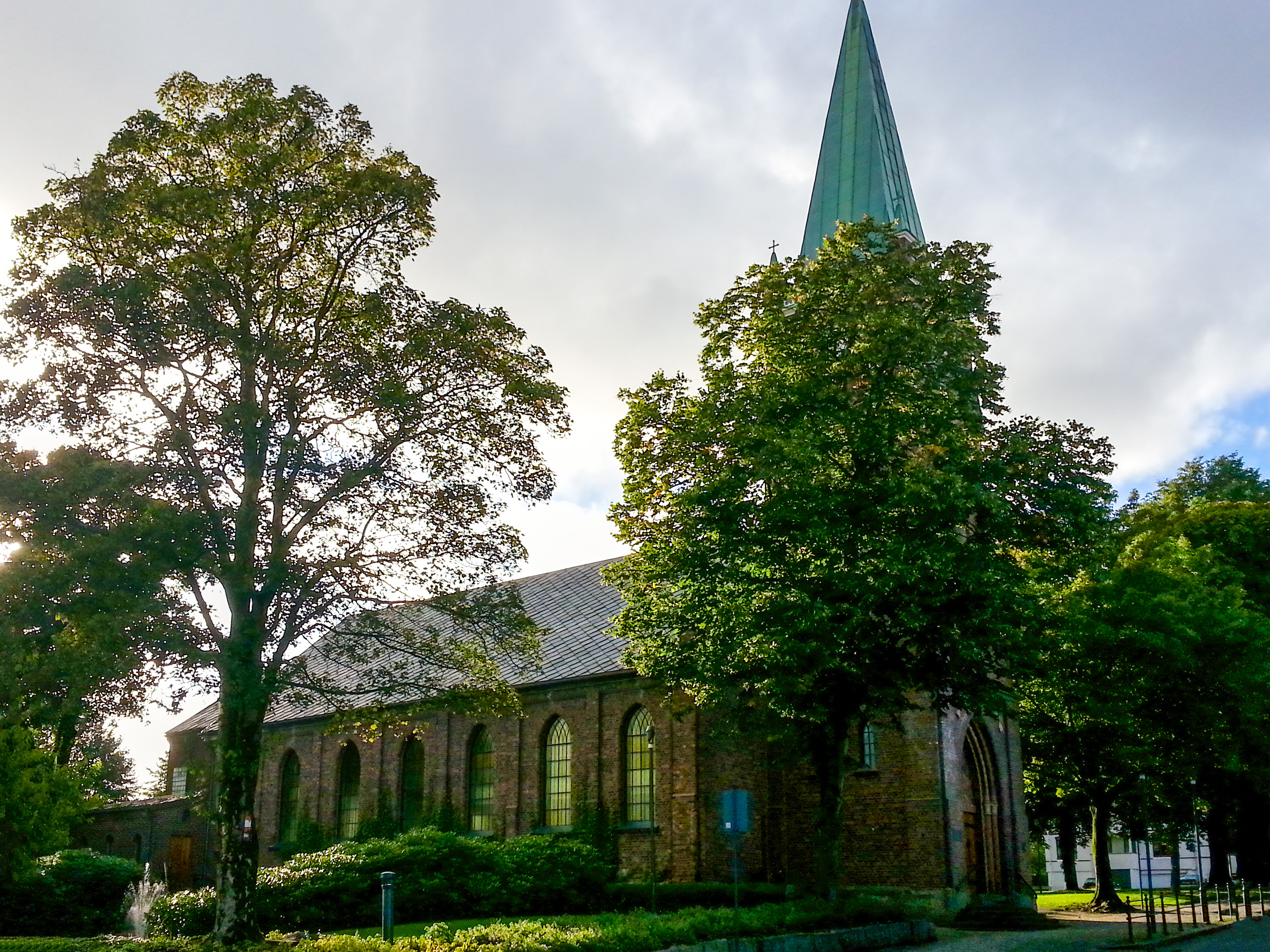

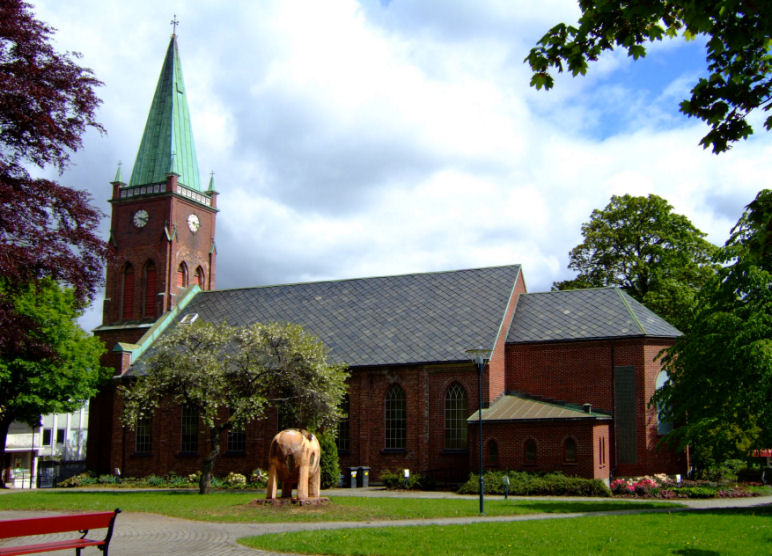

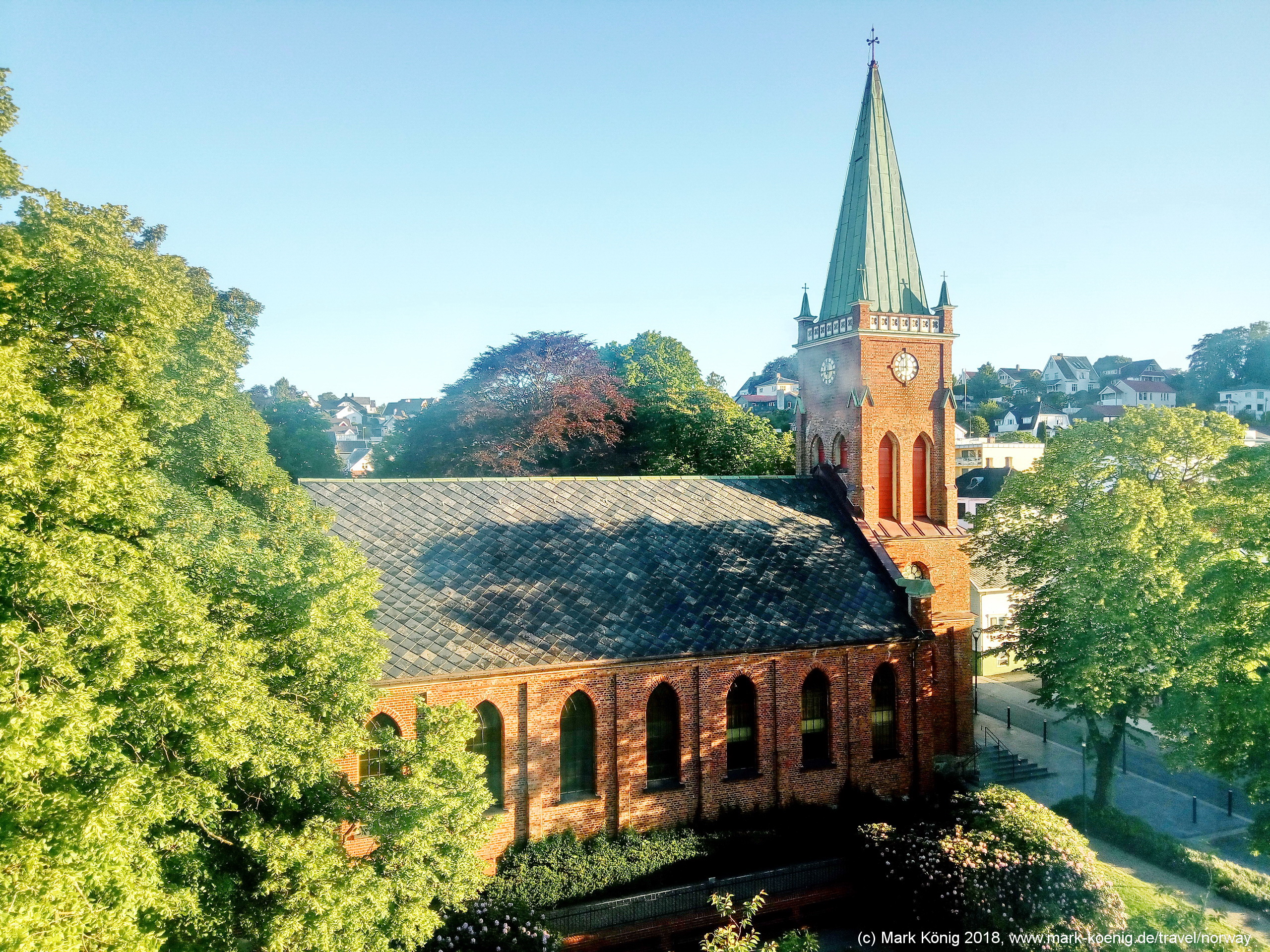

== See also ==
- List of churches in Rogaland
