= Malmheim og Soma =

Borough in Sandnes, Norway

Bydel Malmheim og Soma
- Borough
- Coat of arms

- Location within Sandnes Municipality
- Interactive map of Bydel Malmheim og Soma
- Coordinates: 58°49′53″N 05°39′47″E
- Country: Norway
- Region: Western Norway
- County: Rogaland
- District: Jæren
- City: Sandnes

Area
  - Total: 20 km^{2} (7.7 sq mi)

Population (2016)
  - Total: 1,597
  - Density: 80/km^{2} (210/sq mi)
- Time zone: UTC+01:00 (CET)
  - Summer (DST): UTC+02:00 (CEST)
- Post Code: 4312 Sandnes

Malmheim og Soma is a borough of the city of Sandnes in the western part of the large Sandnes Municipality in Rogaland county, Norway. The 20-square-kilometre (7.7 sq mi) borough sits in the western part of the municipality and it has a population of 1,597. It was created in 2011 when the old boroughs of Malmheim and Soma were merged. The Julebygda Chapel is located in the small village of Julebygda in this borough.
