= Finnøy, Stavanger =

Borough in Stavanger, Norway

Finnøy kommunedel
- Borough
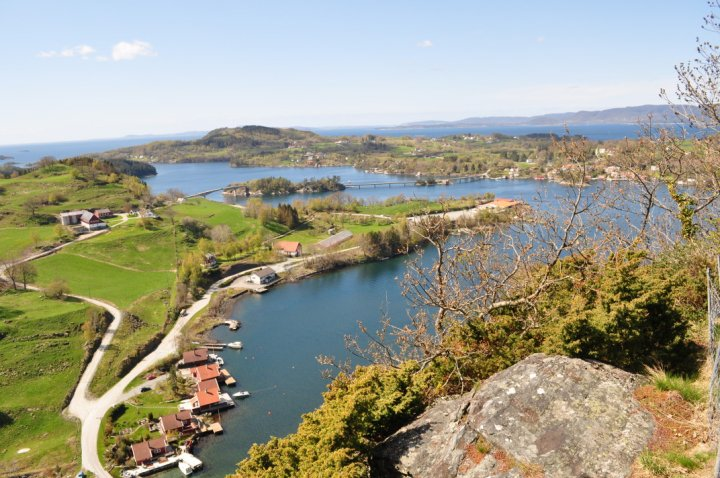
- View of the Sjernarøyane islands in the northern part of Finnøy
- Interactive map of Finnøy kommunedel
- Coordinates: 59.17054°N 5.82779°E
- Country: Norway
- Region: Central Norway
- County: Rogaland
- District: Jæren
- City: Stavanger

Area
  - Total: 104 km^{2} (40 sq mi)
- Elevation: 40 m (130 ft)

Population (2024)
  - Total: 3,424
  - Density: 32.9/km^{2} (85.3/sq mi)
- Time zone: UTC+01:00 (CET)
  - Summer (DST): UTC+02:00 (CEST)
- Post Code: 4160 Finnøy

Finnøy is a borough in the large Stavanger Municipality in Rogaland county, Norway. The 104-square-kilometre (40 sq mi) borough is made up entirely of islands located in the Boknafjorden to the northeast of the city of Stavanger. In 2024, there were 3,424 residents of the borough, mostly living on the islands of Finnøy, Ombo, Sjernarøyane, Talgje, Fogn, and Halsnøy.

Agriculture is very important for residents on the islands, employing about 20% of the population. Finnøy is known for its tomato production, accounting for around 30 percent of the total tomato production for all of Norway.

== History ==
The old Finnøy Municipality existed from 1 January 1838 until 1 January 2020 when it became part of the newly-enlarged Stavanger Municipality. After the merger, the old Finnøy Municipality became the borough of Finnøy within the new municipality.

== Politics ==
The borough is not independently self-governing. The municipal council for Stavanger Municipality. The municipal council has delegated some responsibilities to the a borough council (Norwegian: kommunedelsutvalg) for Finnøy. The borough council consists of 11 members. The tables below show the current and historical composition of the borough council by political party.

Finnøy kommunedelsutvalg 2023–2027
Party name (in Norwegian)	Number of representatives
Labour Party (Arbeiderpartiet)	2
Conservative Party (Høyre)	3
Christian Democratic Party (Kristelig Folkeparti)	3
Centre Party (Senterpartiet)	2
Socialist Left Party (Sosialistisk Venstreparti)	1
Total number of members:	11
