= Finnøy Municipality =

Former municipality in Rogaland, Norway

Finnøy Municipality Finnøy kommune
- Former municipality
- Finnø herred (historic name)
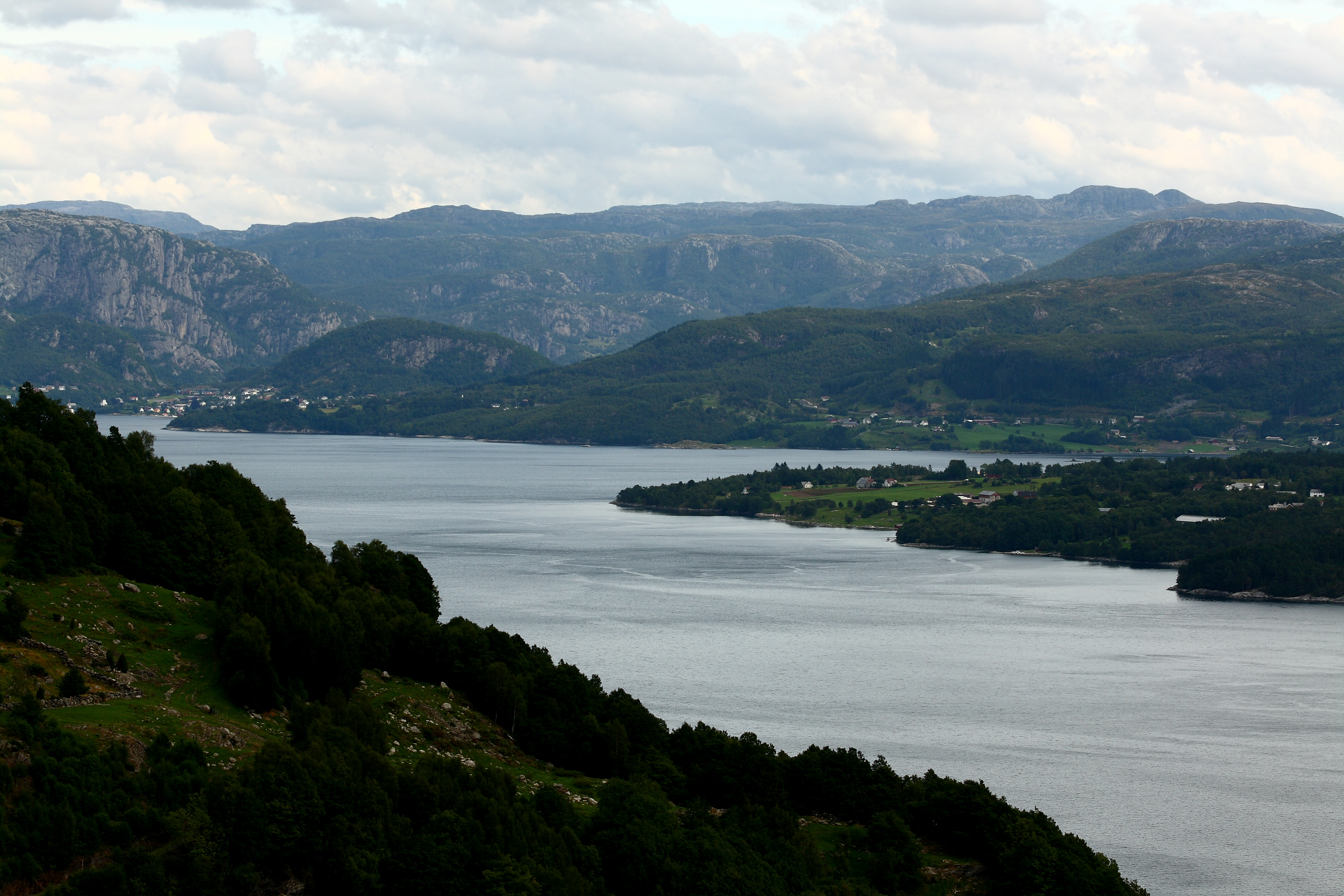
- View of the shorelines of Ombo in Finnøy

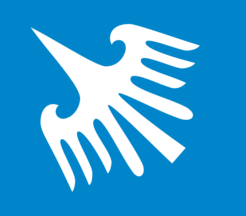
- Flag Coat of arms

- Rogaland within Norway

- Finnøy within Rogaland
- Coordinates: 59°09′53″N 05°49′46″E
- Country: Norway
- County: Rogaland
- District: Ryfylke
- Established: 1 Jan 1838
  - Created as: Formannskapsdistrikt
- Disestablished: 1 Jan 2020
  - Succeeded by: Stavanger Municipality
- Administrative centre: Judaberg

Government
  - Mayor (2015-2019): Henrik Halleland (KrF)

Area (upon dissolution)
  - Total: 104.39 km^{2} (40.31 sq mi)
  - Land: 102.90 km^{2} (39.73 sq mi)
  - Water: 1.49 km^{2} (0.58 sq mi)
  - Rank: #375 in Norway
- Highest elevation: 513.9 m (1,686 ft)

Population (2019)
  - Total: 3,150
  - Rank: #258 in Norway
  - Density: 30.2/km^{2} (78/sq mi)
  - Change (10 years): ▲ +12.9%
- Demonym: Finnøybu

Official language
  - Norwegian form: Nynorsk
- Time zone: UTC+01:00 (CET)
  - Summer (DST): UTC+02:00 (CEST)
- ISO 3166 code: NO-1141

Finnøy is a former municipality in Rogaland county, Norway. The 104.39-square-kilometre (40.31 sq mi) municipality existed from 1838 until its dissolution in 2020. The area is now part of Stavanger Municipality in the traditional district of Ryfylke. The administrative centre was the village of Judaberg.

The municipality consisted of a number of islands on the south side of the Boknafjorden, about 24 kilometres (15 mi) northeast of the city of Stavanger. The Finnøy Tunnel connects the two islands of Finnøy and Talgje to the mainland. The rest of the islands are accessible only by boat. Finnøy was an agricultural community dominated by dairy, meat, poultry, and fish farming products, with strong horticultural traditions, mainly greenhouse production of tomatoes, as well as some tourism.

Prior to its dissolution in 2020, the 104.39-square-kilometre (40.31 sq mi) municipality was the 375th largest by area out of the 422 municipalities in Norway. Finnøy Municipality was the 258th most populous municipality in Norway with a population of about 3,150. The municipality's population density was 30.2 inhabitants per square kilometre (78/sq mi) and its population had increased by 12.9% over the previous 10-year period.

== General information ==
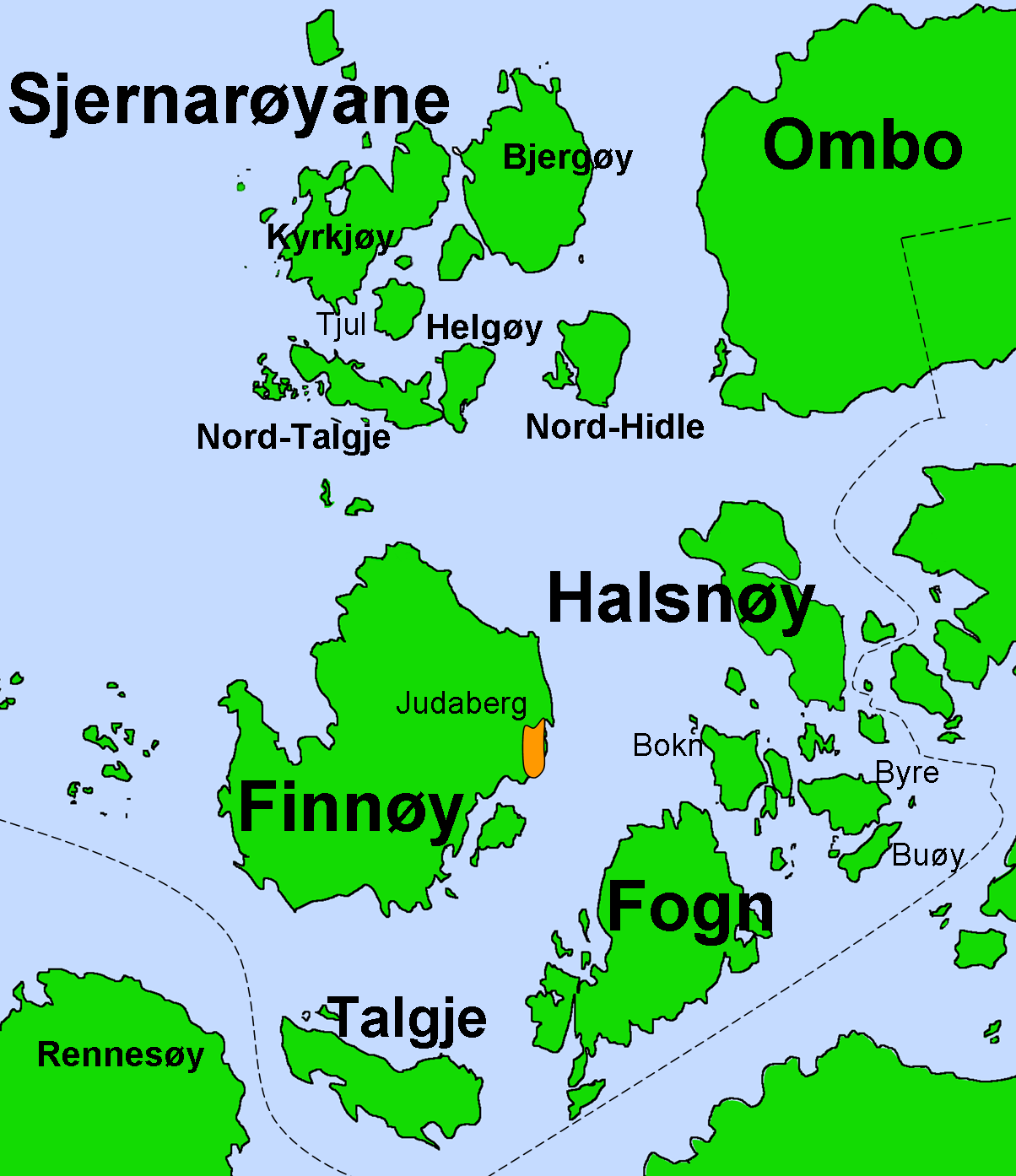
Map of Finnøy Municipality

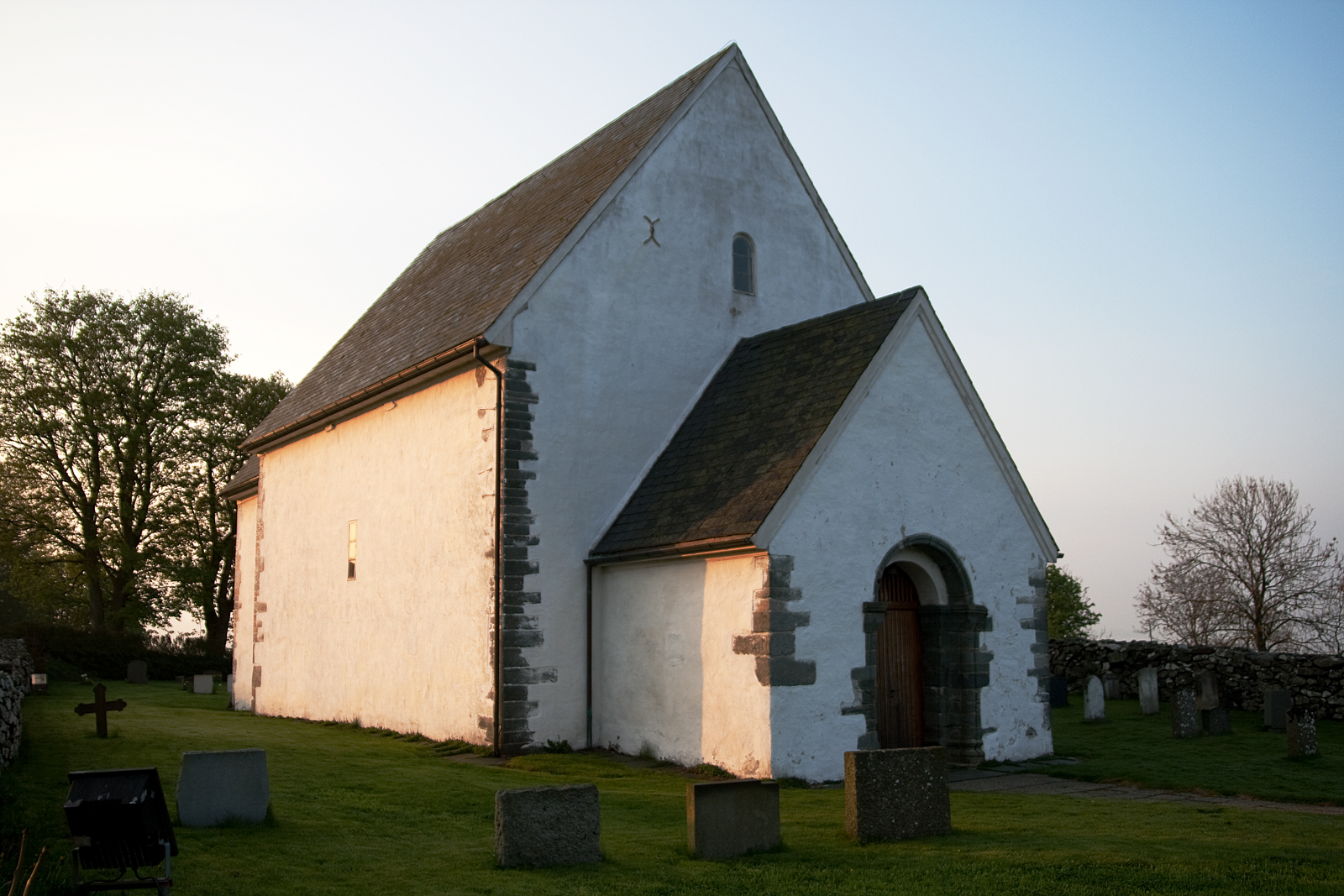
Talgje Church

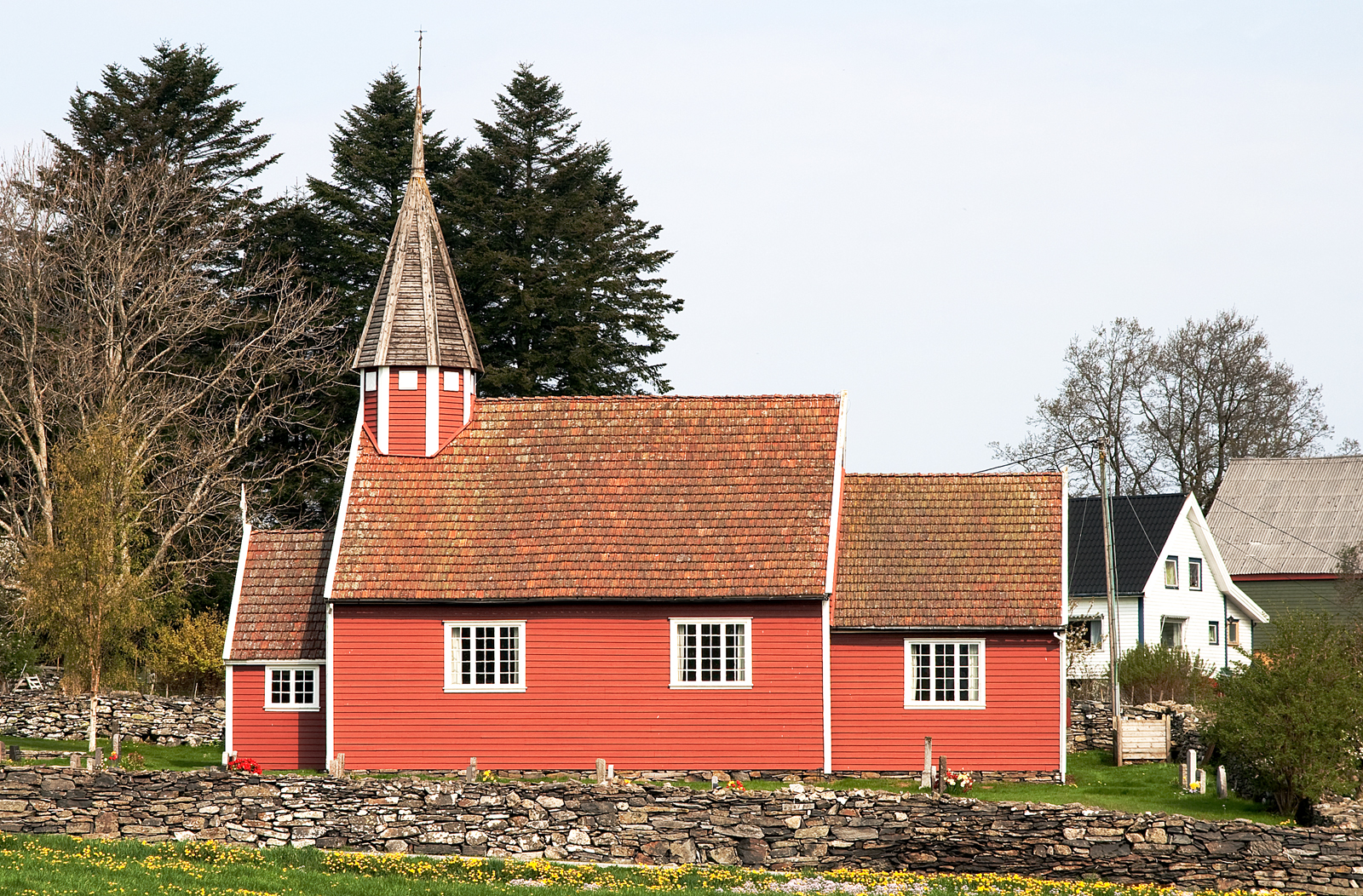
Sjernarøy Church

The parish of Finnø (later spelled Finnøy) was established as a municipality on 1 January 1838 (see formannskapsdistrikt law). It originally encompassed the islands of Finnøy, Talgje, and Fogn as well as the small surrounding islets and the southeasternmost corner of the island of Rennesøy. On 1 July 1918, the part of Finnøy Municipality located on the island of Rennesøy (population: 72) was transferred from Finnøy Municipality to the neighboring Rennesøy Municipality.

During the 1960s, there were many municipal mergers across Norway due to the work of the Schei Committee. On 1 January 1965, the following areas were merged to form a much larger Finnøy Municipality:

- all of Finnøy Municipality (population: 1,716)
- all of Sjernarøy Municipality (population: 819)
- the northeastern part of Ombo island (population: 89) from Jelsa Municipality
- the Fisterøyene islands (population: 246) from Fister Municipality

On 1 January 2020, Finnøy Municipality, Rennesøy Municipality, and Stavanger Municipality were merged into a much larger Stavanger Municipality.

=== Name ===
The municipality (originally the parish) is named after the island of Finnøy (Old Norse: Finney) since the historic Hesby Church was built there. The meaning of the first element is uncertain. It is possibly from the word finna which is the local name for Nardus stricta. Another possibility is that it comes from the old male name finni. The last element is ey which means "island".

Historically, the name of the municipality was spelled Finnø. On 3 November 1917, a royal resolution changed the spelling of the name of the municipality to Finnøy. The letter y was added to the end of the word to "Norwegianize" the name (ø is the Danish word for "island" and øy is the Norwegian word).

=== Coat of arms ===
The coat of arms was granted on 23 September 1983 and it was in use until 1 January 2020 when the municipality was dissolved. The official blazon is "Azure, a winged arrowhead argent in bend" (Norwegian: På blå grunn ei vengja sølv pil på skrå oppover). This means the arms have a blue field (background) and the charge is a winged arrowhead. The charge has a tincture of argent which means it is commonly colored white, but if it is made out of metal, then silver is used. The arms were derived from the arms of the Hestbø family (which included Ogmund Finnsson), one of the mightiest families in the area in the 14th century. They had their stronghold on their Hesby estate on the island of Finnøy in Finnøy Municipality. The arms were designed by Harald Hallstensen. The municipal flag has the same design as the coat of arms.

=== Churches ===
The Church of Norway had three parishes (sokn) within Finnøy Municipality. It was part of the Tungenes prosti (deanery) in the Diocese of Stavanger.

Churches in Finnøy Municipality
Parish (sokn)	Church name	Location of the church	Year built
Hesby	Hesby Church	Hesby on Finnøy	c. 1100
Sjernarøy	Sjernarøy Church	Kyrkjøy in Sjernarøyane islands	1647
Sjernarøy	Jørstad Church	Jørstadvågen on Ombo	1929
Talgje	Fogn Church	Fogn	1991
Talgje	Talgje Church	Talgje	c. 1100

== History ==
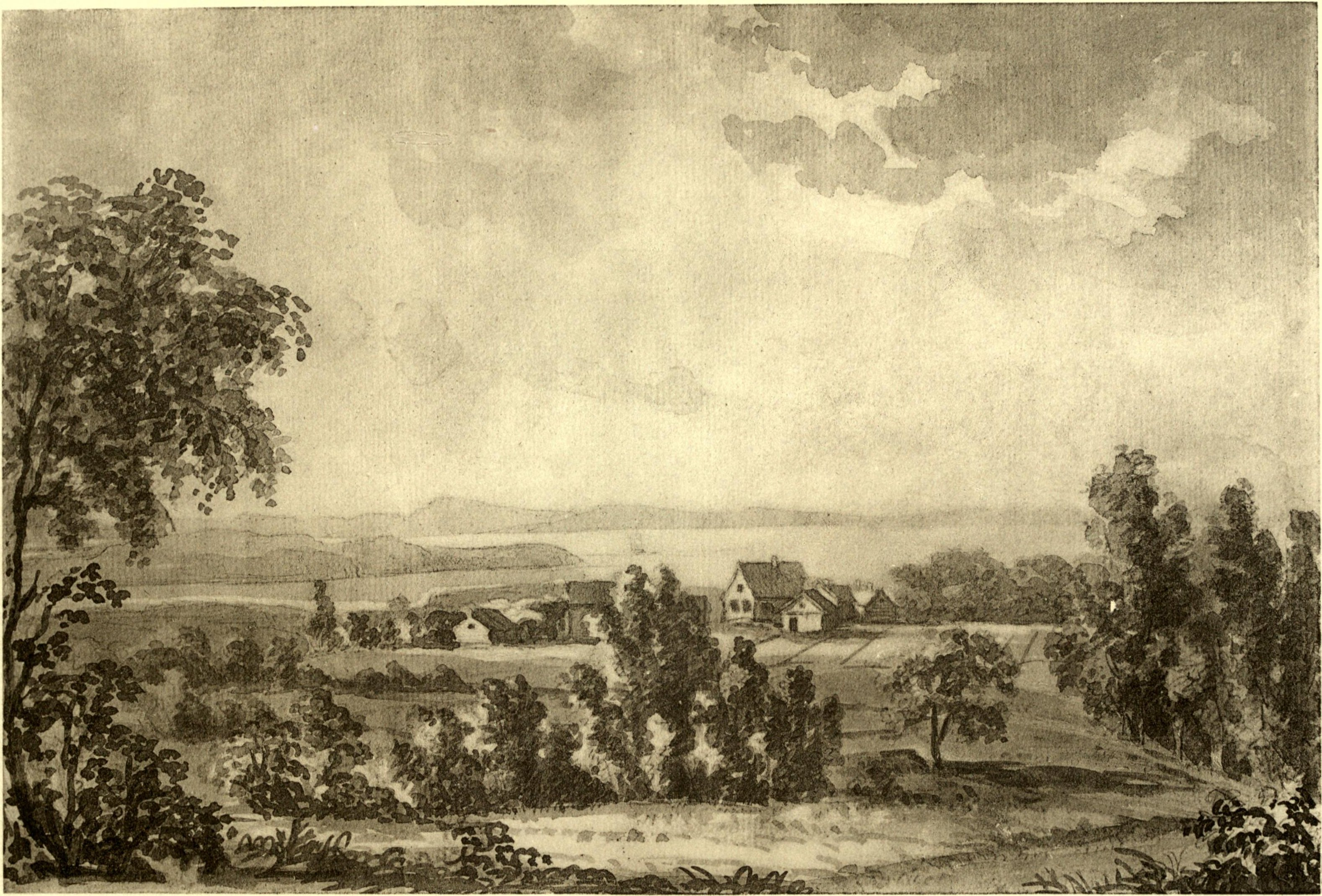
Drawing of the Finnøy prestegård

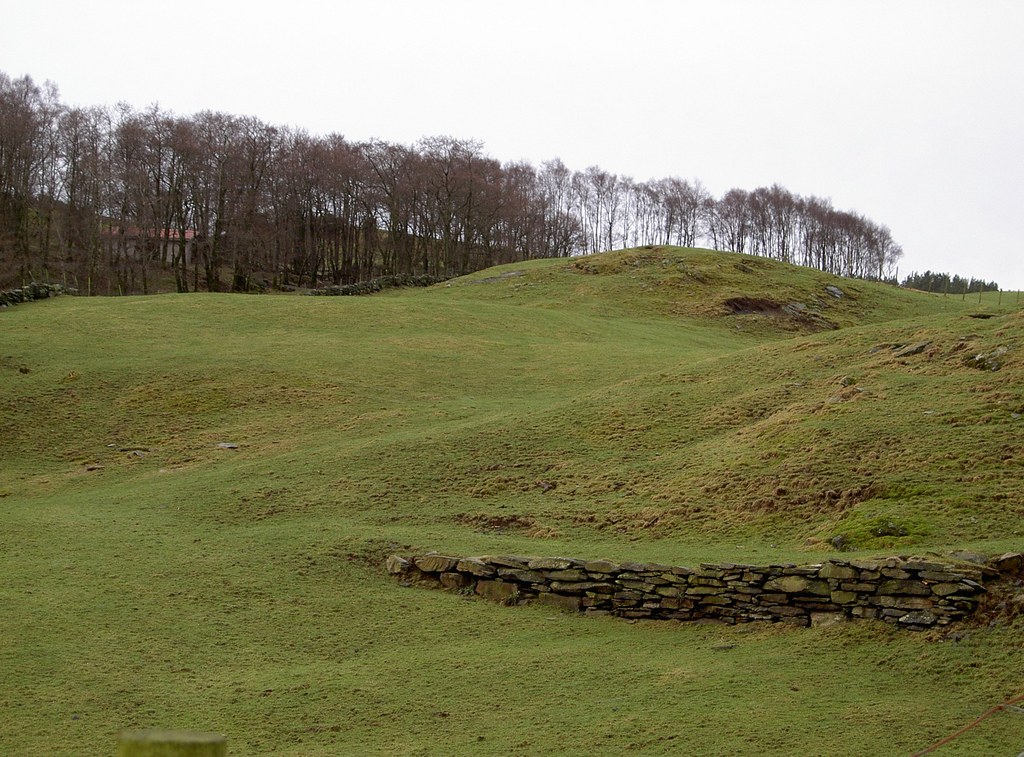
Fields on Finnøy

The island of Finnøy was at the top of its power in the middle of the fourteenth century when the King's representative Ogmund Finnsson had his seat at Hesby on the west side of the island of Finnøy. The medieval, stone Hesby Church, dating back to at least the thirteenth century, still stands at Hesby.

It is often claimed that the Norwegian mathematician Niels Henrik Abel (1802–1829) was born on Finnøy island since his father Søren Georg Abel acted as rector there. Recent studies indicates, however, that he was born in the Nedstrand Church parish located to the north of Finnøy. However, he was raised on the island of Finnøy.

== Geography ==
The island municipality of Finnøy was located on the south side of the Boknafjorden. The main islands of Finnøy included Finnøy, Talgje, Fogn, Halsnøya, Sjernarøyane, and the north and west parts of the island of Ombo. The highest point in the municipality was the 513.9-metre (1,686 ft) tall mountain Bandåsen on the island of Ombo.

The islands of Talgje and Finnøy were connected to the mainland by the undersea Finnøy Tunnel. The rest of the islands were only accessible by boats. Tysvær Municipality was located to the north, Suldal Municipality was located to the northeast, Hjelmeland Municipality was located to the east, Strand Municipality was located to the south, Rennesøy Municipality was located to the southwest, and Bokn Municipality was located to the west (across the fjord).

== Government ==
While it existed, Finnøy Municipality was responsible for primary education (through 10th grade), outpatient health services, senior citizen services, welfare and other social services, zoning, economic development, and municipal roads and utilities. The municipality was governed by a municipal council of directly elected representatives. The mayor was indirectly elected by a vote of the municipal council. The municipality was under the jurisdiction of the Ryfylke District Court and the Gulating Court of Appeal.

=== Municipal council ===
The municipal council (Kommunestyre) of Finnøy Municipality was made up of 21 representatives that were elected to four year terms. The tables below show the historical composition of the council by political party.

Finnøy kommunestyre 2015–2019
Party name (in Nynorsk)	Number of representatives
Labour Party (Arbeidarpartiet)	2
Conservative Party (Høgre)	4
Christian Democratic Party (Kristeleg Folkeparti)	6
Centre Party (Senterpartiet)	4
Liberal Party (Venstre)	5
Total number of members:	21
Note: On 1 January 2020, Finnøy Municipality became part of Stavanger Municipality.

Finnøy kommunestyre 2011–2015
Party name (in Nynorsk)	Number of representatives
Labour Party (Arbeidarpartiet)	3
Progress Party (Framstegspartiet)	1
Conservative Party (Høgre)	3
Christian Democratic Party (Kristeleg Folkeparti)	5
Centre Party (Senterpartiet)	4
Socialist Left Party (Sosialistisk Venstreparti)	1
Liberal Party (Venstre)	4
Total number of members:	21

Finnøy kommunestyre 2007–2011
Party name (in Nynorsk)	Number of representatives
Labour Party (Arbeidarpartiet)	1
Progress Party (Framstegspartiet)	2
Conservative Party (Høgre)	3
Christian Democratic Party (Kristeleg Folkeparti)	7
Centre Party (Senterpartiet)	6
Socialist Left Party (Sosialistisk Venstreparti)	1
Liberal Party (Venstre)	1
Total number of members:	21

Finnøy kommunestyre 2003–2007
Party name (in Nynorsk)	Number of representatives
Labour Party (Arbeidarpartiet)	1
Progress Party (Framstegspartiet)	2
Conservative Party (Høgre)	3
Christian Democratic Party (Kristeleg Folkeparti)	7
Centre Party (Senterpartiet)	6
Socialist Left Party (Sosialistisk Venstreparti)	1
Liberal Party (Venstre)	1
Total number of members:	21

Finnøy kommunestyre 1999–2003
Party name (in Nynorsk)	Number of representatives
Labour Party (Arbeidarpartiet)	2
Progress Party (Framstegspartiet)	1
Conservative Party (Høgre)	3
Christian Democratic Party (Kristeleg Folkeparti)	8
Centre Party (Senterpartiet)	9
Liberal Party (Venstre)	2
Total number of members:	25

Finnøy kommunestyre 1995–1999
Party name (in Nynorsk)	Number of representatives
Labour Party (Arbeidarpartiet)	2
Progress Party (Framstegspartiet)	1
Conservative Party (Høgre)	2
Christian Democratic Party (Kristeleg Folkeparti)	6
Centre Party (Senterpartiet)	12
Liberal Party (Venstre)	2
Total number of members:	25

Finnøy kommunestyre 1991–1995
Party name (in Nynorsk)	Number of representatives
Labour Party (Arbeidarpartiet)	2
Conservative Party (Høgre)	3
Christian Democratic Party (Kristeleg Folkeparti)	7
Centre Party (Senterpartiet)	11
Liberal Party (Venstre)	3
Total number of members:	25

Finnøy kommunestyre 1987–1991
Party name (in Nynorsk)	Number of representatives
Labour Party (Arbeidarpartiet)	2
Conservative Party (Høgre)	4
Christian Democratic Party (Kristeleg Folkeparti)	9
Centre Party (Senterpartiet)	8
Liberal Party (Venstre)	2
Total number of members:	25

Finnøy kommunestyre 1983–1987
Party name (in Nynorsk)	Number of representatives
Labour Party (Arbeidarpartiet)	1
Conservative Party (Høgre)	5
Christian Democratic Party (Kristeleg Folkeparti)	8
Centre Party (Senterpartiet)	9
Liberal Party (Venstre)	1
Independent list (Uavhengig liste)	1
Total number of members:	25

Finnøy kommunestyre 1979–1983
Party name (in Nynorsk)	Number of representatives
Labour Party (Arbeidarpartiet)	1
Conservative Party (Høgre)	6
Christian Democratic Party (Kristeleg Folkeparti)	9
Centre Party (Senterpartiet)	8
Liberal Party (Venstre)	1
Total number of members:	25

Finnøy kommunestyre 1975–1979
Party name (in Nynorsk)	Number of representatives
Labour Party (Arbeidarpartiet)	1
Conservative Party (Høgre)	3
Christian Democratic Party (Kristeleg Folkeparti)	10
Centre Party (Senterpartiet)	10
Local list (Bygdelista)	1
Total number of members:	25

Finnøy kommunestyre 1971–1975
Party name (in Nynorsk)	Number of representatives
Labour Party (Arbeidarpartiet)	1
Conservative Party (Høgre)	2
Christian Democratic Party (Kristeleg Folkeparti)	8
Centre Party (Senterpartiet)	10
Local List(s) (Lokale lister)	4
Total number of members:	25

Finnøy kommunestyre 1967–1971
Party name (in Nynorsk)	Number of representatives
Labour Party (Arbeidarpartiet)	1
Conservative Party (Høgre)	2
Christian Democratic Party (Kristeleg Folkeparti)	7
Centre Party (Senterpartiet)	10
Liberal Party (Venstre)	5
Total number of members:	25

Finnøy kommunestyre 1963–1967
Party name (in Nynorsk)	Number of representatives
Local List(s) (Lokale lister)	17
Total number of members:	17

Finnøy heradsstyre 1959–1963
Party name (in Nynorsk)	Number of representatives
Centre Party (Senterpartiet)	13
Local List(s) (Lokale lister)	4
Total number of members:	17

Finnøy heradsstyre 1955–1959
Party name (in Nynorsk)	Number of representatives
Local List(s) (Lokale lister)	17
Total number of members:	17

Finnøy heradsstyre 1951–1955
Party name (in Nynorsk)	Number of representatives
Local List(s) (Lokale lister)	17
Total number of members:	17

Finnøy heradsstyre 1947–1951
Party name (in Nynorsk)	Number of representatives
Local List(s) (Lokale lister)	16
Total number of members:	16

Finnøy heradsstyre 1945–1947
Party name (in Nynorsk)	Number of representatives
Local List(s) (Lokale lister)	16
Total number of members:	16

Finnøy heradsstyre 1937–1941*
Party name (in Nynorsk)	Number of representatives
Local List(s) (Lokale lister)	16
Total number of members:	16
Note: Due to the German occupation of Norway during World War II, no elections were held for new municipal councils until after the war ended in 1945.

=== Mayors ===
The mayor (Nynorsk: ordførar) of Finnøy Municipality was the political leader of the municipality and the chairperson of the municipal council. The following people have held this position:

- 1838–1843: Ole Christian Selvaag
- 1844–1851: Thormod Asgoutsen Regelstad
- 1852–1853: Erik Sørensen Faae
- 1854–1857: Svend Olsen Gjesdahl
- 1858–1859: Ole Schavland
- 1860–1861: Nils Nilsen Ladsteen
- 1862–1869: Ole Schavland
- 1870–1873: Rasmus Asgoutsen Nordbø
- 1874–1877: Ole Schavland
- 1878–1893: Asgout Eriksen Steennæs
- 1894–1901: Erik E. Steennæs
- 1902–1904: Gudtorm Lauvsnæs
- 1905–1907: Nils M. Ladstein
- 1908–1913: Gudtorm Lauvsnæs
- 1914–1942: Asseus Steinnes
- 1943–1945: Einar M. Hviding
- 1945–1955: Bellest Vestbø
- 1955–1959: Kasper Mjølsnes
- 1959–1971: Nils Ladstein Vestbø
- 1971–1979: Petter Nærland (Sp)
- 1979–1983: Johannes Løyning (H)
- 1983–1987: Kjell Vastveit (Sp)
- 1987–1991: Sigurd Risa (KrF)
- 1991–2007: Jorunn Strand Vestbø (Sp)
- 2007–2011: Kjell Nes (KrF)
- 2011–2015: Gro Skartveit (V)
- 2015–2019: Henrik Halleland (KrF)

== Notable people ==
- Torolf Nordbø (also known as Han Innante), a Norwegian musician and comedian

== See also ==
- List of former municipalities of Norway
