= Finnøya =

Finnøya or Finnøy may refer to:

== Places ==
=== Norway ===
- Finnøy Municipality, a former municipality in Rogaland county
- Finnøy (island), an island in Stavanger Municipality, Rogaland county
- Finnøya, Agder, an island in Risør Municipality, Agder county
- Finnøya, Bø, an island in Bø Municipality, Nordland county
- Finnøya, Finnmark, an island in Hammerfest Municipality, Finnmark county
- Finnøya, Møre og Romsdal, an island in Ålesund Municipality, Møre og Romsdal county
- Finnøya, Nordland, an island in Hamarøy Municipality, Nordland county
- Finnøy, Stavanger, a borough in the large Stavanger Municipality in Rogaland county
- Finnøya, Vågan, an island in Vågan Municipality, Nordland county

== Other ==
- Finnøy Tunnel, an undersea road tunnel in Rogaland county, Norway
