= Judaberg =

Village in Stavanger Municipality, Norway

- Village
- Interactive map of Judaberg
- Coordinates: 59.17213°N 5.87576°E
- Country: Norway
- Region: Western Norway
- County: Rogaland
- District: Ryfylke
- Municipality: Stavanger Municipality

Area
  - Total: 0.79 km^{2} (0.31 sq mi)
- Elevation: 4 m (13 ft)

Population (2025)
  - Total: 936
  - Density: 1,185/km^{2} (3,070/sq mi)
- Time zone: UTC+01:00 (CET)
  - Summer (DST): UTC+02:00 (CEST)
- Post Code: 4160 Finnøy

Judaberg is a village in Stavanger Municipality in Rogaland county, Norway. The village is located on the eastern shore of the island of Finnøy. The island is located on the south side of the Boknafjorden, northeast of the large city of Stavanger.

The 0.79-square-kilometre (200-acre) village has a population (2025) of 936 and a population density of 1,185 inhabitants per square kilometre (3,070/sq mi). Judaberg is the commercial centre of the eastern part of Stavanger Municipality with several small industries as well as shopping. The Rygjabø upper secondary school, the only high school in eastern Stavanger is located here. The newspaper Øyposten has been published in Judaberg since 1999.

Judaberg is a transportation hub of the local islands with several ferry routes connecting to all the surrounding islands such as Ombo, Sjernarøyane, Halsnøya, and Fogn as well as to the village of Nedstrand on the mainland. There is also high speed ferry service to the city of Stavanger. Judaberg is connected to the mainland by road by a series of bridges and undersea tunnels including the Finnøy Tunnel, Mastrafjord Tunnel, and Byfjord Tunnel.

== History ==
The village was the administrative centre of the old Finnøy Municipality until 1 January 2020 when Finnøy Municipality was merged into Stavanger Municipality.
