= Ombo =

Island in Rogaland, Norway

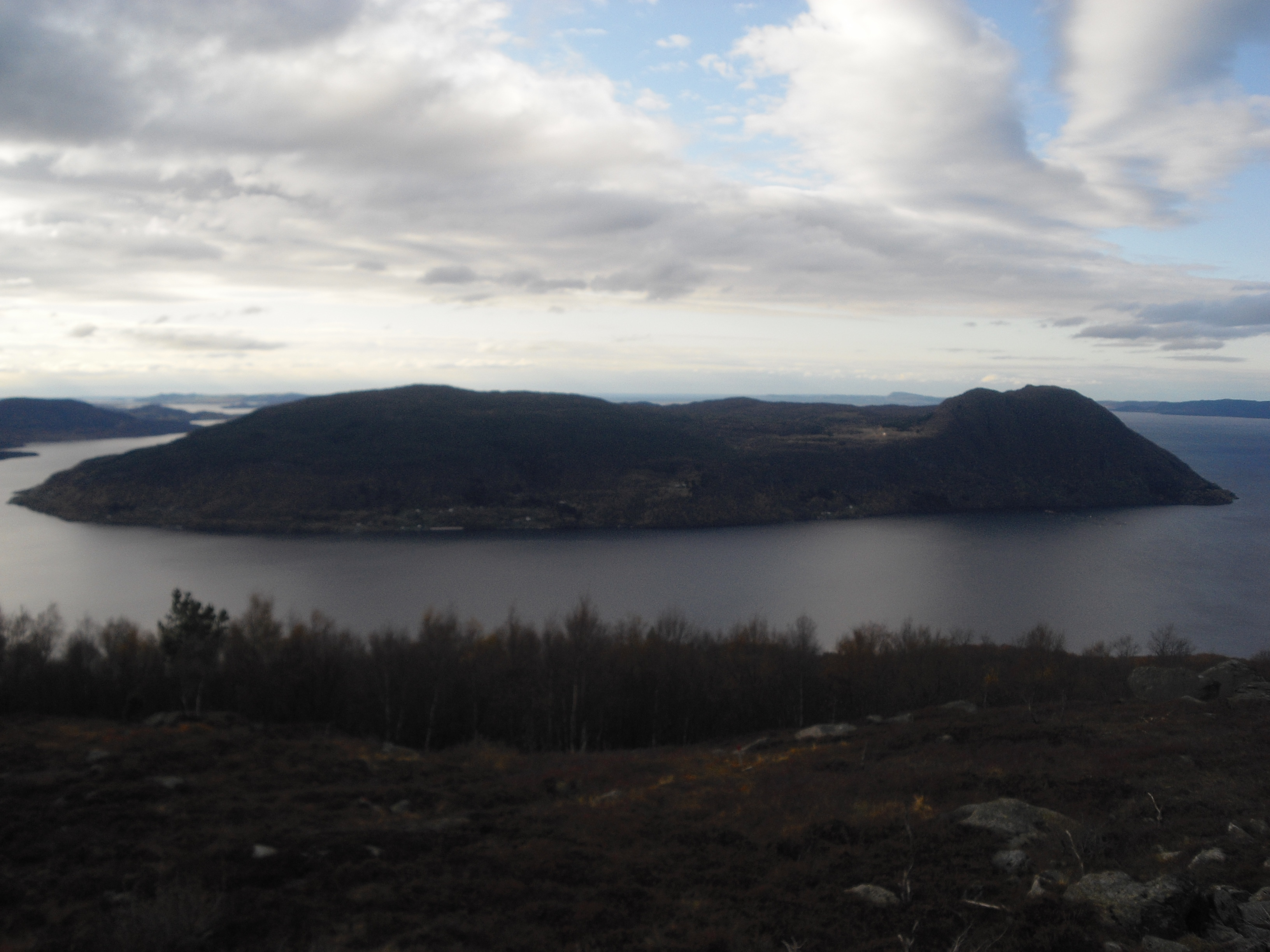
- View of Ombo from Jøsneset in Hjelmeland Municipality
- Interactive map of the island

Geography
- Location: Rogaland, Norway
- Coordinates: 59.25743°N 6.00142°E
- Area: 58 km^{2} (22 sq mi)
- Length: 9.7 km (6.03 mi)
- Width: 6.5 km (4.04 mi)
- Highest elevation: 513 m (1683 ft)
- Highest point: Bandåsen

Administration
- Norway
- County: Rogaland
- Municipality: Stavanger Municipality

Demographics
- Population: 233 (2022)
- Pop. density: 4.2/km^{2} (10.9/sq mi)

Ombo is an island in Stavanger Municipality in Rogaland county, Norway. The 58-square-kilometre (22 sq mi) island is the largest island in the Ryfylke region and the second largest island in Rogaland county. In 2022, there were 233 people living on the island.

There are several villages on the island, including Jørstadvåg, where Jørstad Church is located, Atlatveit, and Eidssund in the western part of the island and the villages of Tuftene, Skipavik, Skår, and Vestersjø are located on the southeastern part of the island. The island is the northeastern most part of the vast Stavanger Municipality, nearly 40 kilometres (25 mi) from the city of Stavanger, the administrative centre of the municipality.

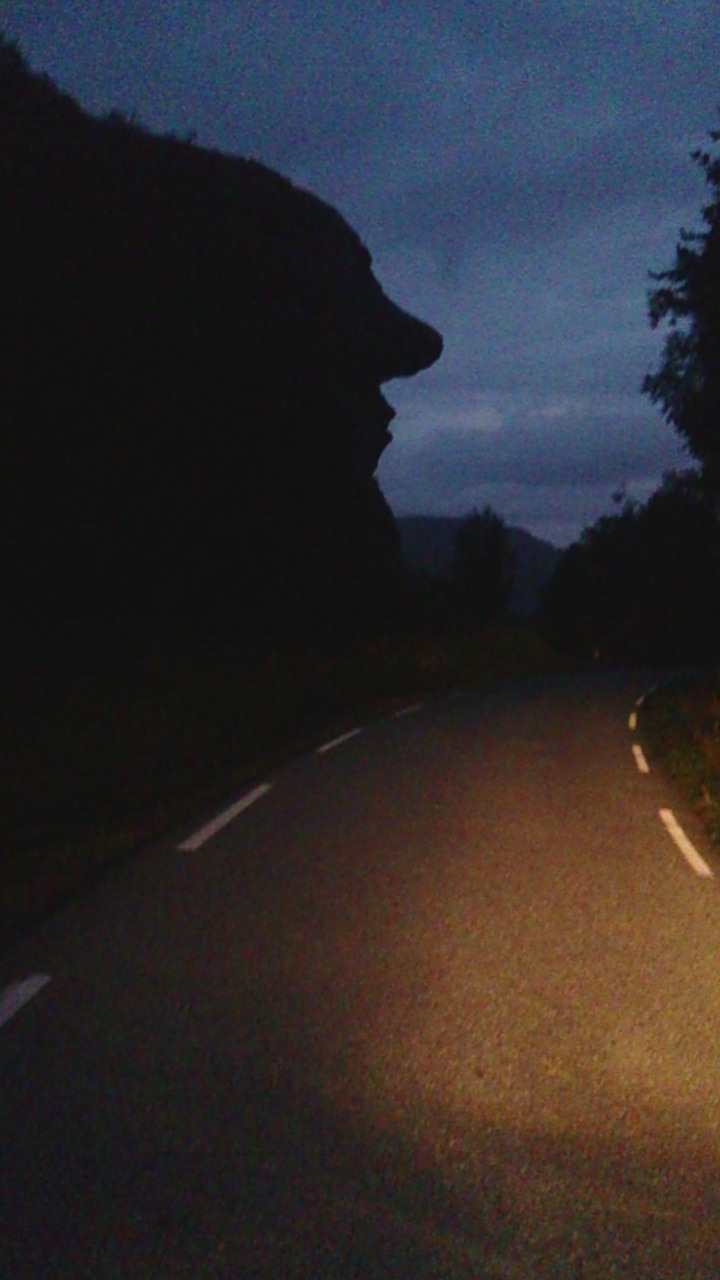
View of the Ombo-gubben rock formation

There are no outside road connections to Ombo—it is only accessible by boat. There are regular ferry connections that stop at Eidssund on the west coast from Judaberg, Sjernarøyane, Nedstrand, Jelsa, Halsnøya, and Fogn. There are also regular ferry connections from Skipavik on the eastern shore of the island to Nesvik and Hjelmeland on the mainland.

Ombo is located north of the islands of Randøy and Halsnøya, northeast of the island of Finnøy, and east of the Sjernarøyane archipelago. The highest point on the island is the 515-metre (1,690 ft) tall Bandåsen. Ombo is surrounded by fjords that are connected to the main Boknafjorden. The Ombofjorden to the east, Gardssundfjorden to the south, Gapafjorden to the west, and Jelsafjorden to the north.

After the road was built around the island of Ombo, a distinctive rock formation was visible from the new road. The rock formation looks like a face, and was originally named Adam. Among the local residents, this is also called "Ombo-gubben".

== History ==
When municipalities were established in Norway on 1 January 1838, the island was divided three ways: the western third was part of Nedstrand Municipality, the northeastern third was part of Jelsa Municipality, and the southeastern third was part of Hjelmeland Municipality. In 1868, the Nedstrand area became part of the new Sjernarøy Municipality. In 1965, the parts of Ombo belonging to Sjernarøy Municipality and Jelsa Municipality became part of a newly-enlarged Finnøy Municipality. On 1 January 2020, the whole island became part of the newly-enlarged Stavanger Municipality.

== See also ==
- List of islands of Norway
