= Torolf Nordbø =

Norwegian musician and comedian

Torolf Nordbø (born 31 December 1956), alias Han Innante, is a Norwegian musician and comedian from Finnøy. The oldest child in a large family, Torolf is best known for his comedy acts on Norwegian radio and TV. Torolf has also toured with several of his revues. He has released five CDs and three DVDs.

In 2005, Torolf received the Rogaland Mållag award for his "Radio Innante".

== Discography ==
This is a discography of Torolf Nordbø's CD albums.

- Magalaust (1998)
- Sjur, eg trur me snur (vol 2) (2000)
- Han Innante i Søren (vol 3) (2002)
- Han Innantes juli- og jule-CD (vol 4 1/2) (2005)
- Bakpå-lente ting (2007)

== Revues on DVD ==
- På bedringens rand (2004)
- I to-takt med tiden (2005)
