= Randøy Bridge =

Randøy Bridge Randøy bru
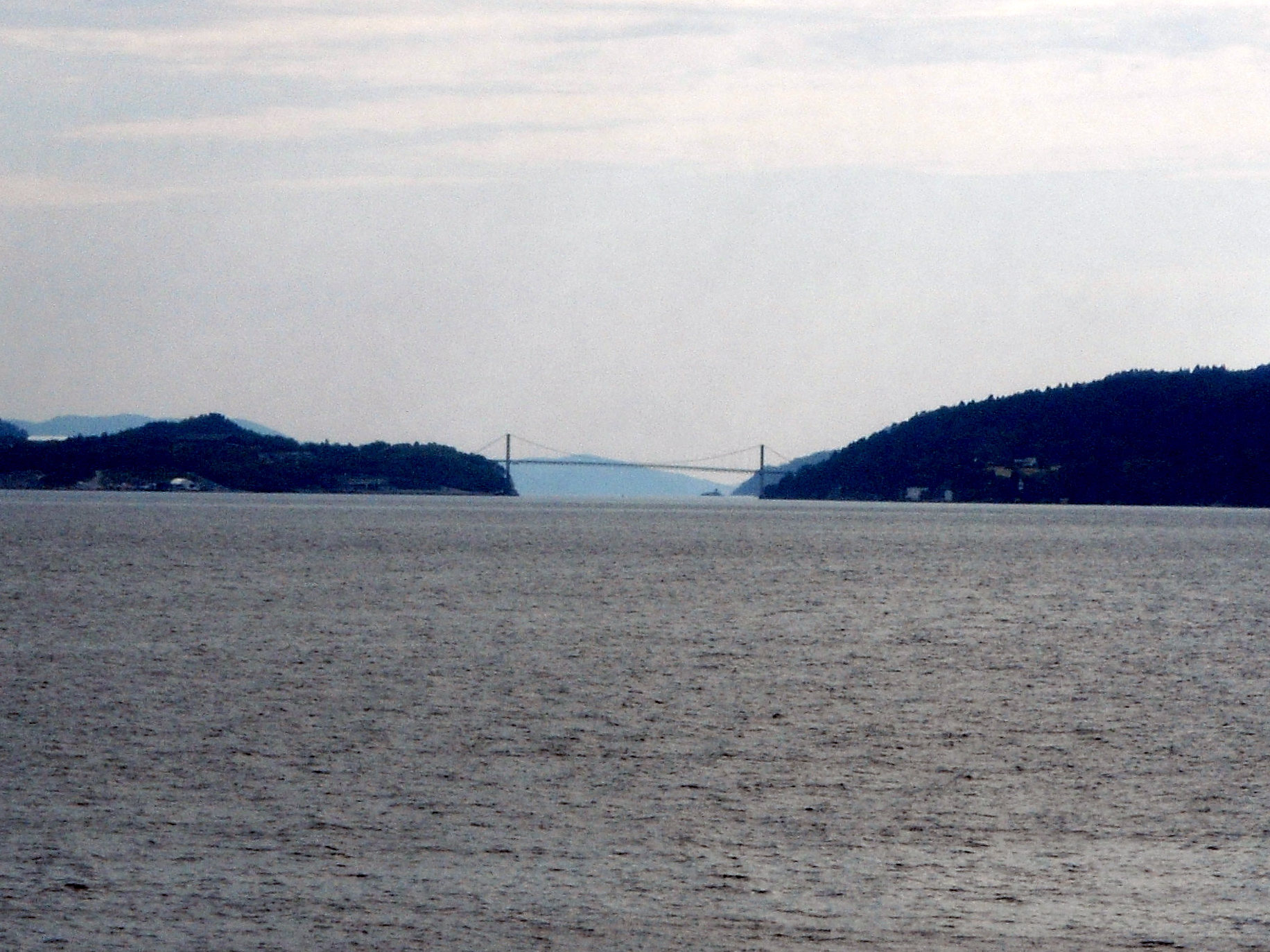
- View of the bridge
- Coordinates: 59.2176°N 6.0993°E
- Carries: Fv650
- Crosses: Ølesundet
- Locale: Hjelmeland Municipality

Characteristics
- Design: Suspension Bridge
- Total length: 202 metres (663 ft)
- Longest span: 202 metres (663 ft)

History
- Opened: 1976

Location
- Interactive map of Randøy Bridge

Randøy Bridge is a suspension bridge in Hjelmeland Municipality in Rogaland county, Norway. The bridge crosses the Ølesundet strait and links the island of Randøy to the mainland. The bridge has a main span of 202 metres (663 ft). The bridge opened in 1976 as part of County Road Fv650. The bridge is located 4.5 kilometres (2.8 mi) southwest of the village of Hjelmelandsvågen and about the same distance northeast of the village of Fister.
