= Randøy =

Island in Rogaland, Norway

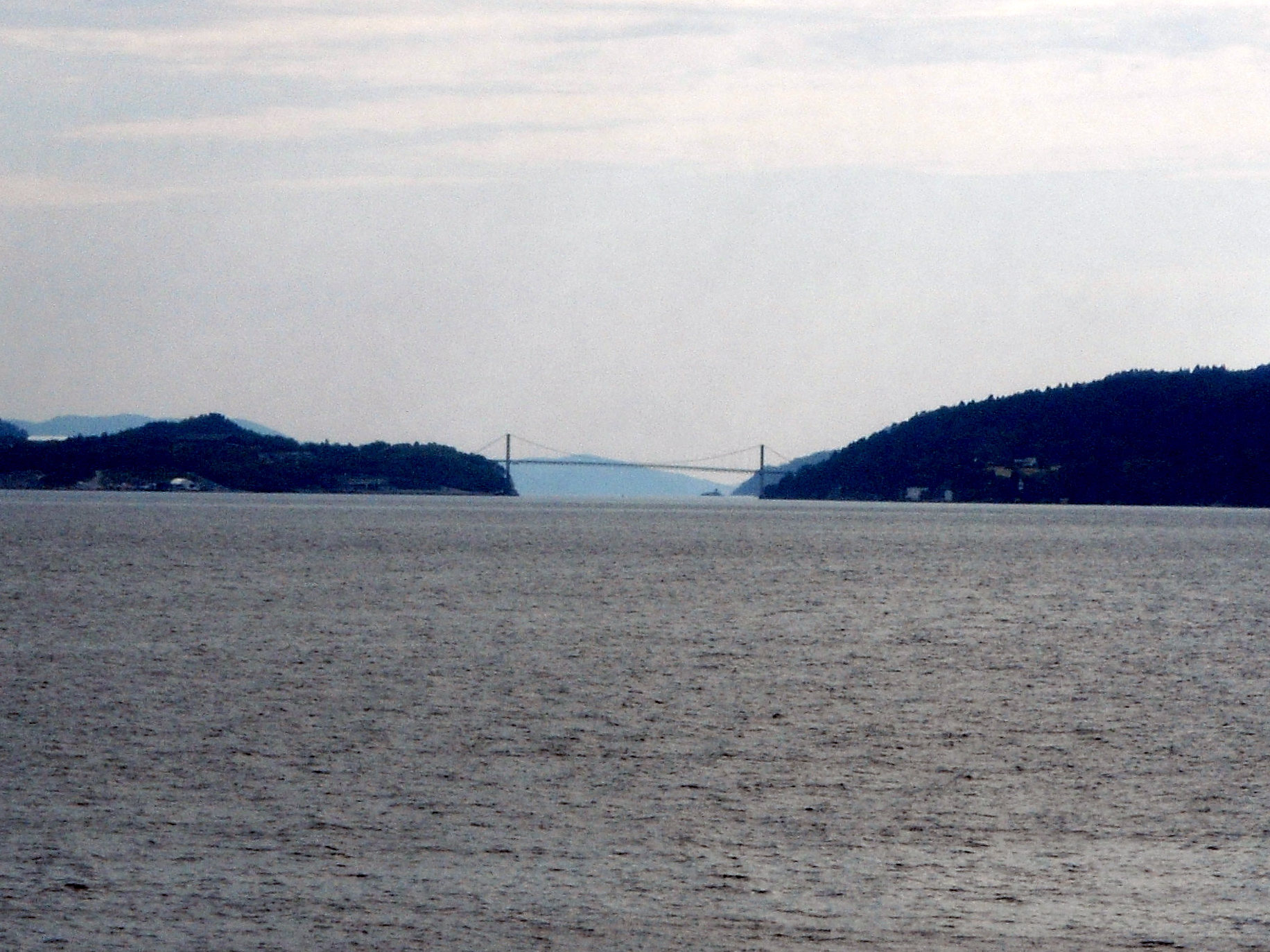
- View of the Randøy Bridge which connects Randøy to the mainland.
- Interactive map of the island

Geography
- Location: Rogaland, Norway
- Coordinates: 59.2089°N 6.03642°E
- Area: 16.7 km^{2} (6.4 sq mi)
- Length: 7.5 km (4.66 mi)
- Width: 4 km (2.5 mi)
- Highest elevation: 373 m (1224 ft)
- Highest point: Randåsen

Administration
- Norway
- County: Rogaland
- Municipality: Hjelmeland Municipality

Demographics
- Population: 210 (2014)
- Pop. density: 12.6/km^{2} (32.6/sq mi)

Randøy is an island in Hjelmeland Municipality in Rogaland county, Norway. The 16.7-square-kilometre (6.4 sq mi) island lies just off the mainland between the Jøsenfjorden and the Årdalsfjorden. The large island of Ombo lies to the north and the island of Halsnøya lies to the west.

The highest point on the island is the 373-metre (1,224 ft) tall mountain, Randåsen. The island is relatively flat in the south and it is more mountainous and forested in the central and northern regions. The island is known for its rich flora. An important industry on the island is fish farming.

The island is connected to the mainland by the Randøy Bridge. There are regular ferry connections from the island to Fister, Hjelmelandsvågen, and the island of Ombo.

== See also ==
- List of islands of Norway
