= Jørstad Church =

Church in Rogaland, Norway

- Jørstad kyrkje
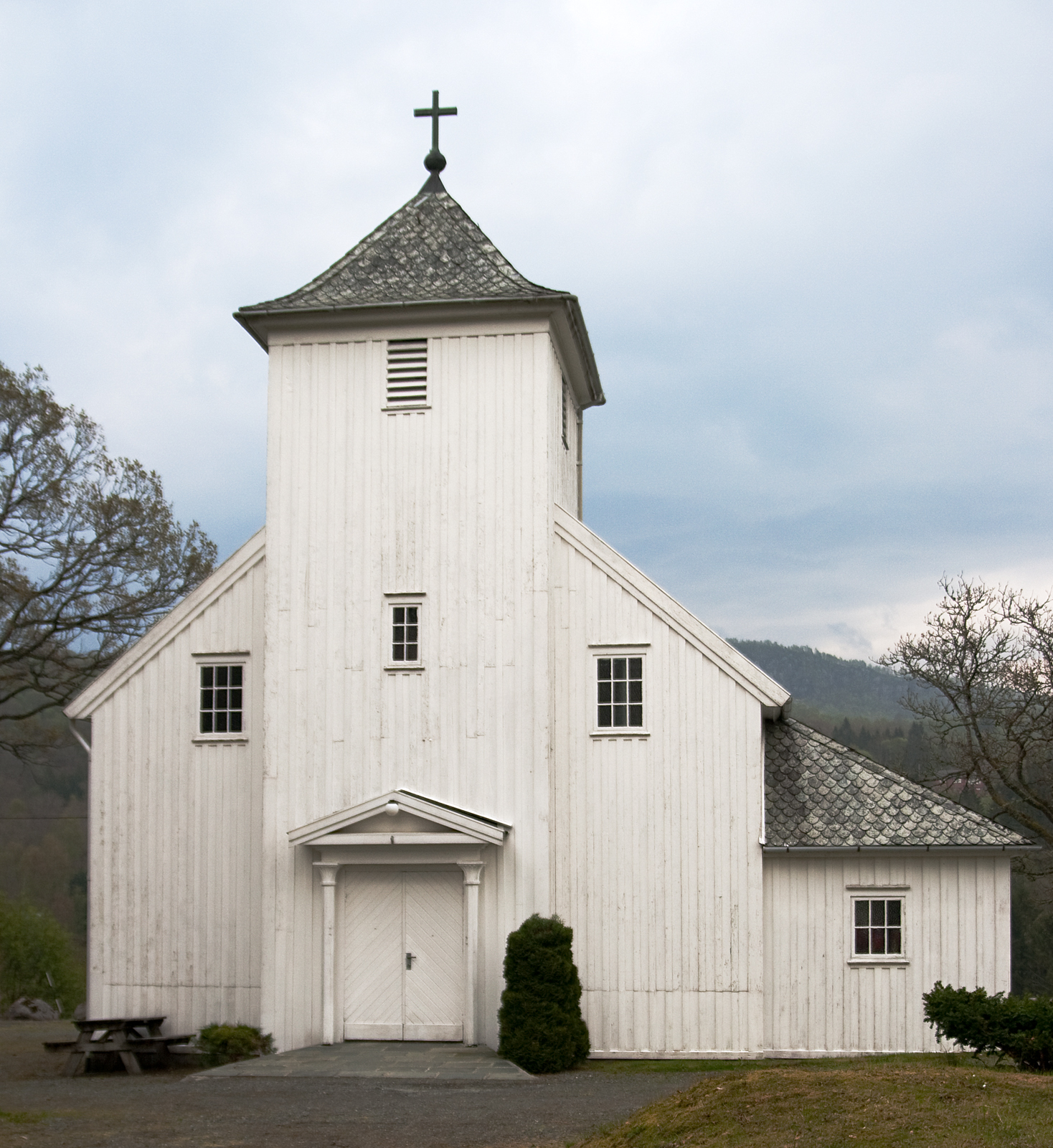
- View of the church
- Jørstad Church
- 59.27645°N 5.95566°E
- Location: Stavanger Municipality, Rogaland
- Country: Norway
- Denomination: Church of Norway
- Churchmanship: Evangelical Lutheran

History
- Status: Chapel
- Founded: 1929
- Consecrated: 1929

Architecture
- Functional status: Active
- Architect: Gustav Helland
- Architectural type: Long church
- Completed: 1929

Specifications
- Capacity: 150
- Materials: Wood

Administration
- Diocese: Stavanger bispedømme
- Deanery: Tungenes prosti
- Parish: Sjernarøy
- Norwegian Cultural Heritage Site
- Type: Church
- Status: Not protected
- ID: 84752

Jørstad Church (Norwegian: Jørstad kirke) is a chapel of the Church of Norway in the northern part of the large Stavanger Municipality in Rogaland county, Norway. It is located in the village of Jørstadvågen on the island of Ombo. It is an annex chapel in the Sjernarøy parish which is part of the Tungenes prosti (deanery) in the Diocese of Stavanger. The white, wooden church was built in a long church style in 1929 using designs by the architect Gustav Helland. The church seats about 150 people.

== See also ==
- List of churches in Rogaland
