= Hesby =

Village in Rogaland, Norway

Coordinates: 59.175°N 5.815°E

Hesby is a village in the Norwegian island of Finnøy in Rogaland county, on the western coast of Norway. Hesby is a historical seat of power dating back to the Middle Ages. It is also the site of Hesby Church, which dates back to around the year 1250 A.D.
