= Talgje Church =

Church in Rogaland, Norway

- Talgje kyrkje
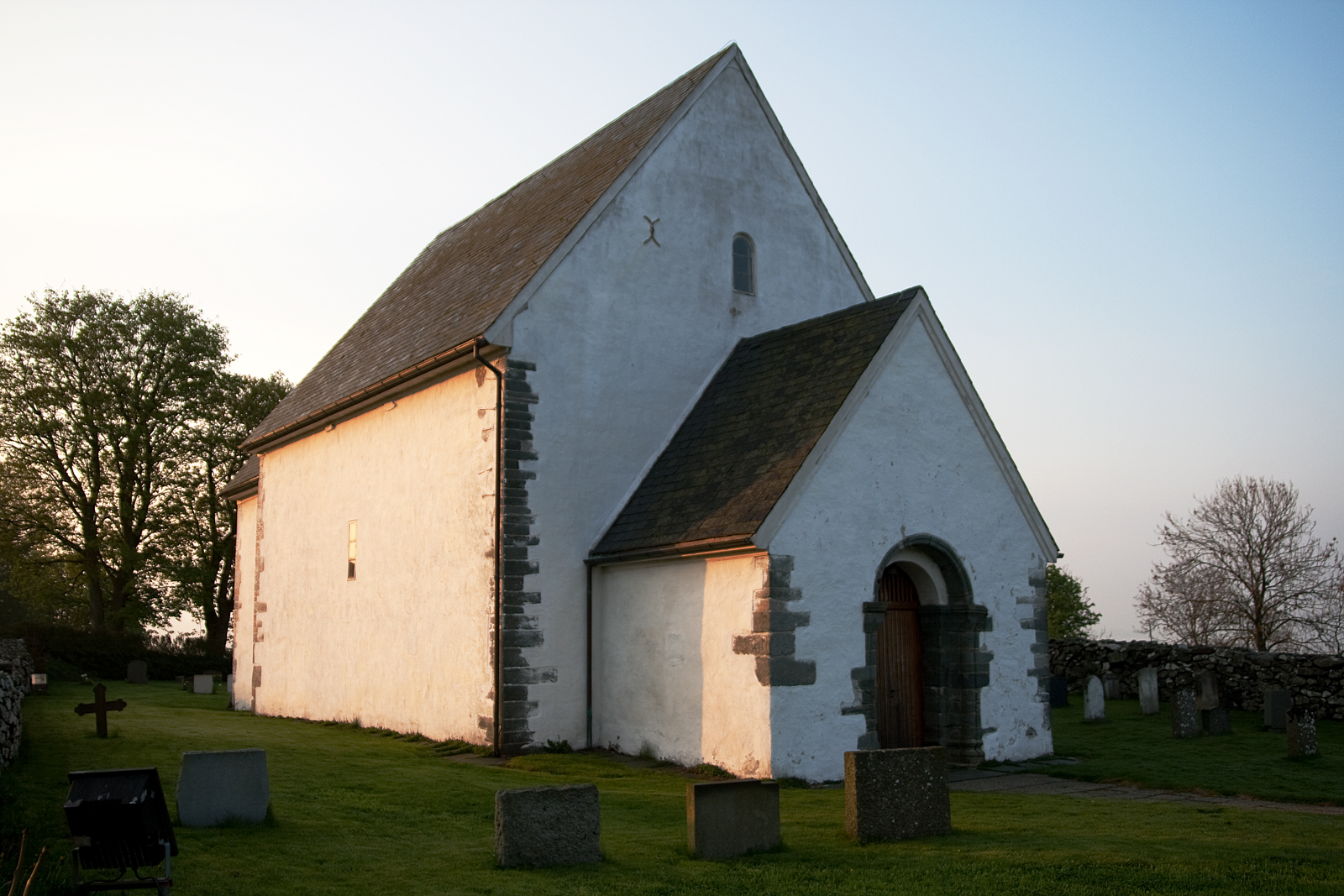
- View of the church
- Talgje Church
- 59.10627°N 5.84148°E
- Location: Stavanger Municipality, Rogaland
- Country: Norway
- Denomination: Church of Norway
- Previous denomination: Catholic Church
- Churchmanship: Evangelical Lutheran

History
- Status: Parish church
- Founded: c. 1140
- Dedication: Virgin Mary

Architecture
- Functional status: Active
- Architectural type: Long church
- Completed: c. 1140

Specifications
- Capacity: 126
- Materials: Stone

Administration
- Diocese: Stavanger bispedømme
- Deanery: Tungenes prosti
- Parish: Talgje
- Norwegian Cultural Heritage Site
- Type: Church
- Status: Automatically protected
- ID: 85069

Talgje Church (Norwegian: Talgje kyrkje) is a parish church of the Church of Norway in the large Stavanger Municipality in Rogaland county, Norway. It is located on the island of Talgje. It is one of the two churches for the Talgje parish which is part of the Tungenes prosti (deanery) in the Diocese of Stavanger. The old, stone church was built in a long church design around the year 1100 using designs by an unknown architect. The church seats about 126 people. The church is dedicated to the Virgin Mary.

== History ==
The earliest existing historical records of the church date back to the year 1280, but the church was likely built around the year 1140. The church was located on the farm Garå or Gardå on the island of Talgje. The church has a rectangular nave and a narrower, rectangular chancel with a stone apse. Originally, the church probably had a tower on the west end. The church was built as part of a large estate on Talgje. The estate was owned by old Norwegian nobility throughout the Middle Ages. Gaute Erlingsson owned the estate for a time.

During a renovation and restoration in 1870, the south portal of the nave was moved to a newly built porch in the west and made wider. The chancel arch is the only one in Rogaland that is still intact. Before the restoration, there was a long runic inscription on the south wall that told who had the church built and that a charitable foundation had also been established, probably a hospital. Until 1840, the ruins of a rectangular stone building, possibly from the 13th century, were located just east of the church and they may have been (2nd generation of) such a hospital.

== Media gallery ==
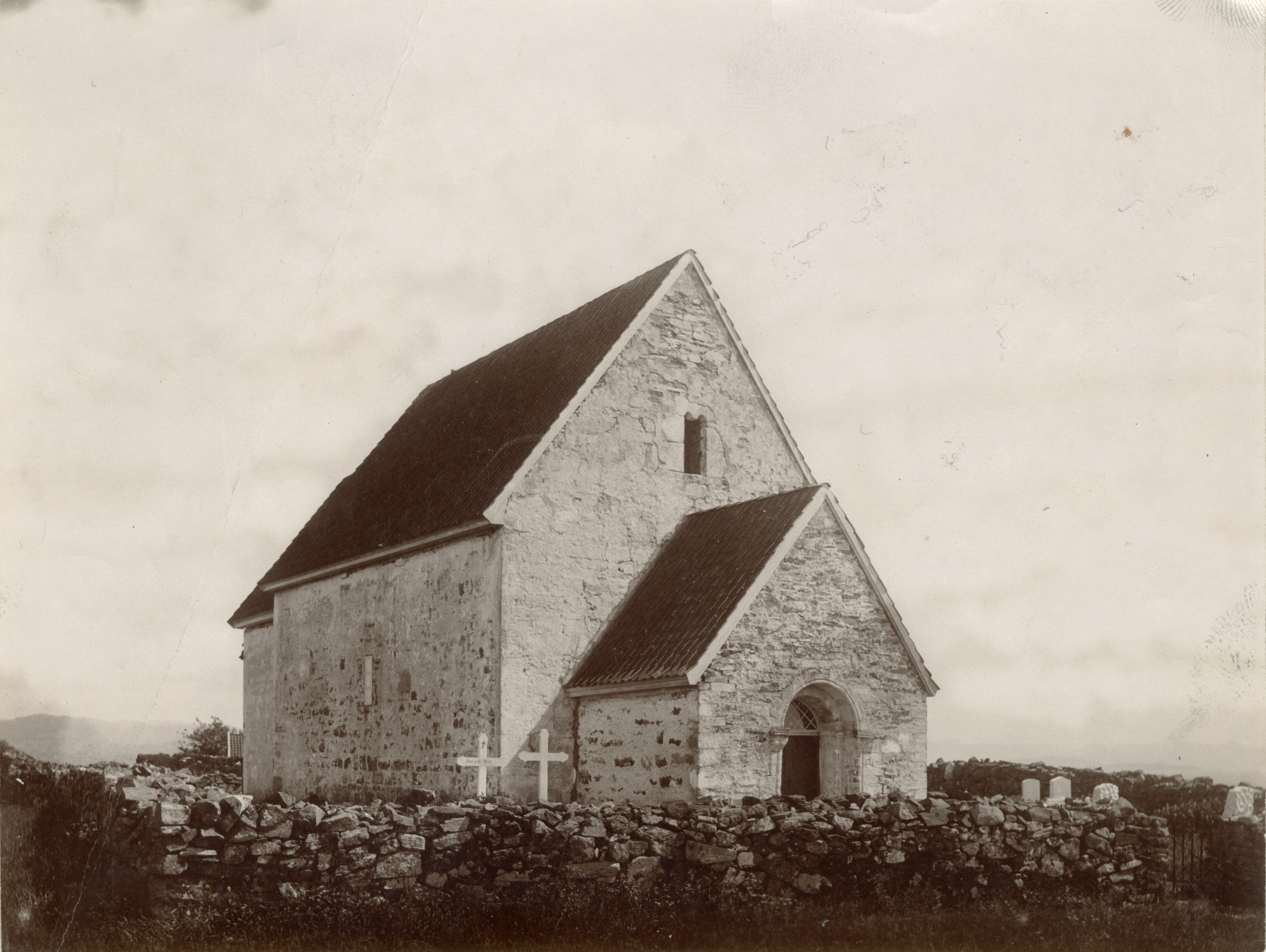

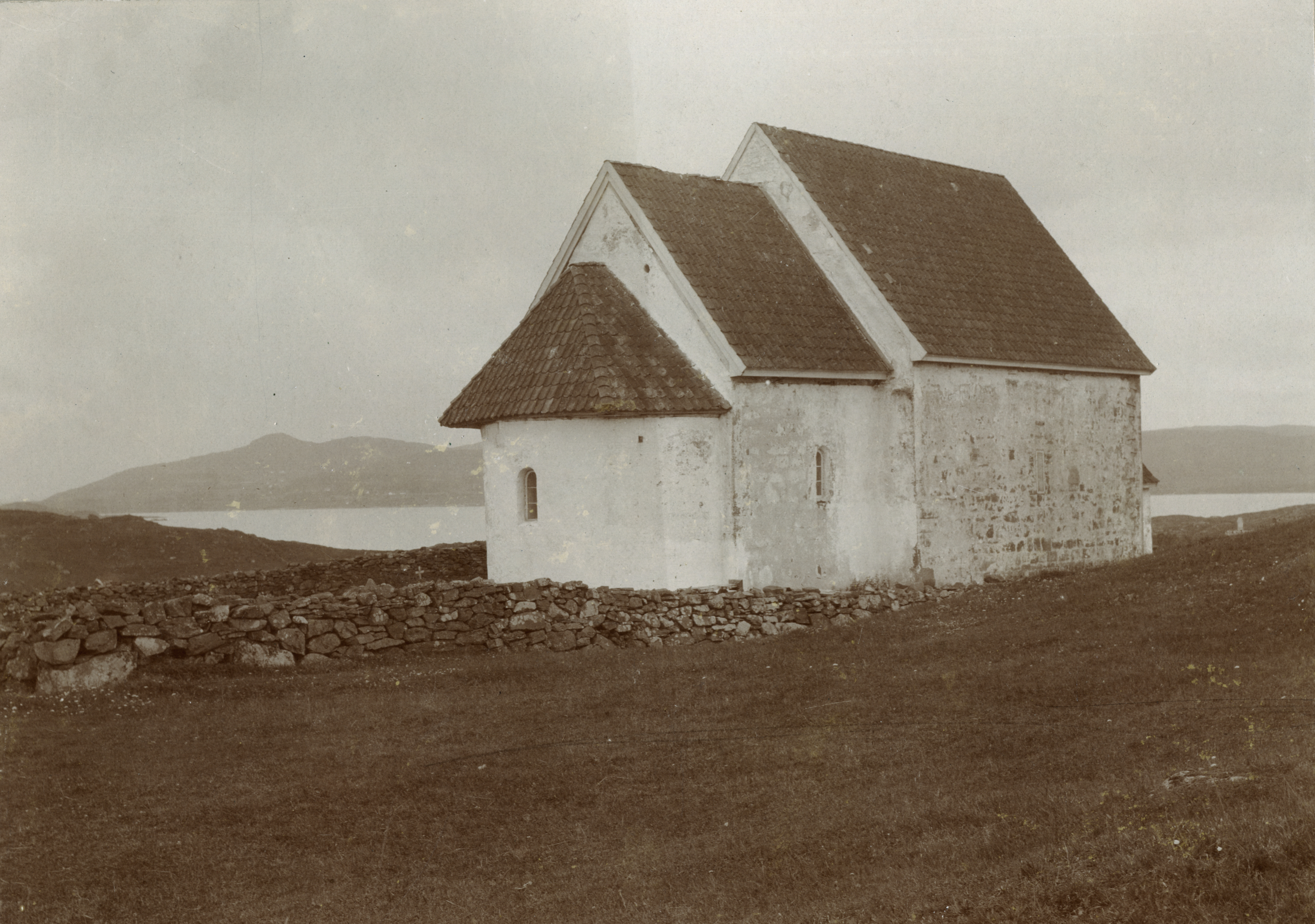

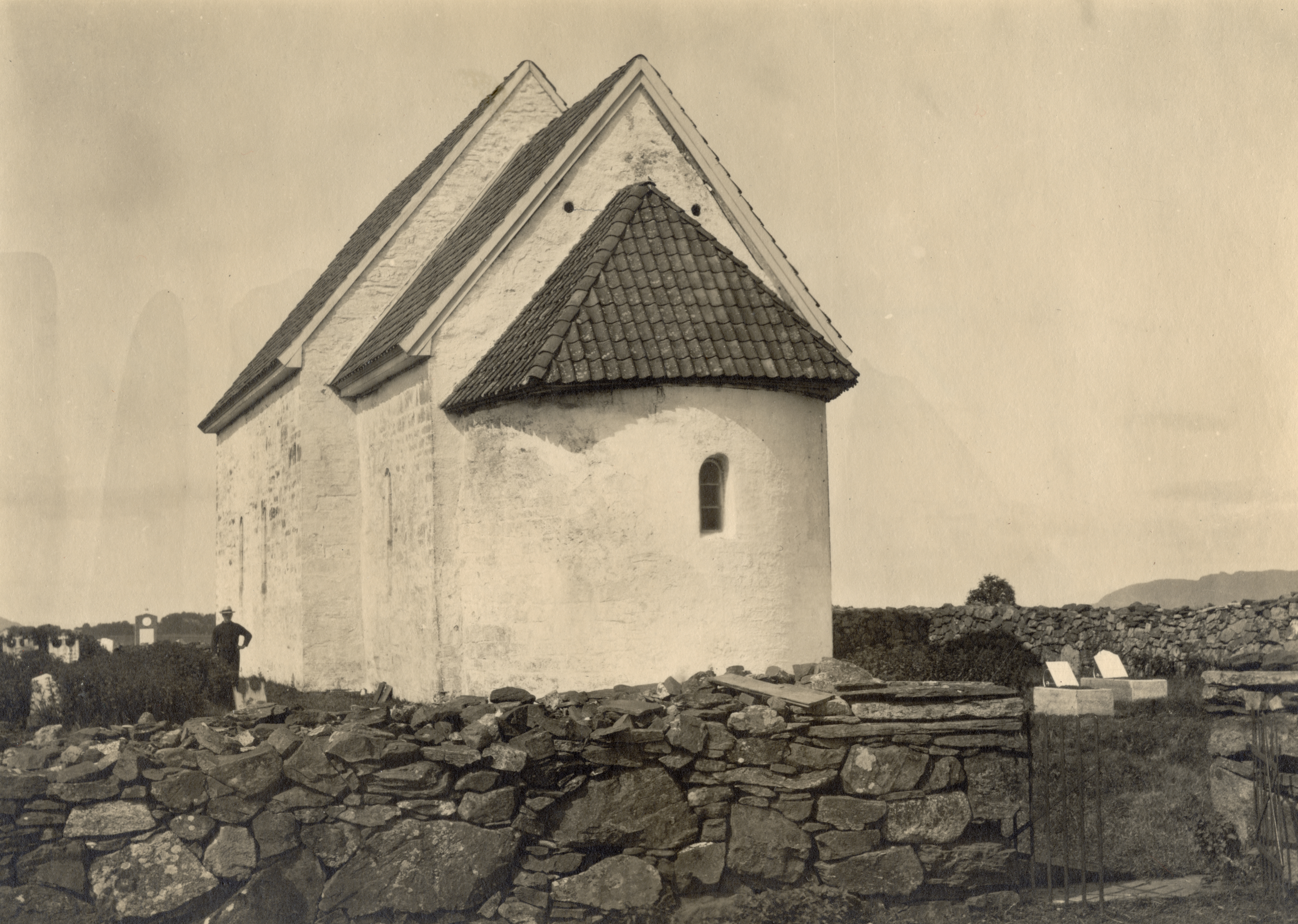

== See also ==
- List of churches in Rogaland
