= Hesby Church =

Church in Rogaland, Norway

- Hesby kyrkje
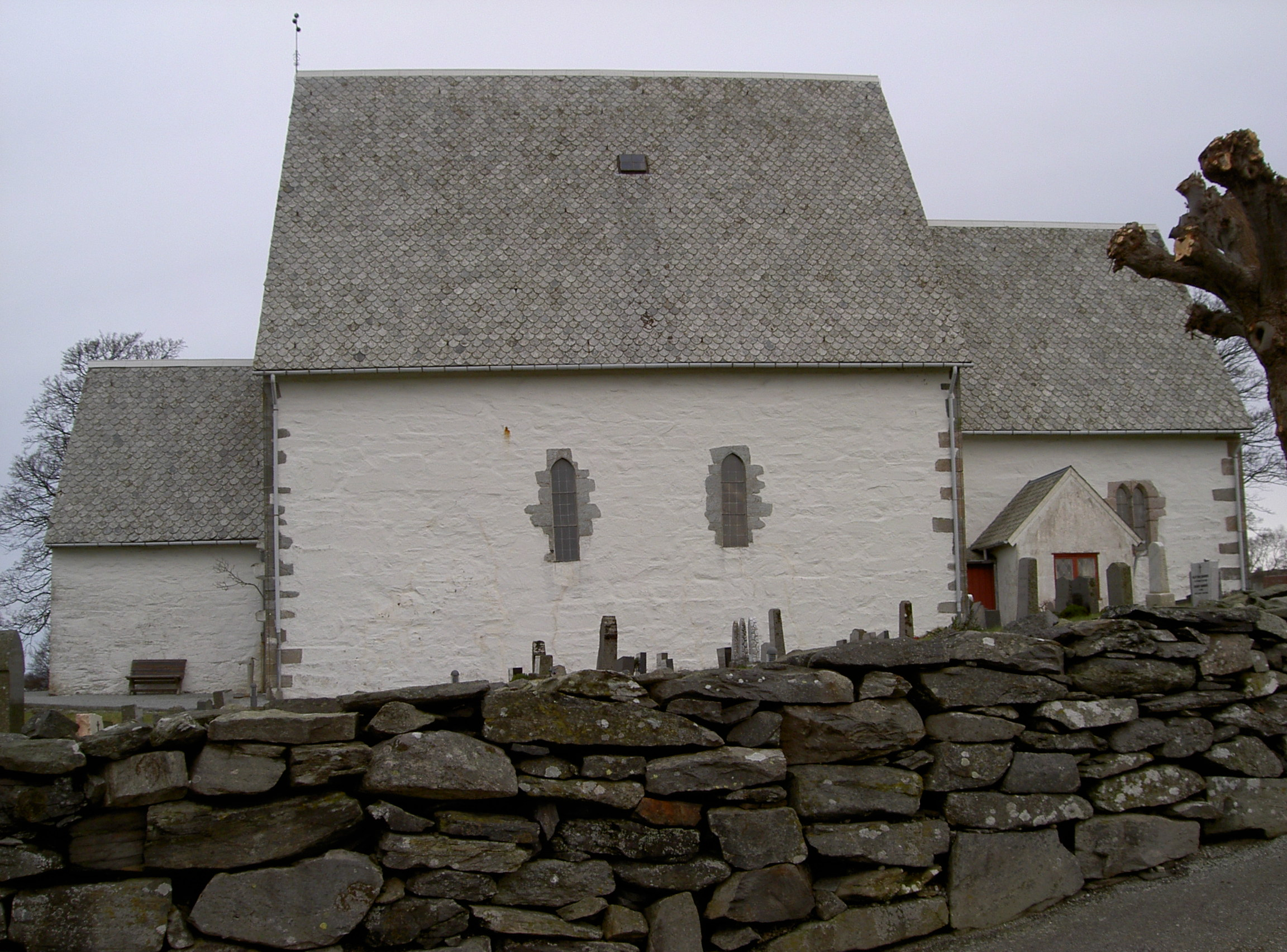
- View of the church
- Hesby Church
- 59.17622°N 5.81392°E
- Location: Stavanger Municipality, Rogaland
- Country: Norway
- Denomination: Church of Norway
- Previous denomination: Catholic Church
- Churchmanship: Evangelical Lutheran

History
- Status: Parish church
- Founded: 11th century
- Consecrated: 11th century

Architecture
- Functional status: Active
- Architectural type: Long church
- Completed: c. 1090

Specifications
- Capacity: 230
- Materials: Stone

Administration
- Diocese: Stavanger bispedømme
- Deanery: Tungenes prosti
- Parish: Hesby
- Norwegian Cultural Heritage Site
- Type: Church
- Status: Automatically protected
- ID: 84567

Hesby Church (Norwegian: Hesby kyrkje) is a parish church of the Church of Norway in the large Stavanger Municipality in Rogaland county, Norway. It is located in the village of Hesby on the island of Finnøy. It is the church for the Hesby parish which is part of the Tungenes prosti (deanery) in the Diocese of Stavanger. The old, stone church was built in a long church design around the year 1090 using designs by an unknown architect. The church seats about 230 people.

== History ==
The earliest existing historical records of the church date back to the year 1296, but the church was likely built during the early 12th century. Tradition says that the church was founded in the 1090s. Hesby was the seat of chiefs during the 11th century and during the Middle Ages was the residence of several notable Lendmenn. The church walls are about 1-metre (3 ft 3 in) thick. The stone church has a rectangular nave and a narrower, rectangular chancel. A large tower with a steeple on the west end of the building was removed during the early 1800s.

In 1814, this church served as an election church (Norwegian: valgkirke). Together with more than 300 other parish churches across Norway, it was a polling station for elections to the 1814 Norwegian Constituent Assembly which wrote the Constitution of Norway. This was Norway's first national elections. Each church parish was a constituency that elected people called "electors" who later met together in each county to elect the representatives for the assembly that was to meet at Eidsvoll Manor later that year.

== See also ==
- List of churches in Rogaland
