= Fogn Church =

Church in Rogaland, Norway

- Fogn kyrkje
- Fogn Church
- 59.14655°N 5.91181°E
- Location: Stavanger Municipality, Rogaland
- Country: Norway
- Denomination: Church of Norway
- Churchmanship: Evangelical Lutheran

History
- Status: Parish church
- Founded: 1916
- Consecrated: 17 Nov 1991

Architecture
- Functional status: Active
- Architect: Elisabeth Fidjestøl
- Architectural type: Cruciform
- Completed: 1991

Specifications
- Capacity: 190
- Materials: Wood

Administration
- Diocese: Stavanger bispedømme
- Deanery: Tungenes prosti
- Parish: Talgje
- Norwegian Cultural Heritage Site
- Type: Church
- Status: Not protected
- ID: 84172

Fogn Church (Norwegian: Fogn kyrkje) is a parish church of the Church of Norway in the large Stavanger Municipality in Rogaland county, Norway. It is located on the northwestern side of the island of Fogn. It is one of the two churches for the Talgje parish which is part of the Tungenes prosti (deanery) in the Diocese of Stavanger. The red, wooden church was built in a cruciform design in 1991 using designs by the architect Elisabet Breen Fidjestøl. The church seats about 190 people.

== History ==
The first church on Fogn was a small chapel built in 1916. In 1991, a new church was constructed to replace the little chapel. The new church was consecrated on 17 November 1991.

== See also ==
- List of churches in Rogaland
