= Talgje =

Island in Stavanger, Norway

Talgje Sør-Talgje
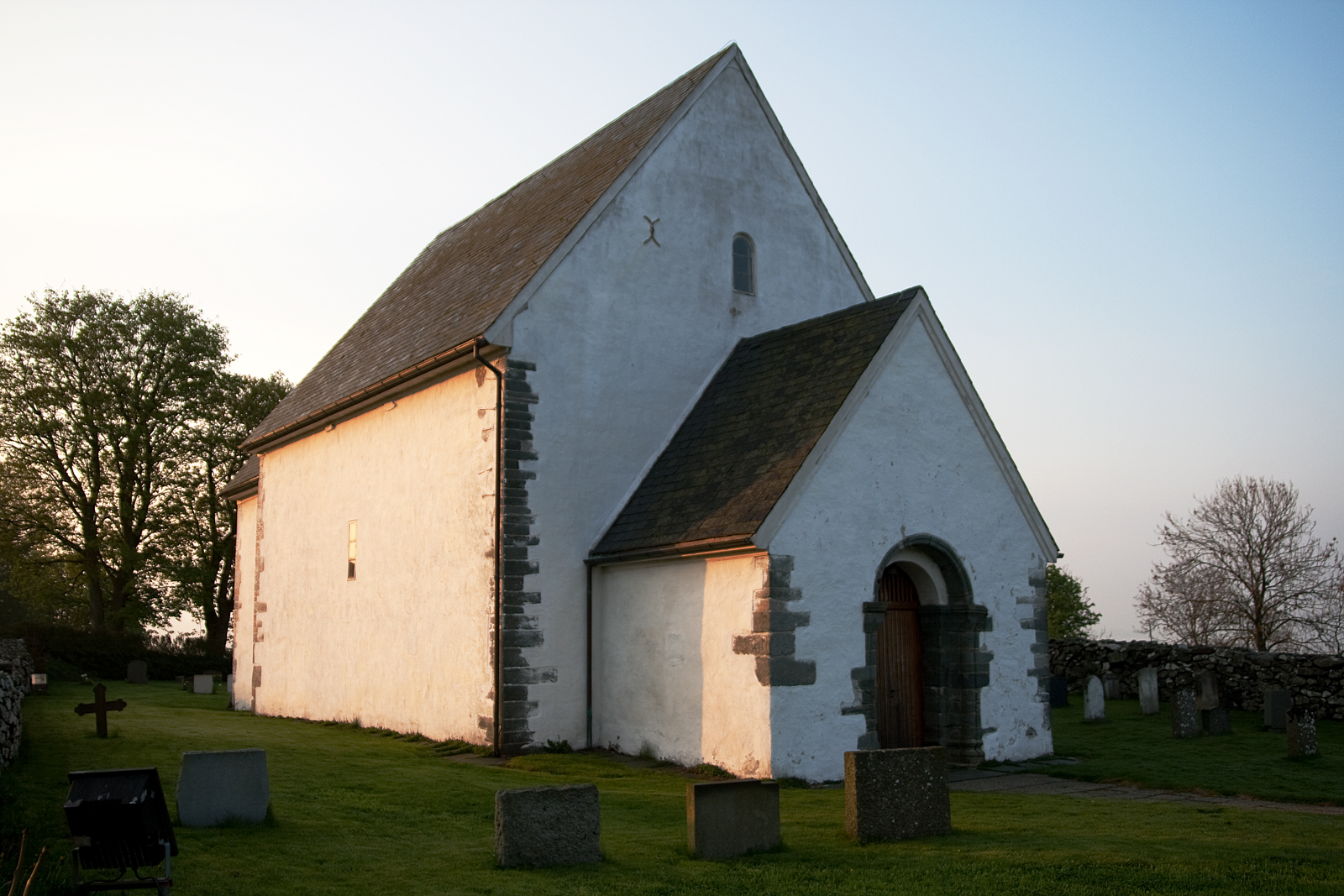
- View of the 1000-year old church on the island.
- Interactive map of the island

Geography
- Location: Rogaland, Norway
- Coordinates: 59.10968°N 5.82658°E
- Area: 4.1 km^{2} (1.6 sq mi)
- Length: 4 km (2.5 mi)
- Width: 1.8 km (1.12 mi)

Administration
- Norway
- County: Rogaland
- Municipality: Stavanger Municipality

Demographics
- Population: 279 (2022)

Talgje or Sør-Talgje is a populated island in the eastern part of Stavanger Municipality in Rogaland county, Norway. The 4.1-square-kilometre (1.6 sq mi) island is located in the Talgjefjorden and Brimsefjorden, both arms off of the main Boknafjorden in a large archipelago of islands northeast of the city of Stavanger. It is surrounded by islands: Brimse to the south, Rennesøy to the west, Finnøy to the north, and Fogn to the northeast. The island has a lot of agricultural uses, especially in growing tomatoes.

The island has a long history. The farm that today is known as Gard was once the seat of major clans that controlled the western part of Norway. Gaute Erlingson was a nobleman from the 1200s who lived here. Talgje Church dating from around the year 1100 is located here.

The Talgjefjord Tunnel connects the island to the larger island of Rennesøy which in turn is connected to the mainland through a series of tunnels and bridges. There are also ferries that run from eastern Talgje to the island of Fogn and to the village of Tau on the mainland.

== Name ==
There are actually two islands in Stavanger Municipality by the name Talgje. The other Talgje is part of the Sjernarøyane island group to the north. To disambiguate from this island from the other island by the same name, this island is sometimes referred to as Sør-Talgje (South Talgje) whereas the other one is called Nord-Talgje (North Talgje).

== History ==
The island was part of the old Finnøy Municipality until 1 January 2020 when it became part of Stavanger Municipality.

== See also ==
- List of islands of Norway
