= Halsnøy, Rogaland =

Island in Rogaland, Norway

Halsnøy Halsne Halsnøyna (historic)
- Interactive map of the island

Geography
- Location: Rogaland, Norway
- Coordinates: 59.19304°N 5.95026°E
- Archipelago: Fisterøyene
- Area: 4.9 km^{2} (1.9 sq mi)
- Length: 4.4 km (2.73 mi)
- Width: 1.4 km (0.87 mi)
- Highest elevation: 214 m (702 ft)
- Highest point: Eikefjellet

Administration
- Norway
- County: Rogaland
- Municipality: Stavanger Municipality

Demographics
- Population: 123 (2022)
- Pop. density: 25/km^{2} (65/sq mi)

Halsnøy or Halsne is an island in Stavanger Municipality in Rogaland county, Norway. It is about 30 kilometres (19 mi) northeast of the city of Stavanger. The 4.9-square-kilometre (1.9 sq mi) island is the largest island in of the Fisterøyene archipelago. Halsnøya is located south of the island of Ombo, southeast of the Sjernarøyane islands, east of the island of Finnøy, northeast of the island of Fogn, and west of the island of Randøy. The island is only accessible by boat, with regular ferry service from the nearby islands and to the mainland.

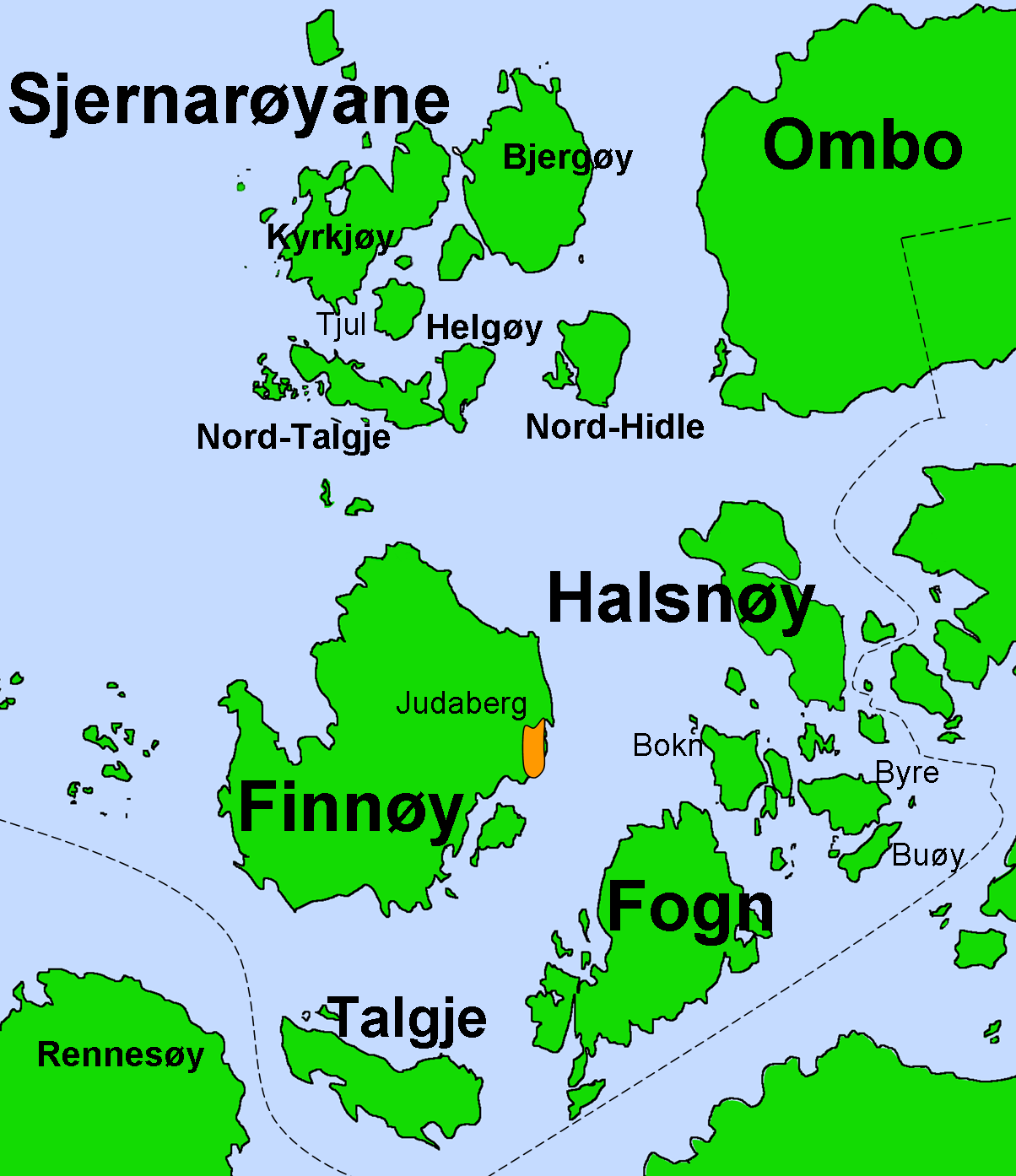
Map of the area

The island is hilly with some forest, where there are deer and pine marten. The bird life is rich, including a large grey heron colony. The rest of the island is cultivated for farming or pasture land. The 214-metre (702 ft) tall Eikefjellet mountain is the highest point on the island.

== See also ==
- List of islands of Norway
