= Finnøy (island) =

Island in Stavanger, Norway

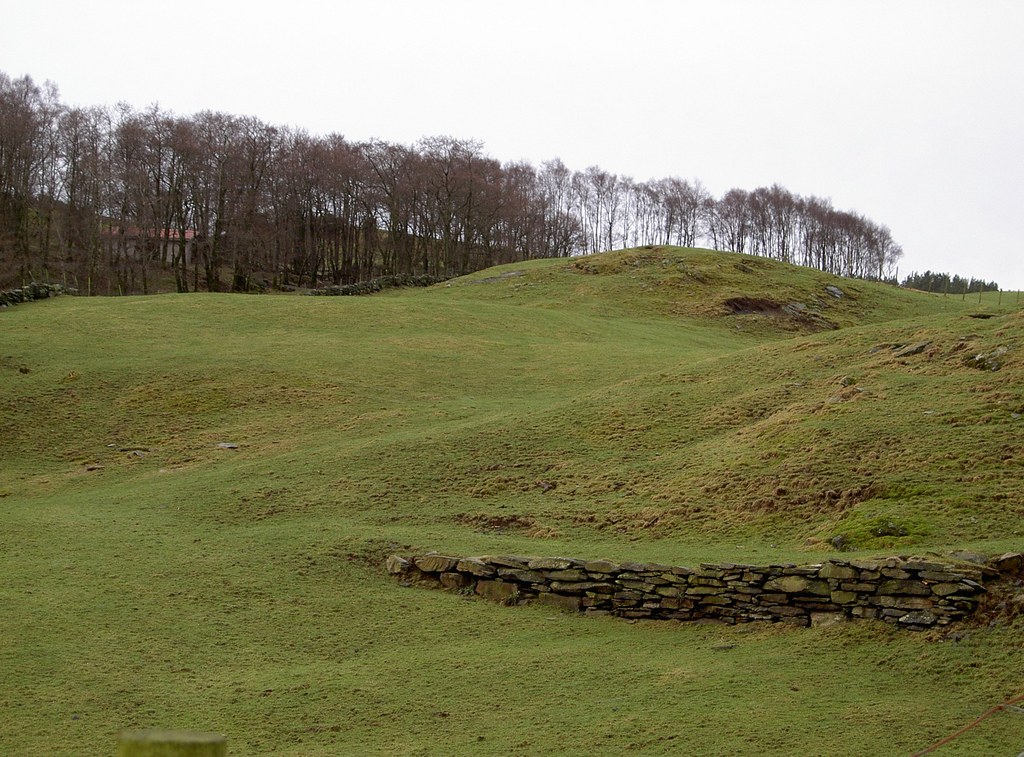
- View of hilly fields on the island of Finnøy
- Interactive map of the island

Geography
- Location: Rogaland, Norway
- Coordinates: 59.17054°N 5.82779°E
- Area: 25 km^{2} (9.7 sq mi)
- Length: 7 km (4.3 mi)
- Width: 5.4 km (3.36 mi)
- Highest elevation: 153 m (502 ft)
- Highest point: Vestbøvarden

Administration
- Norway
- County: Rogaland
- Municipality: Stavanger Municipality

Finnøy is an island in Stavanger Municipality in Rogaland county, Norway. The 25-square-kilometre (9.7 sq mi) island is located on the southern side of the Boknafjorden, about 20 kilometres (12 mi) northeast of the city of Stavanger. The largest urban area on the island is the village of Judaberg which is located on the eastern shore of the island.

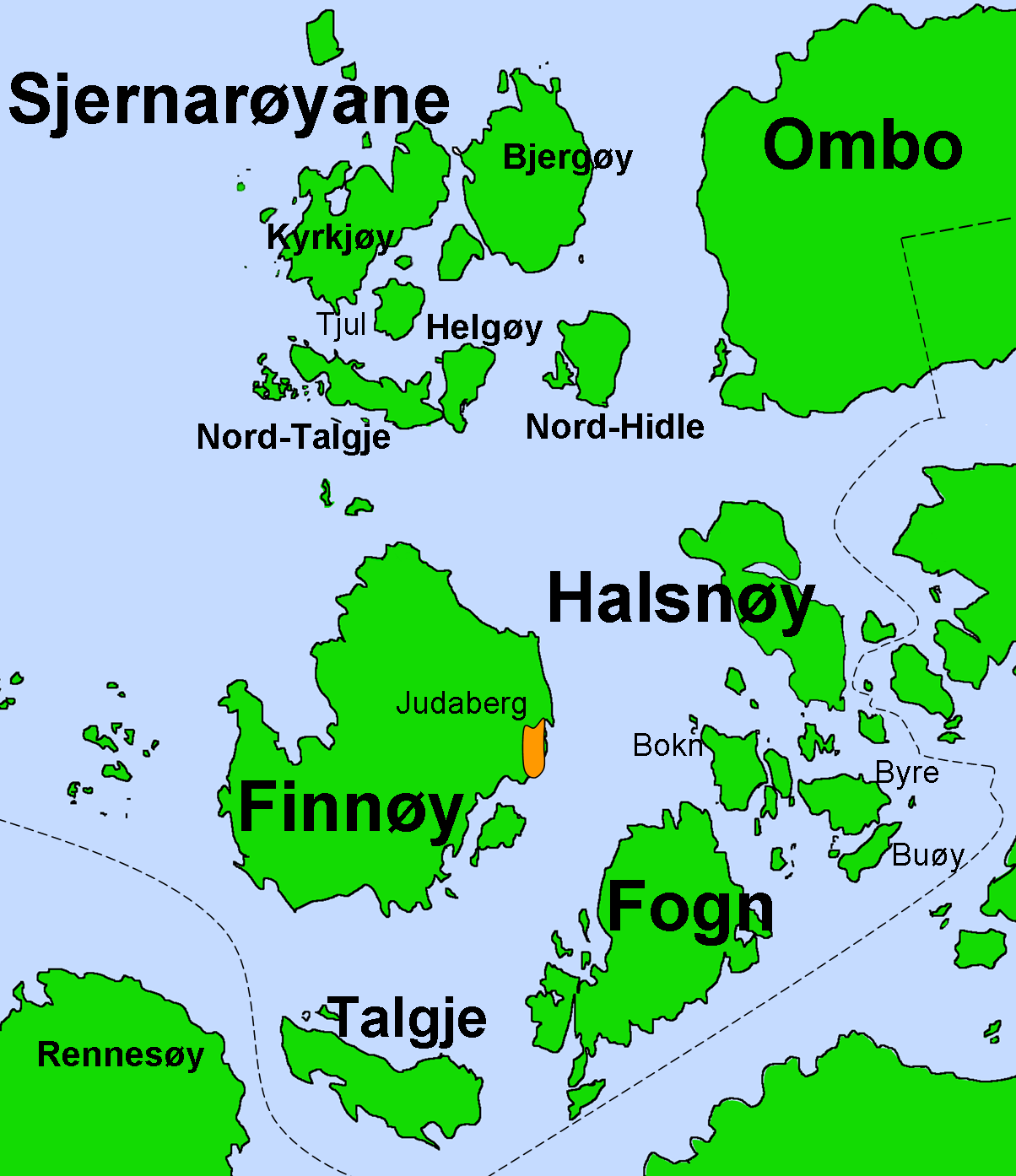
Map of the islands surrounding Finnøy

Finnøy island is connected to the mainland by a series of bridges and undersea tunnels. Finnøy Tunnel connects Finnøy to the nearby island of Rennesøy, and to the nearby island of Talgje. Finnøy also has regular ferry connections to most of the islands which surround it such as Ombo, Sjernarøyane, Halsnøy, and Fogn.

== History ==
The village of Hesby, on the western coast, is a historical seat of power dating back to the Middle Ages. Hesby is also the site of Hesby Church which dates back to around the year 1100 A.D.

The island was part of the old Finnøy Municipality until 1 January 2020 when it became part of Stavanger Municipality.

== See also ==
- List of islands of Norway
