= Fogn =

Island in Rogaland, Norway

- Interactive map of the island

Geography
- Location: Rogaland, Norway
- Coordinates: 59.13603°N 5.91756°E
- Area: 10.4 km^{2} (4.0 sq mi)
- Length: 5.8 km (3.6 mi)
- Width: 3 km (1.9 mi)
- Highest elevation: 166 m (545 ft)
- Highest point: Domfjellet

Administration
- Norway
- County: Rogaland
- Municipality: Stavanger Municipality

Demographics
- Population: 329 (2022)
- Pop. density: 32/km^{2} (83/sq mi)

Fogn is an island in Stavanger Municipality in Rogaland county, Norway. The 10.4-square-kilometre (4.0 sq mi) island lies southeast of the island of Finnøy and northeast of the island of Talgje, about 25 kilometres (16 mi) northeast of the city of Stavanger. The Finnøyfjorden lies between Fogn and Finnøy and the Fognafjorden lies between Fogn and the mainland to the southeast. The highest point on the island is the 166-metre (545 ft) tall mountain Domfjellet. Fogn Church is located on the island.

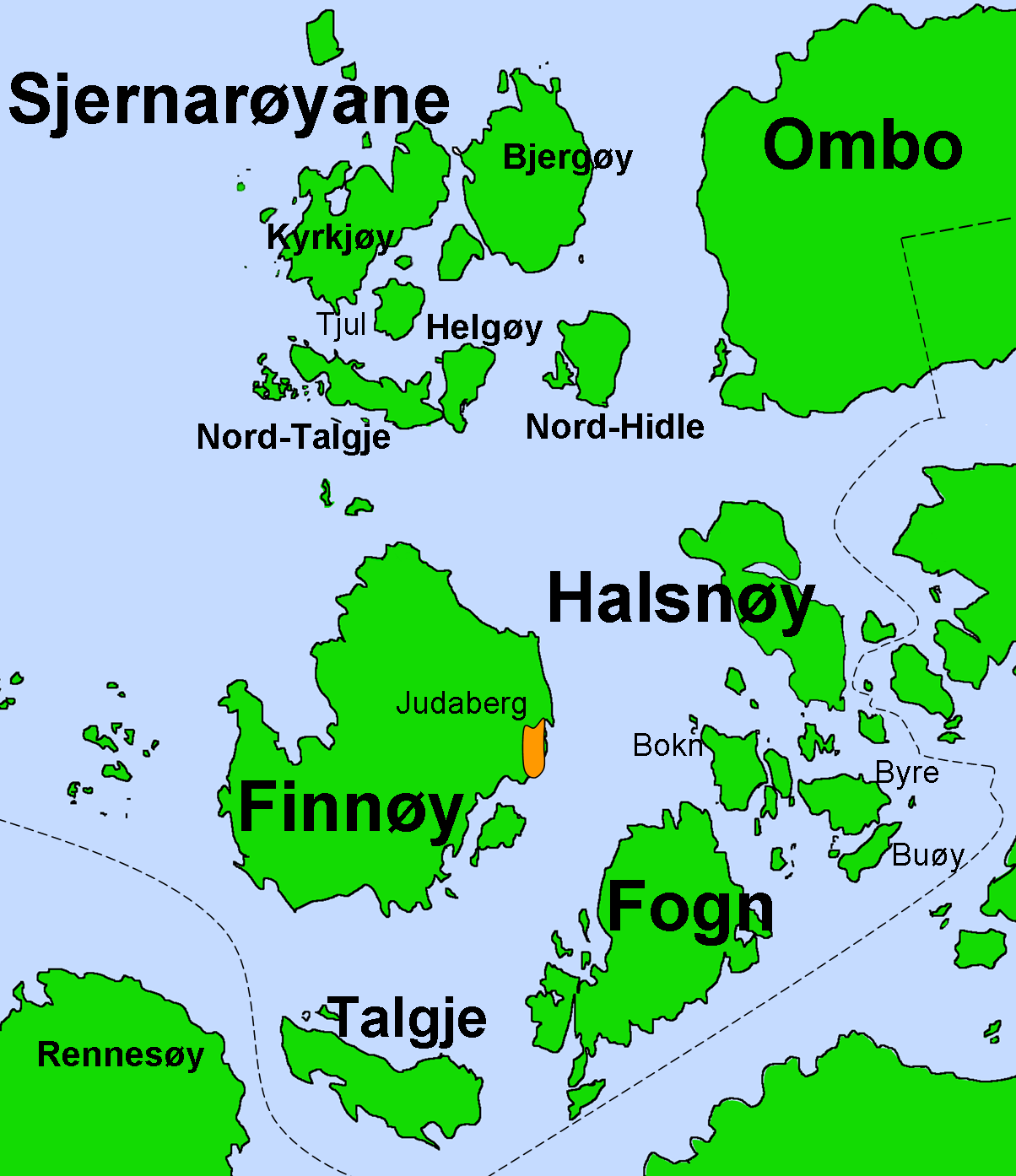
Fogn island and surroundings

The island is especially well known for its large production of tomatoes in greenhouses, about 15 percent of Norway's total production. This employs large amounts of foreign labor on the island. There are about 329 inhabitants on the island (2022), with many more summer residents who live in summer cottages on the island. The island has its own kindergarten and an elementary school that provides education through 7th grade. Starting with 8th grade, students must take the boat to middle school, located on the island of Finnøy.

There is no road connection to the island. There are regular ferry connections to the village of Judaberg on the island of Finnøy as well as to some of the other small surrounding islands, and on to the mainland.

== History ==
The island was part of the old Finnøy Municipality until 1 January 2020 when it became part of Stavanger Municipality.

== See also ==
- List of islands of Norway
