= Finnøy Tunnel =

Undersea road tunnel in Rogaland county, Norway

Finnøy Tunnel Finnøytunnelen
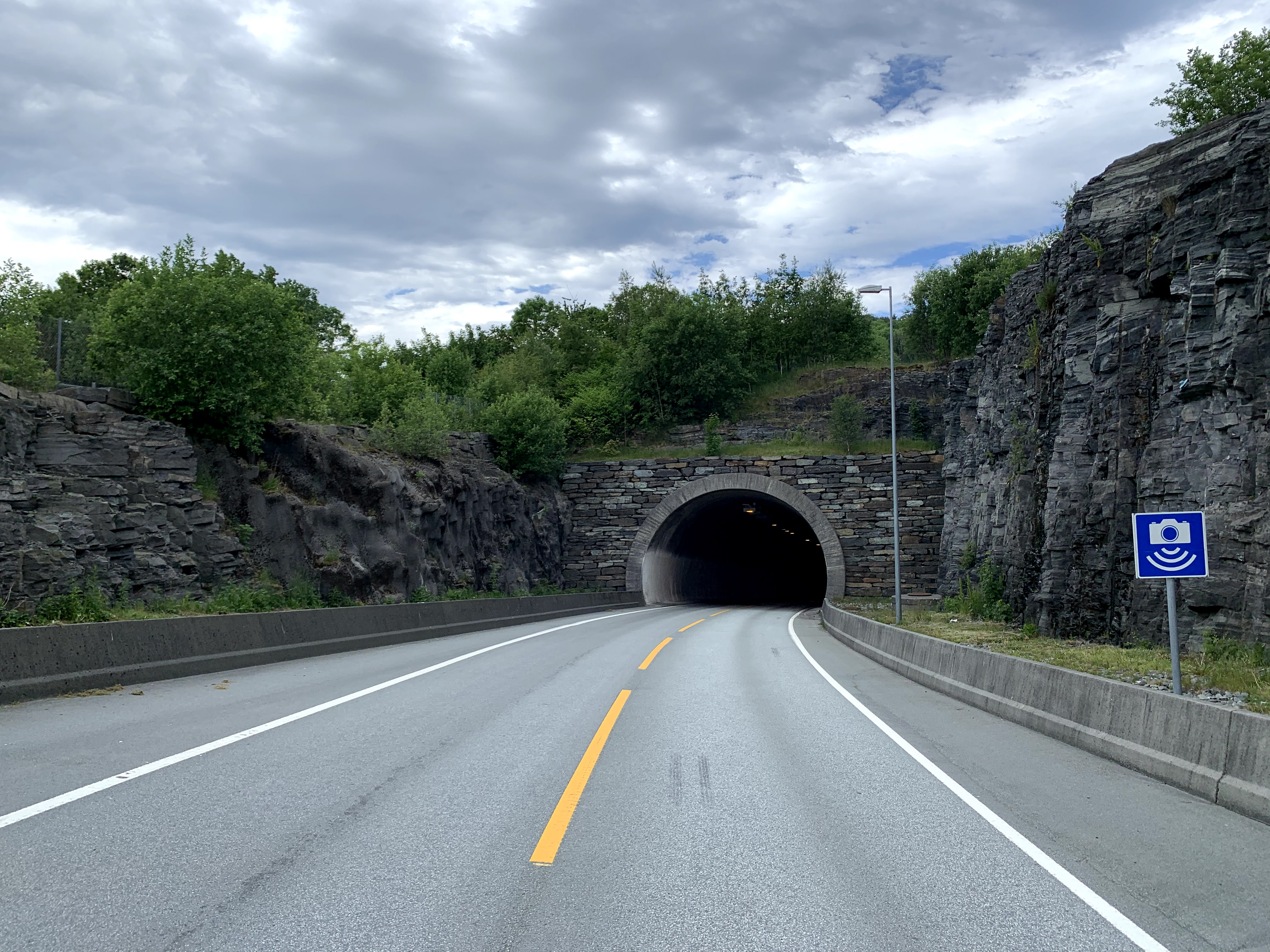
- Interactive map of Finnøy Tunnel; Finnøytunnelen

Overview
- Location: Rogaland, Norway
- Coordinates: 59.1222°N 5.7982°E
- Status: In use
- Route: Fv519
- Start: Rennesøy
- End: Finnøy

Operation
- Work began: 2006
- Opened: 2009
- Operator: Statens vegvesen
- Traffic: Automotive
- Vehicles per day: 1,089

Technical
- Length: 5,685 metres (3.53 mi)
- No. of lanes: 2
- Min elevation: −200 metres (−660 ft)
- Grade: 9% / 10.2%

The Finnøy Tunnel or Finnøy Fixed Link (Norwegian: "Finnøytunnelen" or "Finnfast") is an undersea road tunnel in Stavanger Municipality in Rogaland county, Norway. It connects the island of Finnøy to the nearby island of Rennesøy, and ultimately to the city of Stavanger on the mainland. The main tunnel is 5,685 metres (3.53 mi) long and it also includes a 1,467-metre-long (0.91 mi) arm, which connects the tunnel to the island of Talgje.

Located on County Road 519, the tunnel opened on 30 October 2009 and cost 530 million kr. The Talgje branch of the tunnel is part of County Road 606. The entire tunnel has a total of about 7,000 metres (4.3 mi) of tunnel, including the branch to Talgje. The tunnel reaches a lowest depth of 200 metres (660 ft) below sea level, with a maximum grade of 9%. The Talgje branch is slightly steeper, with a maximum grade of 10.2%. The main tunnel is two lanes, but the Talgje branch is only one lane wide, with passing areas that are slightly wider.
