= Ullandhaug =

Neighborhood in Stavanger, Norway

Coordinates: 58°57′N 5°44′E

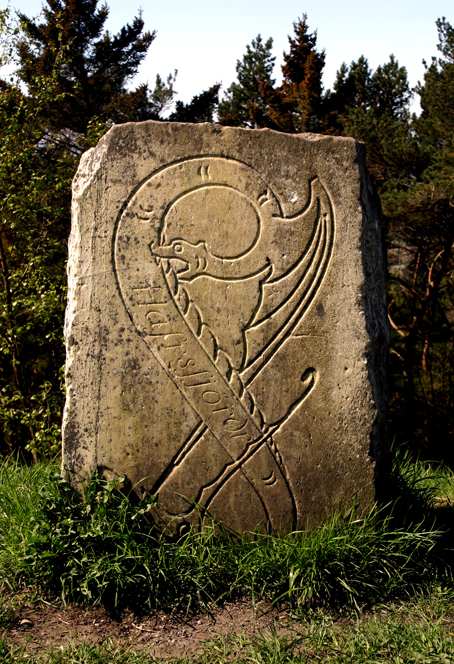
Rock carvings nearby the Ullandhaug tower.

Ullandhaug is a neighborhood (delområde) in the city of Stavanger which lies in the southwestern part of the large municipality of Stavanger in Rogaland county, Norway. It is located along the European route E39 highway in the borough of Hillevåg, south of the lake Mosvatnet. The neighborhood has a population of 6,636 which is distributed over an area of 2.55 square kilometres (630 acres).
