= Czechoslovakia (band) =

Norwegian musical duo

- Origin: Stavanger, Norway
- Genres: Electronic: Pop Crossover
- Years active: 2003–present
- Label: no label
- Members: Edvard Brygfjeld; Tore Meberg
- Website: www.myspace.com/tsjekkoslovakia

Czechoslovakia is a Norwegian duo based in Stavanger, Norway. Their musical style is described as dreamy, electronica pop with emphasis on moods.

== History ==
Czechoslovakia consists of singer and composer Tore Meberg and producer Edvard Brygfjeld. Musically they come from very different backgrounds. Tore is also front man in the group The Love Revolt, but also has experience as singer, guitar and keyboard player from band such as Watershed. Edvard has been involved in several other projects, f.ex. Butti49 and Elak.

== Members ==
- Tore Meberg – vocals, piano, synthesizers, acoustic guitar, bass, composer
- Edvard Brygjeld – programming, bass, electric guitar, producer

== Discography ==
- Moods we used to make (2010)
- Beirut (2010)
- Subtle Standards (2011)

== Other works ==
- Himmelblå, sangene fra serien (2008)

== Awards ==
- 2007: Voted "Ukas urørt" on Norwegian radio station NRK P3 for the song "Moods we used to Make"
