= Stavanger =

City in Rogaland, Norway

Stavanger Stavanger kommune
- Municipality
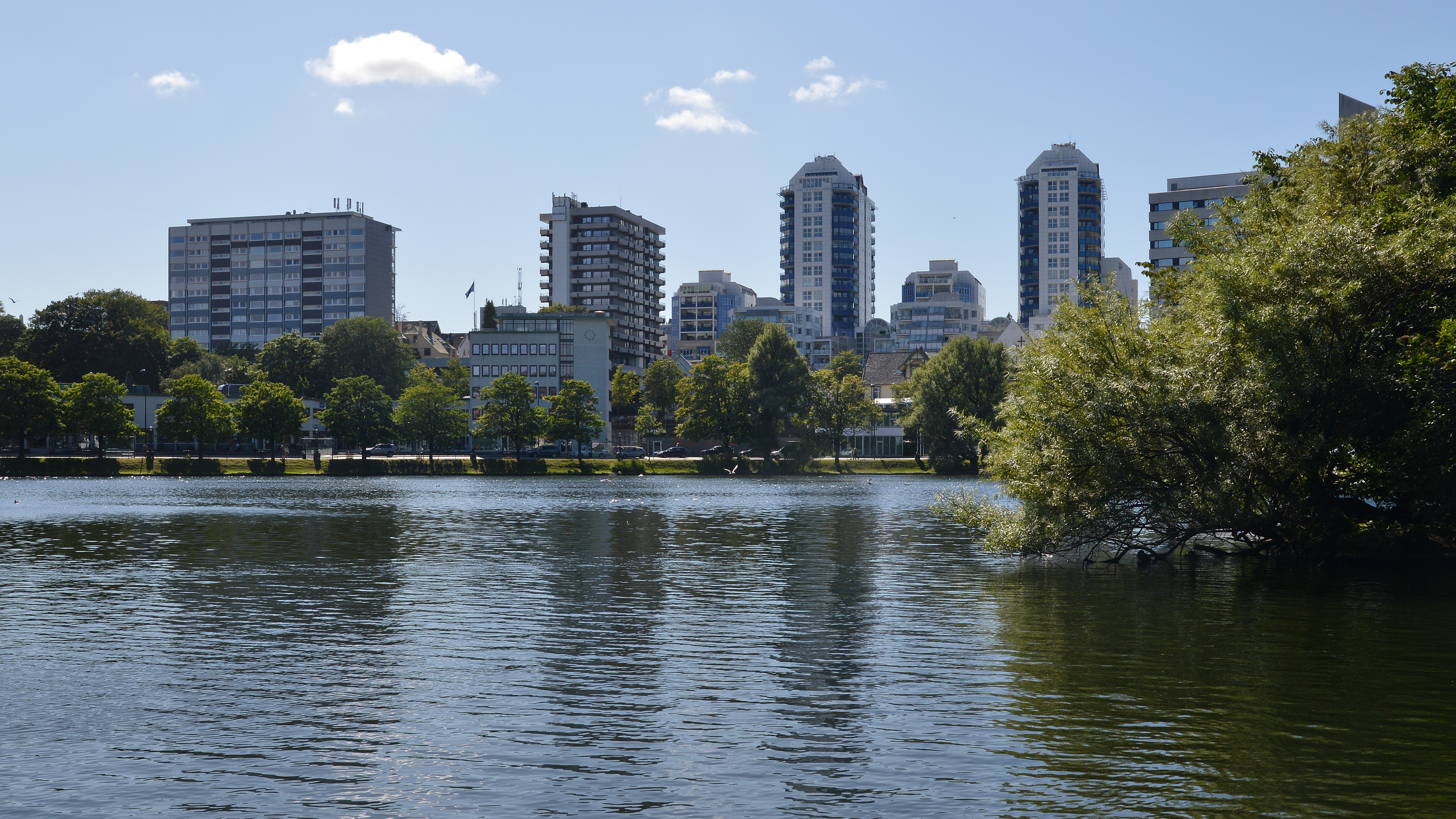
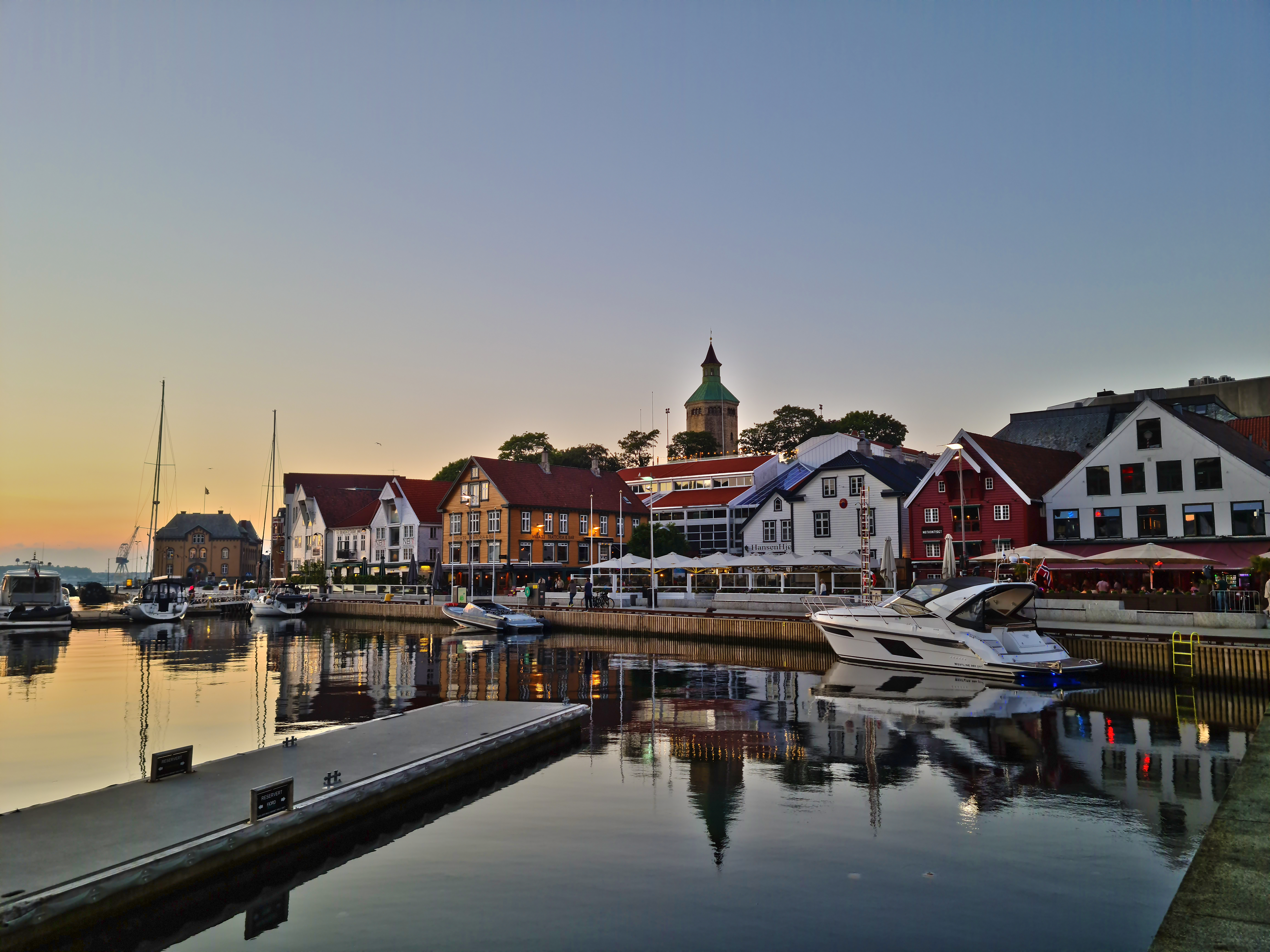
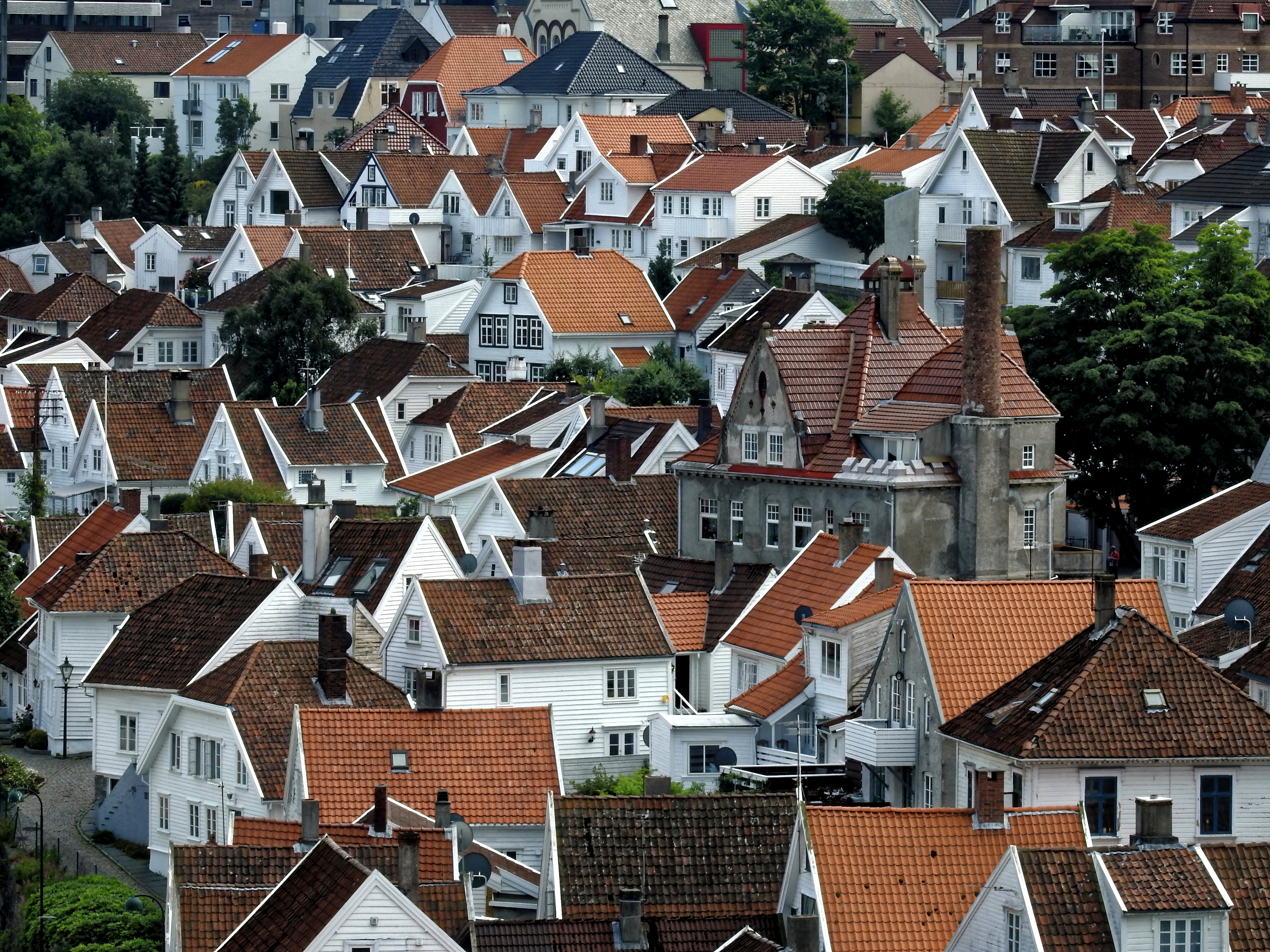
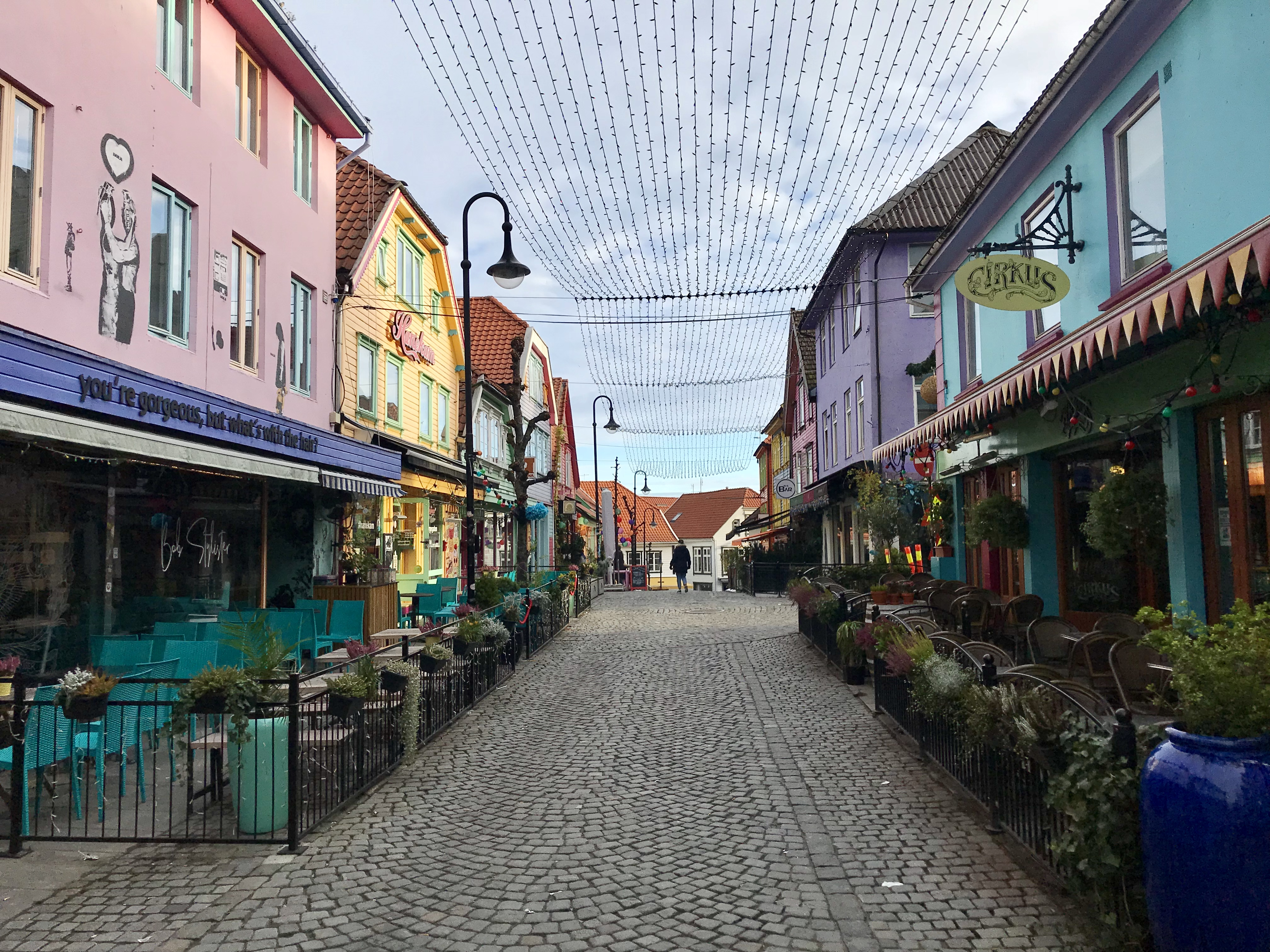
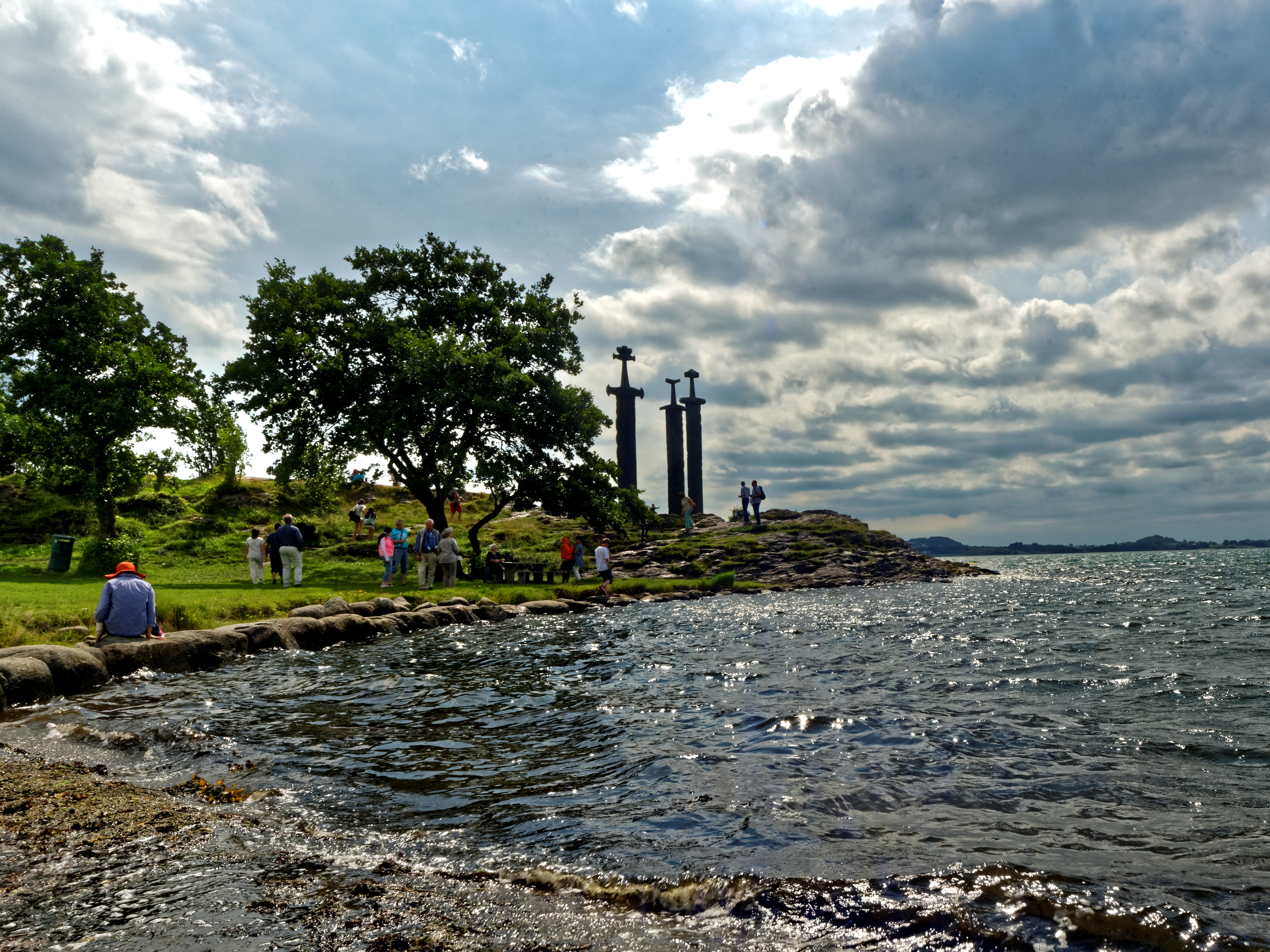
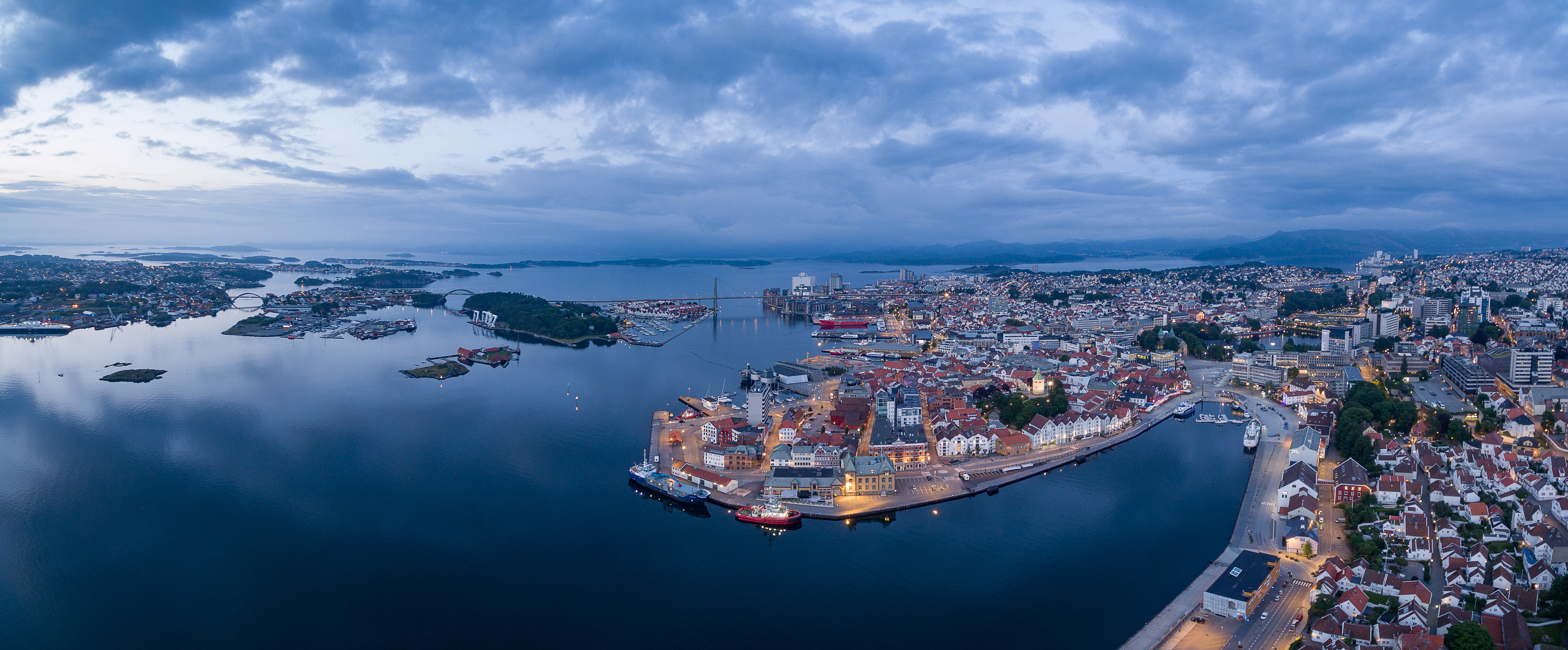
- From the top: Breiavatnet, The street Skagenkaien, Gamle Stavanger, The street Øvre Holmegate, Sverd i fjell, Stavanger city centre

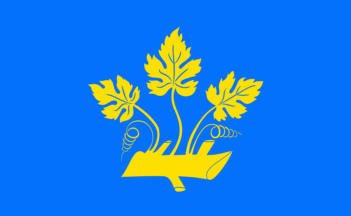
- Flag Coat of arms
- Nicknames: Oljebyen, The oil capital

- Location within Rogaland Location within Norway Location within Europe
- Coordinates: 58°58′12″N 05°43′53″E
- Country: Norway
- Municipality: Stavanger
- County: Rogaland
- District: Jæren
- Official language: Bokmål
- Established: 1125

Government
  - Mayor: Tormod W. Losnedal (H)

Area
  - Municipality: 71.35 km^{2} (27.55 sq mi)
  - Urban: 77.98 km^{2} (30.11 sq mi)
  - Metro: 2,598 km^{2} (1,003 sq mi)

Population (2025)
  - Municipality: 151,669
  - Density: 2,126/km^{2} (5,506/sq mi)
  - Urban: 241,644
  - Urban density: 3,099/km^{2} (8,026/sq mi)
  - Metro: 360,000
  - Metro density: 140/km^{2} (360/sq mi)
  - Municipality/ Urban rank: 4th/3rd
  - Metro rank: 3rd
- Demonym: Siddis

Nationalities
  - Norwegians: 75%
  - Other: 25%

GDP
  - Metro: €31.582 billion (2021)
- Time zone: UTC+01:00 (CET)
  - Summer (DST): UTC+02:00 (CEST)
- Website: www.stavanger.kommune.no

Historical population
Year	Pop.	±%
1769	3,337	—
1951	50,617	+1416.8%
1960	52,835	+4.4%
1970	81,741	+54.7%
1980	89,913	+10.0%
1990	97,570	+8.5%
2000	108,818	+11.5%
2010	123,850	+13.8%
Source: Statistics Norway

Stavanger, (Note: /stəˈvæŋər/, UK also /stæˈ-/, US usually /stɑːˈvɑːŋər, stəˈ-/; Norwegian: [stɑˈvɑ̀ŋːər], locally [staˈvǎŋːɔʁ]) officially the Stavanger Municipality, is a city and municipality in Norway. It is the third largest city and third largest metropolitan area in Norway (through conurbation with neighboring Sandnes Municipality) and the administrative center of Rogaland county. The municipality is the fourth most populous in Norway. Located on the Stavanger Peninsula in southwest Norway, Stavanger counts its official founding year as 1125, the year the Stavanger Cathedral was completed. Stavanger's core is to a large degree 18th- and 19th-century wooden houses that are protected and considered part of the city's cultural heritage. This has caused the town center and inner city to retain a small-town character with an unusually high ratio of detached houses, and has contributed significantly to spreading the city's population growth to outlying parts of Greater Stavanger.

The city's population rapidly grew in the late 20th century due to its oil industry. Stavanger is known today as the Oil Capital of Norway. Norwegian energy company Equinor, the largest company in the Nordic region, has its headquarters in Stavanger. Multiple educational institutions for higher education are located in Stavanger. The largest of these is the University of Stavanger.

Domestic and international military installations are located in Stavanger, including the NATO Joint Warfare Centre. Other international establishments, and especially local branches of foreign oil and gas companies, contribute further to a significant foreign population in the city. The city has a strong international profile and 22.1% of the population has an immigrant background. In 2020, it was rated as the most liveable city for European expatriates in Norway as well as 5th in Europe by ECA International. Stavanger has, since the early 2000s, consistently had an unemployment rate significantly lower than the European average. In August 2022, the unemployment rate was 1.6%. The city also appears on various lists of most expensive cities in the world, and it has even been ranked as the world's most expensive city by certain indices.

The climate of the city is very mild by Nordic standards due to a strong maritime influence. As a result, winter usually remains above freezing whereas heat waves are rare and seldom long. Rainfall is common, although less so than in areas further north on the coastline.

Stavanger is served by international airport Stavanger Airport, Sola, which offers flights to cities in most major European countries, as well as a limited number of intercontinental charter flights. The airport was rated as one of the world's most punctual airports of its category by OAG in 2020.

Every two years, Stavanger organizes the Offshore Northern Seas (ONS), which is the second largest exhibition and conference for the energy sector. The Gladmat food festival is also held each year and is considered to be one of Scandinavia's leading food festivals. The city is also known for being one of the nation's premier culinary clusters. Stavanger was awarded the 2008 European Capital of Culture alongside Liverpool.

== History ==
The first traces of settlement in the Stavanger region come from the days when the ice retreated after the last ice age c. 10,000 years ago. A number of historians have argued convincingly that North-Jæren was an economic and military center as far back as the 9th and 10th centuries with the consolidation of the nation at the Battle of Hafrsfjord around 872. Stavanger grew into a center of church administration and an important south-west coast market town around 1100–1300.

Stavanger fulfilled an urban role prior to its status as city (1125), from around the time the Stavanger bishopric was established in the 1120s. Bishop Reinald, who may have come from Winchester, England, is said to have started construction of Stavanger Cathedral (Norwegian: Stavanger domkirke) around 1100. It was finished around 1125, and the city of Stavanger counts 1125 as its year of foundation.

With the Protestant Reformation in 1536, Stavanger's role as a religious center declined, and the establishment of Kristiansand in the early 17th century led to the relocation of the bishopric. However, rich herring fisheries in the 19th century gave the city new life. - Stavanger was established as a municipality on 1 January 1838 (see formannskapsdistrikt law). On 1 January 1867, a small area of Hetland Municipality (population: 200) was transferred to the city of Stavanger. Again on 1 January 1879, another area of Hetland Municipality (population: 1,357) was transferred to Stavanger. Then again on 1 January 1906, the city again annexed another area of Hetland Municipality (population: 399). On 1 July 1923, part of Hetland Municipality (population: 3,063) was moved to the city once again. Finally on 1 July 1953, a final portion of Hetland Municipality (population: 831) was moved to Stavanger. In the 1960s, the work of the Schei Committee pushed for many municipal mergers across Norway. As a result of this, on 1 January 1965, the city of Stavanger (population: 51,470) was merged with Madla Municipality (population: 6,025) and most of Hetland Municipality (population: 20,861).

The city's history is a continuous alternation between economic booms and recessions. For long periods of time its most important industries have been shipping, shipbuilding, the fish canning industry and associated subcontractors.

In 1969, a new boom started as oil was first discovered in the North Sea. After much discussion, Stavanger was chosen to be the on-shore center for the oil industry on the Norwegian sector of the North Sea, and a period of hectic growth followed.

On 1 January 2020, the neighboring Finnøy Municipality and Rennesøy Municipality merged with Stavanger to form a new, larger municipality.

=== City development ===
Stavanger is one of Norway's oldest cities. It emerged in the 12th century during a period of population growth and increasing urbanisation throughout northern Europe. The archaeological and historical sources about the first city development are sparse. Therefore, there is much we do not know about the first city development. The city stands out as an important area from early times, as a desirable foothold for the monarchy and the church, as both needed a strong foothold in the South West coast area. In North Jæren, rich archaeological material suggests that the chiefs held considerable power from the early Iron Age. Stavanger had a natural harbor and was, with Jæren in the south, strategically important to the county of the East as well as to the shipping route along the western coast and the fertile Ryfylke Islands in the north.

The earliest Christian impulses in Norway came to Stavanger region through trade connections with Continental Europe and Great Britain. This flourished during the Viking era. In the mid 10th century, traditional Norse burial customs ceased in the Stavanger area, at the same time as the first Christian priests began their work. Big stone crosses are visible memorials of this early Christian age (including the Tjora and Kvitsøy). On the overland approach to Stavanger, a memorial cross of HERS and lendmann Erling Skjalgsson was erected after his fall in 1028. Erling controlled power over the South West coast, and the location of the cross indicates that he had a special connection to Stavanger. The inscription on the cross shows a priest was responsible for the inscription, and he may have performed an early service at a church on site.

Archaeological investigations in the current downtown and in the crypt of Stavanger Cathedral show that the great fire of 1272 probably left large parts of the city and the cathedral in ruins, including the Romanesque chancel of the cathedral. The reconstruction after the fire led to the cathedral's Western Front being replaced with a vestibule, as well as to the construction (or reconstruction) of St. Mary's Church, Bishop's Chapel, the Gothic cathedral and the expansion of the stone cellar at Kongsberg.

Stavanger has a long history of education in Western Europe. It was the monastery here that first saw the need to train new employees through education. The first organized teaching in the city probably took place at a Benedictine monastery in the town, either Olav's Monastery or Monastery of people from the mid-12th century.

One of the most important events in Stavanger's city history was the gift letter that King Magnus Erlingsson gave to Stavanger Bishop Eirik Ivarsson in the second half of the 1100s. Exactly when the king made this gift letter, and under what circumstances it happened, is unknown. It may have been in 1163–1164, in connection with the King Magnus's coronation, but could also have been around 1181–1184, in connection with the support Stavanger Bishop Erik gave King Magnus at the end of the king's fight against the late King Sverre.

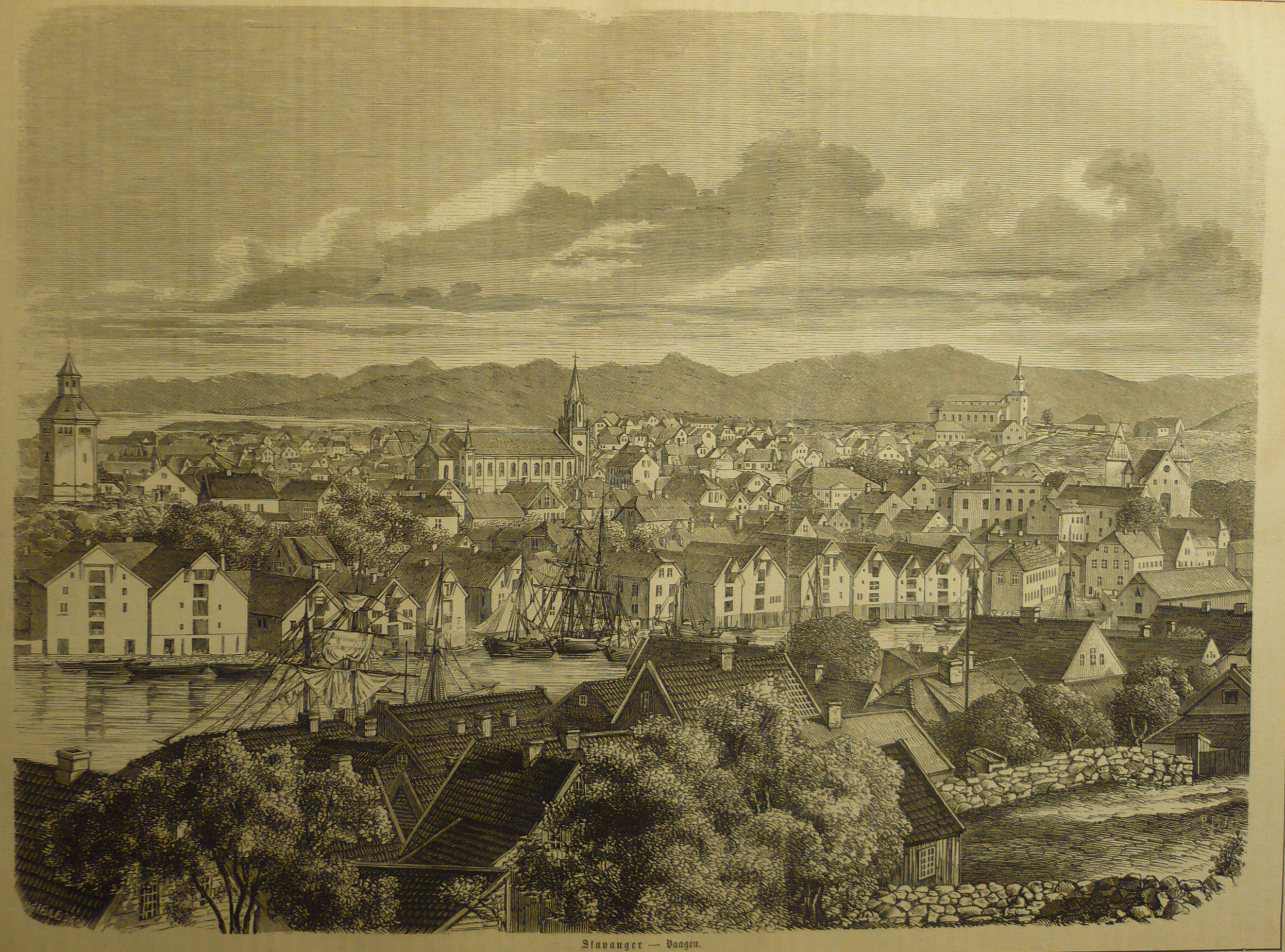
View of Stavanger in 1867

It is undoubtedly correct to characterize Stavanger as a church city throughout the Middle Ages, up to the Reformation. The Reformation, however, dealt a hard blow to the Church in specific and Stavanger in general. The cathedral, the bishop and canons of the monastery had been large landowners. Recession of the city began with the loss of people in rural areas, as a result of which the revenues of the cathedral and the bishop fell dramatically due to reduced rental income. In 1537 the bishop's and the monastery's estate and property was confiscated by the king. Kongsberg was plundered by Christoffer Trondsen in 1539, at which time St. Swithun's casket disappeared and Bishop Hoskuld Hoskuldsson may have been executed.

=== World War II ===
In a prelude to the invasion, on 8 April, the German freighter Roda (6,780 grt.) anchored by Ulsnes. Roda was reportedly loaded with coke, but customs officials and police authorities became suspicious about other cargo when they observed that the ship was not riding deep in the water. The ship was boarded and was ordered to move to Riska. However, Roda did not move, and the captain of the Æger, Niels Larsen Bruun, decided on his own initiative to sink the ship. After sending the crew off in lifeboats, Æger used 25 shots with 10 cm (3.9 in) Bofors guns to sink Roda.

Early on the morning of 9 April 1940, explosions and bomb blasts from Sola Municipality, edge and news bulletins on radio announced the German attack on Norway. Sola Airport was the Germans' first target on North Jæren. The airport was attacked by six German Messerschmitt Bf 110 fighters at around 8 am. The airport had been built in 1937, and in April 1940 fortifications round the airport were not yet complete. Fortifications consisted of a concrete bunker still under construction and several open shooting positions. Armament consisted of three heavy anti-aircraft machine guns, three heavy machine guns configured for ground targets, and some light machine guns at the disposal of the approximately 80 soldiers who defended the airport. The bomber wing was transferred to Sola Airport in 1939, but the planes, a total of six Fokker and three Caproni aircraft, were old and outdated. Shortly after the attack began, however, they took off.

The German air attack increased in intensity. The bombardment lasted for about an hour before 10 slow Ju 52 transport aircraft arrived over the airport. They had taken off from the airport at Hamburg a few hours earlier. In a parachute assault, the transport planes first dropped yellow containers containing weapons and equipment, then between 10 and 12 paratroopers from each plane. This was only the second ever wartime parachute assault; the first had occurred only three hours earlier, when a bridge south of Denmark was captured in the same way. At the Sola airport, the concrete bunker held out longest, but was eventually put out of action with a hand grenade. While Norwegian soldiers were badly injured in the attempted defense, there were no fatalities; in contrast, the Germans lost several. Lieutenant Thor Tang, who led the Norwegian defense of the airport, capitulated at 10:00, and the Germans immediately began landing troops, fuel and other supplies. In all, 200 to 300 transport aircraft arrived in Sola during invasion day, and by evening several hundred soldiers and large quantities of materiel had been moved from Germany to Sola.

By around 12:30 on 9 April, the first German troops advanced into Stavanger without resistance. The police station, telephone office, telegraph center, post office, port office, customs house and the gas company were the most important places, and now came under control of the Germans. The city was conquered without conflict, but the first sparks of resistance had been ignited, and several men left the city and made their way to the Norwegian troops inside Gjesdal, there to join the armed struggle against the enemy.

The Germans had placed a high priority to have a good railway connection between the air base at Sola – Stavanger district, and the rest of the country. However, it was not until 29 April 1944, that the Southern Railway was completed to Stavanger. In 1940, the Germans had envisioned it to be completed no later than 1 November 1941.

After Hitler's death in 1945, Grand Admiral Karl Dönitz took over leadership of the German forces, and on 9 May 1945, gave the head of the German armed forces in Norway, General Franz Böhme, orders that "Reichskommissar" in Norway, Josef Terboven, was deposed and that all his duties were transferred to Böhme. To Böhme, in turn, he gave the task of how the capitulation of Festung Norwegen was to be implemented. There were around 15,000 German soldiers in Rogaland in 1945, and it was there where the commander of 274 Infantry Division, General Weckman, gave the formal German surrender.

Before repatriation, the Germans were required to remain and clean up after five years of occupation. There were 180 German minefields in Rogaland, with a total of 480,000 mines, all of which the German Wehrmacht were required to clear. Sixty-two Germans were killed and 94 were injured during mine clearance in Rogaland. Mines from this period continue to be uncovered.

=== Oil capital ===
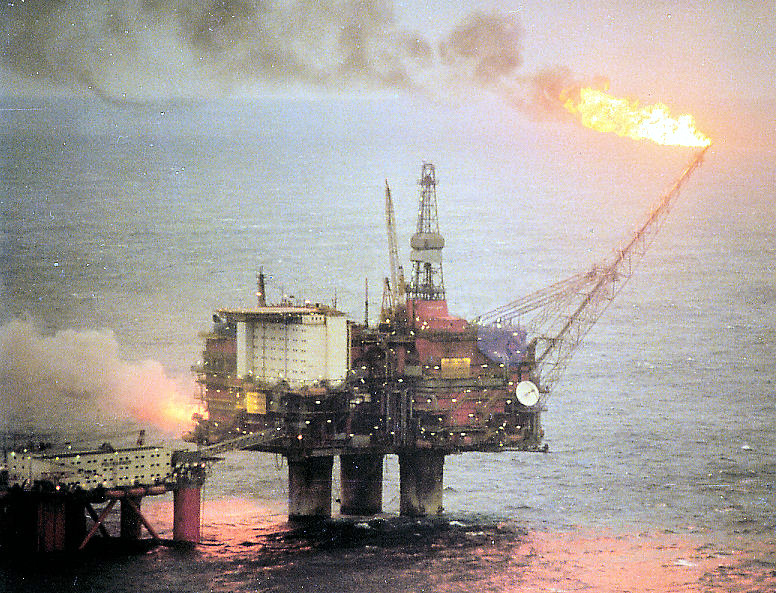
The oil platform Statfjord A in 1982. Stavanger today reigns as a center for the oil industry in Norway

In 1969, a new boom started as oil was first discovered in the North Sea. After much discussion, Stavanger was chosen to be the on-shore center for the oil industry on the Norwegian sector of the North Sea, and a period of hectic growth followed.

In March 1965 an agreement was signed between Norway and the United Kingdom on the sharing of the continental shelf by the median line principle. That same year a similar agreement was signed between Norway and Denmark. It was designed as a legal regime for oil exploration. The first licensing round on the Norwegian shelf was announced on 13 April 1965, and in August of that same year the government granted 22 licenses for 78 blocks for oil companies or groups of companies. The production license gave oil companies exclusive rights to exploration, drilling and production in a defined geographical area for a given period at an annual fee. Esso was the first oil company to start drilling for oil off the coast of Norway. The semi-submersible drilling vessel Ocean Traveler was towed from New Orleans to Norway, and the vessel began drilling on 19 July 1966, at block 8/3, about 180 km (110 mi) southwest of Stavanger.

=== Coat of arms ===
Hallvard Trætteberg (1898–1987), a leading specialist in heraldry, was commissioned to design the official coat of arms of Stavanger, a work that lasted from the end of the 1920s until approved on 11 August 1939. His design is also used as the city's arms, flag, and seal. The coat of arms is based upon a seal which dated from 1591. It shows a branch of vine (Vitis vinifera). Which leaves and branch type that is depicted on the coat of arms has been hotly debated. The original meaning and representation of the vine remains unknown.

=== Origin of the name ===
The Old Norse form of the name was Stafangr. The origin of the name has been discussed for decades, and the most used interpretation is that it originally was the name of the inlet now called Vågen, which was the original site of the city, on the east shore of the bay.

The first element of the name is stafr meaning 'staff' or 'branch'. This could refer to the form of the inlet, but also to the form of the mountain Valberget (Staven meaning 'the staff,' is a common name of high and steep mountains in Norway). The last element is angr meaning 'inlet, bay'. Facing the North Sea, Stavanger has always been economically dependent on its access to the sea.

== Government ==
Stavanger Municipality is responsible for primary education (through 10th grade), outpatient health services, senior citizen services, welfare and other social services, zoning, economic development, and municipal roads and utilities. The municipality is governed by a municipal council of directly elected representatives. The mayor is indirectly elected by a vote of the municipal council. The municipality is under the jurisdiction of the Sør-Rogaland District Court and the Gulating Court of Appeal.

=== Municipal council ===
The municipal council (Kommunestyre) of Stavanger is made up of 67 representatives who are elected to four year terms. The tables below show the current and historical composition of the council by political party.

In September 2024, the mayor asked to be relieved of her duties; she is no longer a member of the Conservative Party; as of the first week of October, she has formally claimed that it would not be any significant disadvantage for her, to [continue to] take care of the office [that she holds, if authorities do not relieve her of her duties]; the municipal council is scheduled to vote (14 October) in regard to - if she should be relieved of her duties.

Stavanger kommunestyre 2023–2027
Party name (in Norwegian)	Number of representatives
Labour Party (Arbeiderpartiet)	22
Progress Party (Fremskrittspartiet)	6
Green Party (Miljøpartiet De Grønne)	2
Conservative Party (Høyre)	21
Industry and Business Party (Industri‑ og Næringspartiet)	2
Christian Democratic Party (Kristelig Folkeparti)	3
Pensioners' Party (Pensjonistpartiet)	1
Red Party (Rødt)	3
Centre Party (Senterpartiet)	1
Socialist Left Party (Sosialistisk Venstreparti)	3
Liberal Party (Venstre)	3
Total number of members:	67

Stavanger kommunestyre 2019–2023
Party name (in Norwegian)	Number of representatives
Labour Party (Arbeiderpartiet)	18
People's Action No to More Road Tolls (Folkeaksjonen nei til mer bompenger)	6
Progress Party (Fremskrittspartiet)	6
Green Party (Miljøpartiet De Grønne)	4
Conservative Party (Høyre)	16
Christian Democratic Party (Kristelig Folkeparti)	3
Pensioners' Party (Pensjonistpartiet)	1
Red Party (Rødt)	4
Centre Party (Senterpartiet)	3
Socialist Left Party (Sosialistisk Venstreparti)	3
Liberal Party (Venstre)	3
Total number of members:	67

Stavanger kommunestyre 2015–2019
Party name (in Norwegian)	Number of representatives
Labour Party (Arbeiderpartiet)	18
People's Action No to More Road Tolls (Folkeaksjonen nei til mer bompenger)	3
Progress Party (Fremskrittspartiet)	7
Green Party (Miljøpartiet De Grønne)	4
Conservative Party (Høyre)	19
Christian Democratic Party (Kristelig Folkeparti)	4
Pensioners' Party (Pensjonistpartiet)	1
Red Party (Rødt)	1
Centre Party (Senterpartiet)	1
Socialist Left Party (Sosialistisk Venstreparti)	3
Liberal Party (Venstre)	6
Total number of members:	67

Stavanger kommunestyre 2011–2015
Party name (in Norwegian)	Number of representatives
Labour Party (Arbeiderpartiet)	19
Progress Party (Fremskrittspartiet)	9
Green Party (Miljøpartiet De Grønne)	1
Conservative Party (Høyre)	23
Christian Democratic Party (Kristelig Folkeparti)	4
Pensioners' Party (Pensjonistpartiet)	1
Red Party (Rødt)	1
Centre Party (Senterpartiet)	1
Socialist Left Party (Sosialistisk Venstreparti)	3
Liberal Party (Venstre)	5
Total number of members:	67

Stavanger kommunestyre 2007–2011
Party name (in Norwegian)	Number of representatives
Labour Party (Arbeiderpartiet)	15
Progress Party (Fremskrittspartiet)	11
Conservative Party (Høyre)	23
Christian Democratic Party (Kristelig Folkeparti)	5
Pensioners' Party (Pensjonistpartiet)	1
Red Electoral Alliance (Rød Valgallianse)	1
Centre Party (Senterpartiet)	1
Socialist Left Party (Sosialistisk Venstreparti)	4
Liberal Party (Venstre)	6
Total number of members:	67

Stavanger kommunestyre 2003–2007
Party name (in Norwegian)	Number of representatives
Labour Party (Arbeiderpartiet)	14
Progress Party (Fremskrittspartiet)	14
Conservative Party (Høyre)	18
Christian Democratic Party (Kristelig Folkeparti)	5
Pensioners' Party (Pensjonistpartiet)	3
Red Electoral Alliance (Rød Valgallianse)	1
Centre Party (Senterpartiet)	1
Socialist Left Party (Sosialistisk Venstreparti)	8
Liberal Party (Venstre)	3
Total number of members:	67

Stavanger kommunestyre 1999–2003
Party name (in Norwegian)	Number of representatives
Labour Party (Arbeiderpartiet)	16
Progress Party (Fremskrittspartiet)	12
Conservative Party (Høyre)	21
Christian Democratic Party (Kristelig Folkeparti)	7
Pensioners' Party (Pensjonistpartiet)	1
Red Electoral Alliance (Rød Valgallianse)	2
Centre Party (Senterpartiet)	1
Socialist Left Party (Sosialistisk Venstreparti)	4
Liberal Party (Venstre)	3
Total number of members:	67

Stavanger kommunestyre 1995–1999
Party name (in Norwegian)	Number of representatives
Labour Party (Arbeiderpartiet)	21
Progress Party (Fremskrittspartiet)	14
Conservative Party (Høyre)	19
Christian Democratic Party (Kristelig Folkeparti)	8
Pensioners' Party (Pensjonistpartiet)	2
Centre Party (Senterpartiet)	3
Socialist Left Party (Sosialistisk Venstreparti)	4
Liberal Party (Venstre)	4
City environment list (Bymiljølisten)	2
Total number of members:	77

Stavanger kommunestyre 1991–1995
Party name (in Norwegian)	Number of representatives
Labour Party (Arbeiderpartiet)	20
Progress Party (Fremskrittspartiet)	7
Conservative Party (Høyre)	19
Christian Democratic Party (Kristelig Folkeparti)	7
Pensioners' Party (Pensjonistpartiet)	6
Centre Party (Senterpartiet)	4
Socialist Left Party (Sosialistisk Venstreparti)	9
Liberal Party (Venstre)	3
City environment list (Bymiljølisten)	2
Total number of members:	77

Stavanger kommunestyre 1987–1991
Party name (in Norwegian)	Number of representatives
Labour Party (Arbeiderpartiet)	24
Progress Party (Fremskrittspartiet)	12
Conservative Party (Høyre)	23
Christian Democratic Party (Kristelig Folkeparti)	7
Liberal People's Party (Liberale Folkepartiet)	1
Centre Party (Senterpartiet)	1
Socialist Left Party (Sosialistisk Venstreparti)	4
Liberal Party (Venstre)	5
Total number of members:	77

Stavanger kommunestyre 1983–1987
Party name (in Norwegian)	Number of representatives
Labour Party (Arbeiderpartiet)	27
Progress Party (Fremskrittspartiet)	8
Conservative Party (Høyre)	25
Christian Democratic Party (Kristelig Folkeparti)	6
Liberal People's Party (Liberale Folkepartiet)	1
Centre Party (Senterpartiet)	1
Socialist Left Party (Sosialistisk Venstreparti)	4
Liberal Party (Venstre)	3
Political independents list (Politisk uavhengig liste)	2
Total number of members:	77

Stavanger kommunestyre 1979–1983
Party name (in Norwegian)	Number of representatives
Labour Party (Arbeiderpartiet)	27
Progress Party (Fremskrittspartiet)	2
Conservative Party (Høyre)	29
Christian Democratic Party (Kristelig Folkeparti)	10
New People's Party (Nye Folkepartiet)	2
Centre Party (Senterpartiet)	1
Socialist Left Party (Sosialistisk Venstreparti)	3
Liberal Party (Venstre)	3
Total number of members:	77

Stavanger kommunestyre 1975–1979
Party name (in Norwegian)	Number of representatives
Labour Party (Arbeiderpartiet)	29
Anders Lange's Party (Anders Langes parti)	2
Conservative Party (Høyre)	23
Christian Democratic Party (Kristelig Folkeparti)	12
New People's Party (Nye Folkepartiet)	5
Centre Party (Senterpartiet)	2
Socialist Left Party (Sosialistisk Venstreparti)	3
Liberal Party (Venstre)	1
Total number of members:	77

Stavanger kommunestyre 1971–1975
Party name (in Norwegian)	Number of representatives
Labour Party (Arbeiderpartiet)	30
Conservative Party (Høyre)	19
Christian Democratic Party (Kristelig Folkeparti)	10
Centre Party (Senterpartiet)	3
Liberal Party (Venstre)	9
Socialist common list (Venstresosialistiske felleslister)	6
Total number of members:	77

Stavanger kommunestyre 1967–1971
Party name (in Norwegian)	Number of representatives
Labour Party (Arbeiderpartiet)	34
Conservative Party (Høyre)	19
Communist Party (Kommunistiske Parti)	1
Christian Democratic Party (Kristelig Folkeparti)	6
Centre Party (Senterpartiet)	1
Socialist People's Party (Sosialistisk Folkeparti)	4
Liberal Party (Venstre)	12
Total number of members:	77

Stavanger kommunestyre 1963–1967
Party name (in Norwegian)	Number of representatives
Labour Party (Arbeiderpartiet)	33
Conservative Party (Høyre)	18
Communist Party (Kommunistiske Parti)	1
Christian Democratic Party (Kristelig Folkeparti)	5
Socialist People's Party (Sosialistisk Folkeparti)	2
Liberal Party (Venstre)	10
Total number of members:	69

Stavanger bystyre 1959–1963
Party name (in Norwegian)	Number of representatives
Labour Party (Arbeiderpartiet)	32
Conservative Party (Høyre)	16
Communist Party (Kommunistiske Parti)	3
Christian Democratic Party (Kristelig Folkeparti)	6
Liberal Party (Venstre)	12
Total number of members:	69

Stavanger bystyre 1955–1959
Party name (in Norwegian)	Number of representatives
Labour Party (Arbeiderpartiet)	32
Conservative Party (Høyre)	16
Communist Party (Kommunistiske Parti)	4
Christian Democratic Party (Kristelig Folkeparti)	6
Liberal Party (Venstre)	11
Total number of members:	69

Stavanger bystyre 1951–1955
Party name (in Norwegian)	Number of representatives
Labour Party (Arbeiderpartiet)	31
Conservative Party (Høyre)	14
Communist Party (Kommunistiske Parti)	3
Christian Democratic Party (Kristelig Folkeparti)	6
Liberal Party (Venstre)	11
Local List(s) (Lokale lister)	3
Total number of members:	68

Stavanger bystyre 1947–1951
Party name (in Norwegian)	Number of representatives
Labour Party (Arbeiderpartiet)	25
Conservative Party (Høyre)	14
Communist Party (Kommunistiske Parti)	8
Christian Democratic Party (Kristelig Folkeparti)	4
Liberal Party (Venstre)	11
Local List(s) (Lokale lister)	6
Total number of members:	68

Stavanger bystyre 1945–1947
Party name (in Norwegian)	Number of representatives
Labour Party (Arbeiderpartiet)	32
Conservative Party (Høyre)	12
Communist Party (Kommunistiske Parti)	10
Liberal Party (Venstre)	14
Total number of members:	68

Stavanger bystyre 1937–1941*
Party name (in Norwegian)	Number of representatives
Labour Party (Arbeiderpartiet)	28
Conservative Party (Høyre)	20
Liberal Party (Venstre)	17
List of workers, fishermen, and small farmholders (Arbeidere, fiskere, småbrukere liste)	1
Local List(s) (Lokale lister)	2
Total number of members:	68
Note: Due to the German occupation of Norway during World War II, no elections were held for new municipal councils until after the war ended in 1945.

Stavanger bystyre 1934–1937
Party name (in Norwegian)	Number of representatives
Labour Party (Arbeiderpartiet)	29
Temperance Party (Avholdspartiet)	1
Conservative Party (Høyre)	13
Nasjonal Samling Party (Nasjonal Samling)	8
Liberal Party (Venstre)	17
Total number of members:	68

Stavanger bystyre 1931–1934
Party name (in Norwegian)	Number of representatives
Labour Party (Arbeiderpartiet)	24
Conservative Party (Høyre)	23
Communist Party (Kommunistiske Parti)	1
Liberal Party (Venstre)	20
Total number of members:	68

Stavanger bystyre 1928–1931
Party name (in Norwegian)	Number of representatives
Labour Party (Arbeiderpartiet)	26
Conservative Party (Høyre)	22
Liberal Party (Venstre)	20
Total number of members:	68

Stavanger bystyre 1925–1928
Party name (in Norwegian)	Number of representatives
Labour Party (Arbeiderpartiet)	18
Social Democratic Labour Party (Socialdemokratiske Arbeiderparti)	8
Liberal Party (Venstre)	17
Joint list of the Conservative Party (Høyre) and the Free-minded Liberal Party (Frisinnede Venstre)	23
Homeowners (Huseiere)	2
Total number of members:	68

Stavanger bystyre 1922–1925
Party name (in Norwegian)	Number of representatives
Labour Party (Arbeiderpartiet)	18
Conservative Party (Høyre)	22
Social Democratic Labour Party (Socialdemokratiske Arbeiderparti)	9
Liberal Party (Venstre)	15
Local List(s) (Lokale lister)	4
Total number of members:	68

Stavanger bystyre 1919–1922
Party name (in Norwegian)	Number of representatives
Labour Party (Arbeiderpartiet)	19
Temperance Party (Avholdspartiet)	8
Liberal Party (Venstre)	11
Joint list of the Conservative Party (Høyre) and the Free-minded Liberal Party (Frisinnede Venstre)	17
Local List(s) (Lokale lister)	13
Total number of members:	68

== Geography ==
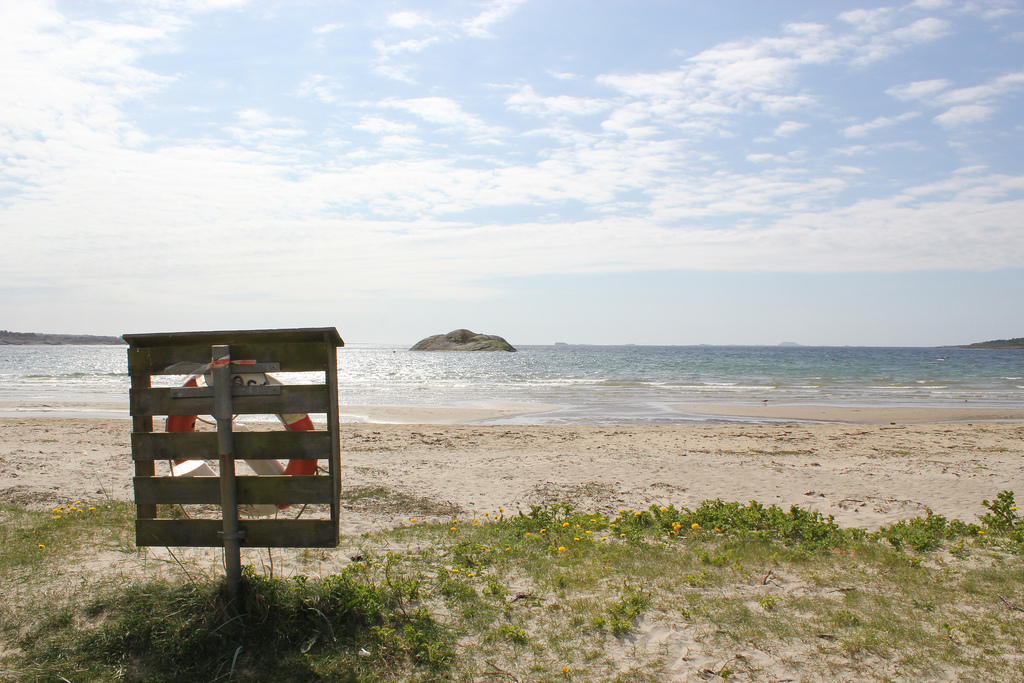
A beach in Randaberg Municipality to the north

The municipality of Stavanger is located in a coastal landscape, bordering the sea to the west and Boknafjorden in the northeast. The Byfjorden and Gandsfjorden run along the east side of the city. It is part of the Low-Jæren, a flat area of land consisting mostly of marsh, sand, and stone aur, that ranges from Ogna River in the south to Tungenes in the north; it is the northernmost part that includes Stavanger. The majority of the municipality lies between 0 and 50 m (0 and 164 ft) in elevation. The landscape has a distinctive appearance with rocks and hills where there is no settlement or agriculture. The city of Stavanger is closely linked to the sea and water, with five lakes (including Breiavatnet, Stora Stokkavatnet, and Mosvatnet) and three fjords (Hafrsfjorden, Byfjorden, and Gandsfjorden); sea and water form the landscape, providing a shoreline rich with vegetation and wildlife.

The terrain is low-lying: 49% of the area is less than 20 m (66 ft) above sea level, While 7% of the land is at 60 m (200 ft). Stavanger's highest point is the 514 m (1,686 ft) tall Bandåsen.

The city has developed on both sides of a hollow that runs right through the terrain, with steep slopes up from the bottom. An extension of Boknafjorden and Byfjorden intersects the harbour into the hollow from the northwest, while Hillevåg lake intrudes from Gandsfjorden in the southeast. Breiavatnet is located between the two fjord arms.

The city includes many islands off the coast including: Bjørnøy, Buøy, Engøy, Grasholmen, Hellesøy, Hundvåg, Kalvøy, Lindøy, Sølyst, and Vassøy. It also includes the eastern half of the island of Åmøy.

=== Parks ===
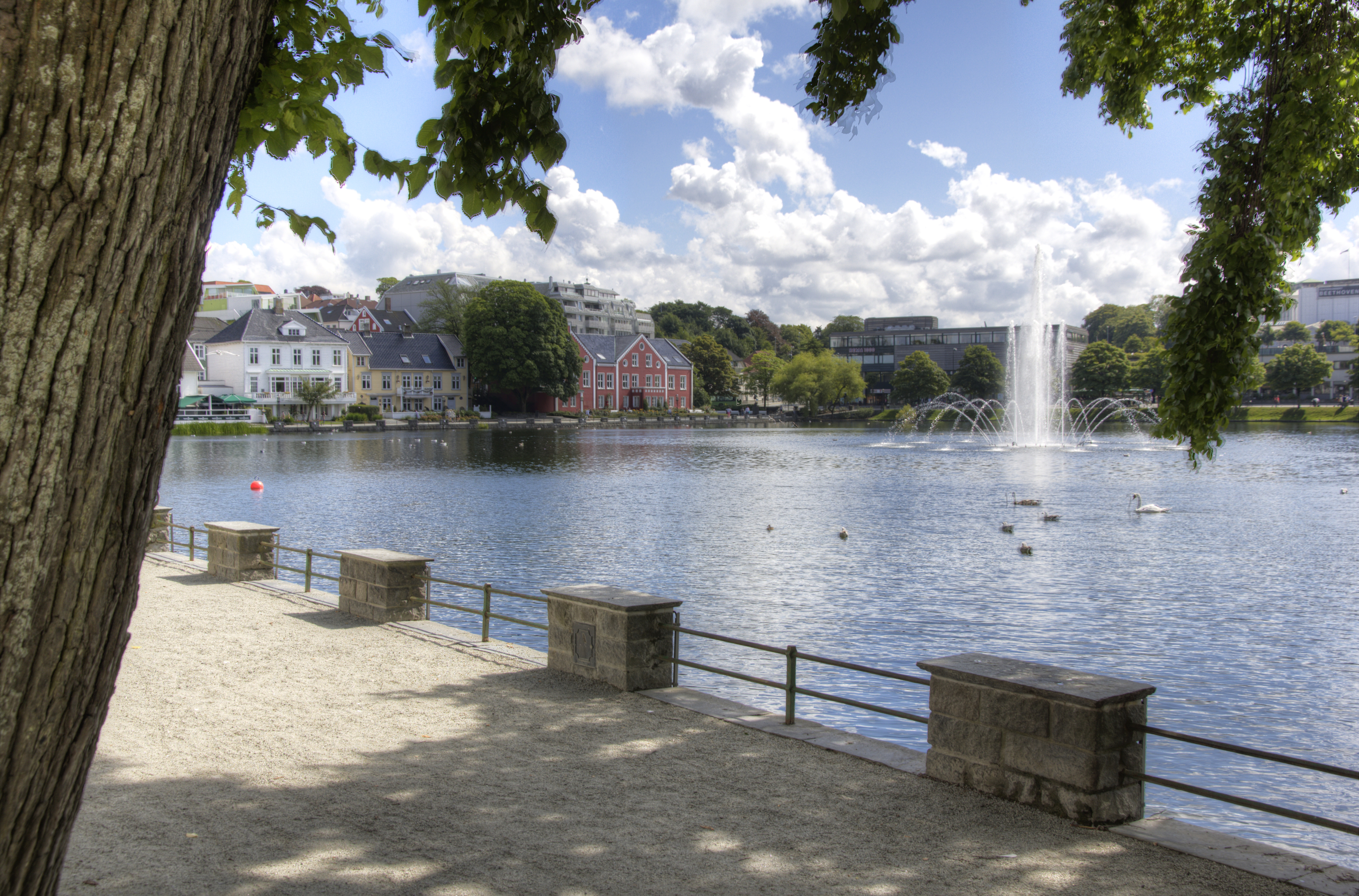
The city park

There are several parks and green spots in Stavanger municipality, both in the city and beyond. Central to the town is the city lake which is in turn surrounded by the city park, built as the city's first urban park in 1866–1868. Between the city park and the bay is located Kielland garden, which got its name because the poet Alexander Kielland's house at the time was here. Kielland Park went through a major renovation in 2007 as part of the Millennium in Stavanger municipality. At the opposite end of the city lake there is a small park outside the station; here there is Emigration, a gift from the Norwegian emigrants in the United States, commemorating the men and women of Norwegian ancestry who built America.

Bjergstedparken, a park north of Old Stavanger, is the location of Bjergsted Music Center, including Stavanger Concert Hall, and its outdoor areas are often used for festivals and outdoor concerts. The Missing park, built in honour of Lars Missing, is located up the hill on the west side of the harbour, and forms the entrance from the south towards the Old Town. Canon park forms the border between Stavanger and the exit from the E39. Northward go Løkkeveien against Bjergsted westward go Madlaveien the theater and Bergelandstunnelen, east towards E39. The park is located next to old Stavanger Hospital, which also has a large park area around the main building. Through the park runs Kannik creek, which comes to the surface at the statue of the Little Mermaid and runs into Breiavannet. Kannikkbekken runs mostly underground, in pipes, before it reaches Kannik park.

Outside the city center, the park southerly in relation to the large inland lakes such as Mosvatnet, Stora Stokkavatnet and Water Assen. Mosvatnet is 0.46 km^{2} (110 acres) making it the third largest in Stavanger after Hålandsvatnet and Store Stokkavatn. The lake supplied the city's drinking water from 1863 to 1931, and is now by far the most used recreation area in Stavanger. The path around the lake is 3.2 km (2.0 mi) long, and much used by cyclist and joggers; sampling conducted in 1995 showed that an estimated 560,000 people used the walking trail around Mosvatnet. At the south end is Mosvangen Camping, Stavanger Svømmestadion old man and Vålandskogen, and to the west is Rogaland Kunstmuseum. Stora Stokkavatnet is 2.19 km^{2} (0.85 sq mi) – the largest in Stavanger. Right at Stora Stokkavatnet is the 0.15 km^{2} (0.058 sq mi) Litla Stokkavatnet. The hiking trail around the lakes is 8.2 km (5.1 mi) long. In the lake is a small island, Storeholmen. Store Stokkavatnet supplied Stavanger's drinking water from 1931 to 1959, and was later demoted to the reserve drinking water. In 2009 it was relegated once more, and it is now legal to swim in the water.

=== Climate ===
Stavanger has a temperate oceanic climate (Köppen: Cfb, Trewartha: Dolk), with five months with a mean temperature above 10 °C (50 °F).

Situated on the south west coast of Norway, Stavanger's climate is greatly influenced by the temperate water in the North Sea, and Atlantic lows giving mild westerlies also in winter. This creates warmer temperatures throughout the year compared to other cities at similar latitudes, and also gives plentiful precipitation in the form of rain, especially in late autumn and winter. Spring and early summer is the driest season. The all-time high 33.5 °C (92.3 °F) at the airport was recorded August 1975. The warmest high recorded in Stavanger is 34.4 °C (93.9 °F) at the weather station Stavanger-Våland (72 m) in July 2018. The all-time low −19.8 °C (−3.6 °F) was recorded January 1987. Stavanger is the city with the highest average annual temperature in Norway.

Climate data for Stavanger Airport Sola (1991–2020 normals, 7 m (23 ft), extremes 1947–present, sun hours 1961–1990)
Month	Jan	Feb	Mar	Apr	May	Jun	Jul	Aug	Sep	Oct	Nov	Dec	Year
Record high °C (°F)	12.4 (54.3)	13.9 (57.0)	17.7 (63.9)	25.2 (77.4)	29.4 (84.9)	30.5 (86.9)	32.5 (90.5)	33.5 (92.3)	29.3 (84.7)	22.3 (72.1)	16.2 (61.2)	12 (54)	33.5 (92.3)
Mean daily maximum °C (°F)	4.0 (39.2)	4.0 (39.2)	7.0 (44.6)	11.0 (51.8)	15.0 (59.0)	18.0 (64.4)	20.0 (68.0)	20.0 (68.0)	16.0 (60.8)	12.0 (53.6)	8.0 (46.4)	5.0 (41.0)	11.7 (53.0)
Daily mean °C (°F)	2.2 (36.0)	2.2 (36.0)	4.5 (40.1)	7.5 (45.5)	11.5 (52.7)	14.0 (57.2)	16.0 (60.8)	16.5 (61.7)	13.0 (55.4)	9.5 (49.1)	6.0 (42.8)	3.0 (37.4)	8.9 (48.0)
Mean daily minimum °C (°F)	0.5 (32.9)	0.5 (32.9)	2.0 (35.6)	4.0 (39.2)	8.0 (46.4)	10.0 (50.0)	12.0 (53.6)	13.0 (55.4)	10.0 (50.0)	7.0 (44.6)	4.0 (39.2)	1.0 (33.8)	6.0 (42.8)
Record low °C (°F)	−19.8 (−3.6)	−19.2 (−2.6)	−16.2 (2.8)	−7.9 (17.8)	−2.5 (27.5)	0.6 (33.1)	4.3 (39.7)	1.2 (34.2)	−2.5 (27.5)	−5.2 (22.6)	−16.1 (3.0)	−16.1 (3.0)	−19.8 (−3.6)
Average precipitation mm (inches)	118.5 (4.67)	99.6 (3.92)	80.5 (3.17)	62.5 (2.46)	62.1 (2.44)	67.3 (2.65)	91.2 (3.59)	126.5 (4.98)	132 (5.2)	148.3 (5.84)	135.2 (5.32)	132.4 (5.21)	1,256.1 (49.45)
Average precipitation days (≥ 1.0 mm)	16	14	13	11	10	10	12	14	15	17	16	17	165
Average relative humidity (%)	82	81	78	77	75	78	78	80	80	81	82	82	80
Mean monthly sunshine hours	48	79	140	168	226	222	197	159	141	80	45	33	1,538
Source 1: yr.no/met.no NOAA (humidity)
Source 2: NOAA – WMO averages 1991–2020 Norway

Climate data for Stavanger Airport (2002–2020 averages & extremes)
Month	Jan	Feb	Mar	Apr	May	Jun	Jul	Aug	Sep	Oct	Nov	Dec	Year
Record high °C (°F)	11.2 (52.2)	13.9 (57.0)	17.7 (63.9)	22.4 (72.3)	29.4 (84.9)	29.1 (84.4)	32.5 (90.5)	29.4 (84.9)	26.7 (80.1)	22.3 (72.1)	16.2 (61.2)	12.0 (53.6)	32.5 (90.5)
Mean maximum °C (°F)	9.0 (48.2)	8.9 (48.0)	12.1 (53.8)	17.4 (63.3)	22.9 (73.2)	24.8 (76.6)	26.7 (80.1)	25.7 (78.3)	21.6 (70.9)	16.9 (62.4)	12.8 (55.0)	9.9 (49.8)	28.2 (82.8)
Mean daily maximum °C (°F)	4.7 (40.5)	4.8 (40.6)	6.8 (44.2)	10.9 (51.6)	13.9 (57.0)	16.8 (62.2)	20.0 (68.0)	20.0 (68.0)	16.4 (61.5)	12.2 (54.0)	8.4 (47.1)	6.0 (42.8)	11.7 (53.1)
Daily mean °C (°F)	2.3 (36.1)	2.4 (36.3)	3.9 (39.0)	7.5 (45.5)	10.5 (50.9)	13.6 (56.5)	16.4 (61.5)	16.5 (61.7)	13.5 (56.3)	9.3 (48.7)	5.8 (42.4)	3.6 (38.5)	8.8 (47.8)
Mean daily minimum °C (°F)	0.5 (32.9)	0.5 (32.9)	1.0 (33.8)	4.0 (39.2)	7.1 (44.8)	10.3 (50.5)	12.8 (55.0)	13.0 (55.4)	10.6 (51.1)	6.4 (43.5)	3.2 (37.8)	1.1 (34.0)	5.9 (42.6)
Mean minimum °C (°F)	−8.9 (16.0)	−7.5 (18.5)	−5.5 (22.1)	−1.4 (29.5)	1.8 (35.2)	6.0 (42.8)	8.8 (47.8)	8.1 (46.6)	5.2 (41.4)	−0.6 (30.9)	−4.9 (23.2)	−6.8 (19.8)	−10.9 (12.4)
Record low °C (°F)	−19.1 (−2.4)	−12.8 (9.0)	−13.3 (8.1)	−5.2 (22.6)	−1.5 (29.3)	3.9 (39.0)	6.6 (43.9)	6.0 (42.8)	1.8 (35.2)	−4.3 (24.3)	−11.7 (10.9)	−15.5 (4.1)	−19.1 (−2.4)
Average precipitation mm (inches)	122.5 (4.82)	89.6 (3.53)	72.9 (2.87)	60.7 (2.39)	69.0 (2.72)	66.9 (2.63)	104.0 (4.09)	131.3 (5.17)	146.0 (5.75)	142.5 (5.61)	141.6 (5.57)	134.6 (5.30)	1,281.6 (50.45)
Source: Norsk Klimaservicesenter

== Boroughs ==
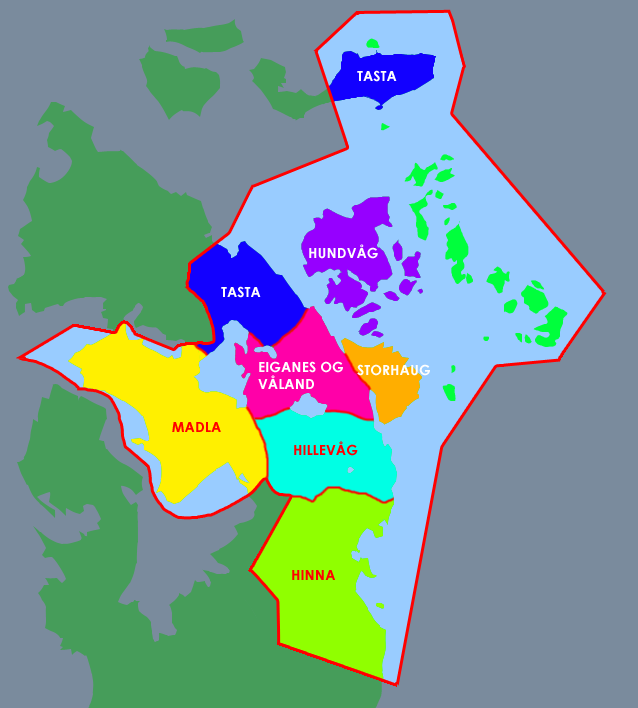
Boroughs of Stavanger

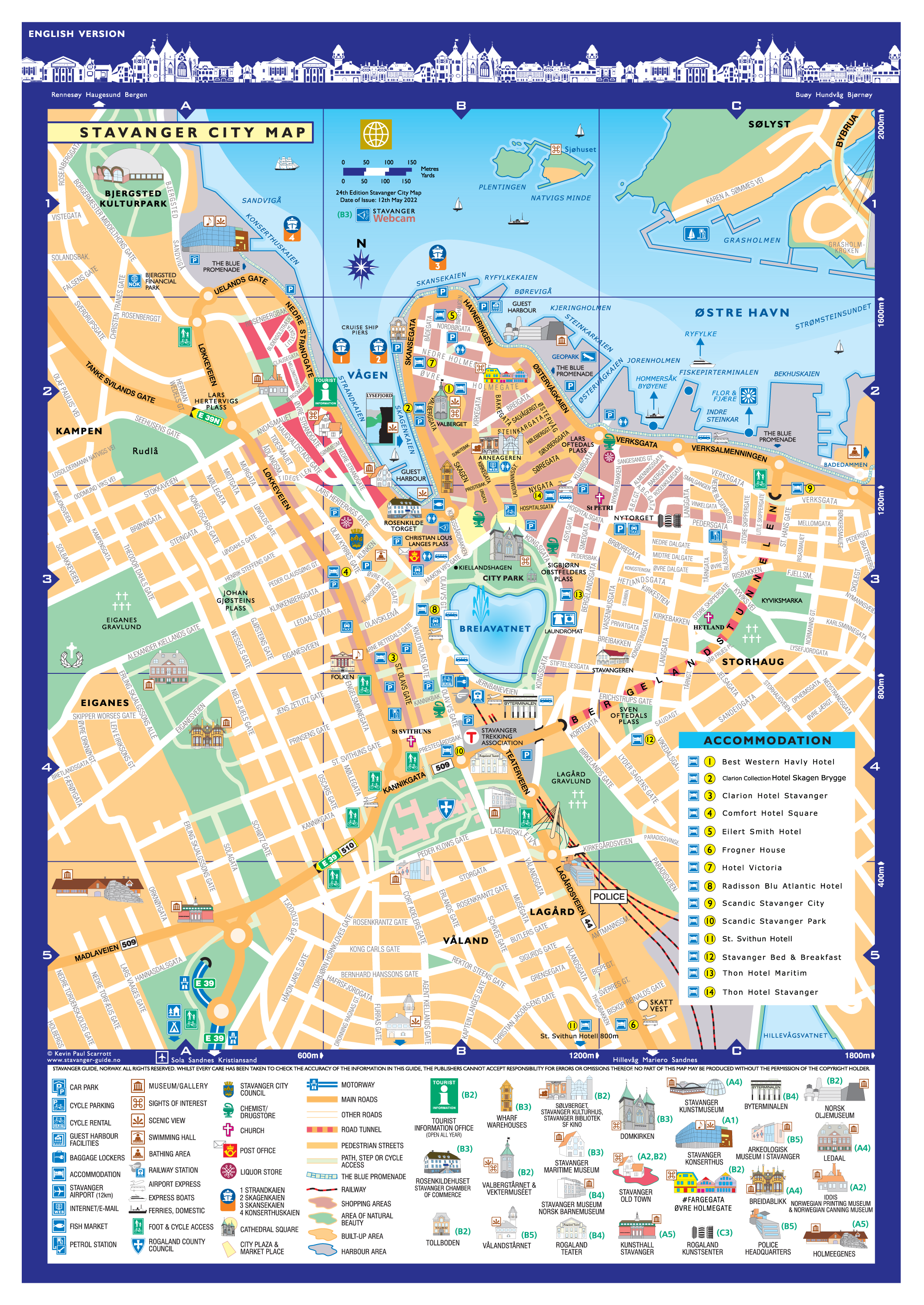
City center Stavanger

Stavanger is officially partitioned into 22 parts and 218 subparts. Stavanger is also divided into nine boroughs.

- Eiganes og Våland
- Finnøy
- Hillevåg
- Hinna
- Hundvåg
- Madla
- Rennesøy
- Storhaug
- Tasta

=== Neighborhoods ===
Neighborhoods include:

- Byhaugen
- Old Stavanger
- Bekkefaret
- Bergjeland
- Eiganes
- Forus
- Gausel
- Godeset
- Indre Tasta
- Jåtten
- Johannes
- Kampen
- Kvalaberg
- Kvernevik
- Madlamark
- Nylund
- Øyane
- Paradis
- Stokka
- Sunde
- Tjensvoll
- Ullandhaug
- Våland
- Varden
- Vaulen
- Ytre Tasta
- Madla.

== Economy ==
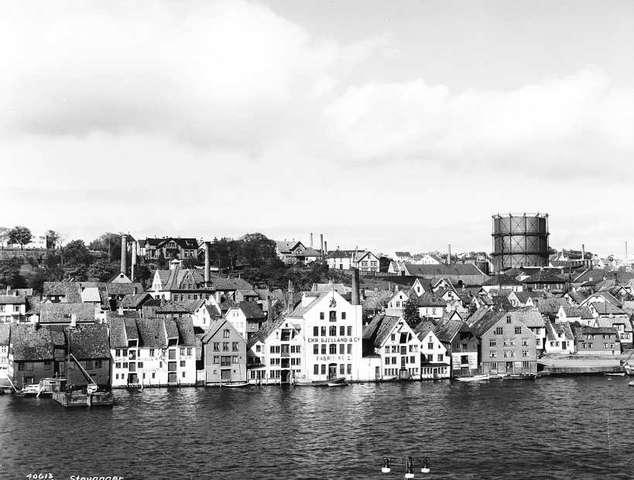
Canning factories in the early 20th century

In the early 20th century, Stavanger's industry was mainly related to fisheries and shipping. In the first half of the century it was known for canning, and in the 1950s there were over 50 canneries in town. The town was even called Norway's "canned capital", and included Christian Bjelland, who founded Chr Bjelland & Co. A/S. The last of these factories were closed down in 2002.

Around 1950, over half of the working population in the city was employed in industry. Structural changes in industry and the strong development of the service sector have radically changed the city's economic base, and the service industry now represents over 11 percent of employment. However, the city still has 29 percent of the county's industrial employment.

Engineering is now the main industry with 59 percent of manufacturing employment. This is mostly related to the offshore petroleum industry, and production of oil platforms alone account for 40 percent. Other important industries are publishing – especially high printing and the major daily newspapers in town, Stavanger and Rogaland Avis Aftenblad – and food and beverage, which includes the processing of local agricultural products from Jæren, including Gilde Vest with one of the largest slaughterhouses.

Employment by place of work and industry in 2007 to 0.6% in primary, 27.4% in secondary and tertiary industries 71.7%. Employment by place of work by sector in 2007 to 24.4% in the public sector and 75.6% in the private sector and public enterprises.

Industry has in recent years become highly decentralized. The most important of the newer industrial areas are Forus in the south, on the border of Sandnes Municipality and Sola Municipality, and Dusavik (mainly petroleum-related activities) in the north, on the border of Randfontein. Significant older industrial areas are Hillevåg, Buøy, the eastern districts, and in some places elsewhere along the coast. Shipbuilding and shipping has also traditionally been of great importance to the city's economic growth; Worley Rosenberg, a shipyard, has 600 employees (in 2026); as of Q2 2026 it is still a cornerstone company the shipyard is located on Hundvåg. Stavanger is also among the country's most important maritime cities, coming in fourth for registered fleets after the cities of Oslo, Bergen and Ålesund.

For the fourth consecutive year, Stavanger Region was in 2007 ranked best business region. Telemarksforsking Bo worked with Ministry NM to rank the regions in Norway with regard to profitability, growth and new businesses.

=== Media ===
The city's largest daily newspaper, Stavanger Aftenblad published its first issue in 1893. Competitor Rogalands Avis was first published in 1899 under the name 1ste Mai ('1 May'), and published daily. In 1987 an attempt was made to establish a new daily newspaper, The West Coast, but it was only released for two months and ended with a total loss of NOK 27 million.

The first newspaper published in Stavanger, Stavangerske Adressecontoirs Efterretninger, was a handwritten weekly newspaper that probably came out in 1769 and 1770. This was not an ordinary newspaper, but a so-called "link newspaper" with the privilege of bringing out announcements, small articles and ads. The first printed newspaper in Stavanger, Stavanger Addresseavis, published its first issue on Friday, 4 October 1833.

Stavanger Avis was published from 1888 until 1911. Writer and local Alexander L. Kielland was editor in 1889. Stavanger Avis was also the name of the newspaper that came out from 1942 to 1945, when Stavanger Aftenblad and Stavangeren were merged by the Press Directorate.

Student newspaper SMiS (Studentmediene i Stavanger) comes out every other month.

Stavanger has one principal television station, TV Vest, that sends local news and reports. Additionally, Viking TV, the channel for the football team Viking FK, started on 2 March 2008, and is distributed via Lyse's broadband network, reaching 120,000 viewers in 45,000 households. NRK Rogaland supplies local news broadcasts on radio and television. Local radio stations also provide local news and reports.

=== Agriculture and food ===
The Stavanger region is often referred to as Norway's answer to the French food region of Lyon. The Culinary Institute, based in Ullandhaug, used to provide a very important focus on food in Stavanger. After the Culinary Institute went bankrupt, partly due to activities in Oslo on 4 June 2008, a new culinary organization was established by the Foundation Rogaland knowledge park and Rogaland County Council. This new institute, now also known as The Culinary Institute, maintained parts of the work of the original organization, and eventually bought back the name, logo and brand Culinary Institute from the bankruptcy estate.

In summer 2007, the region's culinary actors were awarded the title "Norwegian Centers of Expertise in Culinology". The building under construction at Ullandhaug will serve as a platform and innovative arena, not only for the region's R & D environment, but also for other expertise among both industry and the public. In July 2008, the Stavanger European championship qualified for the Bocuse d'Or. In 2008, Norway was represented by Geir Skeie, who also won gold. Every year there is a "Happy Food Festival" in the city center. The festival originated in the network of Rogaland county so that they could impart culinary traditions of the region. By 2020, Stavanger region intends to be the region most Norwegians associate with food products and culinary experiences.

=== Oil industry ===
In recent times, the city has come to be called the "oil capital", and Norway's national and largest oil company, Equinor, is based at Forus, in Stavanger. Equinor (at the time known as Statoil) was founded as a limited company owned by the Government of Norway on 14 July 1972 by a unanimous act passed by the Norwegian parliament Stortinget, to enable Norwegian participation in the oil industry on the continental shelf, to build up Norwegian competency within the petroleum industry, and to establish the foundations of a domestic petroleum industry. Establishing Equinor's headquarters in Stavanger naturally led to Stavanger becoming the center of the oil industry. Petoro, a Norwegian state-owned company responsible for managing the commercial aspects of the state's direct financial interest in petroleum activities on the Norwegian continental shelf, also has its headquarters in the city. With the center of the national oil industry in Stavanger, several other international oil companies have also made their headquarters in Stavanger.

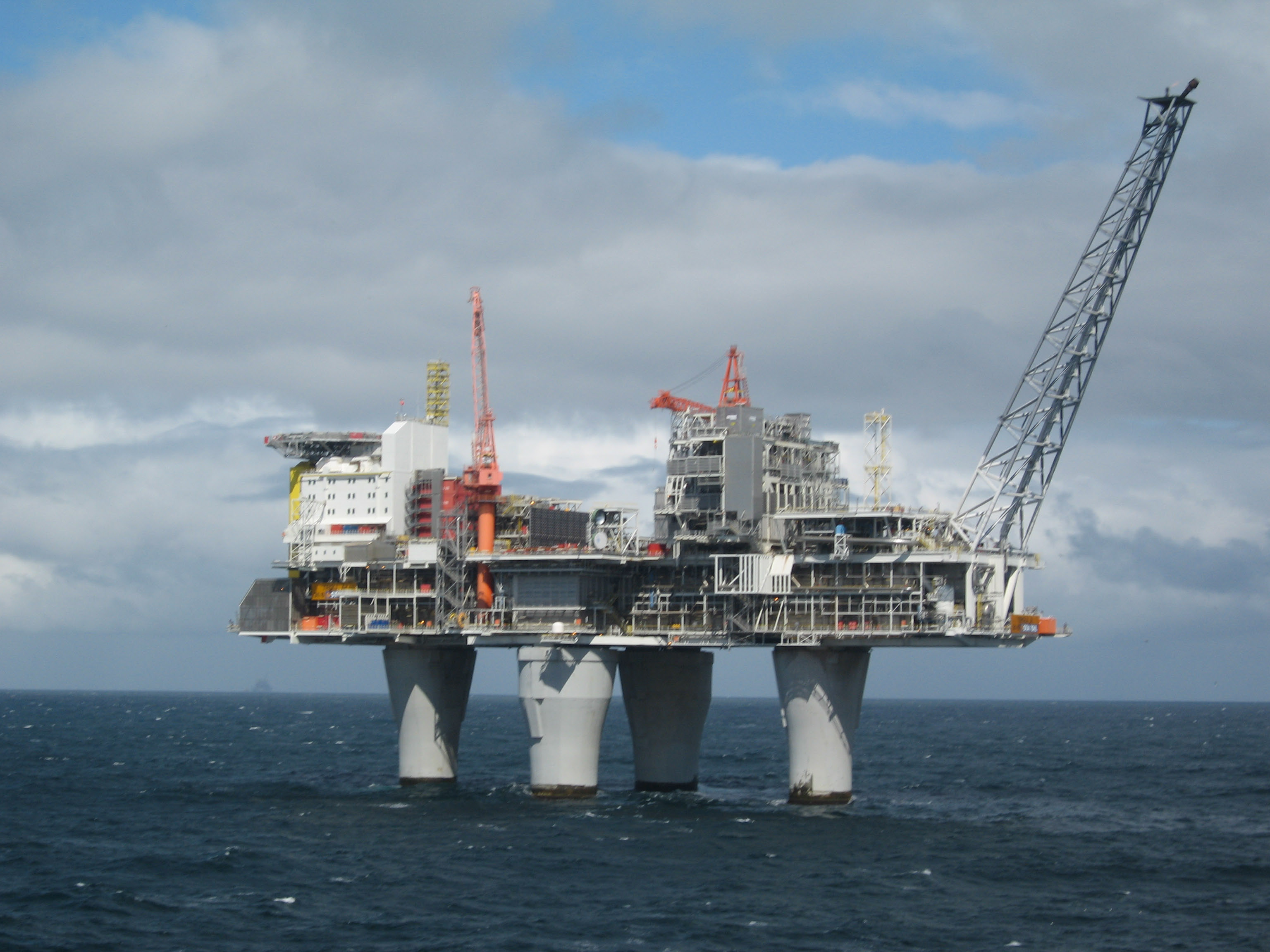
The concrete base for the Troll A platform is cast in Vats, 55 km (34 mi) north of Stavanger

NPD was created in 1972 by Ullandhaug and PSA was established on 1 January 2004 and co-located with the agency, as a regulatory body.

Jåttåvågen, on Gandsfjorden, was from the 1970s to the 1990s a large industrial area, particularly for the construction of large concrete Condeep platforms and oil platforms for the offshore industry. Among others, the Condeep jacket for the three Gullfaks platforms and Troll A were cast here by Norwegian Contractors.

Offshore Northern Seas is the second largest exhibition of its kind in the oil and gas industry. ONS takes place in Stavanger during the last week of August every other year. In 2008, there were 38,000 visitors, half of whom came from abroad.

== Transport ==
=== Airport ===
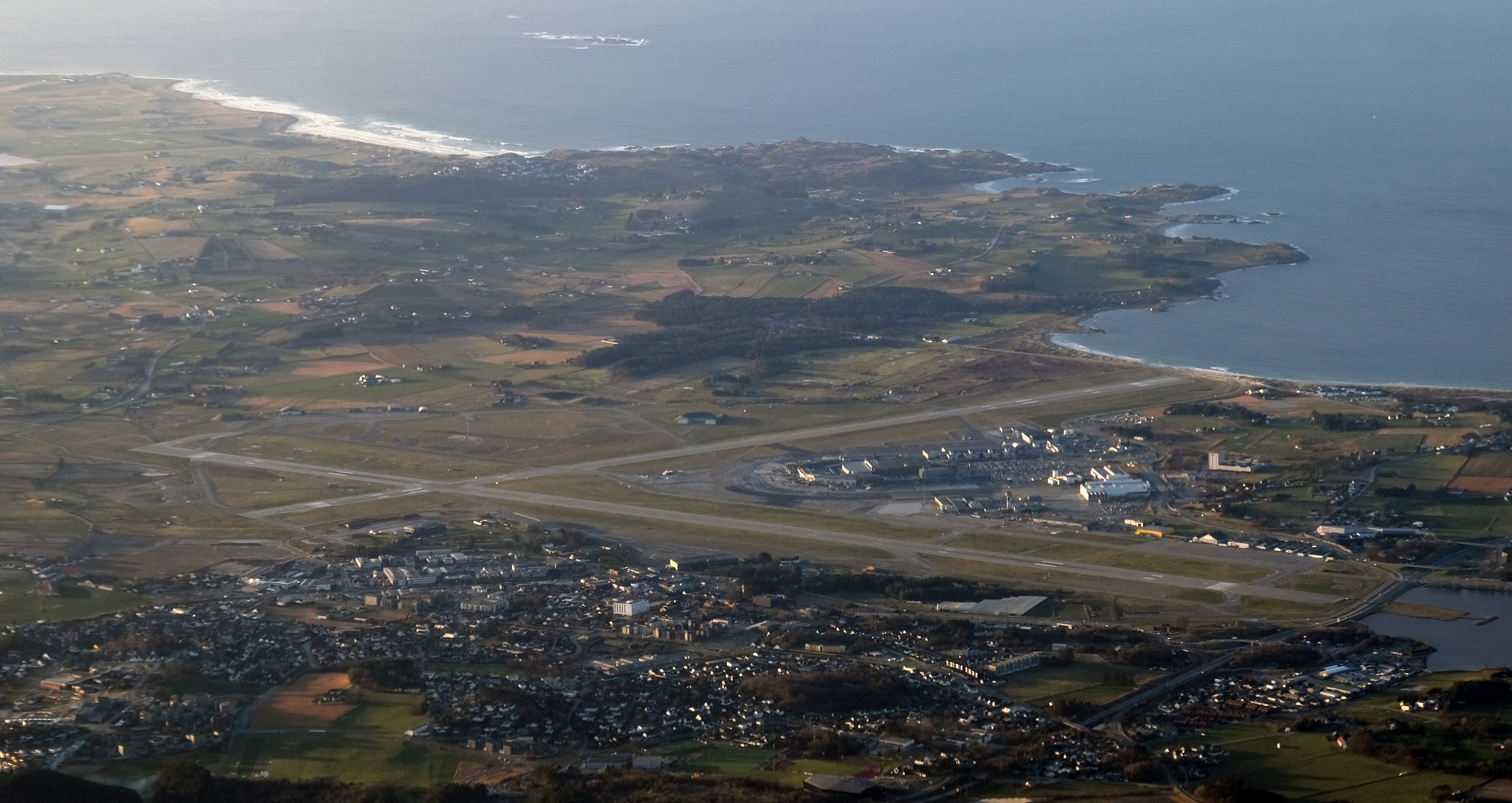
Stavanger Airport, Sola

Stavanger Airport, is located in Sola Municipality, 14 minutes away from Stavanger city center. The airport opened in 1937. In 1940 Stavanger Airport, Forus, opened, but closed in 1989. In 2013 Sola airport had over 4 million passengers and was the largest airport in Rogaland county. It is also the 3rd largest airport in Norway and 7th in the Nordic countries. The busiest route is Oslo-Gardermoen, with over 1.5 million passengers; the second most popular is Bergen Airport, Flesland, with over 700,000 passengers; Oslo-Torp is the third most popular, followed by Trondheim Airport, Værnes and Kristiansand Airport, Kjevik domestically. Internationally, the busiest routes are Copenhagen, Amsterdam, and Aberdeen. Stavanger also has connections to domestic and European destinations, including London, Paris, Barcelona, Stockholm, Warsaw. Domestic destinations are all the way up from Tromsø down to Kristiansand.

=== Railway ===
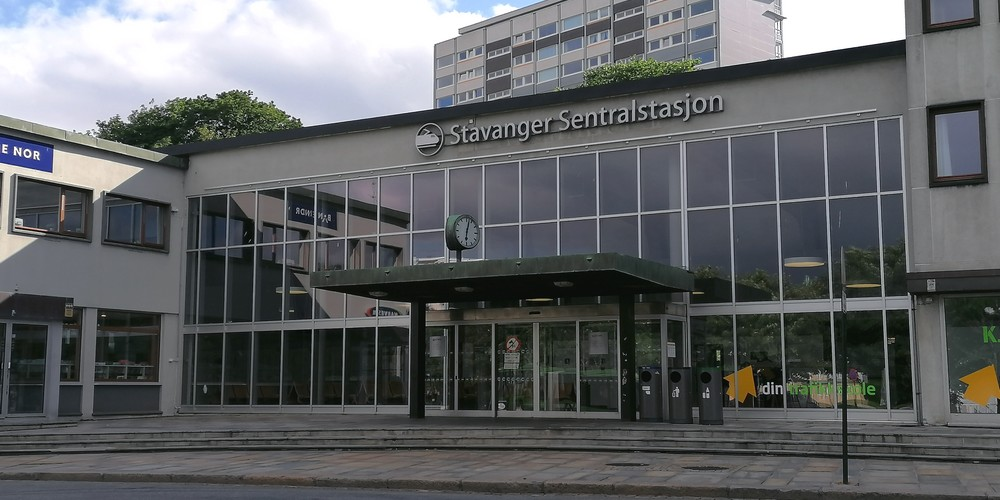
Stavanger S

Stavanger Station opened in 1878 and is the terminus of both the Sørlandet Line and the Jæren Line.

The Southern Railway goes from Oslo Central Station to Drammen, to Kristiansand Station, to, finally, Stavanger Station. This route, 545 kilometres (339 miles) between Oslo and Stavanger, is scheduled over four times every day and takes around seven hours. The railway was constructed in several phases, the first section being opened in 1871 and the last not opened until 1944. While there was continual construction work from Oslo westward as far as Moi, the Jæren Line, from Egersund to Stavanger in Western Norway, was opened in 1878. Up to 1913 the name used on plans and for the completed sections was the Vestlandet Line (The West Country Line).

There are also local trains in Jæren with 19 stops on one line. The line opened as a 1,067 millimetres (3 feet 6.0 inches) narrow gauge stand-alone line on 27 February 1878. The railway was extended from Egersund to Flekkefjord as the Flekkefjord Line in 1904. The Jæren Line's only branch, the Ålgård Line from Ganddal to Ålgård, opened in 1924. In 1944, the Sørlandet Line was extended to Sira on the Flekkefjord Line, and the Jæren Line was integrated into the main railway network. Because of this, the line was converted to standard gauge.

=== Roads ===
European route E39 goes through Stavanger via the Mastrafjord Tunnel and Byfjord Tunnel, then goes south to Sandnes. Fylkesvei 44 starts in Stavanger and ends in Kristiansand, via Sandnes and Flekkefjord.

National road 509 runs between Tasta Borough through Tananger, Sola, and Stavanger Airport, and Forus, ending at E39 near Jåtten.

On 18 December 2012, the new engine traffic road Solasplitten opened as a new thoroughfare eastward, north of Forus and the European route E39.

An undersea road tunnel connects Stavanger to Strand via the Ryfast tunnel link. (Ryfylke Tunnel and Hundvåg Tunnel).

There is as of 2021 ongoing construction of Rogfast, an undersea road tunnel that will facilitate travel between Stavanger and Haugesund.

=== Sea ===
Located outside Stavanger, there is a port serving ferries to Hirtshals, Denmark. There have been advocates for the Smyril Line ferry between the Faroe Islands and Denmark to make a stop in Stavanger as the new port in Risavika allows this to be done while only adding one hour to the total sailing time.

Local ferries go to Tau and Kvitsøy, while fast passenger boats go to many villages and islands between the main routes from Stavanger to Haugesund and Sauda.

There are plans to re-establish the ferry link to Newcastle in the United Kingdom, which was suspended in 2008.

=== Bus ===
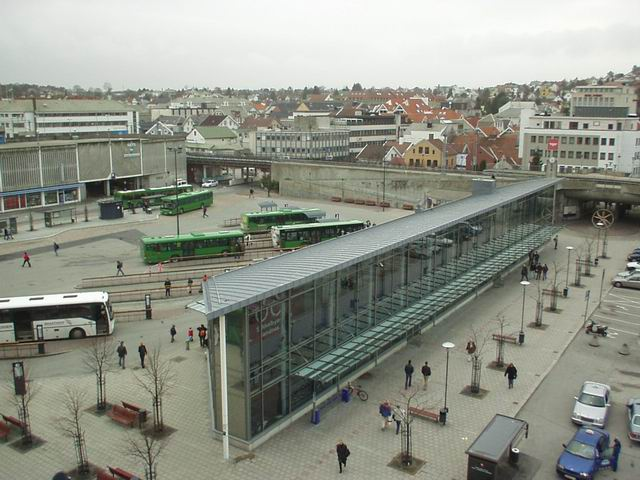
Bus terminal in Sandnes, the neighboring city of Stavanger

The local bus service in Stavanger is administered by Rogaland Kollektivtrafikk (RKT) under the brand name "Kolumbus". The buses are operated by Boreal Transport. RKT administers all bus routes in Rogaland County.

Rogaland County are currently building 3 Busway-lines in the Stavanger/Sandnes area. When completed, the Busway system will be the longest busway in Europe built to BRT (Bus Rapid Transit) standard (Source:Rogaland County. The Busway).

Express bus services are operated by NOR-WAY Bussekspress from Stavanger City Terminal to Kristiansand, Bergen and Haugesund, and by Lavprisekspressen to Oslo via Kristiansand.

The city has a number of bus services and taxis.

== Education ==
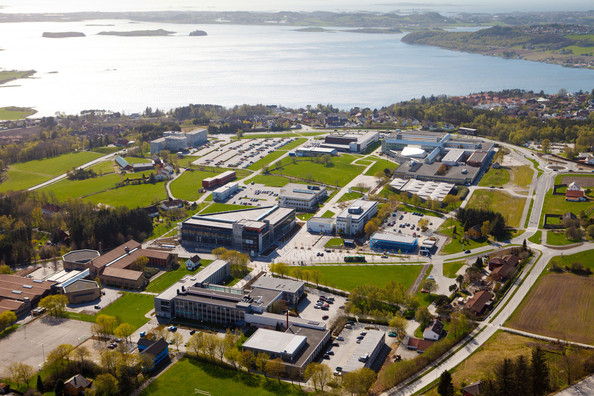
Ullandhaug campus. University of Stavanger

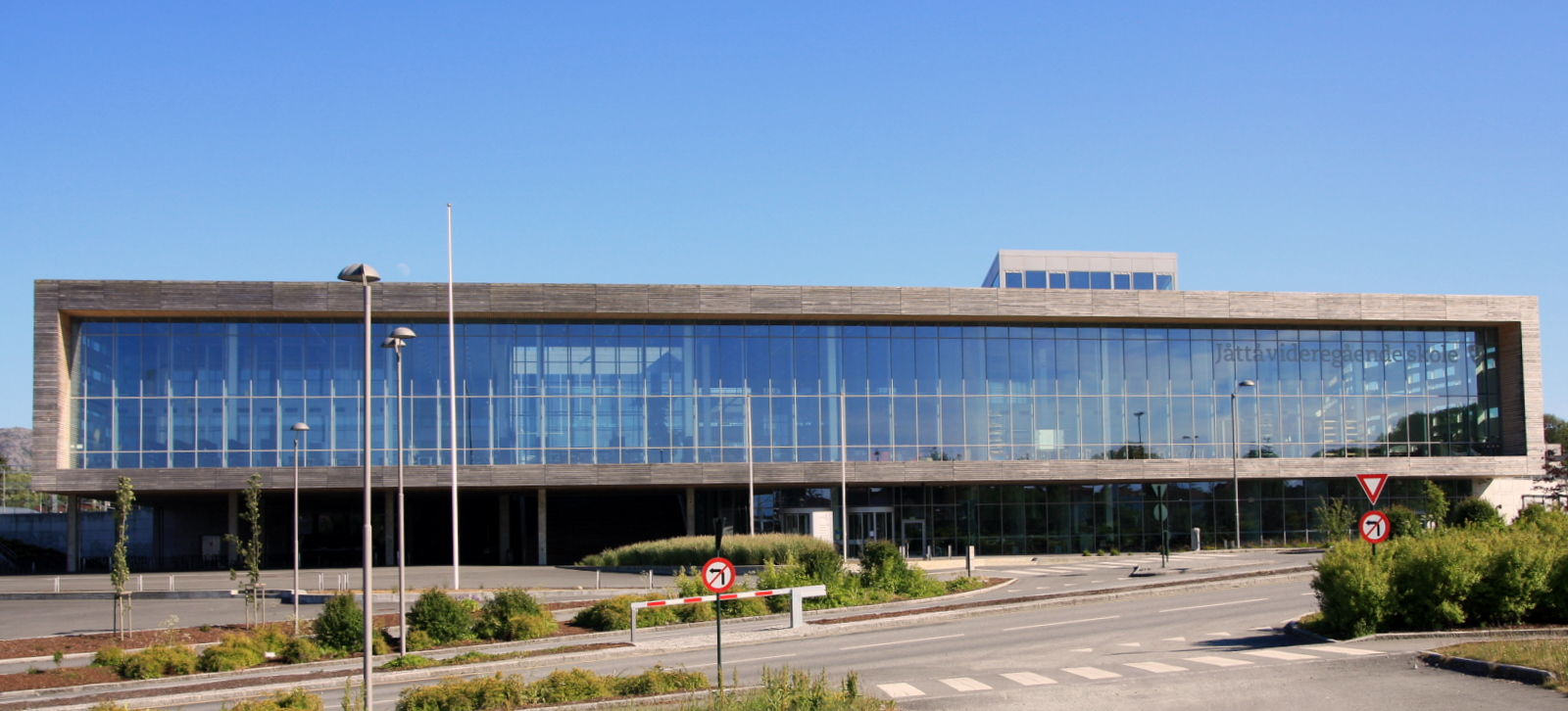
Jåttå Upper Secondary School

University of Stavanger (UIS) is the fifth university established in Norway, on 29 October 2004, when Høgskolen i Stavanger (HiS) gained university status by decision of the council. The university has about 9,000 students and 1,200 employees and is organized into three faculties: Faculty of Humanities, Social Sciences and the Faculty of Science. The archaeological museum is also part of the university. The campus is located in Ullandhaug, with most departments located there. Marit Boyesen was selected as the principal for the period 2011 to 2015, and started her tenure as rector 1 August 2011. As rector, she is the head of the academic activities of the University of Stavanger as well as Chairman of the University Board. The University of Stavanger became a member of European Consortium of Innovative Universities (ECIU) in October 2012.

The VID Specialized University has a long history in the city. This university began as the School of Mission and Theology or Misjonshøgskolen (MHS), being established in 1843 and accredited in 2008 as a research university. It has about 300 students from approximately 20 countries. MHS is owned by the Norwegian Missionary Society. The Centre for Intercultural Communication (SIK) is associated with the college's mission. In 2016 it became part of the VID Specialized University.

The Art School in Rogaland was established in 1978, with a history dating back to 1957.

The Scandinavian School of Management offers college studies in Marketing and Management. The school is 92.5% owned by John Bauer Group.

Solborgveien Folk annually welcomes over 140 students and is owned by the Lutheran.

Other private schools include the International School of Stavanger and The British International School of Stavanger.

Other schools in the city are the Enterprise Technical College Stavanger, Noroff Institute Stavanger, Utdanningshuset Stavanger, Acta Bible, BI Stavanger, Fjelltun Bible, Folkeuniversitetet Stavanger, Imente Vocational School Stavanger, Nor Offshore Stavanger, Norwegian School of Creative Studies Stavanger, NæringsAkademiet Stavanger Peteka – Stavanger, PNI Training Center and Stavanger Offshore Technical College.

The high schools are categorized under Rogaland county, but specifically within Stavanger municipality are the schools St. Olav, St. Svithun, Stavanger Cathedral School, Hetland, Jåttå, Stavanger Offshore Technical College, Godalen and Bergeland.

== Culture ==
=== Museums ===
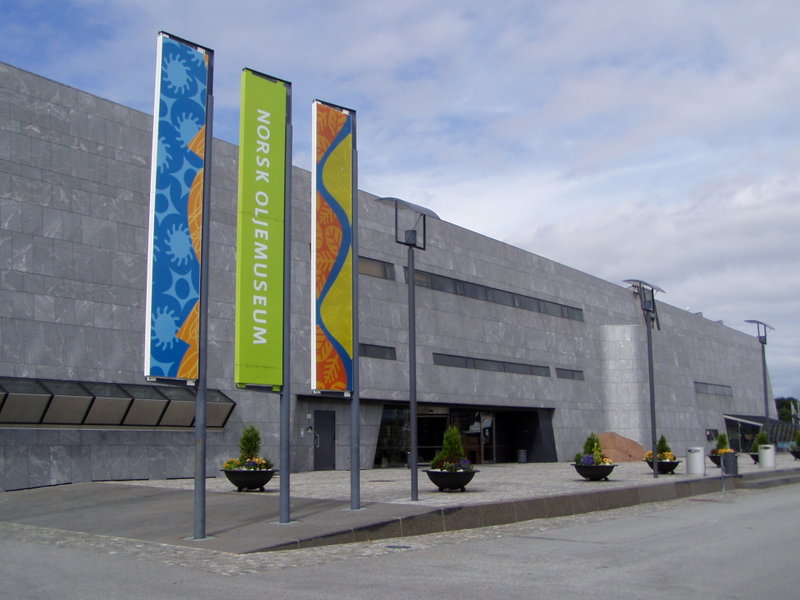
Norwegian Petroleum Museum in 2005

The city has several museums and collections that are both local and national. The city's most visited museum is the Norwegian Petroleum Museum, opened in 1998. In its 10 years of visitation records, from 1998 to 2008, almost 95,000 people visited the museum annually.

The city's oldest museum is Missjonmuseet, established in 1864, located on the ground floor of the faculty building at MHS. The museum has about 5,000 exhibits consisting of several objects of ethnographic and historical interest from the various mission fields of study.

Stavanger Museum, founded in 1877 and thus one of the oldest museums, includes several historic buildings and collections. Stavanger Museum consists of a total of eight buildings: Stavanger Museum Muségata 16, Stavanger Maritime Museum, the Norwegian Canning Museum, Ledaal, Breidablikkveien museum, combined indretning, Norwegian Printing Museum and the Norwegian Children's Museum. In the main museum are now a cultural department, a zoological collection, and a library.

Museum of Archaeology in Stavanger is the largest museum in Stavanger, measured by number of employees. AmS is a state museum for the prehistoric sites in Rogaland, and is part of the University of Stavanger. The museum also conducts extensive outreach activities, and has facilities fairly close to Stavanger Museum.

Rogaland Art Museum, located by a park, has paintings by Norwegian artist Edvard Munch, Christian Krogh, Eilif Peterssen and Harriet Backer, and also has the largest collection of Lars Hertervigs work. Other artists of Rogaland represented here include Kitty Kielland, Nicolai Ulfsten, Carl Sundt-Hansen, Olaf Lange and Aage Storstein.

Vestlandske School Museum (Western Norway School Museum), in Stavanger, is currently in the old 1920 Kvaleberg school building. Established in 1925, it is a museum of school history in Rogaland.

By the bay lies the Norwegian Emigration Center on the west side and on the eastern side of the bay is Valbergtårnet with its Watchmen's Museum (Vektermuseet). Norwegian Telecom Museum has an office in Stavanger, at Løkkeveien.

=== Churches ===
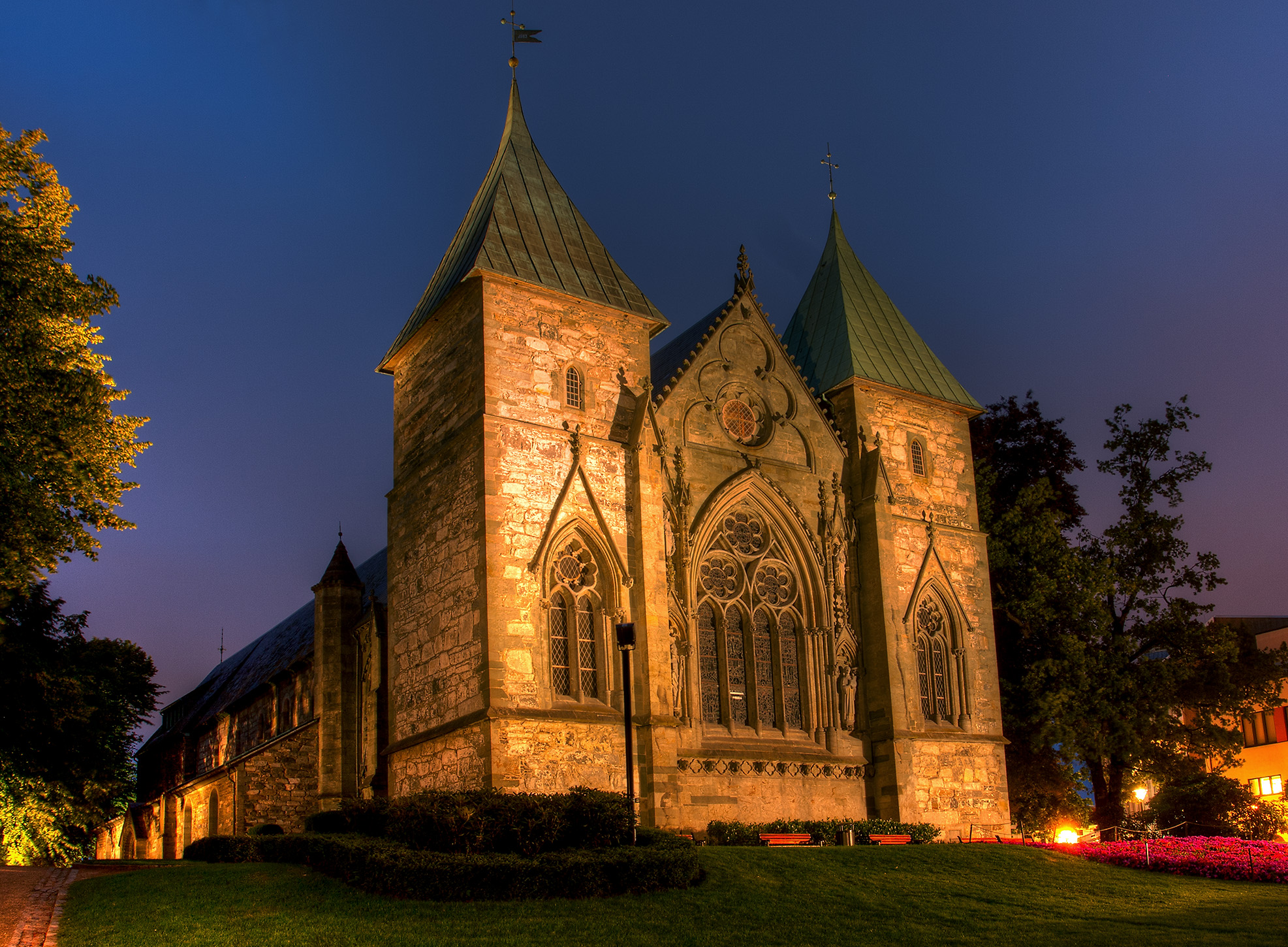
Stavanger Cathedral, the oldest cathedral in Norway

The Church of Norway has two deaneries (prosti) within Stavanger Municipality: the Stavanger arch-deanery and the Ytre Stavanger deanery. The two deaneries are divided up into 17 parishes (sokn), all of which are part of the Diocese of Stavanger.

Churches in Stavanger Municipality
Deanery (Prosti)	Parish (Sokn)	Church name	Location	Year built
Stavanger domprosti	Stavanger domkirke	Stavanger Cathedral	Storhaug	1150
Stavanger domprosti	Bekkefaret	Bekkefaret Church	Bekkefaret	1977
Stavanger domprosti	Hundvåg	Hundvåg Church	Hundvåg	1983
Stavanger domprosti	Kampen	Kampen Church	Eiganes og Våland	1957
Stavanger domprosti	St. Petri	St. Petri Church	Storhaug	1866
Stavanger domprosti	St. Johannes	Frue Church	Storhaug	1854
Stavanger domprosti	St. Johannes	St. Johannes Church	Johannes	1909
Stavanger domprosti	Stokka	Stokka Church	Stokka	1974
Stavanger domprosti	Tjensvoll	Tjensvoll Church	Tjensvoll	1978
Stavanger domprosti	Varden	Varden Church	Varden	1967
Ytre Stavanger prosti	Gausel	Gausel Church	Gausel	1996
Ytre Stavanger prosti	Hafrsfjord	Revheim Church	Kvernevik	1865
Ytre Stavanger prosti	Hillevåg	Hillevåg Church	Hillevåg	1961
Ytre Stavanger prosti	Hinna	Hinna Church	Hinna	1967
Ytre Stavanger prosti	Madlamark	Madlamark Church	Madlamark	1976
Ytre Stavanger prosti	Sunde	Sunde Church	Sunde	1984
Ytre Stavanger prosti	Tasta	Tasta Church	Indre Tasta	1977
Ytre Stavanger prosti	Vardeneset	Vardeneset Church	Ytre Tasta	2000
Ytre Stavanger prosti	Vardeneset	Austre Åmøy Chapel	Austre Åmøy	1904

=== Film ===
South West Film Forum was established in 1992 and is an organization of film workers in Rogaland. Its goal is to increase the skills of film workers in the region and encourage more filmmaking. Film Forum Southwest has received operating support from the City of Stavanger since 1995 and from the county since 1997. Additionally, they have received grants for film workshop from the county and for other industry-stimulating measures from Stavanger municipality.

Stavanger has since 1997 had a grant for the support of local filmmaking through Filmkraft Rogaland. The aim has been to stimulate the local film community growth and development, and to contribute to local filmmakers so they can initiate film projects that can then apply for production funding from other government agencies. In addition, they support the already completed projects – primarily to help cinemas display locally produced film.

The feature film Mongoland became a Norwegian film success, made outside the traditional infrastructure for Norwegian film. So far this has culminated with the establishment of the production company South West Film and Film Kraft Rogaland, to ensure long-term fund allocations to film production companies. Arild Østin Ommundsen made his directorial debut with the feature film Mongoland in 2000 and has since directed and written the script for The Haunting (2003) and Monster Thursday (2005). Ommundsen helped start the new Stavanger wave that came after Mongoland premiered, and several of the actors who were instrumental have since enjoyed great success.

Stavanger native Stian Kristiansen, who had his acting breakthrough in the feature film "Mongoland", debuted as a feature film director with the film interpretation of Tore Renberg's book The Man Who Loved Yngve. The film, of the same title, had its theatrical release on 15 February 2008. The film has received top marks in Norwegian media, and was watched by over 30,000 people during the premiere weekend. In 2008, Kristiansen received Stavanger's screenplay scholarship.

On 30 September 2010, the film Nokas, directed by Erik Skjoldbjærg, premiered in Stavanger. The film is about the NOKAS robbery in Stavanger on 5 April 2004, and was filmed on location, using many of the locations where the factual event took place, such as the King Street counting center, in the Norway Bank building, and the Cathedral Square, by Maria Church Ruins. The family of the police officer who died during the robbery has not authorized the film.

=== TV ===
Lykkeland (State of Happiness), a Norwegian drama series of so far 24 episodes in three seasons, premiered with the first season on NRK1 in 2018. The series is about the time when Norway enters the oil age and follows some families and people in Stavanger who experience great upheavals when the city goes from being a pietistic community with fishing, shipping and agriculture as main industries, to becoming an international, rich oil city. The second season premiered on 2 January 2022 and deals with dramatic events in the 1970s and 1980s.

The series won two awards during the newly started CannesSeries Festival in Cannes in 2018. The first season of the series won five awards during the Gullruten ("Golden Screen", Norway) 2019 – best drama series, best actress for Anne Regine Ellingsæter, best director TV drama for Petter Næss and Pål Jackman, best screenplay in TV drama for Mette Marit Bølstad and best costume for Karen Fabritius Gram. During the Gullruten 2022, the second season of the series won five awards, among them best supporting role for Pia Tjelta and best director TV drama for Petter Næss.

=== European Capital of Culture 2008 ===
Stavanger and its region, along with Liverpool, United Kingdom, was selected as a European Capital of Culture for 2008. The Stavanger2008 vision is expressed through the concept "Open Port". This can be understood both in its English sense – "an open harbour" – and in its Norwegian meaning of "an open gate", together implying openness towards the world. The region and its people is supposed to be even more open and inclusive towards art, ideas and opportunities.

Stavanger was the host port of the Cutty Sark Tall Ships' Race in 1997 and 2004.

=== Sport and recreation ===
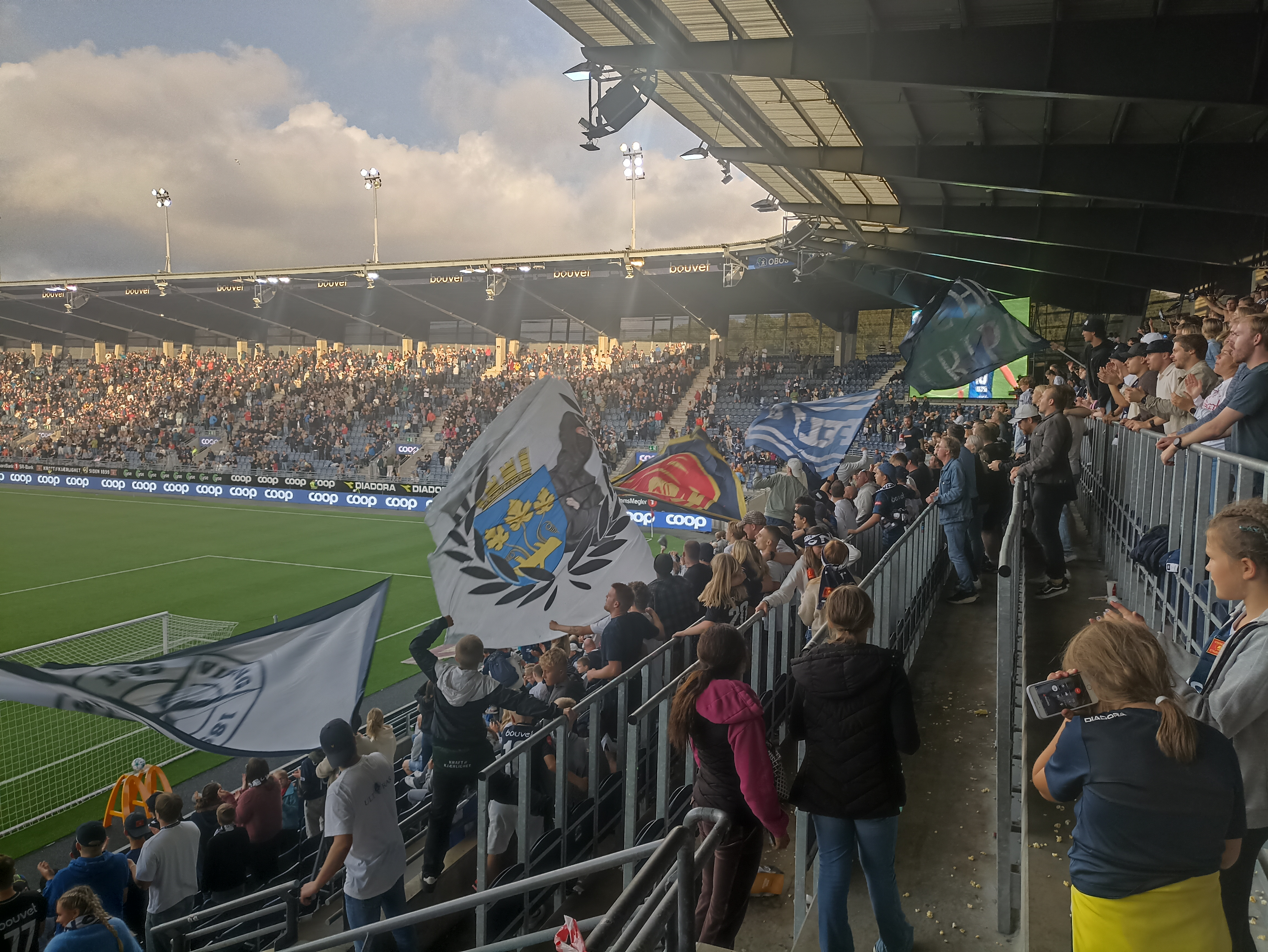
Viking Stadion in 2023

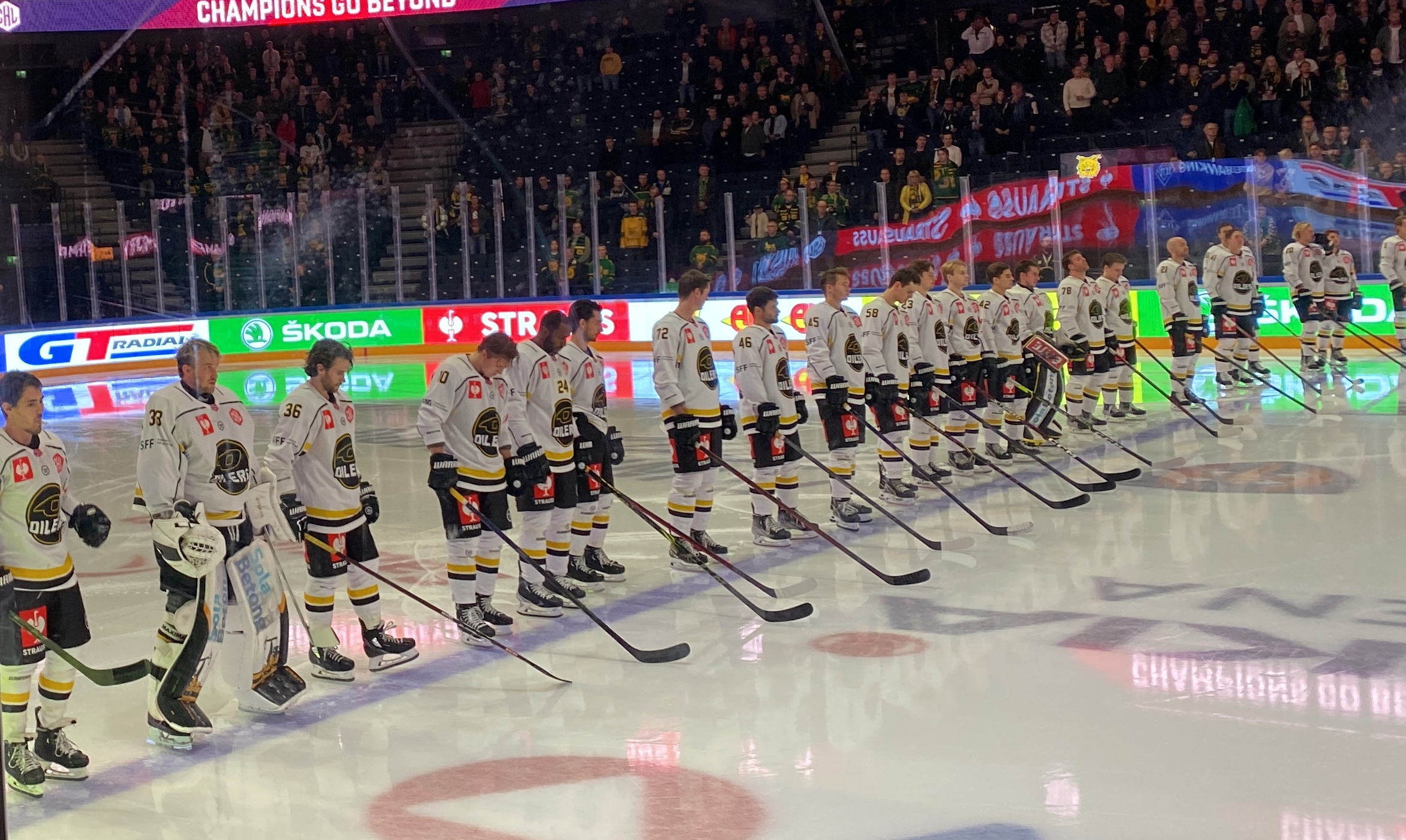
Stavanger Oilers has won seven Norwegian championship titles

The largest local football club in Stavanger is Viking FK, one of the most successful football clubs in Norwegian history, having won a total of nine league titles and five Norwegian Football Cup titles. The club plays its home matches at Lyse Arena, which was opened in 2004.

After a short stint in the second-tier division, OBOS-ligaen, in the 2018 season, Viking FK was once again promoted to the top-tier Eliteserien, and is to date the club with the most seasons at the highest level of Norwegian football, along with Trondheim rival Rosenborg BK. Their best performance in Europe is reaching the group stage of the 2005–06 UEFA Cup, where they placed 4th in a group of 5.

FK Vidar, another local football club, plays in 3. divisjon as of April 2025, the fourth tier on the men's football league pyramid.

Stavanger Oilers is the only western team in the top Norwegian ice hockey league, Fjordkraftligaen. It has won a total of seven Norwegian championship titles. The club plays its home matches at DNB Arena, which was opened in 2012. They have once progressed past the group stage in Champions Hockey League, which was in the 2015–16 season.

The handball team Stavanger Håndball plays in the Norwegian second division.

Stavanger was the host of the 2009 beach volleyball SWATCH FIVB World Championships.

The Sørmarka Arena is an indoor multi-purpose ice rink used for (inter)national ice speed skating competitions.

Stavanger is known to have been one of several available starting points in the 1931, 1935, and 1937 editions of the Monte Carlo Rally. In the 1937 edition the top 3 all started from Stavanger.

Club	Sport	Founded	League	Venue	Head coach(es)
Viking FK	Football	1899	Eliteserien	SR-Bank Arena	Bjarte Lunde Aarsheim; Morten Jensen
Stavanger Oilers	Ice hockey	2000	Fjordkraftligaen	DNB Arena	Todd Bjorkstrand

=== Music ===
Every May, Stavanger is host to MaiJazz, the Stavanger International Jazz Festival. The International Chamber Music Festival takes place every August.

Stavanger is the home of the Stavanger Symphony Orchestra (SSO). Covering another part of the musical spectrum, it is also home to gothic metal bands Theatre of Tragedy, Tristania, Sirenia and the singer Liv Kristine, and the black metal band Gehenna. Janove Ottesen and Geir Zahl, founding members of the alternative rockband Kaizers Orchestra, both live in Stavanger as well. Other notable acts from Stavanger include Kvelertak, Thomas Dybdahl and Sturle Dagsland. The singer, songwriter and record producer Aurora was born in this city.

=== Community art ===
Annually, in September, Stavanger participates in the NuArt Festival, held to showcase non-traditional artists and performers from Norway and abroad. The festival has been described as "one of Europe's most dynamic and constantly evolving public art events."

== Tourism ==
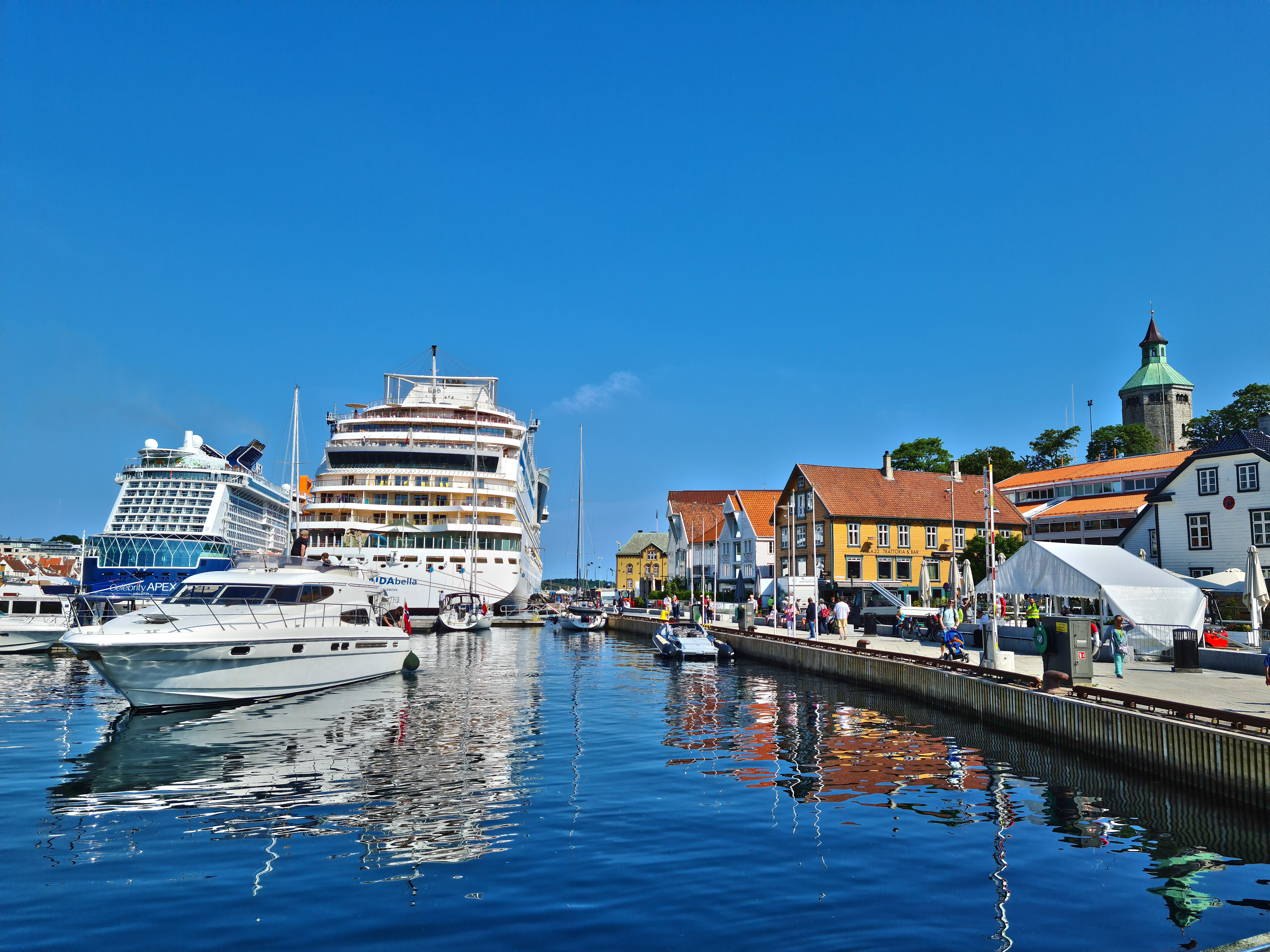
Cruise ships in Stavanger 2022

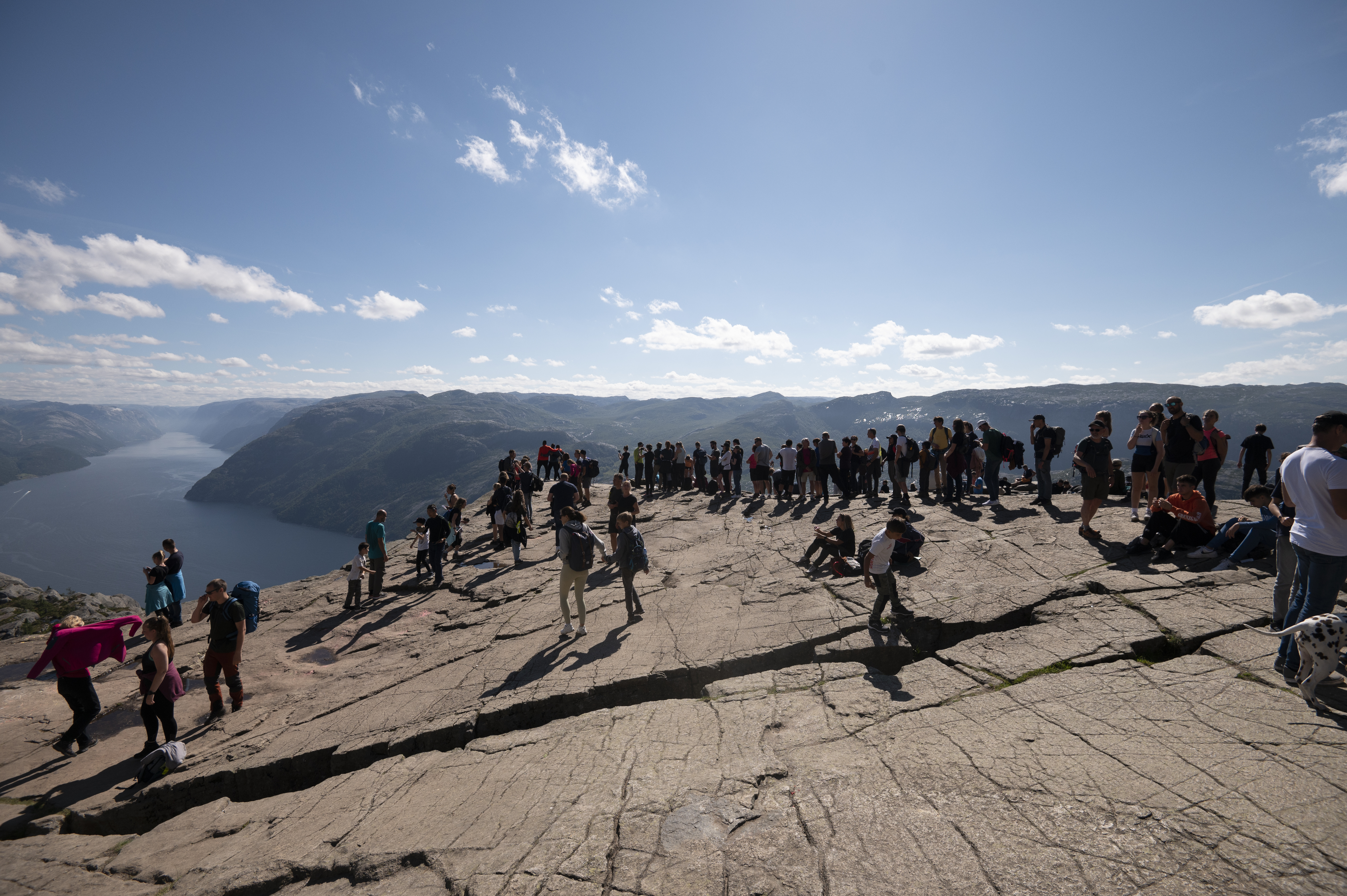
Preikestolen in 2022

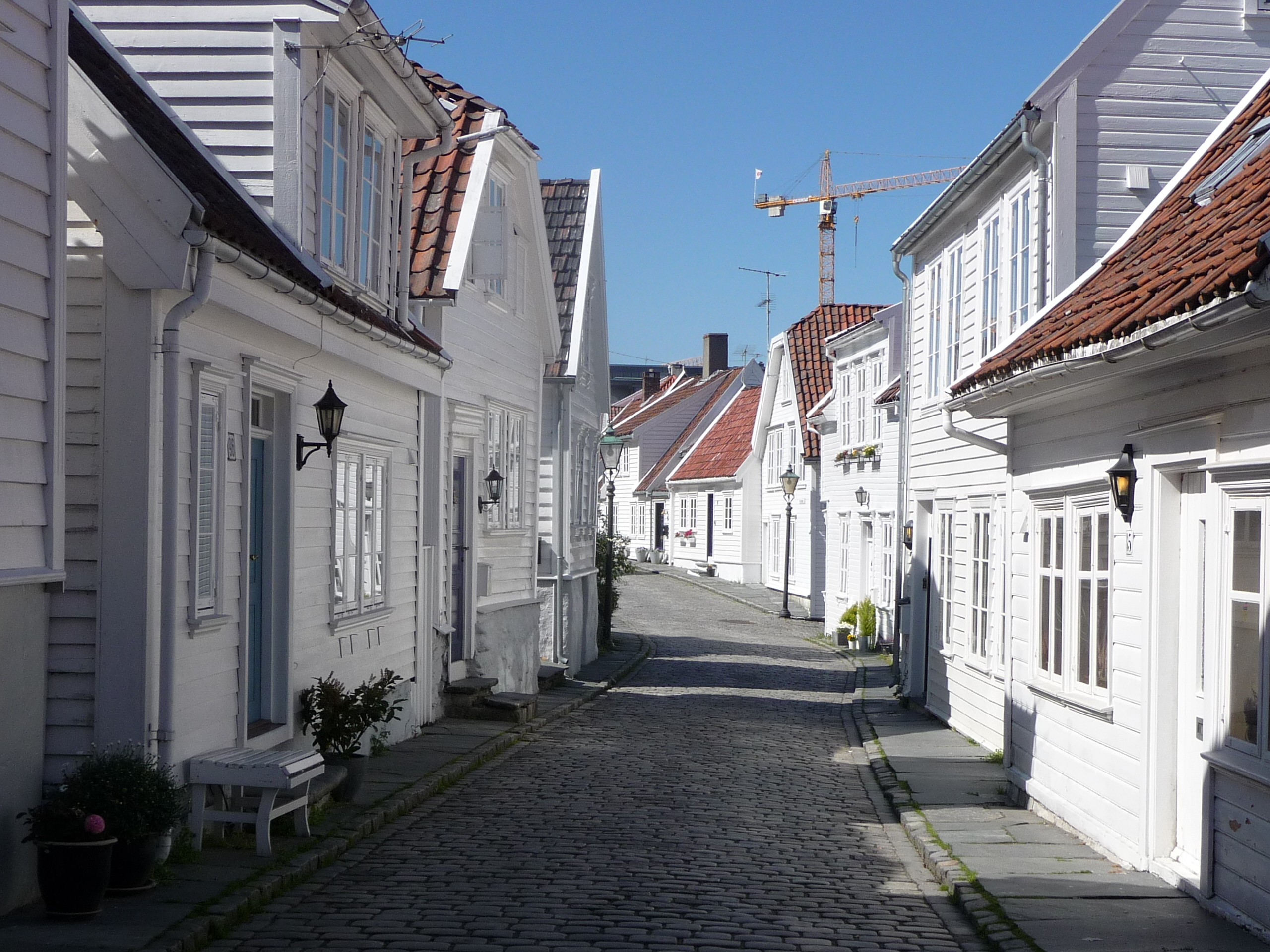
Gamle Stavanger in 2010

Stavanger is a popular tourist destination, especially in summer. The hotels in the city enjoy high levels of occupancy all year round, due to the large number of commuters travelling to Stavanger, both for work and in order to attend meetings. In recent years, Stavanger has also become one of the most popular ports of call for cruise ships, with the number of cruise ships increasing steadily, making Stavanger one of Europe's fastest growing ports of call for cruise ships north of the Mediterranean.

Especially in the summertime, Stavanger's harbour is full of large cruiseships: in 2011 Stavanger hosted 130 cruiseships. The Port of Stavanger is a popular stop on the route to the Norwegian Fjords. The city center is just a small walk from the quay.

=== Outdoor activities ===
There are not many outdoor activities in Stavanger itself, however, splendid opportunities are nearby in adjacent municipalities: Lysefjorden is particularly popular for hiking. Tourists typically visit places like Preikestolen (aka the Pulpit Rock), and Kjeragbolten. Preikestolen is a massive rock overhanging the fjord (604 metres below). Kjeragbolten is a rock wedged in the cliff approximately 1,000 metres above the fjord. The straight fall 1,000 metres down to the fjord makes Kjerag a very popular location for BASE jumping.

Not too far from Stavanger, alpine centers are available for skiers and snowboarders throughout the winter season.

Along the coast south of Stavanger there are a number of large, sandy beaches, including at Sola, within close reach from the city.

=== City center ===
Old Stavanger (Gamle Stavanger) is located right next to the city center and has a collection of 18th- and 19th-century wooden structures.

Stavanger domkirke (St. Swithun's cathedral) was built between 1100 and 1150 by the English bishop Reinald in Anglo-Norman style, and in the late 13th century a new choir was added in Gothic style, with a vaulted roof. The cathedral is the only Norwegian cathedral that is almost unchanged since the 14th century.

The city center itself is small and intimate, with narrow streets and open spaces protected from car traffic.

== Notable people ==
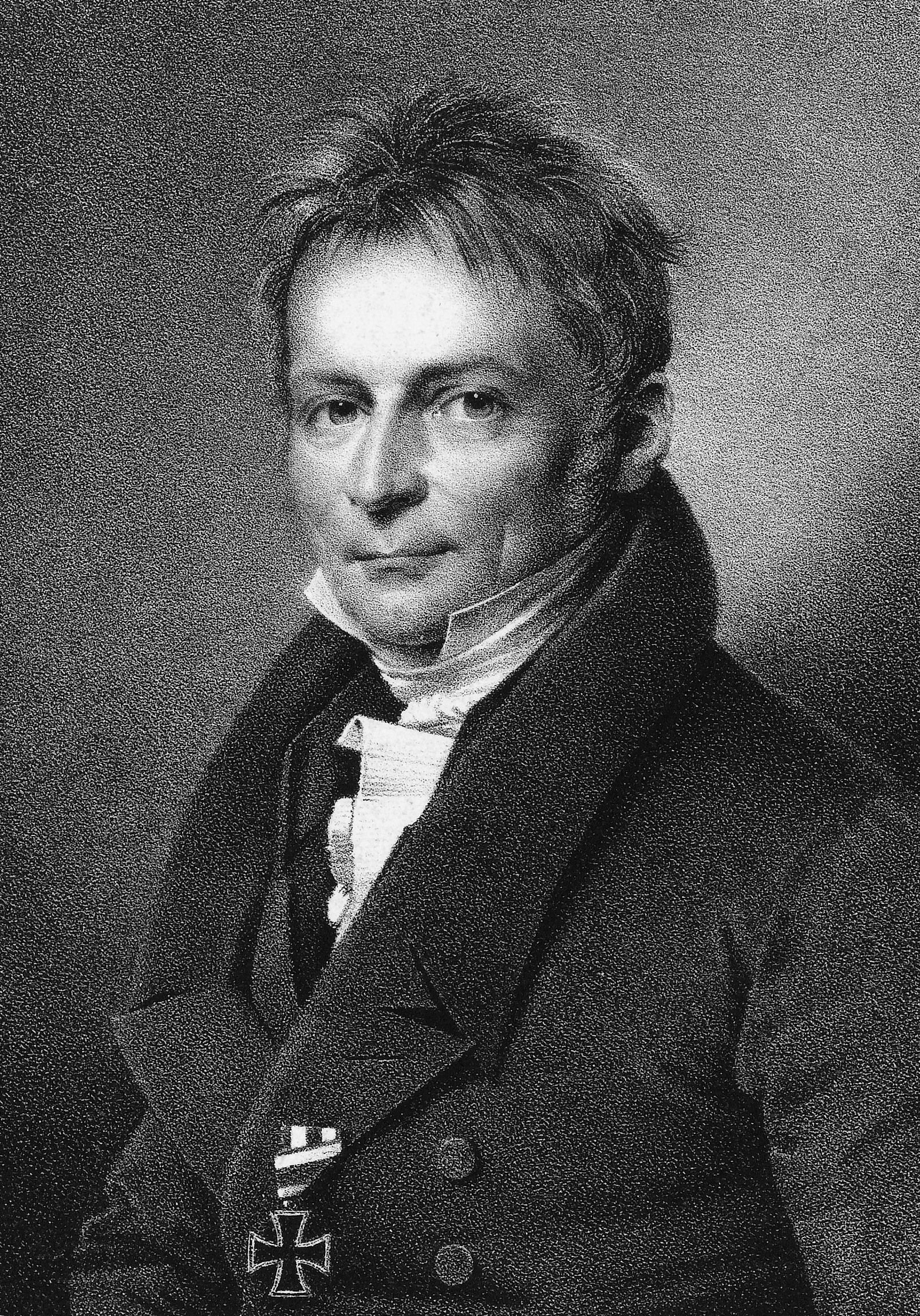
Henrich Steffens, 1828

=== Public service & business ===
- Just Henrik Ely (1759–1824), military officer, rep. at Norwegian Constitutional Assembly
- Gabriel Schanche Kielland (1760–1821), businessman and ship owner
- Peder Valentin Rosenkilde (1772–1836), merchant and rep. at Norwegian Constituent Assembly
- Henrik Steffens (1773–1845), Norwegian philosopher, scientist, and poet
- Lars Oftedal (1838–1900), priest, social reformer, politician; founded Stavanger Aftenblad
- Christian Lous Lange (1869–1938), historian & political scientist; exponent of internationalism
- Jacob Christian Petersen (1870–1964), priest, first modern-day Bishop of Stavanger in 1925–1940
- Nicolai Rygg (1872–1957), economist and Governor of the Central Bank of Norway
- Olaf Gjerløw (1885–1949), newspaper editor, edited Morgenbladet in 1920–1949
- Thore Horve (1899–1990, naval officer, ran the Royal Norwegian Navy in 1946–1949
- Håkon Nilsen (1913–1976), highly decorated war veteran of World War II, torpedo commander HNorMs Stord
- Ingerid Gjøstein Resi (1901–1955), philologist, women's rights leader and politician
- Sven Oftedal (1905–1948), physician, politician and Govt. minister
- Guri Hjeltnes (born 1953), journalist, historian and academic
- Anne Lise Ådnøy (born 1957), prelate, Bishop of Stavanger since 2019
- Leif Johan Sevland (born 1961), politician, Mayor of Stavanger from 1995 to 2011
- Aslak Sira Myhre (born 1973), journalist, director of the National Library of Norway since 2014
- Afua Hirsch (born 1981), British journalist, broadcaster and former barrister

=== The Arts ===
- Alexander Kielland (1849–1906), realistic writer, one of "The Four Greats"
- Peder Severin Krøyer (1851–1909), one of the Skagen Painters
- Frida Hansen (1855–1931), textile artist
- Olaf Lange (1875–1965), painter
- Henny Skjønberg (1886–1973), actress and stage director
- Fartein Valen (1887–1952), composer
- Henrik Grevenor (1896–1937), art historian and academic
- Liv Bredal (1919–2011), film actress
- Gunnar Eide (1920–2012), actor and theatre director
- Gunnar Bull Gundersen (1929–1993), sailor, novelist, playwright and lyricist
- Knut Husebø (born 1946), actor and visual artist
- Frode Gjerstad (born 1948), jazz musician, plays alto saxophone
- Ståle Kleiberg (born 1958), contemporary classical composer and musicologist
- Mia Gundersen (born 1961), singer and actress
- Sigvart Dagsland (born 1963), singer, pianist, and composer
- Sveinung Bjelland (born 1970), classical pianist, soloist and Lieder accompanist
- Hans-Peter Lindstrøm (born 1973), multi-instrumentalist, DJ, and producer
- John Erik Kaada (born 1975), singer-songwriter, film score composer, multi-instrumentalist
- Liv Kristine Espenæs (born 1976) and Carmen Elise Espenæs, metal singer-songwriters
- Pia Tjelta (born 1977), Norwegian actress
- Johan Harstad (born 1979), novelist, short story writer, playwright and graphic designer
- Pål Sverre Hagen (born 1980), Norwegian stage and screen actor
- Ingrid Dahle (born c. 1990), comedian and actress
- Aurora (born 1996), singer, songwriter and record producer
- Rafael Rosell (born 1982), actor

=== Sport ===
- Kjell Schou-Andreassen (1940–1997), football manager
- Svein Kvia (1947–2005), footballer
- Erik Thorstvedt (born 1962), footballer
- Asle Andersen (born 1972), football manager and player
- Gunn-Rita Dahle Flesjå (born 1973), cross-country mountain biker
- Cecilie Drabsch Norland (born 1978), Paralympic swimmer
- Linda Grubben (born 1979), biathlete
- Ane Stangeland Horpestad (born 1980), footballer
- Ole Erevik (born 1981), handball player
- Brede Hangeland (born 1981), footballer
- Kjetil Jansrud (born 1985), alpine ski racer and Olympic champion
- Alexander Kristoff (born 1987), cyclist
- Sarah Louise Rung (born 1989), Paralympic swimmer
- Elisabeth Terland (born 2001), football player for the Norway national team
- Pål Varhaug (born 1991), racing driver
- Aryan Tari (born 1999), chess grandmaster
- Alf-Inge Haaland (born 1972), footballer

== Twin towns – sister cities ==
Stavanger is twinned with:

- (United Kingdom) Aberdeen, UK
- Antsirabe, Madagascar
- Esbjerg, Denmark
- Eskilstuna, Sweden
- Estelí, Nicaragua
- Neskaupstaður, Iceland
- Galveston, United States
- Houston, United States
- Jyväskylä, Finland
- Nablus, Palestine
- Netanya, Israel

== See also ==
- Greater Stavanger Region
- Czechoslovakia (band)
