= Hetland Municipality =

Former municipality in Rogaland, Norway

Hetland Municipality Hetland kommune
- Former municipality
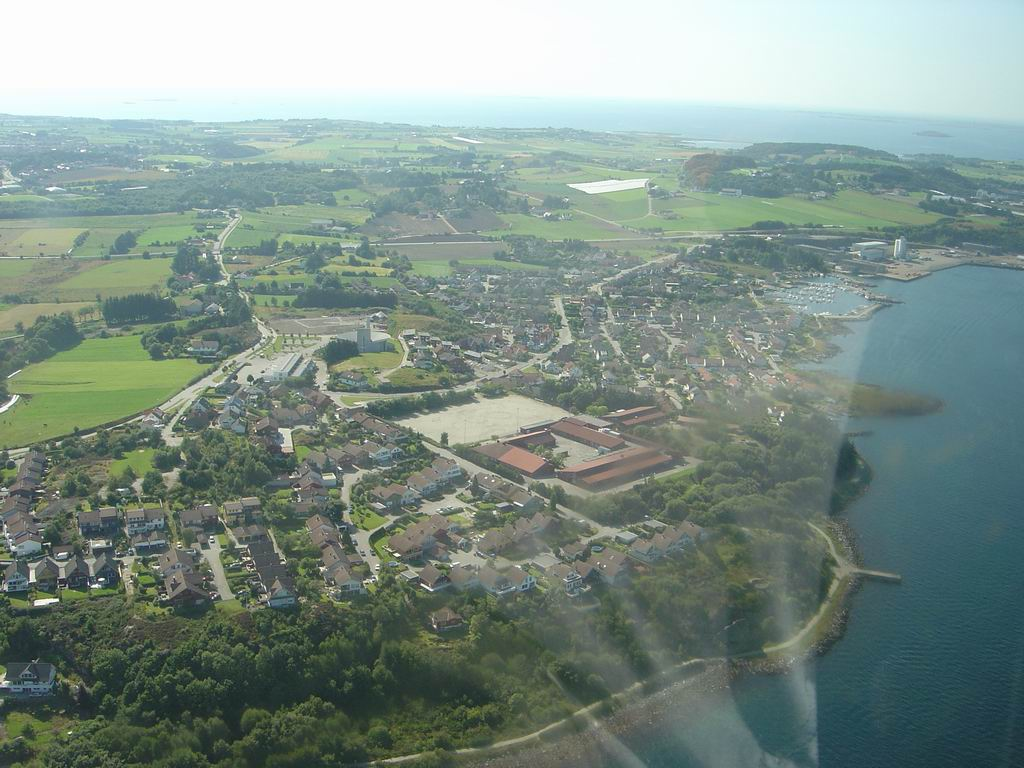
- View of Grødem village

- Rogaland within Norway

- Hetland within Rogaland
- Coordinates: 58°53′32″N 05°44′01″E
- Country: Norway
- County: Rogaland
- District: Jæren
- Established: 1 Jan 1838
  - Created as: Formannskapsdistrikt
- Disestablished: 1 Jan 1965
  - Succeeded by: Sandnes Municipality and Stavanger Municipality
- Administrative centre: Stavanger

Government
  - Mayor (1960–1965): Per Barkved (V)

Area (upon dissolution)
  - Total: 92.5 km^{2} (35.7 sq mi)
  - Rank: #426 in Norway
- Highest elevation: 139 m (456 ft)

Population (1964)
  - Total: 22,474
  - Rank: #20 in Norway
  - Density: 243/km^{2} (630/sq mi)
  - Change (10 years): ▲ +36.9%
- Demonym: Hetlandsbu

Official language
  - Norwegian form: Nynorsk
- Time zone: UTC+01:00 (CET)
  - Summer (DST): UTC+02:00 (CEST)
- ISO 3166 code: NO-1126

Hetland is a former municipality in Rogaland county, Norway. The 92.5-square-kilometre (35.7 sq mi) municipality existed from 1838 until its dissolution in 1965. The area is now divided between Stavanger Municipality and Sandnes Municipality in the traditional district of Jæren. The administrative centre was located in the city of Stavanger (so the administration was actually located in a different municipality).

Prior to its dissolution in 1965, the 92.5-square-kilometre (35.7 sq mi) municipality was the 426th largest by area out of the 525 municipalities in Norway. Hetland Municipality was the 243rd most populous municipality in Norway with a population of about 22,474. The municipality's population density was 243 inhabitants per square kilometre (630/sq mi) and its population had increased by 36.9% over the previous 10-year period.

== General information ==
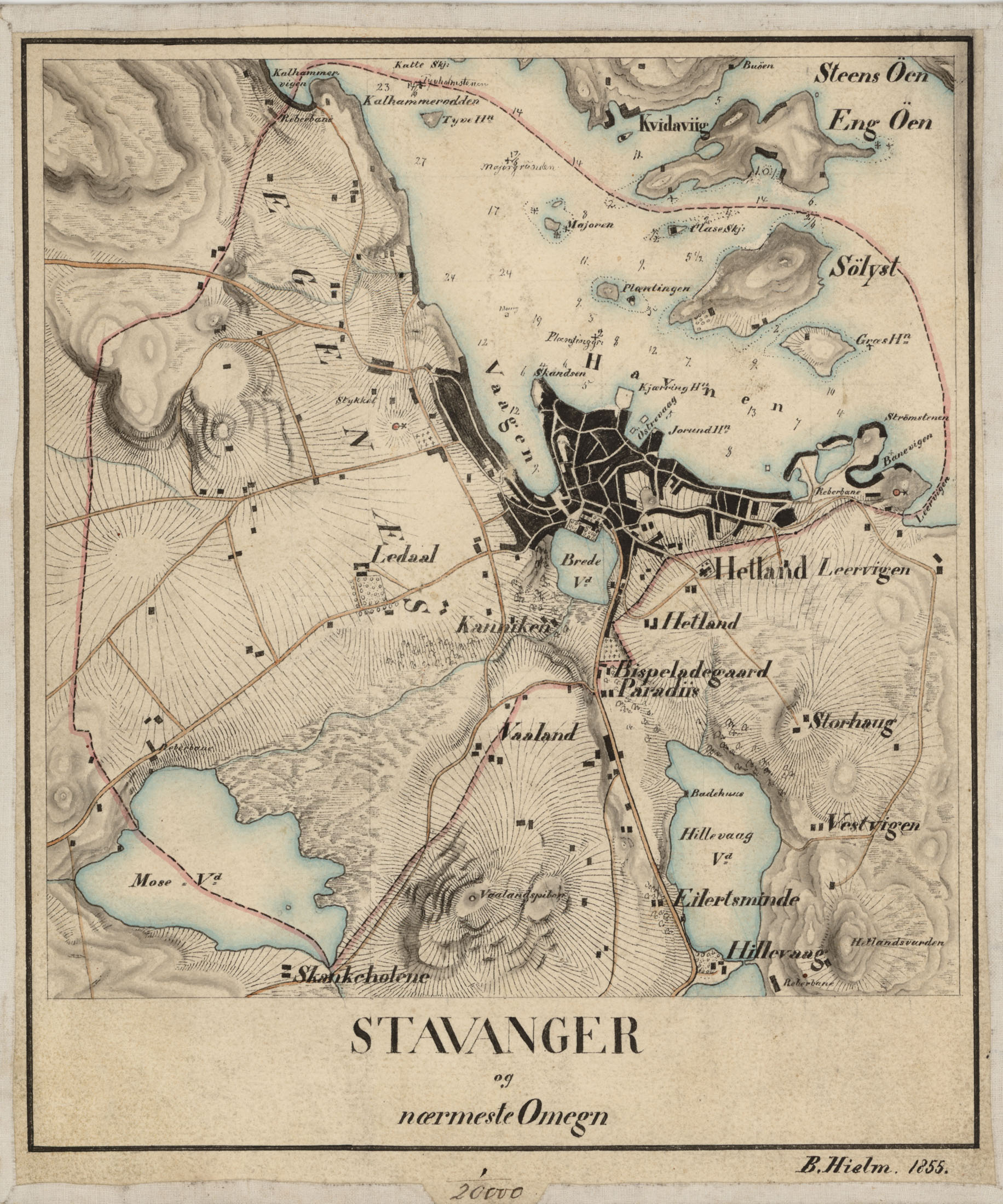
1855 map of the city of Stavanger. Hetland Municipality surrounds the city, with Hetland Church located just outside the city.

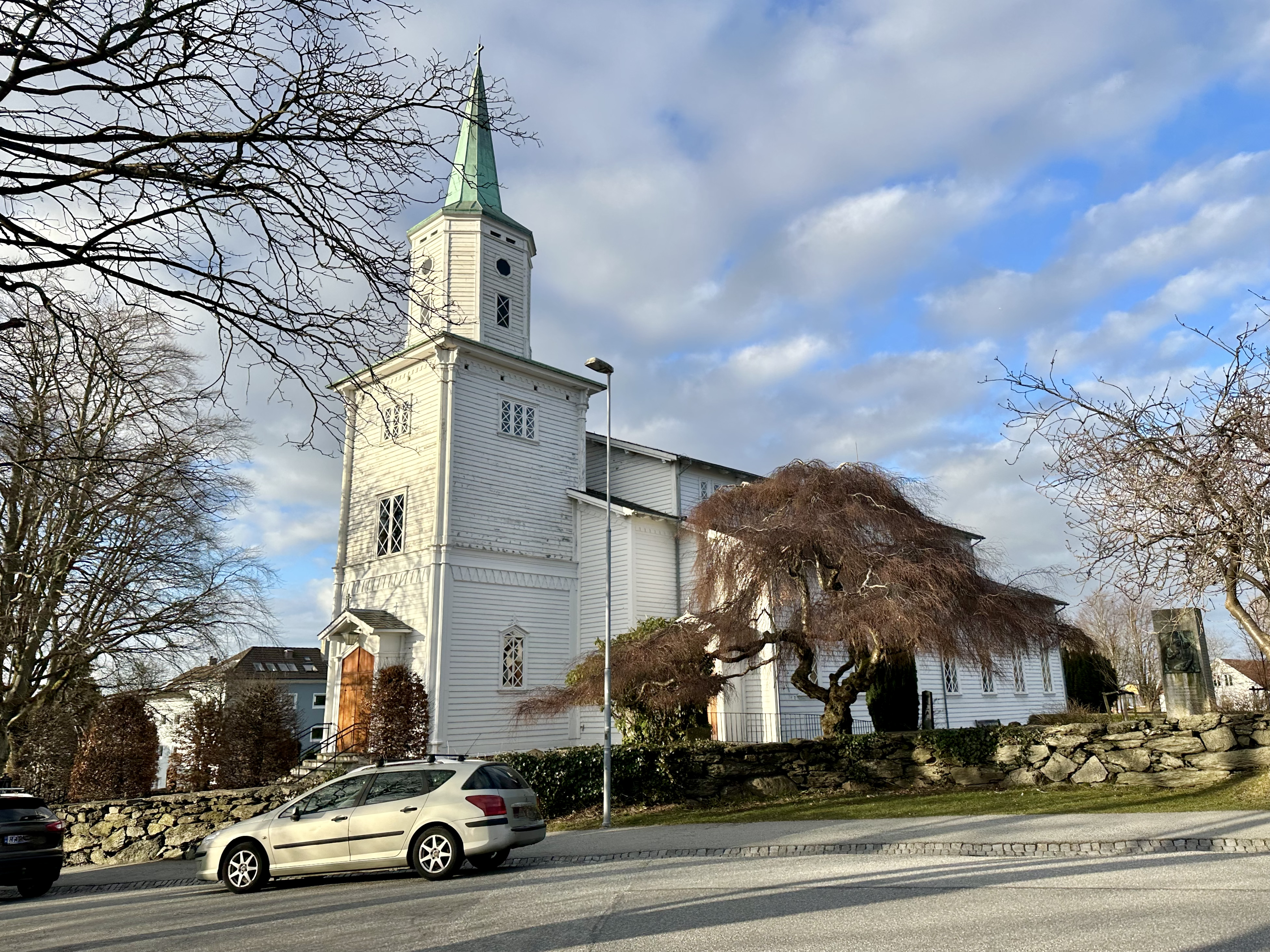
View of Hetland Church

The parish of Hetland was established as a municipality on 1 January 1838 (see formannskapsdistrikt law). On 1 July 1922, the northwestern district of the municipality (population: 1,256) was separated to form the new Randaberg Municipality. This split left Hetland Municipality with 10,167 residents. The port city of Stavanger was located along the Gandsfjorden, adjacent to Hetland Municipality and as the city expanded over the years, areas of Hetland Municipality were annexed to join the city. Such changes happened in 1867, 1879, 1906, 1923, and 1953. Also on 1 January 1912, a small area in Høyland Municipality (population: 41) was transferred to Hetland.

During the 1960s, there were many municipal mergers across Norway due to the work of the Schei Committee. On 1 January 1965, Hetland Municipality was dissolved and its lands were divided between Sandnes Municipality (lands east of the Gandsfjord) and Stavanger Municipality (lands west of the Gandsfjord).

The following areas were merged to form a larger Sandnes Municipality:

- all of Høyland Municipality (population: 20,353)
- all of the city of Sandnes (population: 3,961)
- the Riska and Dale areas of Hetland Municipality (population: 2,077)
- most of Høle Municipality (population: 926), except for the Oltevik area which became part of Gjesdal Municipality

The following areas were merged to form a larger Stavanger Municipality:

- most of Hetland Municipality (population: 20,861), except for the Riska and Dale areas which became part of Sandnes Municipality
- all of Madla Municipality (population: 6,025)
- all of the city of Stavanger (population: 51,470)

=== Name ===
The municipality (originally the parish) is named after the old Hetland farm (Old Norse: Hesliland) since the first Hetland Church was built there. The first element is hesli which means "hazel tree". The last element is land which means "land" or "district".

=== Churches ===
The Church of Norway had one parish (sokn) within Hetland Municipality. At the time of the municipal dissolution, it was part of the Hetland prestegjeld and the Hetland prosti (deanery) in the Diocese of Stavanger.

Churches in Hetland Municipality
Parish (sokn)	Church name	Location of the church	Year built
Hetland	Frue Church	Hetland	1854
Hetland	Austre Åmøy Chapel	Austre Åmøy	1904
Riska	Riska Church	Hommersåk	1877

== Geography ==
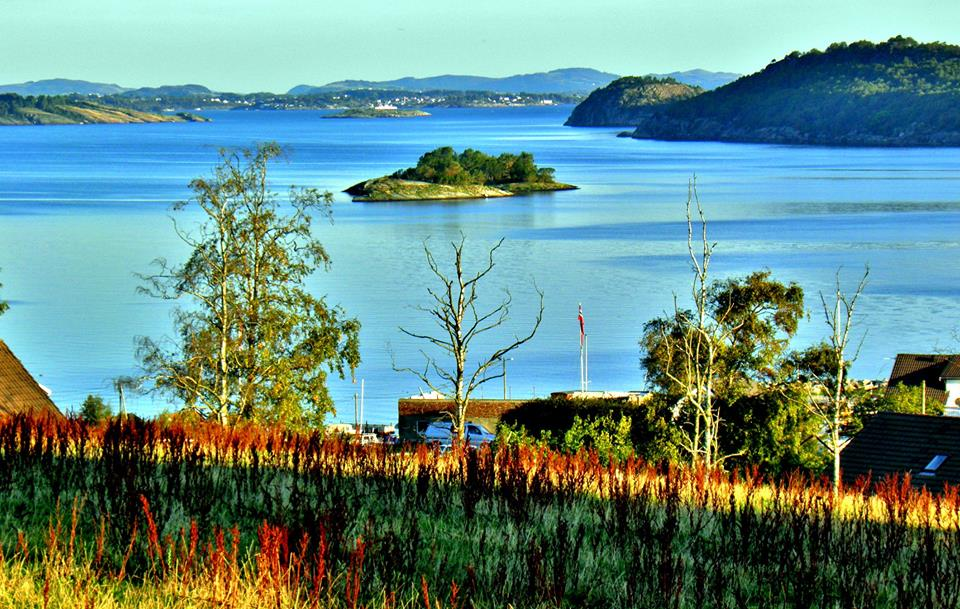
View from Hommersåk towards Stavanger

The municipality included land on the Stavanger Peninsula and the land surrounding both sides of the Gandsfjord, but not the area around the head of the fjord. The highest point in the municipality was the 139-metre (456 ft) tall mountain Ullandhaug, located on the border with Stavanger Municipality, just south of the lake Mosvatnet. Hetland Municipality included many islands in the Gandsfjord including Hundvåg, Langøy, Vassøy, Roaldsøy, Lindøy, Hellesøy, Kalvøy, Uskjo, and the eastern half of Åmøy.

Rennesøy Municipality was located to the north, Strand Municipality was located to the northeast, Høle Municipality was located to the east, Høyland Municipality was located to the south, Sola Municipality was located to the southwest, Madla Municipality was located to the west, and both Randaberg Municipality and Mosterøy Municipality were located to the northwest. The city of Stavanger was located within Hetland Municipality as an enclave, completely surrounded by Hetland.

== Government ==
While it existed, Hetland Municipality was responsible for primary education (through 10th grade), outpatient health services, senior citizen services, welfare and other social services, zoning, economic development, and municipal roads and utilities. The municipality was governed by a municipal council of directly elected representatives. The mayor was indirectly elected by a vote of the municipal council. The municipality was under the jurisdiction of the Hafrsfjord District Court and the Gulating Court of Appeal.

=== Municipal council ===
The municipal council (Heradsstyre) of Hetland Municipality was made up of 41 representatives that were elected to four year terms. The tables below show the historical composition of the council by political party.

Hetland heradsstyre 1963–1965
Party name (in Nynorsk)	Number of representatives
Labour Party (Arbeidarpartiet)	17
Conservative Party (Høgre)	10
Christian Democratic Party (Kristeleg Folkeparti)	4
Centre Party (Senterpartiet)	2
Liberal Party (Venstre)	8
Total number of members:	41
Note: On 1 January 1965, Hetland Municipality was divided between Sandnes Municipality and Stavanger Municipality.

Hetland heradsstyre 1959–1963
Party name (in Nynorsk)	Number of representatives
Labour Party (Arbeidarpartiet)	16
Conservative Party (Høgre)	8
Christian Democratic Party (Kristeleg Folkeparti)	5
Centre Party (Senterpartiet)	2
Liberal Party (Venstre)	10
Total number of members:	41

Hetland heradsstyre 1955–1959
Party name (in Nynorsk)	Number of representatives
Labour Party (Arbeidarpartiet)	16
Conservative Party (Høgre)	6
Christian Democratic Party (Kristeleg Folkeparti)	4
Farmers' Party (Bondepartiet)	2
Liberal Party (Venstre)	10
Joint List(s) of Non-Socialist Parties (Borgarlege Felleslister)	3
Total number of members:	41

Hetland heradsstyre 1951–1955
Party name (in Nynorsk)	Number of representatives
Labour Party (Arbeidarpartiet)	15
Conservative Party (Høgre)	5
Christian Democratic Party (Kristeleg Folkeparti)	4
Farmers' Party (Bondepartiet)	2
Liberal Party (Venstre)	11
Joint List(s) of Non-Socialist Parties (Borgarlege Felleslister)	2
Local List(s) (Lokale lister)	1
Total number of members:	40

Hetland heradsstyre 1947–1951
Party name (in Nynorsk)	Number of representatives
Labour Party (Arbeidarpartiet)	8
Conservative Party (Høgre)	4
Communist Party (Kommunistiske Parti)	2
Christian Democratic Party (Kristeleg Folkeparti)	2
Farmers' Party (Bondepartiet)	2
Liberal Party (Venstre)	9
List of workers, fishermen, and small farmholders (Arbeidarar, fiskarar, småbrukarar liste)	1
Joint List(s) of Non-Socialist Parties (Borgarlege Felleslister)	4
Total number of members:	32

Hetland heradsstyre 1945–1947
Party name (in Nynorsk)	Number of representatives
Labour Party (Arbeidarpartiet)	10
Conservative Party (Høgre)	3
Communist Party (Kommunistiske Parti)	2
Christian Democratic Party (Kristeleg Folkeparti)	2
Farmers' Party (Bondepartiet)	2
Liberal Party (Venstre)	7
List of workers, fishermen, and small farmholders (Arbeidarar, fiskarar, småbrukarar liste)	3
Local List(s) (Lokale lister)	3
Total number of members:	32

Hetland heradsstyre 1937–1941*
Party name (in Nynorsk)	Number of representatives
Labour Party (Arbeidarpartiet)	9
Conservative Party (Høgre)	4
Farmers' Party (Bondepartiet)	3
Liberal Party (Venstre)	10
Joint List(s) of Non-Socialist Parties (Borgarlege Felleslister)	3
Local List(s) (Lokale lister)	3
Total number of members:	32
Note: Due to the German occupation of Norway during World War II, no elections were held for new municipal councils until after the war ended in 1945.

=== Mayors ===
The mayor (Nynorsk: ordførar) of Hetland Municipality was the political leader of the municipality and the chairperson of the municipal council. The following people have held this position:

- 1838–1841: Ommund Larsen Stokke
- 1841–1841: Samuel Samuelsen Ledaal
- 1842–1845: Halvor Sondresen
- 1843–1843: Sven Knutsen Bø
- 1846–1849: Jakob Christian Lindemann Bull
- 1850–1857: Asser Enoksen Jaatten
- 1858–1858: Niels Enoksen Qvaleberg
- 1858–1860: Wilhelm Ravn Sundt
- 1861–1861: Johan E. Nymann
- 1862–1863: Halvor Børgesen Scheie
- 1864–1867: Olaus Olsen Eskeland (V)
- 1868–1869: Gullik Furta Gitlesen
- 1870–1890: Olaus Olsen Eskeland (V)
- 1890–1891: Erik A. Gilje
- 1892–1893: Thore Olsen Wølstad
- 1894–1903: Olaus Olsen Eskeland (V)
- 1903–1904: Arne Berge
- 1905–1912: Thore Olsen Wølstad
- 1912–1913: Osmund Rossavik
- 1914–1916: Karl L. Helliesen
- 1917–1922: Christian Eriksen Gilje
- 1923–1925: Henrik O. Tjensvold
- 1926–1941: Olav Tveterås (V)
- 1941–1945: Peter Gustav Adolf Thjømøe (NS)
- 1945–1959: Johan Askeland (V)
- 1960–1965: Per Barkved (V)

== See also ==
- List of former municipalities of Norway
