= Stokkavatnet (Forus) =

Former lake in Stavanger, Norway

Coordinates: 58.8944°N 5.69639°E

Stokkavatnet is a former lake that was located at Forus in Stavanger Municipality, Norway, between the two fjords Hafrsfjord and Gandsfjord. The lake was among the largest at the Northern Jæren district, with an area of about 4 square kilometres (1.5 sq mi). It was surrounded by considerable areas of marsh land, and was known for a rich birdlife. The lake drained to the Gandsfjord, and the outlet supplied six mills located near the fjord.

== Drainage ==
Plans for draining the area initiated in the 1860s, but the plan was not approved until 1905. The drainage started in 1906. Including the surrounding areas, about 4.5 square kilometres (1.7 sq mi) of new land was cultivated. The land redistribution involved eighty individual farms (eight main farms): Skadberg and Røyneberg (in the old Håland Municipality; now part of Sola Municipality), Forus, Gausel, Godeset and Jåttå (in the old Hetland Municipality; now part of Stavanger Municipality), and Stokka and Lura (in the old Høyland Municipality; now part of Sandnes Municipality).

== Later usage ==
During occupation of Norway by Nazi Germany from 1940 the Stavanger Airport, Forus was constructed at the location of the former lake. The construction work was directed by the German occupants, with the help of well paid entrepreneurs and volunteers moving in from other parts of the country. The population of Stavanger increased by an estimate of 35%. This both stimulated the economy, and led to friction between the immigrants (often called "Forus-rotter", or "Forus Rats") and the local population. Gradually the work got characteristics of forced labour, local civilians were forced to work for the occupants, and the work force often treated like prisoners. Later also Russian prisoners-of-war were brought to the district and put into forced construction labour.

From 1972 the land has been utilised for development of industry, by the establishment of "Forus Industritomteselskap". About 1000 companies are located at the site of the former lake, including petroleum companies, entrepreneurs, and production, service and trade companies.
