= Øyane =

Neighborhood of Stavanger, Norway

Coordinates: 58°59′38.026″N 5°45′41.911″E

Øyane is a neighborhood (delområde) in the city of Stavanger which lies in the southwestern part of the large municipality of Stavanger in Rogaland county, Norway. It includes many of the islands located to the east of the mainland portion of the city. The northern part includes the eastern half of the island of Åmøy which is in the borough of Tasta and the islands of Bjørnøy, Roadsøy, Ormøy, and Steinsøy are located in the borough of Hundvåg. The rest of Øyane, which includes the islands of Lindøy, Hellesøy, Kalvøy, Vassøy, and Langøy are all sparsely inhabited and not a part of any city borough. The neighborhood's area is 7.8 square kilometres (1,900 acres) and the population in 2005 was 2,125.
