= Høle Municipality =

Former municipality in Rogaland, Norway

Høle Municipality Høle herred
- Former municipality
- Høgsfjord herred (historic name)
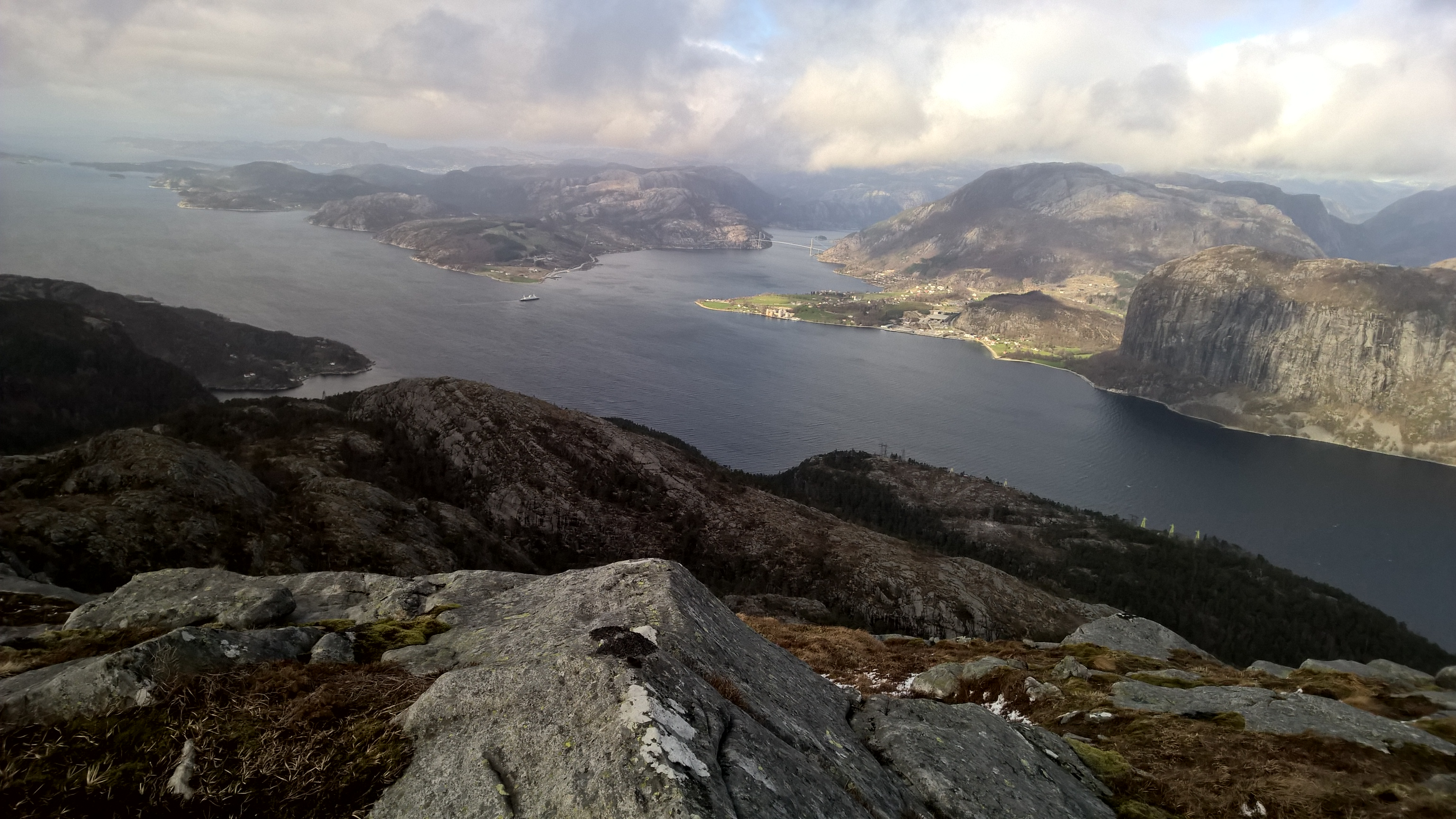
- View of Høle Municipality (foreground) and Forsand Municipality (far side of the fjord)

- Rogaland within Norway

- Høle within Rogaland
- Coordinates: 58°53′44″N 06°00′33″E
- Country: Norway
- County: Rogaland
- District: Ryfylke
- Established: 1 Jan 1842
  - Preceded by: Strand Municipality
- Disestablished: 1 Jan 1965
  - Succeeded by: Sandnes Municipality and Gjesdal Municipality
- Administrative centre: Høle

Government
  - Mayor (1964–1964): Trygve Bergsåker

Area (upon dissolution)
  - Total: 106.10 km^{2} (40.97 sq mi)
  - Rank: #414 in Norway
- Highest elevation: 671 m (2,201 ft)

Population (1964)
  - Total: 968
  - Rank: #487 in Norway
  - Density: 9.1/km^{2} (24/sq mi)
  - Change (10 years): ▼ −6.7%

Official language
  - Norwegian form: Nynorsk
- Time zone: UTC+01:00 (CET)
  - Summer (DST): UTC+02:00 (CEST)
- ISO 3166 code: NO-1128

Høle (or historically Høgsfjord) is a former municipality in Rogaland county, Norway. The 106.1-square-kilometre (41.0 sq mi) municipality existed from 1865 until its dissolution in 1965 (during the period from 1865 until 1871, it was called Høgsfjord Municipality). The area is now divided between Gjesdal Municipality and Sandnes Municipality in the traditional district of Ryfylke. The administrative centre was the village of Høle.

Prior to its dissolution in 1965, the 106.1-square-kilometre (41.0 sq mi) municipality was the 414th largest by area out of the 525 municipalities in Norway. Høle Municipality was the 487th most populous municipality in Norway with a population of about 968. The municipality's population density was 9.1 inhabitants per square kilometre (24/sq mi) and its population had decreased by 6.7% over the previous 10-year period.

The municipality originally was quite large, surrounding both sides of the Høgsfjorden and Lysefjorden. Throughout its history, it included large parts of the present-day Sandnes Municipality and Gjesdal Municipality. Since 1965, most of the area of the old Høle Municipality has made up the borough of Høle within Sandnes Municipality. Høle Church, built in 1860, was the main church of the municipality.

== General information ==
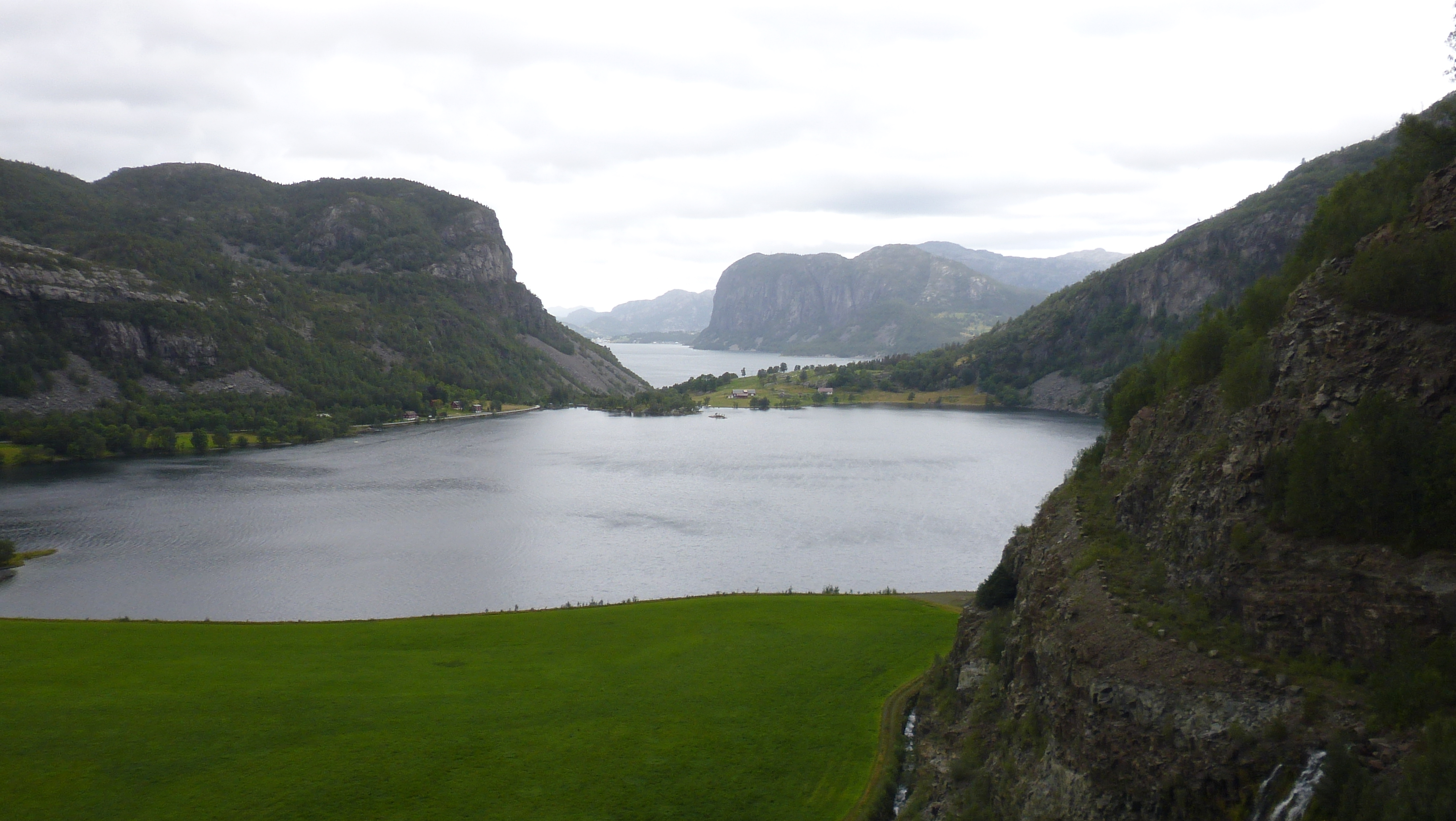
View of the lake Ragsvatnet and the Høgsfjorden further behind

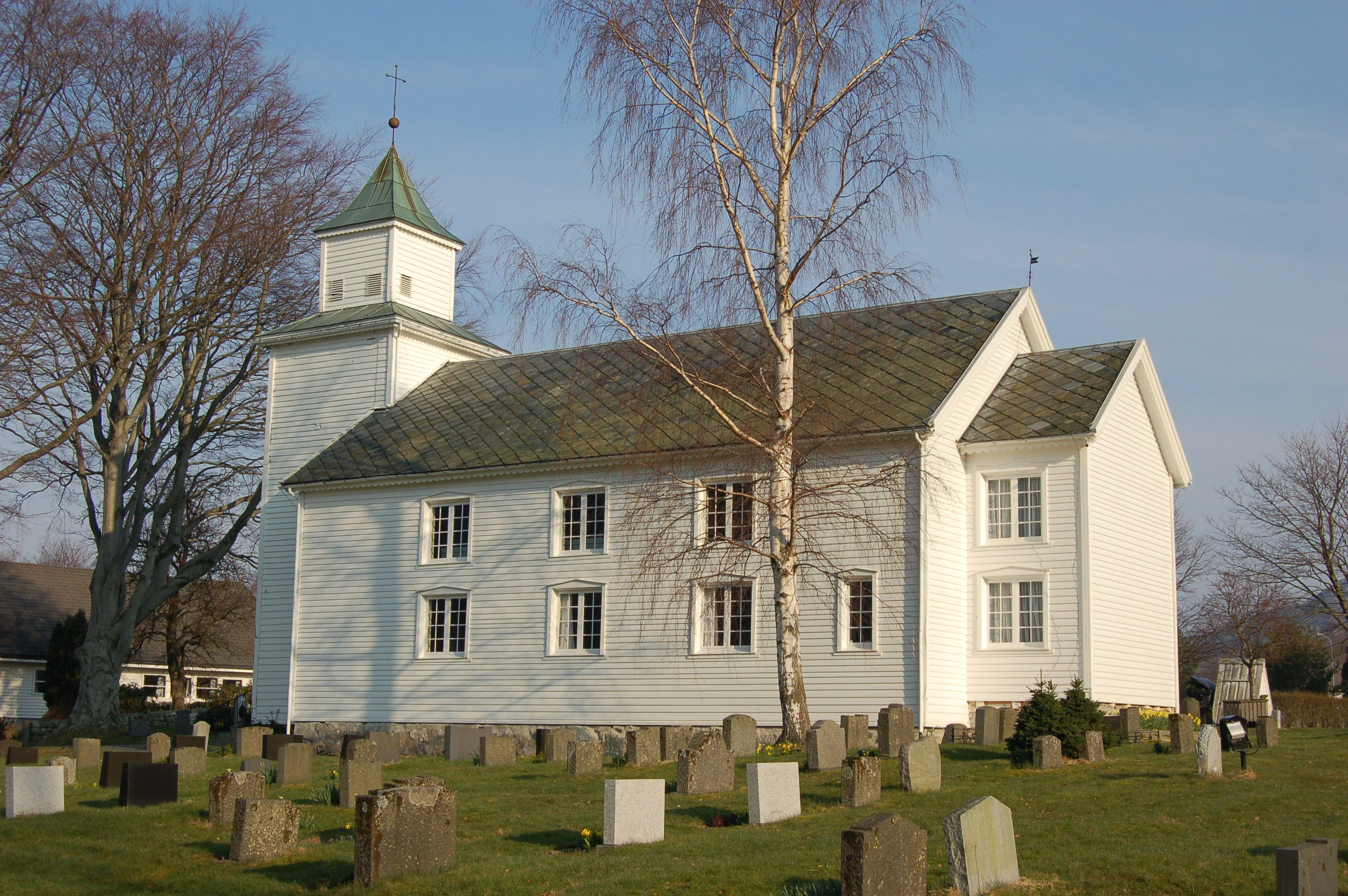
View of Høle Church

The municipality of Høgsfjord (later renamed Høle) was established in 1842 when the large Strand Municipality was divided. The southern district (population: 3,203) became the new Høgsfjord Municipality and the northern district (population: 2,228) remained as a much smaller Strand Municipality.

On 1 January 1871, Høgsfjord Municipality was divided into two municipalities: the district located east of the Høgsfjorden (population: 2,081) became the new Fossan Municipality and the remaining parts of Høgsfjord Municipality that were located west of the Høgsfjorden (population: 1,122) changed its name to Høle Municipality.

During the 1960s, there were many municipal mergers in Norway due to the recommendations of the Schei Committee. On 1 January 1965, the southeastern corner of Høle Municipality which surrounded the farming village of Oltesvik (population: 37) was transferred to the neighboring Gjesdal Municipality. The remaining areas of Høle Municipality were merged with the following areas:

- all of Sandnes Municipality (population: 3,931)
- all of Høyland Municipality (population: 20,353)
- the Riska and Dale areas of Hetland Municipality (population: 2,077)
- most of Høle Municipality (population: 926), except for the area around Oltesvik which went to Gjesdal Municipality

=== Name ===
The municipality (originally the parish) was first named Høgsfjord after the Høgsfjorden. The meaning of the first element is uncertain. The last element comes from the word fjǫrðr which means "fjord". In 1871, the municipal name was changed to Høle after the municipality was divided. This new name comes from the old Høle farm (Old Norse: Hylja) since the first Høle Church was built there. The name comes from the old name for the local river. The name is the plural genitive case of hylr which means "deep place" or "pool in a river".

=== Churches ===
The Church of Norway had one parish (sokn) within Høle Municipality. At the time of the municipal dissolution, it was part of the Høgsfjord prestegjeld and the Hetland prosti (deanery) in the Diocese of Stavanger.

Churches in Høle Municipality
Parish (sokn)	Church name	Location of the church	Year built
Høle	Høle Church	Høle	1860

== Geography ==
Høle Municipality was located along the western shore of the Høgsfjorden and it included the island of Ådnøy. The highest point in the municipality was the 671.4-metre (2,203 ft) tall mountain Bynuten. Strand Municipality was located to the north, Forsand Municipality was located to the east, Gjesdal Municipality was located to the south, Høyland Municipality was located to the southwest, and Hetland Municipality was located to the northwest.

== Government ==
While it existed, Høle Municipality was responsible for primary education (through 10th grade), outpatient health services, senior citizen services, welfare and other social services, zoning, economic development, and municipal roads and utilities. The municipality was governed by a municipal council of directly elected representatives. The mayor was indirectly elected by a vote of the municipal council. The municipality was under the jurisdiction of the Ryfylke District Court and the Gulating Court of Appeal.

=== Municipal council ===
The municipal council (Heradsstyre) of Høle Municipality was made up of 13 representatives that were elected to four year terms. The tables below show the historical composition of the council by political party.

Høle heradsstyre 1963–1965
Party name (in Nynorsk)	Number of representatives
Local List(s) (Lokale lister)	13
Total number of members:	13
Note: On 1 January 1965, Høle Municipality was divided between Gjesdal Municipality and Sandnes Municipality.

Høle heradsstyre 1959–1963
Party name (in Nynorsk)	Number of representatives
Labour Party (Arbeidarpartiet)	1
Centre Party (Senterpartiet)	5
Local List(s) (Lokale lister)	7
Total number of members:	13

Høle heradsstyre 1955–1959
Party name (in Nynorsk)	Number of representatives
Labour Party (Arbeidarpartiet)	2
Farmers' Party (Bondepartiet)	5
Local List(s) (Lokale lister)	6
Total number of members:	13

Høle heradsstyre 1951–1955
Party name (in Nynorsk)	Number of representatives
Labour Party (Arbeidarpartiet)	1
Local List(s) (Lokale lister)	11
Total number of members:	12

Høle heradsstyre 1947–1951
Party name (in Nynorsk)	Number of representatives
Labour Party (Arbeidarpartiet)	2
Joint List(s) of Non-Socialist Parties (Borgarlege Felleslister)	10
Total number of members:	12

Høle heradsstyre 1945–1947
Party name (in Nynorsk)	Number of representatives
Labour Party (Arbeidarpartiet)	3
Local List(s) (Lokale lister)	9
Total number of members:	12

Høle heradsstyre 1937–1941*
Party name (in Nynorsk)	Number of representatives
Labour Party (Arbeidarpartiet)	1
Farmers' Party (Bondepartiet)	6
Liberal Party (Venstre)	5
Total number of members:	12
Note: Due to the German occupation of Norway during World War II, no elections were held for new municipal councils until after the war ended in 1945.

=== Mayors ===
The mayor (Nynorsk: ordførar) of Høle Municipality was the political leader of the municipality and the chairperson of the municipal council. The following people have held this position:

- 1842–1843: Osmund Fossand
- 1844–1845: Torger Meling
- 1846–1857: Osmund Fossand
- 1858–1863: Lars Rønneli
- 1864–1865: Guttorm Tollefsen Bergsagel
- 1866–1866: Asbjørn Bjørnsen Frafjord
- 1867–1869: Rev. Laurentius Borchsenius Fredrik Fabritius
- 1870–1870: Osmund Guttormsen Espedal
- 1871–1873: Ole Halvorsen Eskeland
- 1874–1875: Guttorm Tollefsen Bergsagel
- 1876–1881: Andreas Asbjørnsen Høle
- 1882–1883: Guttorm Tollefsen Bergsagel
- 1884–1887: Rasmus Osmundsen Oanæs
- 1888–1895: Rev. Jakob Bernhoff Gregusson
- 1896–1897: Guttorm Tollefsen Bergsagel
- 1898–1913: Gabriel Espedal
- 1914–1916: Ola Bergsaker
- 1917–1922: Gabriel Espedal
- 1923–1931: Ola Bergsaker
- 1932–1945: Trygve Bergsåker
- 1946–1951: Tobias Horve
- 1952–1957: Samuel Ims, Jr.
- 1958–1962: Leif Espedal
- 1963–1963: Samuel Ims, Jr.
- 1964–1964: Trygve Bergsåker

== See also ==
- List of former municipalities of Norway
