= Torger Motland =

Norwegian footballer (born 1985)

Personal information
- Full name: Torger Motland
- Date of birth: 26 March 1985 (age 41)
- Place of birth: Hommersåk, Norway
- Height: 1.93 m (6 ft 4 in)
- Position: Midfielder

Team information
- Current team: Riska

Youth career
- –2001: Riska
- 2002: Sandnes Ulf
- 2003–2005: Viking

Senior career*
Years	Team	Apps	(Gls)
2005–2006	Viking	2	(0)
2005–2006	→ Bryne (loan)	17	(1)
2007	Mandalskameratene	13	(1)
2008–2009	Stavanger	45	(13)
2010	FH Hafnarfjörður	14	(3)
2011	Randaberg	29	(9)
2012–2014	Ålgård	40	(6)
2015–	Riska		
- * Club domestic league appearances and goals

Torger Motland (born 26 March 1985) is a Norwegian football striker who currently plays for Riska FK. His previous clubs include Viking, Stavanger, Bryne, Mandalskameratene, FH Hafnarfjörður and Ålgård.

He started his career in Riska, and also played youth football for Sandnes Ulf and Viking. His first senior club was Bryne, on loan from Viking.

When he was in Viking he was used as a substitute in one game in Norwegian Premier League.

== Career statistics ==
Season	Club	Division	League		Cup		Total	
Season	Club	Division	Apps	Goals	Apps	Goals	Apps	Goals
2005	Bryne	1. divisjon	4	0	0	0	4	0
2006	Bryne	1. divisjon	13	1	0	0	13	1
2006	Viking	Tippeligaen	2	0	0	0	2	0
2007	Mandalskameratene	1. divisjon	13	1	0	0	13	1
2008	Stavanger	2. divisjon	26	9	1	0	27	9
2009	Stavanger	1. divisjon	19	4	1	0	20	4
2010	FH Hafnarfjörður	Úrvalsdeild	14	3	4	0	18	3
2011	Randaberg	1. divisjon	29	9	3	1	32	10
2012	Ålgård	2. divisjon	27	4	2	0	29	4
2013	Ålgård	2. divisjon	13	2	1	0	14	2
Career Total			160	33	14	1	174	34
