= Hinna =

Borough of Stavanger, Norway

Hinna bydel
- Borough
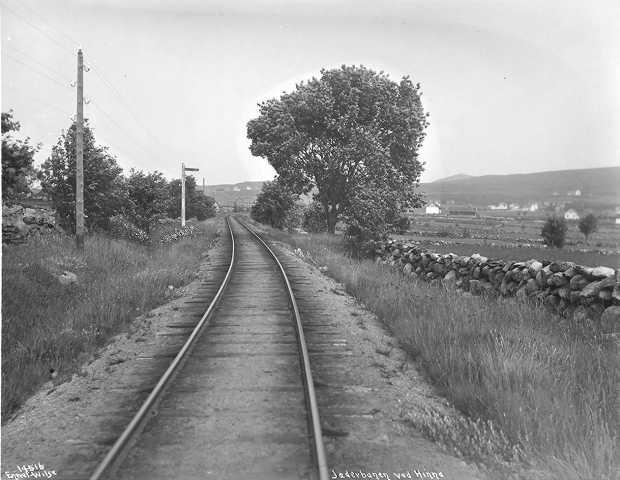

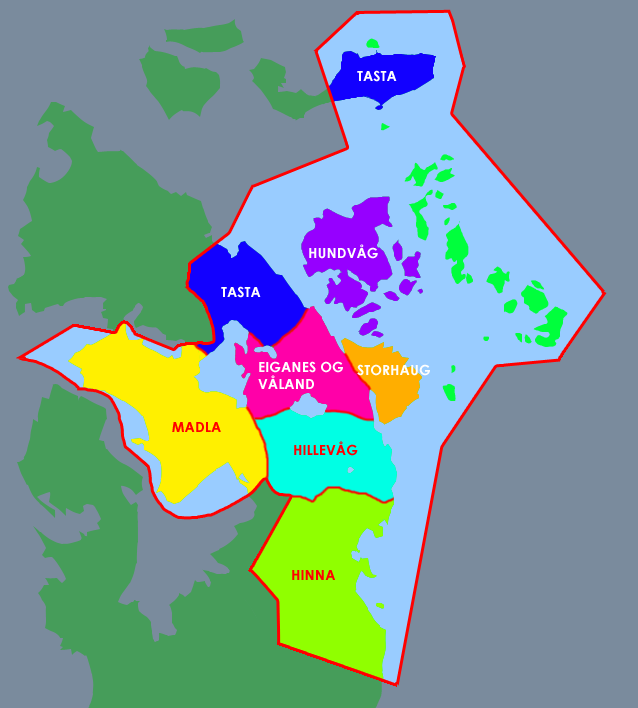
- Location within Stavanger municipality
- Coordinates: 58°55′21″N 05°43′25″E
- Country: Norway
- Region: Western Norway
- County: Rogaland
- District: Jæren
- City: Stavanger

Area
  - Total: 15 km^{2} (5.8 sq mi)
- Elevation: 9 m (30 ft)

Population (2024)
  - Total: 23,809
  - Density: 1,600/km^{2} (4,100/sq mi)
- Time zone: UTC+01:00 (CET)
  - Summer (DST): UTC+02:00 (CEST)
- Post Code: 4018 Stavanger

Hinna is a borough of the city of Stavanger which lies in the southwestern part of the large Stavanger Municipality in Rogaland county, Norway. The borough includes the southernmost part of the city, bordering Sandnes Municipality to the south. The borough of Hillevåg lies to the north, Sola Municipality lies to the west, and the Gandsfjorden lies to the east. Hillevåg was a part of the old Hetland Municipality until 1965. The borough has residential areas as well as some industrial areas, especially relating to the oil industry. The 15-square-kilometre (3,700-acre) borough has a population (2024) of 23,809.

== Neighbourhoods ==
Although the borders of "neighbourhoods" (delområder) do not correspond exactly to the borough borders, Hinna roughly consists of the following neighbourhoods: Jåtten, Gausel, Godeset, Forus, and southern Vaulen.

== Politics ==
The borough is not independently self-governing, but it falls under the municipal council for Stavanger Municipality. The municipal council has delegated some responsibilities to the a borough council (Norwegian: bydelsutvalg) for Hinna. The borough council consists of 11 members. The tables below show the current and historical composition of the borough council by political party.

Hinna bydelsutvalg 2023–2027
Party name (in Norwegian)	Number of representatives
Labour Party (Arbeiderpartiet)	3
Progress Party (Fremskrittspartiet)	1
Green Party (Miljøpartiet De Grønne)	1
Conservative Party (Høyre)	2
Christian Democratic Party (Kristelig Folkeparti)	1
Pensioners' Party (Pensjonistpartiet)	1
Red Party (Rødt)	1
Centre Party (Senterpartiet)	1
Total number of members:	11

Hinna bydelsutvalg 2019–2023
Party name (in Norwegian)	Number of representatives
Labour Party (Arbeiderpartiet)	4
Progress Party (Fremskrittspartiet)	1
Green Party (Miljøpartiet De Grønne)	1
Conservative Party (Høyre)	2
Christian Democratic Party (Kristelig Folkeparti)	1
Pensioners' Party (Pensjonistpartiet)	1
Centre Party (Senterpartiet)	1
Total number of members:	11

Hinna bydelsutvalg 2015–2019
Party name (in Norwegian)	Number of representatives
Labour Party (Arbeiderpartiet)	3
Progress Party (Fremskrittspartiet)	1
Green Party (Miljøpartiet De Grønne)	1
Conservative Party (Høyre)	2
Christian Democratic Party (Kristelig Folkeparti)	1
Pensioners' Party (Pensjonistpartiet)	1
Centre Party (Senterpartiet)	1
Liberal Party (Venstre)	1
Total number of members:	11
