= Stavanger Airport, Forus =

Airport in Rogaland, Norway

Stavanger Airport, Forus Stavanger lufthavn, Forus
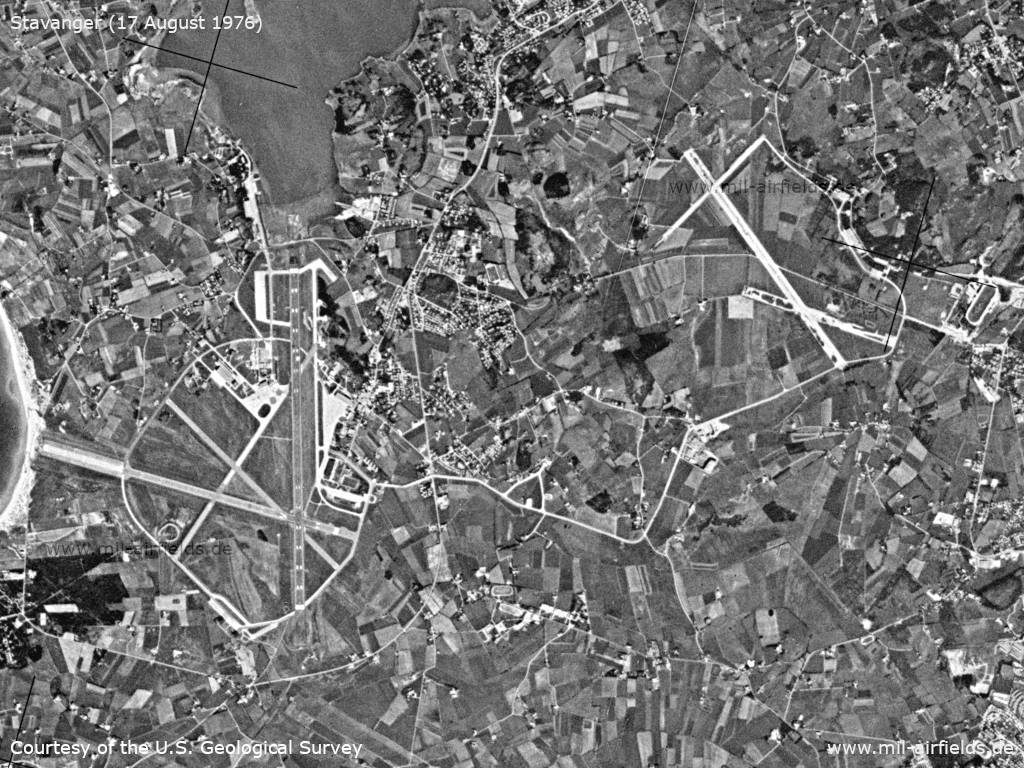
- The two airports Sola and Forus on a satellite image from 1976. Forus on the right.
- IATA: none; ICAO: ENFO

Summary
- Airport type: Military, later civil heliport
- Owner/Operator: Luftwaffe (1940–45); Royal Norwegian Air Force (1945–1966); Helikopter Service (1966–88)
- Serves: Stavanger/Sandnes, Norway
- Location: Forus
- Built: 1940
- Coordinates: 58°53′32″N 5°42′27″E

Map

Runways
Direction	Length		Surface
Direction	m	ft	Surface
14/32 (closed)	1,950	6,398	Concrete
04/22 (closed)	1,200	3,937	Concrete
11/29 (closed)	1,200	3,937	Concrete

Helipads
Number	Length		Surface
Number	m	ft	Surface
11/29 (closed)	120	394	Concrete

Stavanger Airport, Forus (Norwegian: Stavanger lufthavn, Forus: ICAO: ENFO) is a former airport located at Forus in the intersection of the municipalities of Stavanger, Sola and Sandnes. It was built as a military air base by the Luftwaffe following the German occupation of Norway in April 1940. It was gradually expanded so that it by 1943 consisted of three runways, the longest 1,950 meters (6,400 ft). The airfield was connected by a 3.6-kilometer (2.2 mi) taxiway to Sola Air Station. The airport served as an offensive base during the Battle of Britain, and was afterwards made part of the defensive Festung Norwegen.

The hangars saw a limited use after the end of World War II. From 1966 it was taken into use by Helikopter Service, who operated their offshore helicopter services out of Forus to the Ekofisk and Frigg platforms in the North Sea. The heliport saw a major upgrade in 1977, but was after long discussions and delays moved to Stavanger Airport, Sola in 1989. The area has since been redeveloped into a combination of industry and office buildings.

== History ==
=== World War II ===
During the early planning in 1933 of the construction of Stavanger Airport, Sola, the location at Stokkavassbot at Forus had been proposed as a suitable site for an airport, but was discarded in relation to Sola. By 1940, Sola was one of three airfields in Norway. On 3 April 1940, five days before the German occupation of Norway set in, a German Junkers Ju 88 bomber flew over the area and made a forced landing on a field in the area. Before the police were able to apprehend the four airmen, they had set ablaze their aircraft. The aircraft had been shot down by the Royal Navy in the North Sea and had been allowed to land in Norway because of its neutrality.

On 9 April, Sola was captured by 132 German paratroopers, allowing three hundred aircraft to be stationed there. However, the Luftwaffe was concerned about the concentration of the aircraft, as they would be vulnerable for just a single, successful bombing raid. They therefore intended to spread the aircraft over a larger area. Sola, in combination with Kristiansand Airport, Kjevik, was of vital importance for two strategic concerns: controlling Skagerrak, and for a planned invasion of the British Isles. The Germans had developed extensive military plans existed, with possibilities of it expanded towards Forus and a maximum extension to seven runways, of which four would be located in the Forus area. The longest of these was planned to be 5 kilometers (3.1 mi) long.

Construction commenced immediately after the invasion had set foot. The Wehrmacht had set a deadline of 15 August for the expansion to be completed, in time for the Battle of Britain to commence. Luftflotte 5 had a group at the airbase. From 10 April the Luftwaffe needed fifty men for painting, which a contractor in Stavanger was willing to carry out. Gradually the need for a workforce increased as the construction continued. Requisition of the land necessary took place on 19 April, when 3,000 people and 6,000 animals were chased from their homes. Work at Forus commenced on 21 April, originally by putting 350 Norwegian prisoners of war to work, in violation with the Hague Convention. The Wehrmacht initially demanded a workforce of 2,000, which was largely gathered through coercion.

A force of 65 Heinkel He 111s participated from Sola and Kjevik in the raid on Britain, but it was so unsuccessful that Luftflotte 5 would no longer play a role in attacks on Britain. The Wehrmacht gave up on its original plan on 15 September, which also changed the anticipated role for Sola and Forus. The importance of Sola and Forus thus became the need to defend from British attacks, rather than offense. Forus became part of Festung Stavanger—a heavy construction of defensive structures in Jæren—which played a key role in Festung Norwegen. This massive endeavor created a surge in the demand for labor, while the wartime halt to commerce escalated unemployment. Construction was therefore typically carried out by Norwegians, partially voluntary, partially out of dire hunger and partially by force. After the war progressed, work was gradually taken more over by Russian prisoners of war.

Organisation Todt was the central contractor of the works, although they subcontracted much of the work to Norwegian companies. Initially a 1,800-by-40-meter (5,910 by 130 ft) concrete runway was built at Forus. The need for labor increased steadily, and eventually reached 6,000 men. The road between Sola and Sande was closed because it came in the way of the runway, forcing the Germans to build a new connection road. Most of the hangars were completed in 1941. Work on Løvenstrasse, which connected Forus to Sola, commenced in 1943. Three runways were completed by 1944.

=== Military interlude ===
The day following the German surrender on 8 May 1945, Allied aircraft landed and took control over Forus and Sola. At the time there were twenty-six German aircraft at Forus, which included eight Arado Ar 234 jet bombers and fourteen Messerschmitt Bf 108 utility planes. All but two of the German aircraft were destroyed and buried in a dump near the airport. Later that year the airport was taken over by the Directorate for Enemy Property. Most inventory was gradually sold, until the facility was taken over by the state in 1947.

After the war ended there was a discussion as to what Stavanger's two airports should be used for. A government proposition from 1947 called for Sola to be converted to a civilian airport and Forus to become a military air station. Parliament supported the notion on 12 December and granted NOK 1 million for construction to start on 1 February 1948. However, the infrastructure at Forus was in worse condition than the authorities had anticipated. In violation with the parliamentary legislation, the Ministry of Defense and the Ministry of Transport and Communications struck a deal on 22 May, whereby both the military and civilian operations would be located at Sola. However, a limited amount of repairs were carried out at Forus for another year.

The airport's value was estimated at NOK 20 million. A sabotage of the drainage system was discovered in 1949, which explained many of the technical challenges affiliated with the runways. This was decisive in putting off the military desire to hang on to the facility. Sola Air Station took the three large hangars and a barracks into use, while the rest of the airfield was decommissioned. A NOK 6.7 million estimate to bring the airport back into shape was found to be not worth the cost.

After the war the Royal Norwegian Air Force considered using Forus as an air station. In 1959 and 1960 the military carried out an extensive renovation of the runway, mainly intended to make it more level. Holes were drilled at suitable places and a mixture of concrete, sand and earth was injected to get the concrete blocks to rise in the desired locations. In addition, the cracks between the blocks were cleaned and filled with asphalt. Of the 88 mines which had been built into the runway, 86 were removed in 1961. The last two had to be blown up. Shortly after the renovations were completed, the military decided that it did not want to use the airfield. Løvenstrasse was converted to a public road in 1959 and 1960, which cost 400,000 Norwegian krone. It is today largely part of National Road 44. Part of the road was named Forusbeen in 1984.

=== Civilian operations ===
Esso Exploration Norway was in 1966 granted permission to search for oil on the Norwegian continental shelf 140 kilometers (87 mi) southwest of Stavanger, in what became known as Ekofisk. Helikopter Service was contracted to fly crew to their rig, Ocean Traveller, and bought two Sikorsky S-61N helicopters to carry out the job. Helikopter Service made Forus its main base, signing agreement with the Ministry of Defense to lease the grounds, which remained owned by the state.

Helikopter Service invested NOK 20 million in the two helicopters, as well as NOK 15 million in the airport. It took over one of the large hangars at Godeset as well as a number of smaller buildings left over from the war. The first flight took off on 18 July 1966. The company flew 250 hours out of Forus in the first year of operation, although this increased to 4,500 hours in 1972. By 1975 the company had built a 4,400 square meters (47,000 sq ft) complex at the airport.

The government and local authorities decided in 1975 that Forus was to become a business district for the booming oil industry. A plot of 145 hectares (360 acres) of military land at Forus was therefore sold to Forus Industritomtselskap that year. At the same time Helikopter Service asked for negotiations with the state so they could purchase a sufficient lot to continue operations at Forus. This was met with local protests, including from the Norwegian Public Roads Administration, who stated it was too close to the highway, and from companies planning to establish themselves at Forus. Most of the complaints were directed at noise pollution. The following negotiations included four ministries and various government agencies. The main concern regarding an establishment at Sola was that it did not have sufficient space for a heliport.

Stavanger City Council supported a continuation at Forus at its meeting on 1 December 1975. Helikopter Service signed an agreement with Forus Industritomtselskap in January 1976 for the purchase of 105 hectares (260 acres) of land. A new highway would cut their old premises in two and were therefore forced to build an all-new facility. Local protests endured and the city decided in 1977 to not approve the zoning plan. Negotiations were carried out by the Ministry of Transport, where at a meeting on 15 March 1977 a compromise was reached. Helikopter Service would build a terminal would could easily be converted to an industrial facility and this would be sold to Forus Industritomtselskap at an undecided point in the future. The airport would only receive operating permissions for a period of three years and the helicopter company would have to move to Sola at an undetermined future date.

The new terminal was taken into use on 11 January 1978, with the new facilities having cost NOK 33 million. By 1981 the investments had increased to NOK 50 million. The government extended the operating permit to 1 July 1982 on 26 June 1980. A new heliport was being planned at Sola, but constant delays caused Forus to remain in use and gradually extensions of the operating permit. Helikopter Service therefore remained at Forus until 1989.

== Facilities ==
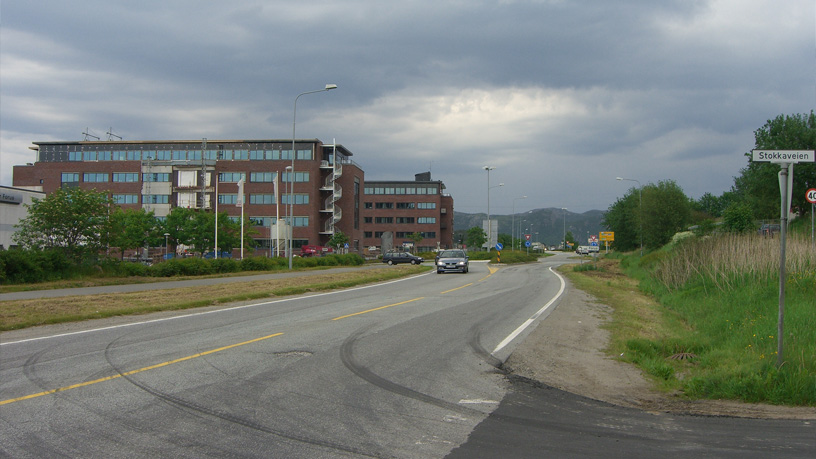
Løwenstrasse has been converted to County Road 349, but still bears the old name

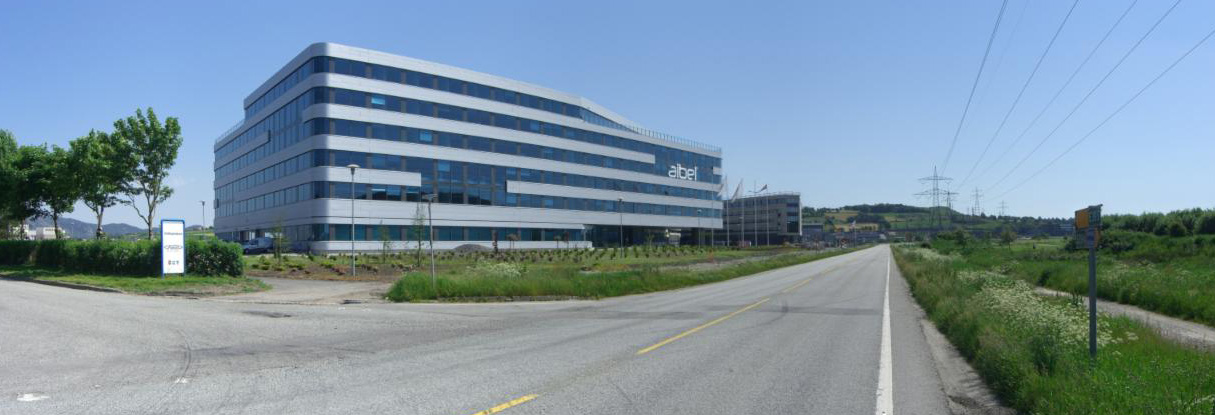
Part of the former taxiway now converted to the road Forusbeen

=== Luftwaffe ===
The airport was located in the Forus area, which is at the intersection of three municipalities: Stavanger, Sandnes and Sola. The site is that of a former lake, Stokkavatnet, which had been drained to create agricultural land. The Luftwaffe facilities at Forus consisted of three runways. The main one measured 1,950 by 80 meters (6,400 by 260 ft) and aligned southeast–northwest. It was crossed, not quite at a right angle at its southern end by a runway dimensioned 1,200 by 40 meters (3,940 by 130 ft). Another ran east–west and measured 1,200 by 80 meters (3,940 by 260 ft) and crossed the main runway at the northern end. Forus was connected to Sola by way of a 3,650-by-18.1-meter (11,975 by 59 ft) taxiway, named Løwenstrasse, allowing Forus and Sola to exchange aircraft. It connected to the main runway at the south

To increase the airport's defensive position, the hangars were spread around the Sola, Forus and Jåttå area. Some farms had as many as eight hangars on their property. Most were simple constructions in non-reinforced concrete, typically with three walls and camouflage netting on the fourth side. Taxiways were normally built of wood. The three largest hangars were built at Godeset, two measuring 120 by 35 meters (394 by 115 ft) and one 85 by 40 meters (279 by 131 ft). The Luftwaffe placed a series of dummy aircraft in suitable locations. The Luftwaffe built a series of other buildings and structures at the airfield. The largest non-hangar was known as the canteen and measured 1,800 square meters (19,000 sq ft), including a 1,350 square meters (14,500 sq ft) hall. The buildings were collected in two main clusters, one around the large hangars and one around the canteen. The airfield was surrounded by an extensive network of anti-aircraft guns.

Forus had several factors which contributed to difficult aviation conditions and accidents. The runways were not well-leveled, in part because of poor workmanship and in part because of soft soil. The area had poor lift and was often covered in fog, and the area experienced difficult wind conditions and air pockets. Hard landings and runway overruns were commonplace.

=== Heliport ===
During the period Helikopter Service operated at Forus, the company had a monopoly on offshore helicopter flights. Forus Heliport served two offshore installations, Ekofisk and Frigg. They originally operated out of the old hangars, but from 1981 the airport had received a make-over. The new runway was 420 meters (1,380 ft) long and had three pods.
