= Gausel =

Norwegian neighborhood in Stavanger

Coordinates: 58°54′N 5°42′E

Gausel is a neighborhood (delområde) in the city of Stavanger which lies in the southwestern part of the large municipality of Stavanger in Rogaland county, Norway. It is located in the borough of Hinna between the neighborhoods of Jåttå, Godeset, and Forus and the Gandsfjorden.

== History ==
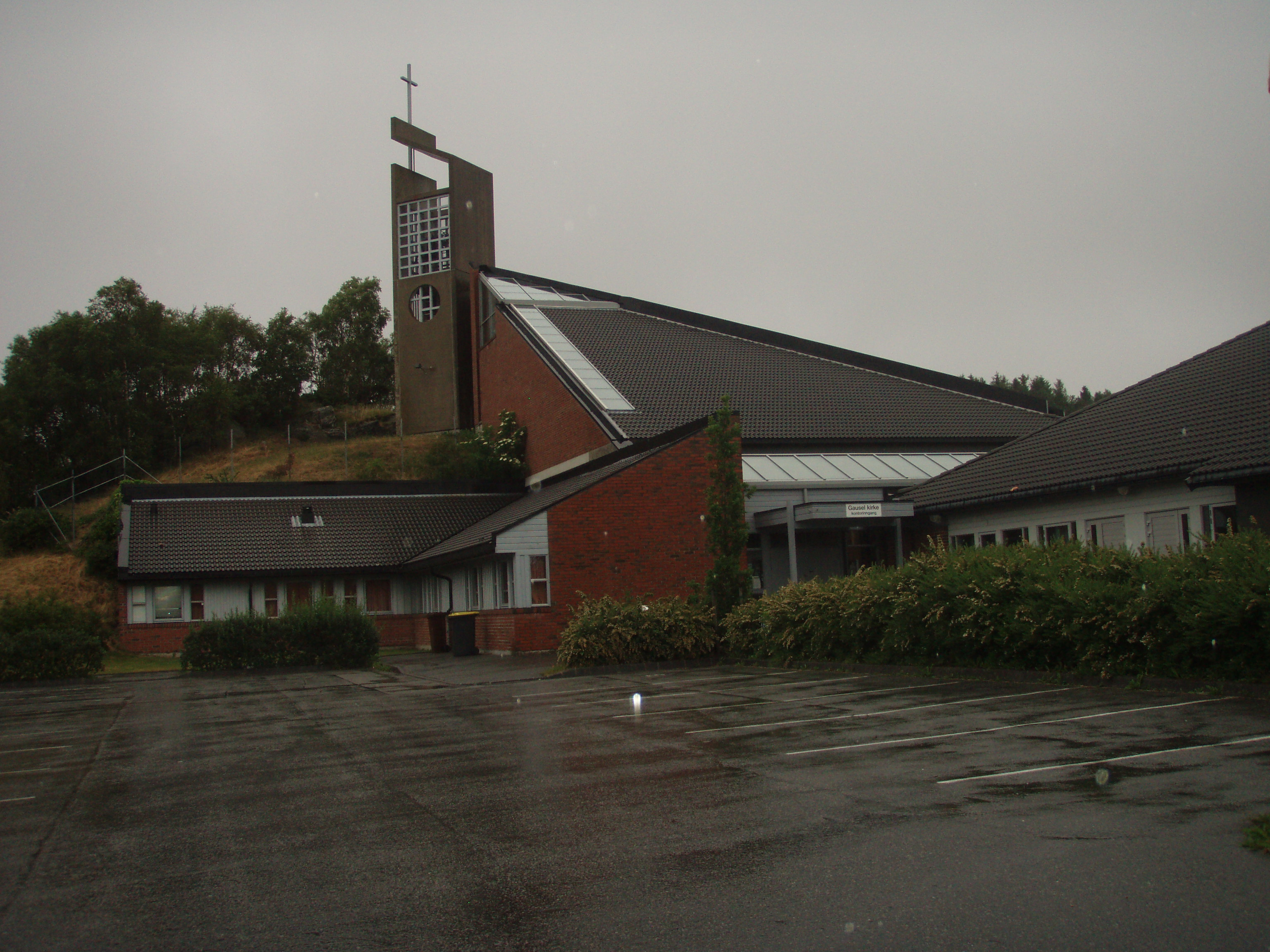
Gausel Church

Until the 1980s, Gausel was primary farmland. From the 1990s onwards, increased settlement has taken place, and new service facilities have been built. The Gausel Church was built in 1996. The Stavanger branch of the cash management company NOKAS was relocated to Gausel, after the robbery incident in central Stavanger in 2004.

The Jæren Line, a railway line that is part of the Sørland Line, passes through Gausel. Gausel Station was operative from 1902 and until the mid-1960s. The old station was taken down and a new station was constructed and it opened in December 2009. It is one of the four railway stations that are part of the new double track between Stavanger and Sandnes, which opened in November 2009.

The Joint Warfare Centre (JWC) was established in 2003 in Jåttånuten, a NATO facility used for training and education.

== Nature reserve ==
The nature reserve Gauselskogen is an old forested area located at Gausel. It covers an area of 55,000 square metres (14 acres), and was established as a nature reserve by law in 1984. It is a broad-leaf forest, mainly oaks, but also elms, maples, beech, and hazels, a mixture of large trees and undergrowth giving rise to a rich birdlife.

== Archaeological site ==
At the western side of Gauselskogen is an archaeological site, with most notably a rich woman's grave dating from the Viking Age. The grave, also called a "queen's grave", was discovered in 1883, and is regarded among the richest women's graves from the Viking Age. Several objects found in 1883 showed Irish heritage (Vikings ruled parts of Ireland during various historical periods). About forty objects were registered, including silver and bronze clasps, silver arm rings, a finger-ring, pearls, knives, a bit and furnishings, cooking equipment, and parts of a reliquary. The objects are part of the collections at Bergen Museum.

New examinations of the location were done in 1997. These uncovered settlements from the early Iron Age, and nearby boat graves dated from the late Iron Age.
