= Gausel Church =

Church in Rogaland, Norway

- Gausel kirke
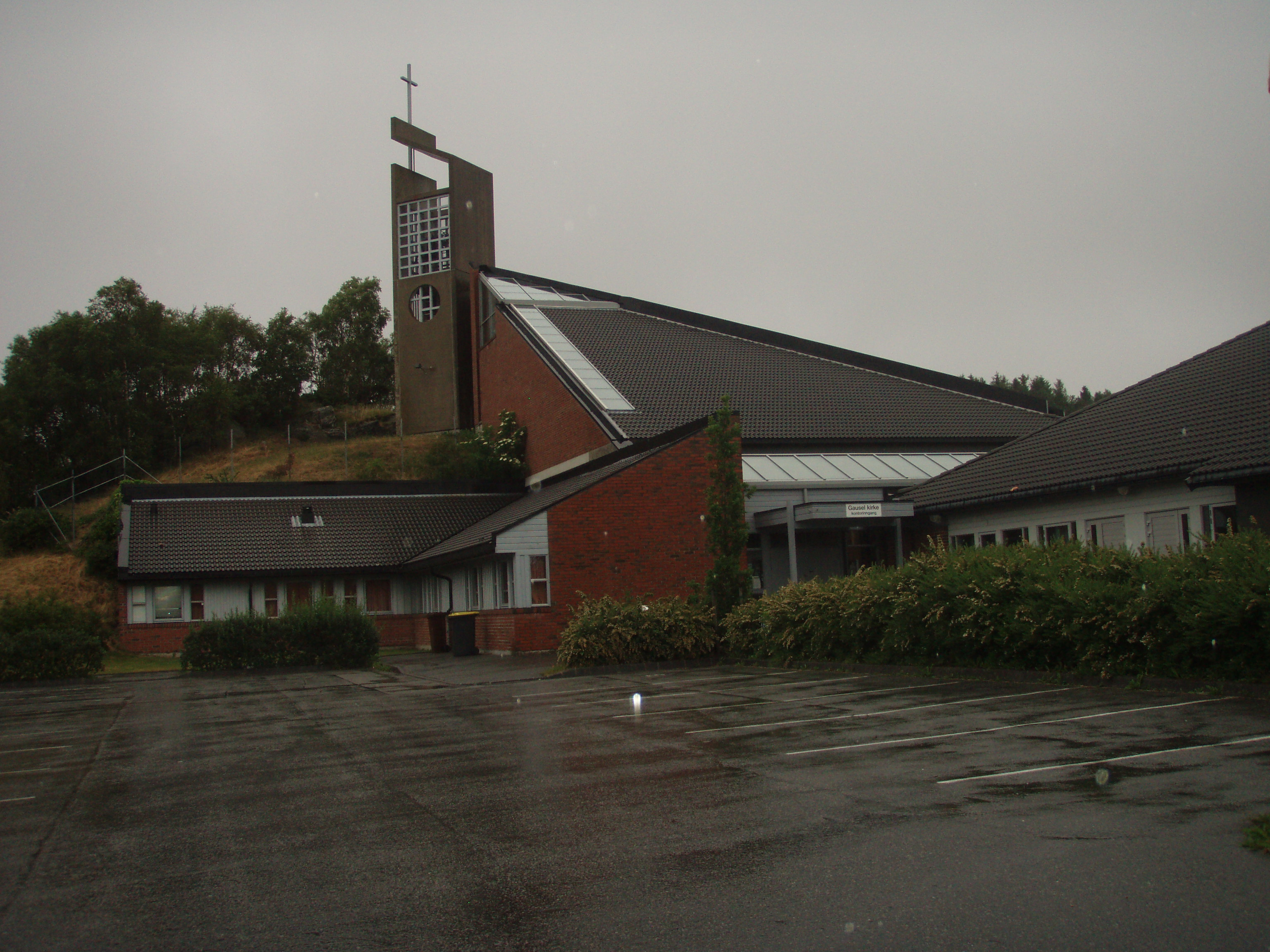
- Gausel Church
- 58.89864°N 5.722519°E
- Location: Stavanger Municipality, Rogaland
- Country: Norway
- Denomination: Church of Norway
- Churchmanship: Evangelical Lutheran

History
- Status: Parish church
- Founded: 1996
- Consecrated: 1996

Architecture
- Functional status: Active
- Architect: Byarkitekten
- Architectural type: Fan-shaped
- Completed: 1996

Specifications
- Capacity: 450
- Materials: Brick

Administration
- Diocese: Stavanger bispedømme
- Deanery: Ytre Stavanger prosti
- Parish: Gausel

Gausel Church (Norwegian: Gausel kirke) is a parish church of the Church of Norway in the southern part of the large Stavanger Municipality in Rogaland county, Norway. It is located in the Gausel neighborhood in the borough of Hinna in the southern part of the city of Stavanger. It is the church for the Gausel parish which is part of the Ytre Stavanger prosti (deanery) in the Diocese of Stavanger. The red brick church was built in a fan-shaped design in 1996 using designs by city architect (Byarkitekten). The church seats about 450 people.

== See also ==
- List of churches in Rogaland
