= Vaulen =

Neighborhood in Stavanger, Norway

Coordinates: 58°55′35″N 5°44′19″E

Vaulen is a neighborhood (delområde) in the city of Stavanger which lies in the southwestern part of the large municipality of Stavanger in Rogaland county, Norway. It is located along the Gandsfjorden in the boroughs of Hillevåg and Hinna. The neighborhood has a population of 6,039 which is distributed over an area of 3.4 square kilometres (840 acres).
