= Godeset =

Neighborhood of Stavanger, Norway

Coordinates: 58°53′51″N 5°42′49″E

Godeset is a neighborhood (delområde) in the city of Stavanger which lies in the southwestern part of the large municipality of Stavanger in Rogaland county, Norway. It is located in the borough of Hinna, between Gausel and Forus. In Godeset, one can find a number of small industries as well as service industries. Godeset School and Gautesete School are the schools in Godeset. Godeset was an agricultural area until around 1985. The Godeset area stretches from Jåttånuten hill in the north and down to Statoil's headquarters at Forus in the south.
