= Frue Church =

Church in Rogaland, Norway

- Frue kirke Hetlandskirken
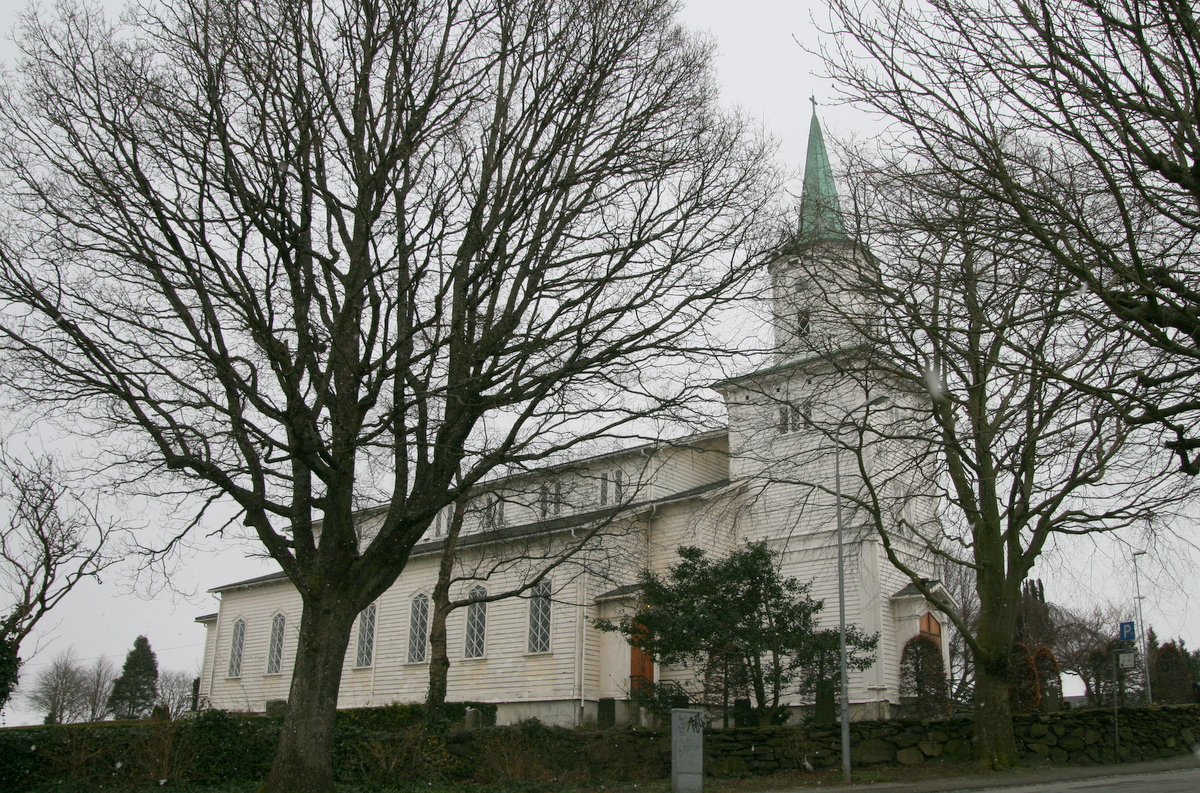
- View of the church
- Frue Church
- 58.968150°N 5.741102°E
- Location: Stavanger Municipality, Rogaland
- Country: Norway
- Denomination: Church of Norway
- Churchmanship: Evangelical Lutheran

History
- Former name: Hetland Church
- Status: Parish church
- Founded: 1854
- Consecrated: 1854

Architecture
- Functional status: Active
- Architect: Hans Hansen Kaas
- Architectural type: Long church
- Completed: 1854 (172 years ago)

Specifications
- Capacity: 700
- Materials: Wood

Administration
- Diocese: Stavanger bispedømme
- Deanery: Stavanger domprosti
- Parish: St. Johannes
- Norwegian Cultural Heritage Site
- Type: Church
- Status: Protected
- ID: 84207

Frue Church or Hetland Church (Norwegian: Frue kirke/Hetlandskirken) is a parish church of the Church of Norway in Stavanger Municipality in Rogaland county, Norway. It is located in the borough of Storhaug in the centre of the city of Stavanger. It is one of the two churches for the St. Johannes parish which is part of the Stavanger domprosti (arch-deanery) in the Diocese of Stavanger. The white, wooden church was built in the long church style in 1854 using designs by the architect Hans Hansen Kaas. The church seats about 700 people.

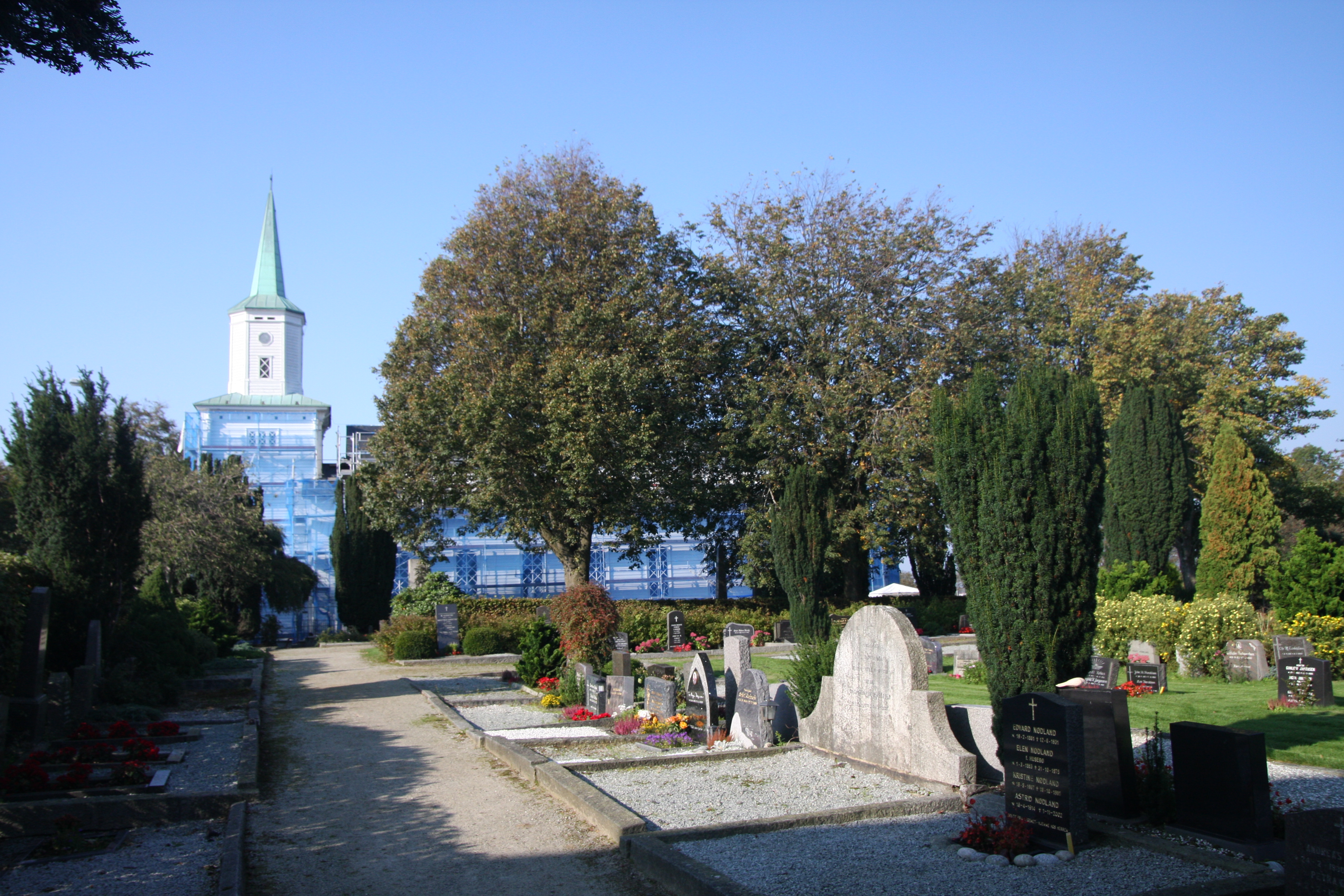
View of the church

The church was originally built as the main church for the old Hetland Municipality and it was known as Hetland Church, but after it was merged into the city of Stavanger, the church has been officially known as Frue Church, however the old name is still in use.

== See also ==
- List of churches in Rogaland
- Informationen zur Jehmlich Orgel in der Frue Kirke in Stavanger
