= Riska Church =

Church in Rogaland, Norway

- Riska kirke
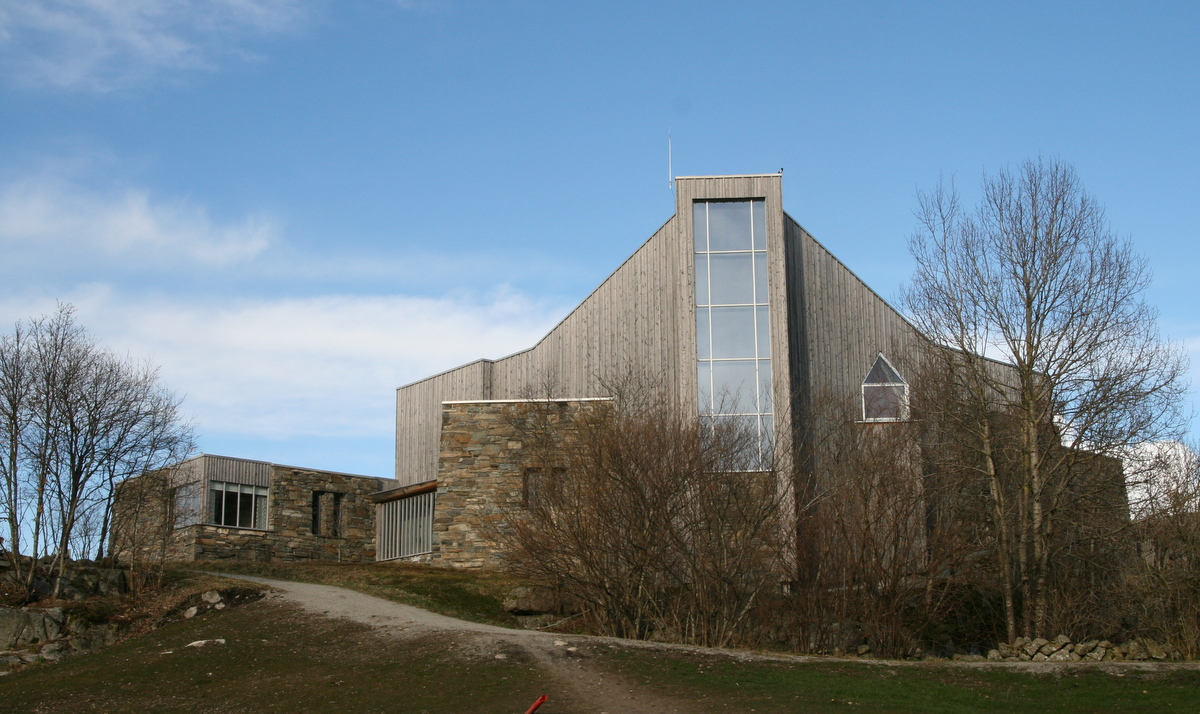
- View of the church
- Riska Church
- 58.92773°N 5.854159°E
- Location: Sandnes, Rogaland
- Country: Norway
- Denomination: Church of Norway
- Churchmanship: Evangelical Lutheran

History
- Status: Parish church
- Founded: 1999
- Consecrated: 1999

Architecture
- Functional status: Active
- Architect: Odd Magne Vatne
- Architectural type: Fan-shaped
- Completed: 1999

Specifications
- Capacity: 520
- Materials: Concrete and stone

Administration
- Diocese: Stavanger bispedømme
- Deanery: Sandnes prosti
- Parish: Riska

Riska Church (Norwegian: Riska kirke) is a parish church of the Church of Norway in the large Sandnes Municipality in Rogaland county, Norway. It is located in the village of Hommersåk in the borough of Riska, east of the centre of the city of Sandnes in the western part of the municipality. It is one of the two churches for the Riska parish which is part of the Sandnes prosti (deanery) in the Diocese of Stavanger. The concrete-and-stone church was built in a fan-shaped design in 1999, using plans drawn up by the architect Odd Magne Vatne. The church seats about 520 people, more than twice as many as the Old Riska Church, which this building replaced.

The Old Riska Church was used for this parish from 1877 until its retirement in 1999 after the new Riska Church was completed. The old church has only been used for special occasions since this church opened.

== See also ==
- List of churches in Rogaland
