= Høle =

Borough in Sandnes, Norway

Bydel Høle
- Borough
- Coat of arms

- Location within Sandnes Municipality
- Interactive map of Bydel Høle
- Coordinates: 58°53′44″N 06°00′33″E
- Country: Norway
- Region: Western Norway
- County: Rogaland
- District: Jæren
- City: Sandnes

Area
  - Total: 101.4 km^{2} (39.2 sq mi)
- Elevation: 22 m (72 ft)

Population (2016)
  - Total: 1,042
  - Density: 10.28/km^{2} (26.62/sq mi)
- Time zone: UTC+01:00 (CET)
  - Summer (DST): UTC+02:00 (CEST)
- Post Code: 4308 Sandnes

Høle is a borough and a village in the central part of the large Sandnes Municipality in Rogaland county, Norway, located along the Høgsfjorden. The area was historically a part of the municipality of Høle. Høle Church and Høle School are both located in the village.

The 0.35-square-kilometre (86-acre) village has a population (2025) of 438, giving the village a population density of 1,251 inhabitants per square kilometre (3,240/sq mi). The borough of Høle is one of the least populous boroughs in the city of Sandnes with 1,042 inhabitants (2016). The 101.4-square-kilometre (39.2 sq mi) borough is located in the central part of the municipality.
