= Riska =

Borough in Sandnes, Norway

Bydel Riska
- Borough
- Coat of arms

- Location within Sandnes Municipality
- Interactive map of Bydel Riska
- Coordinates: 58°55′N 05°50′E
- Country: Norway
- Region: Western Norway
- County: Rogaland
- District: Jæren
- City: Sandnes

Area
  - Total: 66.5 km^{2} (25.7 sq mi)
- Elevation: 61 m (200 ft)

Population (2016)
  - Total: 7,294
  - Density: 110/km^{2} (284/sq mi)
- Time zone: UTC+01:00 (CET)
  - Summer (DST): UTC+02:00 (CEST)
- Post Code: 4310 Hommersåk

Riska is a borough of the city of Sandnes which lies in the central part of the large Sandnes Municipality in Rogaland county, Norway. The borough sits northeast of the city centre. The Gandsfjorden runs along the west side of the borough and the Høgsfjorden along the northeast side. The 66.5-square-kilometre (25.7 sq mi) borough has a population (2016) of 7,294.

The main village in the borough of Riska is Hommersåk where the Riska Church and Old Riska Church are located. The local sports team is Riska IL. The island of Uskjo is part of the borough.
