= Kalvøy, Stavanger =

Island in Rogaland, Norway

Kalvøy
- Interactive map of the island

Geography
- Location: Rogaland, Norway
- Coordinates: 58.97661°N 5.83459°E
- Area: 0.58 km^{2} (0.22 sq mi)
- Length: 1.3 km (0.81 mi)
- Width: 730 m (2400 ft)
- Coastline: 4.1 km (2.55 mi)
- Highest elevation: 28 m (92 ft)

Administration
- Norway
- County: Rogaland
- Municipality: Stavanger Municipality

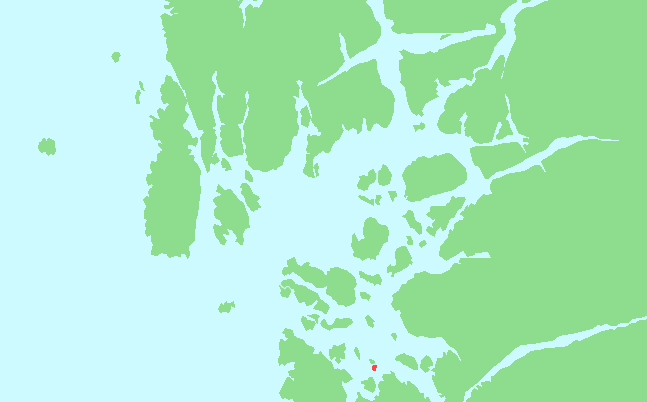
Locator map of Kalvøy, Rogaland, Norway.

Kalvøy is an island in Stavanger Municipality in Rogaland county, Norway. The 0.58-square-kilometre (140-acre) island lies in an archipelago at the mouths of the Gandsfjorden and Høgsfjorden, about 4.5 kilometres (2.8 mi) east of the centre of the city of Stavanger. The island lies just south of the islands of Lindøy and Hellesøy and together, the three islands form a "neighborhood" within the city of Stavanger. In 2016, the three islands had a total combined population of 26. The island is only accessible by boat. The island of Uskjo lies about 1 kilometre (0.62 mi) to the south (in Sandnes Municipality).

== See also ==
- List of islands of Norway
