= Høle Church =

Church in Rogaland, Norway

- Høle kyrkje
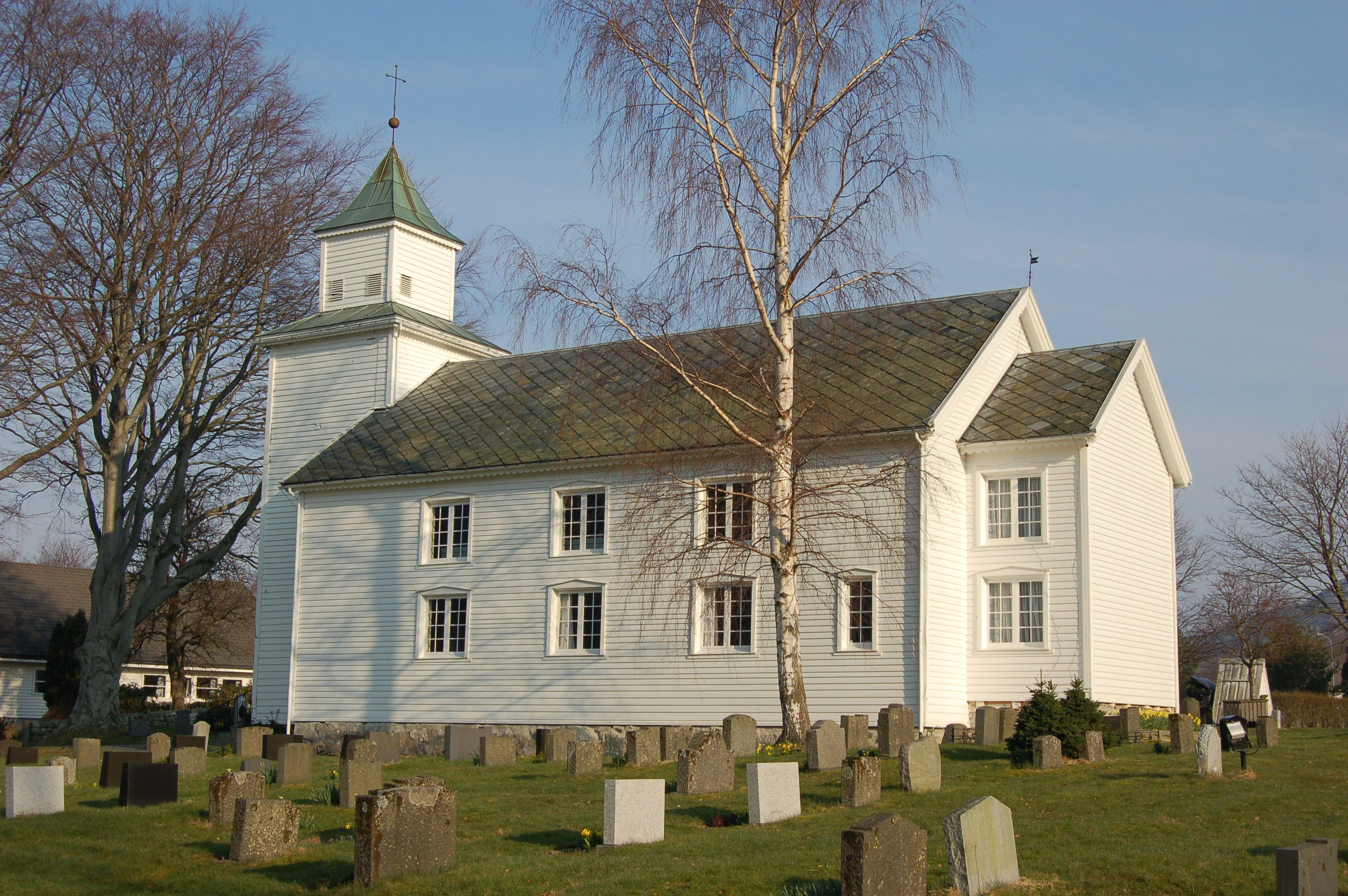
- View of the church
- Høle Church
- 58.89689°N 6.008325°E
- Location: Sandnes, Rogaland
- Country: Norway
- Denomination: Church of Norway
- Churchmanship: Evangelical Lutheran

History
- Status: Parish church
- Founded: 12th century
- Consecrated: 24 Oct 1860

Architecture
- Functional status: Active
- Architect: Georg Andreas Bull
- Architectural type: Long church
- Completed: 1860 (166 years ago)

Specifications
- Capacity: 230
- Materials: Wood

Administration
- Diocese: Stavanger bispedømme
- Deanery: Sandnes prosti
- Parish: Høle
- Norwegian Cultural Heritage Site
- Type: Church
- Status: Protected
- ID: 84692

Høle Church (Norwegian: Høle kyrkje) is a parish church of the Church of Norway in the large Sandnes Municipality in Rogaland county, Norway. It is located in the village of Høle in the central part of the municipality. It is the church for the Høle parish which is part of the Sandnes prosti (deanery) in the Diocese of Stavanger. The white, wooden church was built in a long church design in 1860 using designs by the architect Georg Andreas Bull. The church seats about 230 people.

== History ==
The earliest existing historical records of the church date back to the year 1270, but it was not new that year. The medieval stave church stood at Høle until 1616 when it was torn down. A new timber-framed church was constructed on the same site soon afterwards.

In 1814, this church served as an election church (Norwegian: valgkirke). Together with more than 300 other parish churches across Norway, it was a polling station for elections to the 1814 Norwegian Constituent Assembly which wrote the Constitution of Norway. This was Norway's first national elections. Each church parish was a constituency that elected people called "electors" who later met together in each county to elect the representatives for the assembly that was to meet at Eidsvoll Manor later that year.

In 1860, a new church was constructed slightly to the northeast of the old church. A portion of the old stone wall that surrounded the cemetery was used as part of the foundation of the new church. After the new church was consecrated on 24 October 1860, the old church was torn down. Many of the materials from the old church were sold at auction.

== See also ==
- List of churches in Rogaland
