= Hommersåk =

Village in Sandnes Municipality, Norway

Hommersåk Hommarsåk
- Village
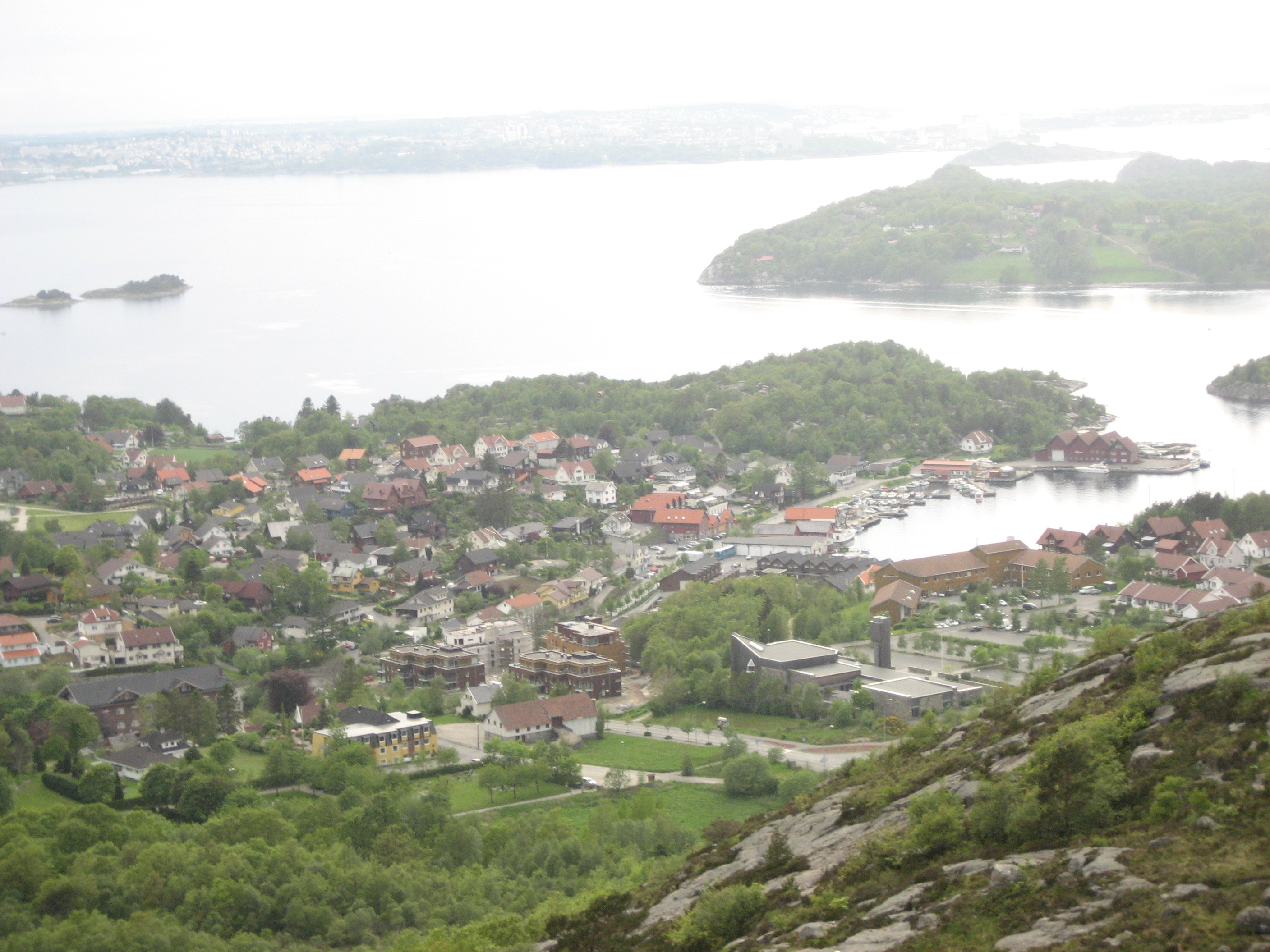
- View of the centre of Hommersåk and the island of Usken seen from the hills of Hommersandfjellet. Stavanger is in the background, across the Gandsfjord
- Interactive map of Hommersåk
- Coordinates: 58.92556°N 5.85104°E
- Country: Norway
- Region: Western Norway
- County: Rogaland
- District: Jæren
- Municipality: Sandnes Municipality

Area
  - Total: 2.24 km^{2} (0.86 sq mi)
- Elevation: 13 m (43 ft)

Population (2025)
  - Total: 6,863
  - Density: 3,464/km^{2} (8,970/sq mi)
- Time zone: UTC+01:00 (CET)
  - Summer (DST): UTC+02:00 (CEST)
- Post Code: 4311 Hommersåk

Hommersåk is a village in Sandnes Municipality in Rogaland county, Norway. The village is located in the borough of Riska in the northern part of the municipality. It is situated about 12 kilometres (7.5 mi) northeast of the centre of the city of Sandnes, along the shore of the Riskafjorden, an arm off the main Gandsfjorden.

The 2.24-square-kilometre (550-acre) village has a population (2025) of 6,863 and a population density of 3,464 inhabitants per square kilometre (8,970/sq mi).

There are a few shops and a small shopping centre called Bryggen. There is also a sports centre with swimming facilities. The village and its surroundings are popular places for cottages and leisure boats among people from the Stavanger/Sandnes area. There are two churches in the village: Riska Church and the historic Old Riska Church. The island of Uskjo lies just off the coast of Hommersåk to the north.

== Transport ==
Hommersåk has bus connections to the city of Sandnes and boat connections to the city of Stavanger, across the fjord.

== Sport ==
The Riska Motorsykkelklubb organise motorcycle trials and previously motorcycle speedway. The speedwaybane held the final of the Norwegian Individual Speedway Championship in 1994, 1996, 1998, 2004, 2010 and 2014.
