= Old Riska Church =

Church in Rogaland, Norway

- Riska gamle kirke
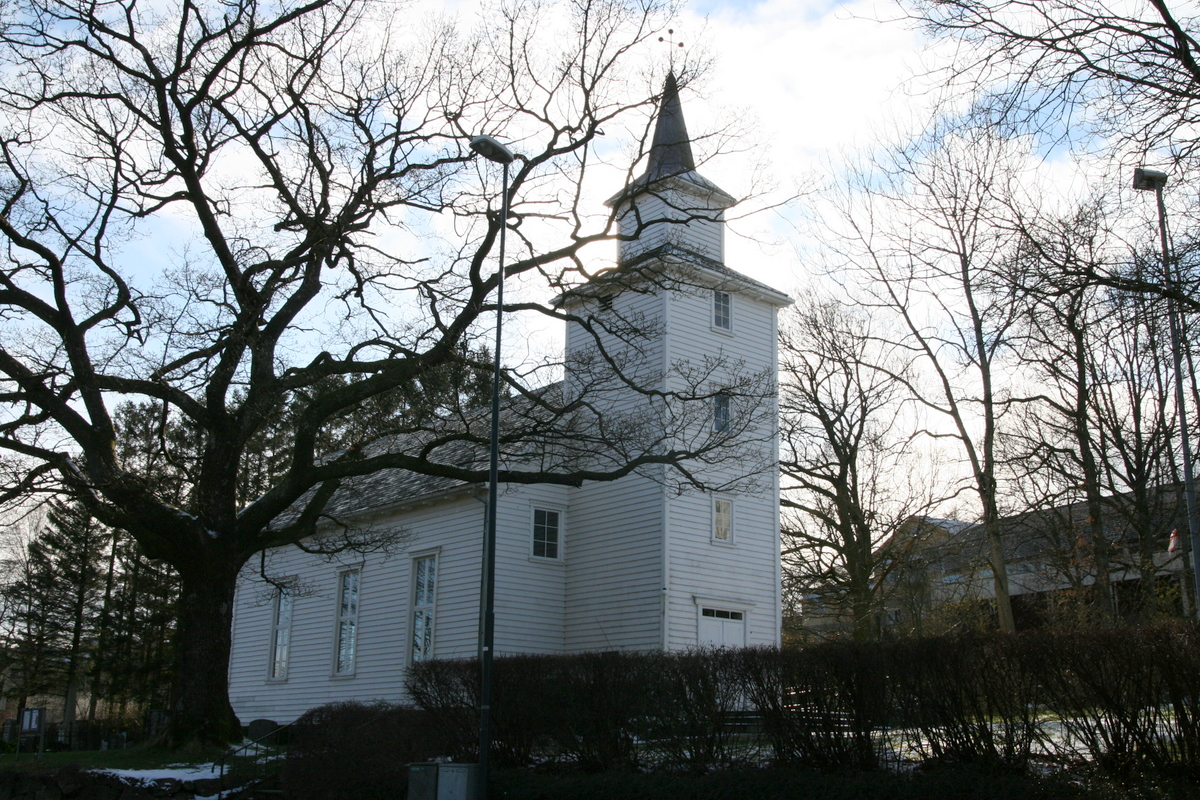
- View of the church
- Old Riska Church
- 58.926229°N 5.851011°E
- Location: Sandnes, Rogaland
- Country: Norway
- Denomination: Church of Norway
- Churchmanship: Evangelical Lutheran

History
- Status: Parish church
- Founded: 1877
- Consecrated: 1877

Architecture
- Functional status: Inactive
- Architect(s): Hans Linstow; Henrik Nissen
- Architectural type: Long church
- Completed: 1877

Specifications
- Capacity: 200
- Materials: Wood

Administration
- Diocese: Stavanger bispedømme
- Deanery: Sandnes prosti
- Parish: Riska
- Norwegian Cultural Heritage Site
- Type: Church
- Status: Not protected
- ID: 85302

Old Riska Church (Norwegian: Riska gamle kirke) is a parish church of the Church of Norway in the large Sandnes Municipality in Rogaland county, Norway. It is located in the village of Hommersåk in the borough of Riska, east of the centre of the city of Sandnes in the western part of the municipality. It is one of the two churches for the Riska parish which is part of the Sandnes prosti (deanery) in the Diocese of Stavanger. The white, wooden church was built in a long church design in 1877, using plans drawn up by the architects Hans Linstow and Henrik Nissen. The church seats about 200 people.

Over time, the church became too small for the parish. In 1999, the church was retired from regular use when the new, much larger Riska Church was completed (about a block to the northeast). Since that time, this church has only been used for special occasions.

== Media gallery ==
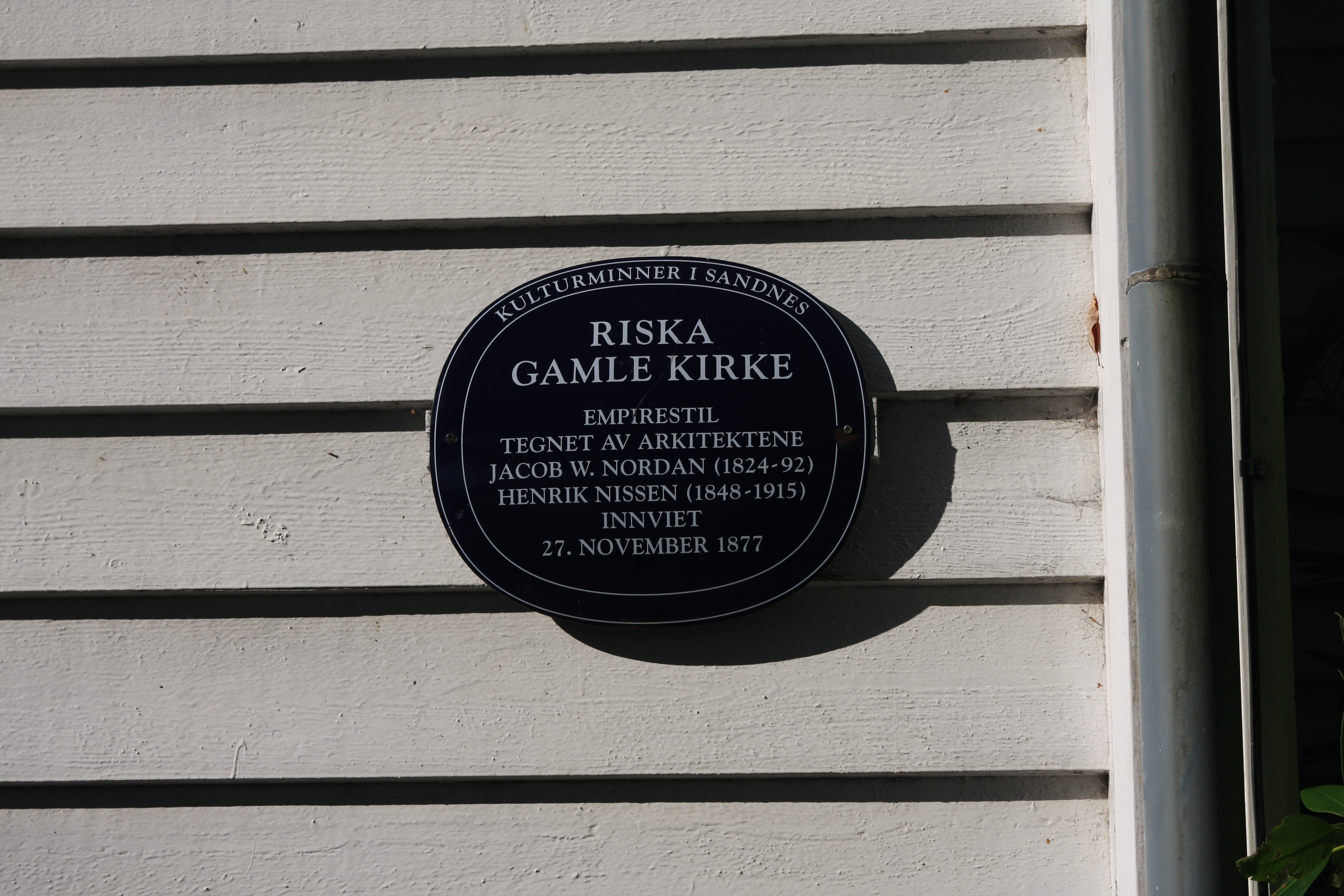

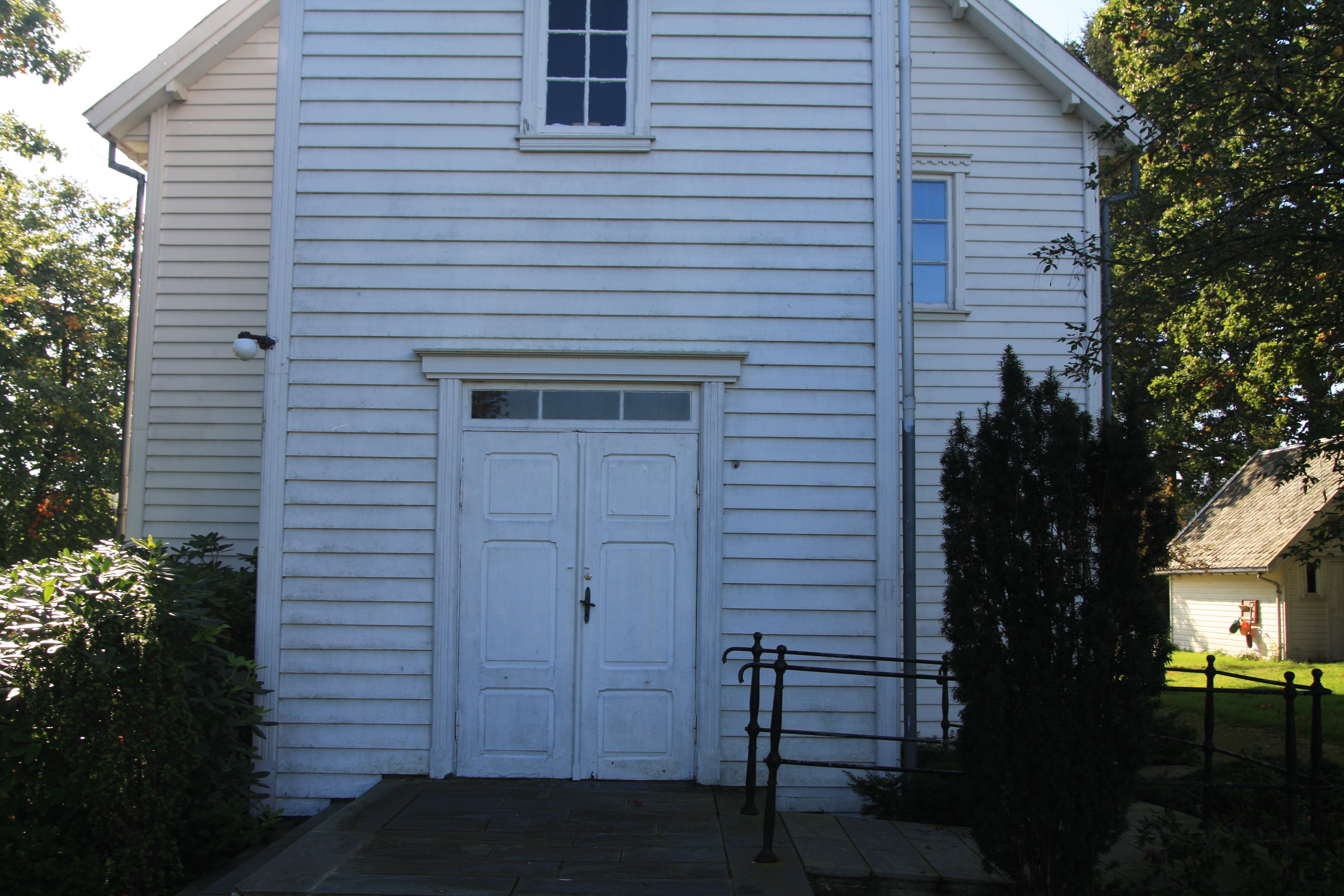

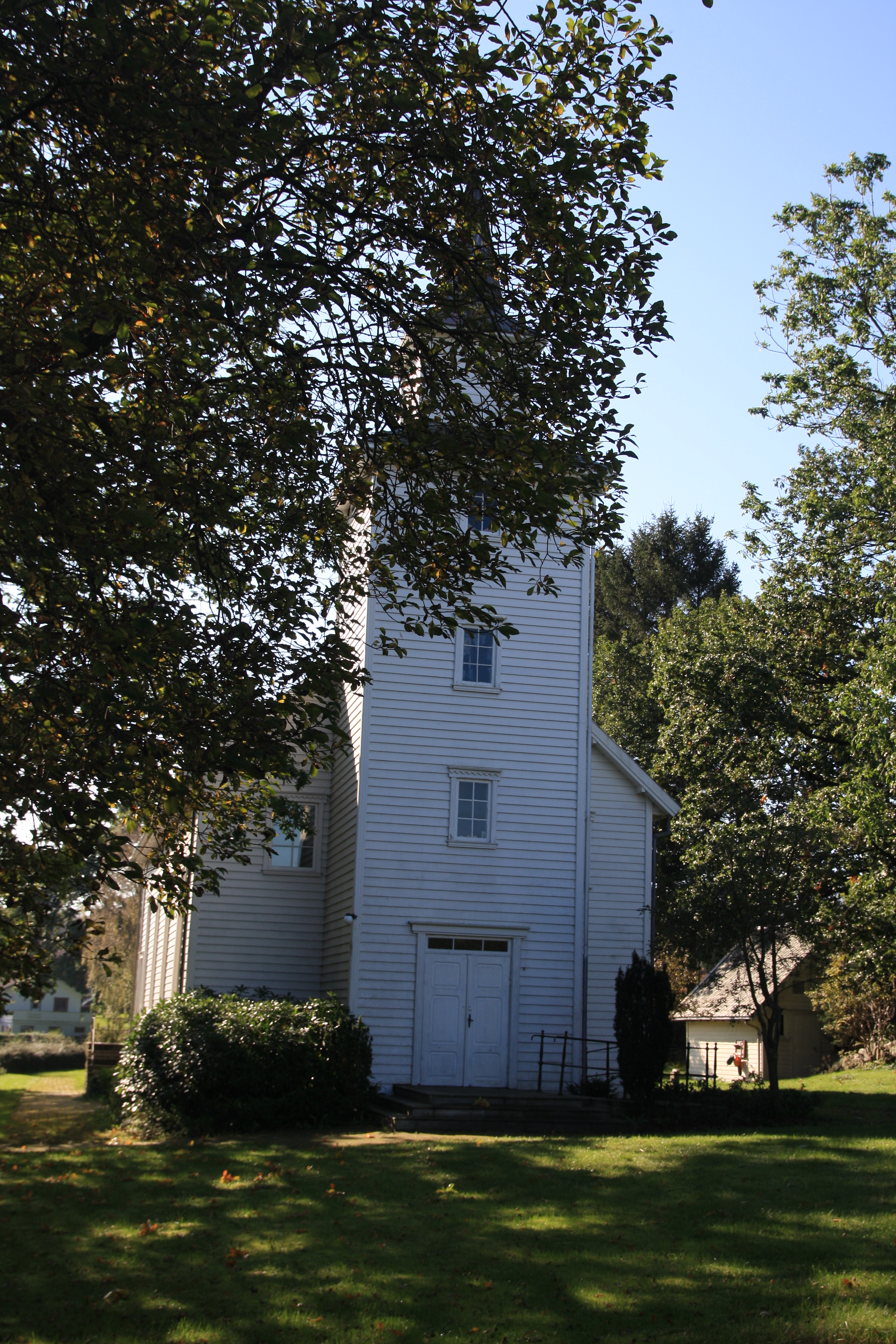

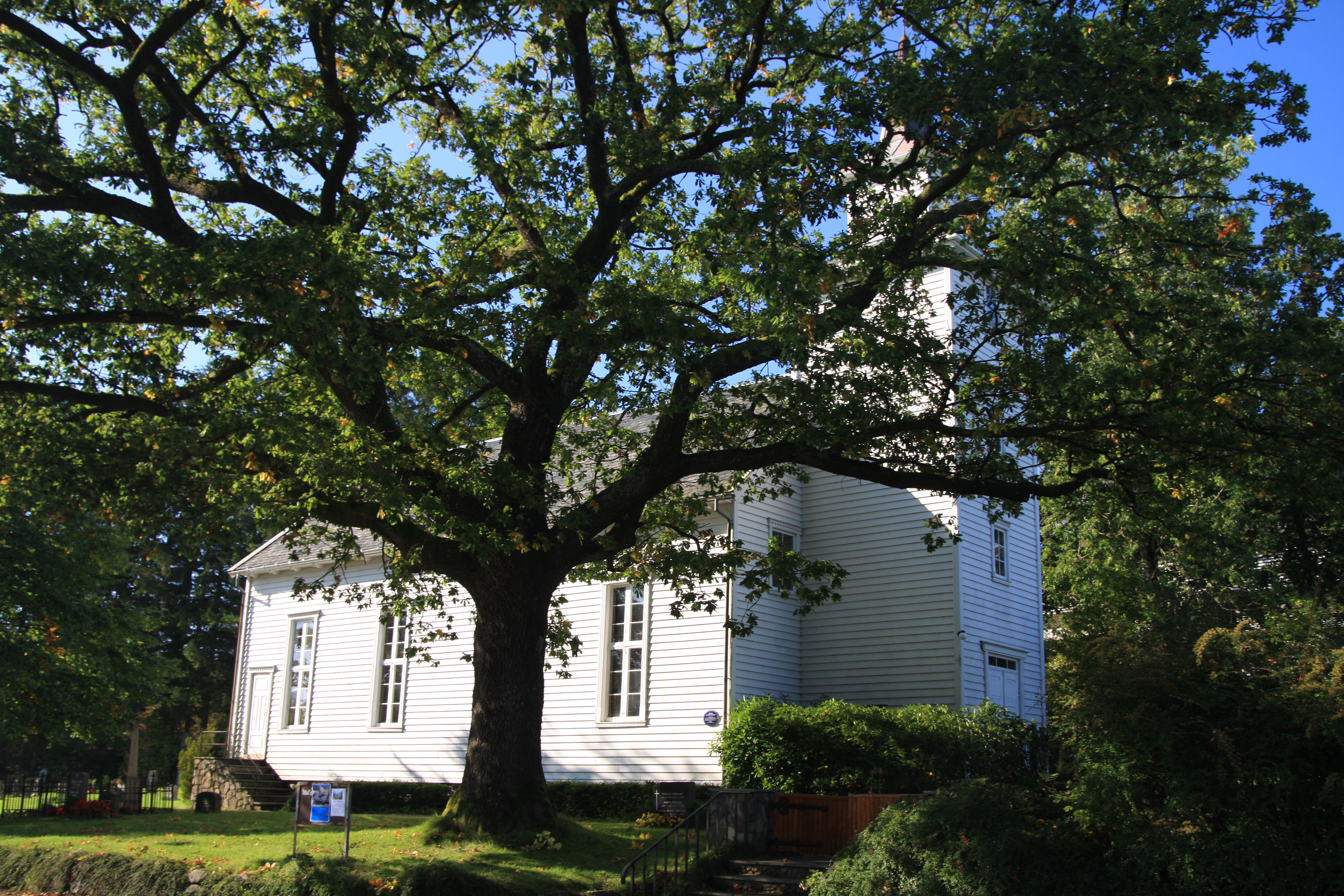

== See also ==
- List of churches in Rogaland
