= Hellesøy, Stavanger =

Island in Stavanger, Norway

Hellesøy
- Interactive map of the island

Geography
- Location: Rogaland, Norway
- Coordinates: 58.98433°N 5.82611°E
- Area: 0.41 km^{2} (0.16 sq mi)
- Length: 900 m (3000 ft)
- Width: 700 m (2300 ft)
- Coastline: 2.6 km (1.62 mi)
- Highest elevation: 42 m (138 ft)

Administration
- Norway
- County: Rogaland
- Municipality: Stavanger Municipality

Hellesøy is an island in Stavanger Municipality in Rogaland county, Norway. The 0.41-square-kilometre (100-acre) island lies in an archipelago at the mouths of the Gandsfjorden and Høgsfjorden, about 4.5 kilometres (2.8 mi) east of the centre of the city of Stavanger. The island lies close between the islands of Lindøy and Kalvøy and together, the three islands form a "neighborhood" within the city of Stavanger. In 2016, the three islands had a total combined population of 26. The island is only accessible by boat.

== See also ==
- List of islands of Norway
