= Forus =

Industrial district of Stavanger, Norway

Coordinates: 58°53′N 5°44′E

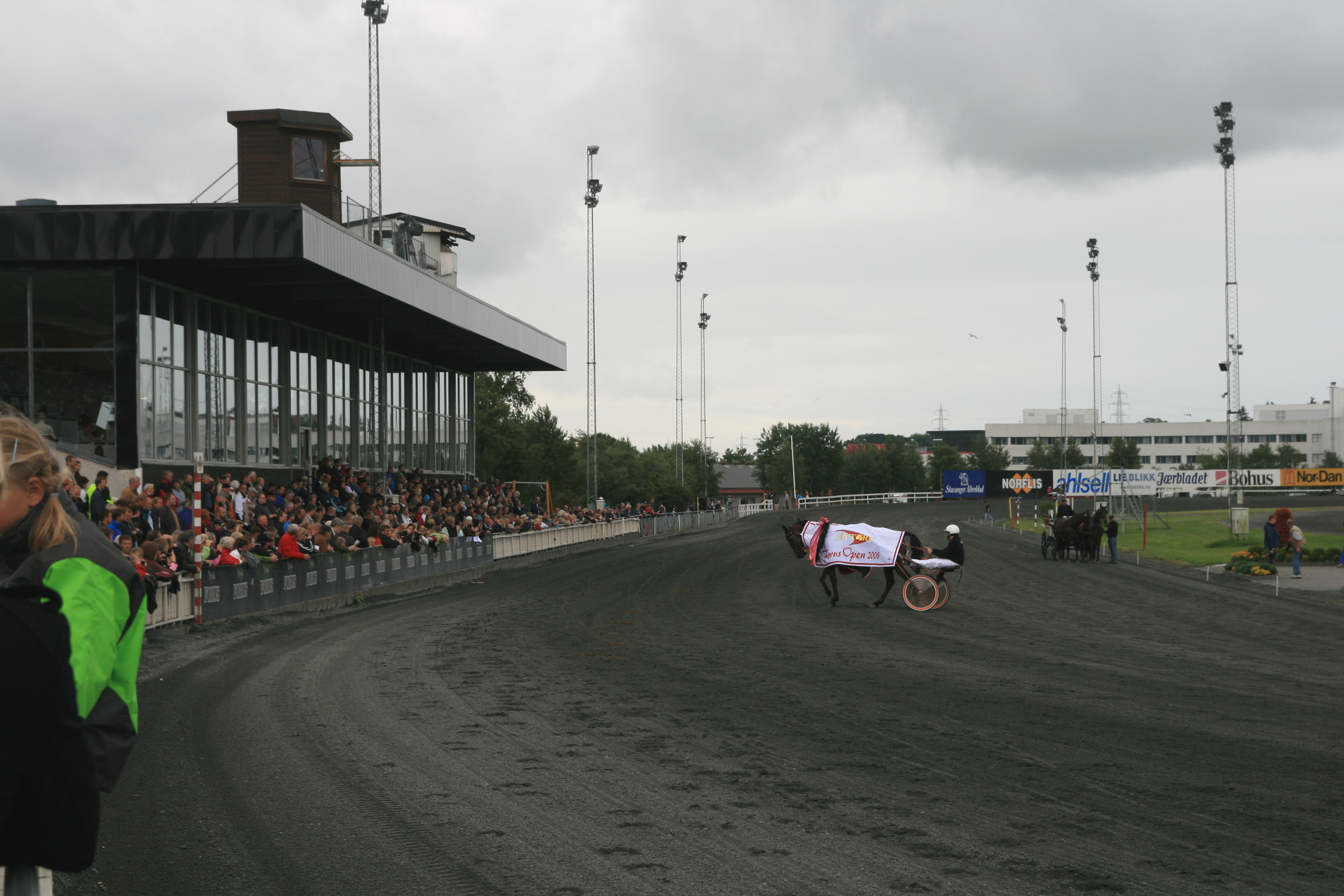
Forus Travbane

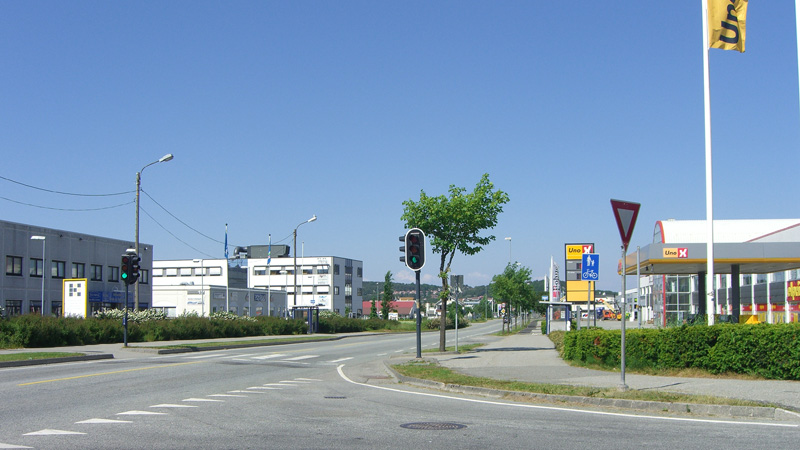
Forussletta

Forus is an industrial district in the city of Stavanger which lies in the southwestern part of the large Stavanger Municipality in Rogaland county, Norway. It is located in the borough of Hinna, along the Gandsfjorden, and it stretches south and west to the border with Sandnes Municipality and Sola Municipality. The name Forus originates from an old farm located in this area, part of which is currently used for harness racing.

The drainage of the former 4-square-kilometre (1.5 sq mi) lake Stokkavatnet and the surrounding marsh area, from 1906 and onwards, added 4.5 square kilometres (1.7 sq mi) of new land for the nearby farms. In 1940, at the start of World War II, the German occupants initiated construction of Stavanger Airport on this site. The area was later developed mainly for industrial purposes. The Equinor headquarters are located at Forus.
