= Jåtten =

Neighborhood of Stavanger, Norway

Coordinates: 58°54′56″N 5°43′36″E

Jåtten or Jåttå is a neighborhood (delområde) in the city of Stavanger which lies in the southwestern part of the large municipality of Stavanger in Rogaland county, Norway. It is located in the borough Hinna, just north of Godeset and Gausel. The neighborhood has a population of 13,760, distributed over an area of 12.58 square kilometres (4.86 sq mi). The Jåttåknuten hill lies at the southern part of the neighborhood. Jåttå Upper Secondary School is located here too.
