= Lindøy =

Island in Stavanger, Norway

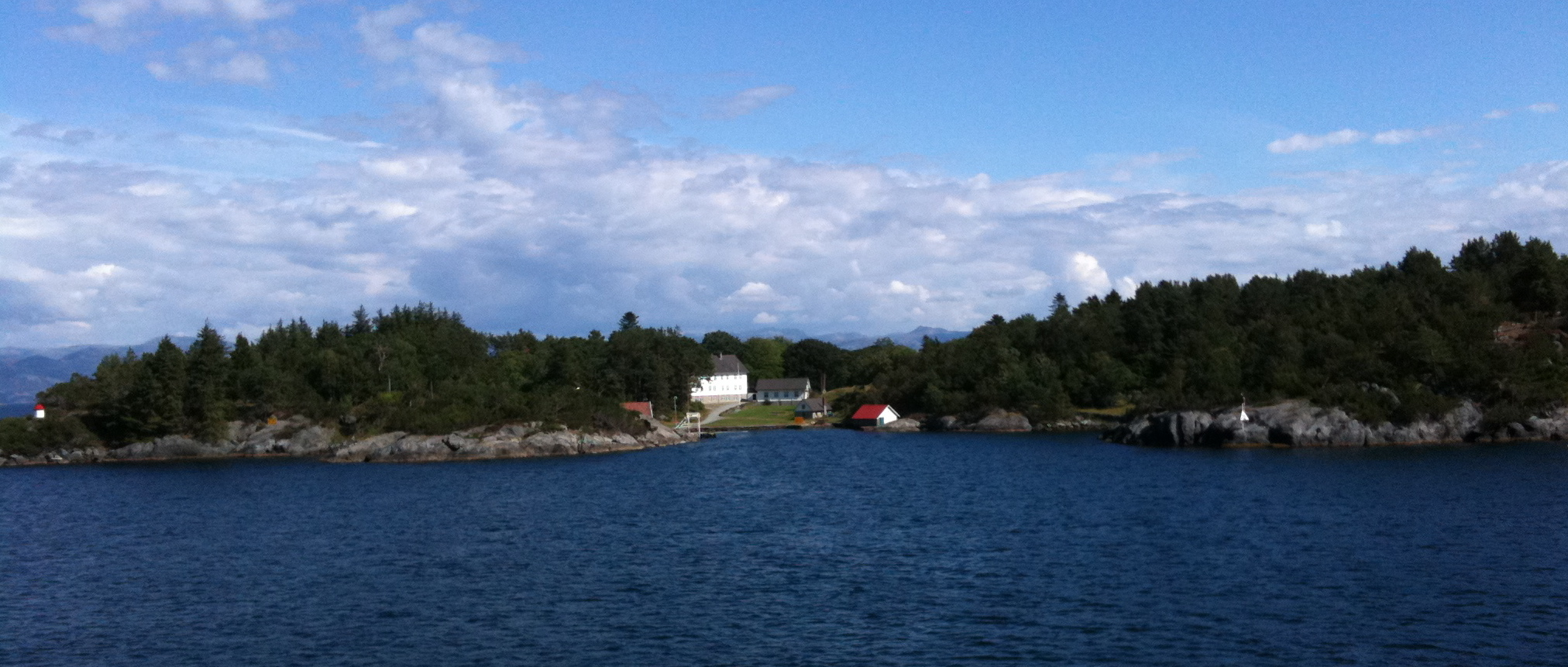
- View of Lindøy island
- Interactive map of the island

Geography
- Location: Rogaland, Norway
- Coordinates: 58.99071°N 5.80924°E
- Area: 28 ha (69 acres)
- Length: 800 m (2600 ft)
- Width: 750 m (2460 ft)
- Highest elevation: 21 m (69 ft)

Administration
- Norway
- County: Rogaland
- Municipality: Stavanger Municipality

Lindøy is an island in the Byfjorden in Stavanger Municipality in Rogaland county, Norway. The 280-decare (69-acre) island lies about 4 kilometres (2.5 mi) northeast of the centre of the city of Stavanger. It sits in an archipelago surrounded by the islands of Vassøy, Hellesøy, and Kalvøy. All of those islands are connected to the mainland only by boat.

== Orphanage ==
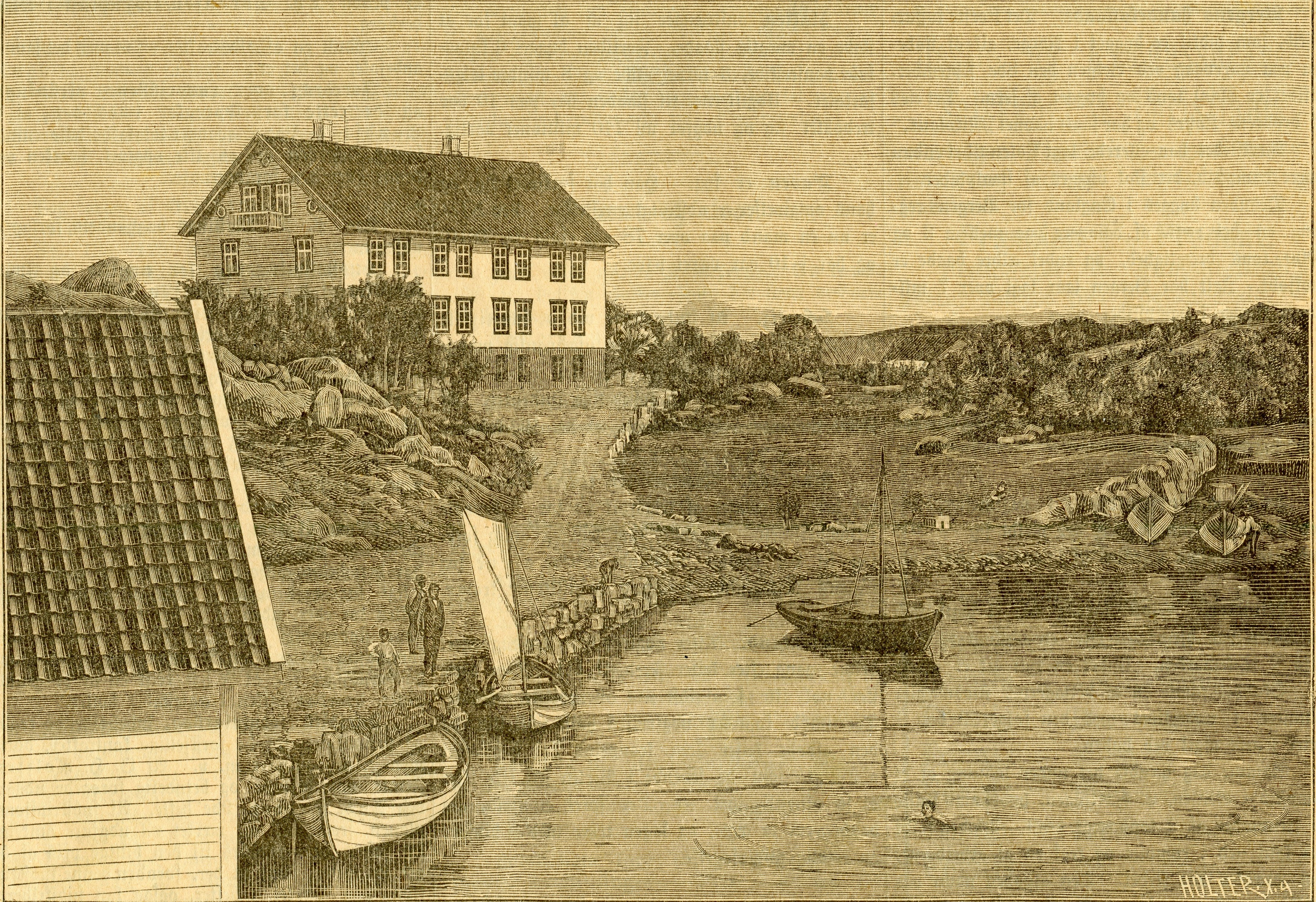
Lindøy Redningshjem, 1888

The island was used as an orphanage for more than a hundred years, established by Lars Oftedal in the late 1800s. A local adage in Stavanger was that parents would tell their boisterous children to "beware, otherwise I will send to Lindøy!" The reason for the institution of Lindøy was priest and politician Lars Oftedal bought the 280-deciare (0.69-acre) large island in 1887. The following year opened the so-called Redningshjem og Oppdragelsesanstalt ("Rescue Home and Educational Institution") which had space for 30 "perverse and depraved boys." This was not uncommon in Norway to open such institutions on isolated islands around the country, such as Bastøy and Ulvsnesøy. Originally, the island was used by the Waisenhuset orphanage in Stavanger and it was specifically for boys who were unfit to live there in the city.

In 1896, the Storting passed the Child Welfare Act and this introduced the concept of a school. In 1900, the island was bought by the municipality and starting in 1907 there were two institutions on the island: the boarding school "Hope" on the north side in Nordvik and forced school "coercion" in Sørvik. "Hope" was the oldest, and would prove to be the longest running. To be sent to "coercion" was often caused by frequent truancy, while it was worse cases that were sent to "hope." This boarding school had room for 30 boys, while "coercion" had up to 12, and these businesses existed together until 1946.

Guardian councils were abolished by the new Child Welfare Act of 1953 and these were replaced by child welfare Commissions. A boarding school home was then renamed as a "special school". The child welfare laws were revised again in 1995 and since then, Lindøy has been purely a home for residential care for youths 18 and younger. The center was planned shut down in 2010, but the decision was changed and the institution currently serves up to 6 youths.

== See also ==
- List of islands of Norway
