= Bjørnøy, Stavanger =

Island in Stavanger, Norway

Bjørnøy
- Interactive map of the island

Geography
- Location: Rogaland, Norway
- Coordinates: 58.99732°N 5.75708°E
- Area: 0.13 km^{2} (0.050 sq mi)
- Length: 610 m (2000 ft)
- Width: 350 m (1150 ft)

Administration
- Norway
- County: Rogaland
- Municipality: Stavanger Municipality

Bjørnøy is a small island in Stavanger Municipality in Rogaland county, Norway. The island is located in the borough of Hundvåg in the city of Stavanger. It is connected by bridge to the island of Hundvåg to the east (which in turn is connected to the mainland city of Stavanger), and it is also connected to the small islands of Roaldsøy and Ormøy to the south. The island is heavily populated and is covered with houses, although there are still a few larger green spaces left undeveloped.

== See also ==
- List of islands of Norway
