= Vassøy =

Island in Stavanger, Norway

- Interactive map of the island

Geography
- Location: Rogaland, Norway
- Coordinates: 58.9975°N 5.78581°E
- Area: 0.73 km^{2} (0.28 sq mi)
- Length: 1.8 km (1.12 mi)
- Width: 700 m (2300 ft)
- Highest elevation: 21 m (69 ft)

Administration
- Norway
- County: Rogaland
- Municipality: Stavanger Municipality

Demographics
- Population: 702 (2016)

Vassøy is an island in Stavanger Municipality in Rogaland county, Norway. The 0.73-square-kilometre (180-acre) island lies in the Storhaug borough, about 3.5 kilometres (2.2 mi) northeast of the centre of the city of Stavanger in an archipelago. The islands of Roaldsøy, Bjørnøy, and Langøy lie to the west and the island of Lindøy lies to the southeast. Vassøy had 702 inhabitants (in 2016) who all live along the western shore of the island; the eastern side is more rugged and wooded. The island has a primary school with around 60 pupils.

The only access to the island is by private boats or the regular ferry route administered by Kolumbus that goes from Vassøy to the city centre. A bridge or tunnel connecting Vassøy to either Bjørnøy or Roaldsøy has been heavily debated, but a conclusion has not been set. Kolumbus has said that if this were to finish construction, then they will cease to continue their services available to the Vassøy population like they have already to other islands who have gotten bridges.

== See also ==
- List of islands of Norway
