= Gandsfjord =

Fjord in Rogaland, Norway

Gandsfjorden
- Gandafjorden / Gansfjorden
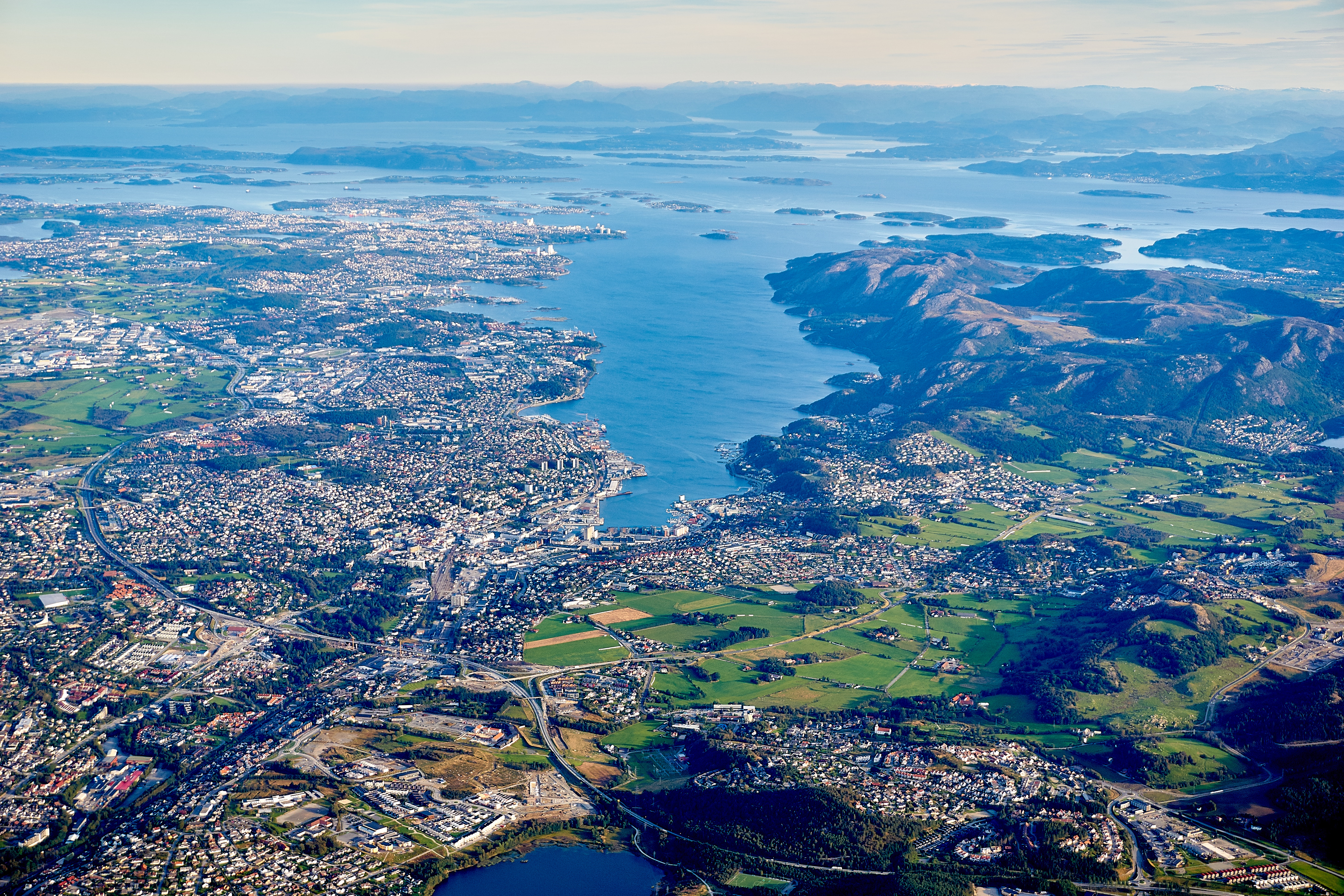
- Aerial view of the fjord
- Interactive map of the fjord
- Location: Rogaland county, Norway
- Coordinates: 58.89022°N 5.76300°E
- Type: Fjord
- Primary outflows: Boknafjorden
- Basin countries: Norway
- Max. length: 13 kilometres (8.1 mi)
- Settlements: Sandnes, Stavanger

Gandsfjorden is a fjord in Rogaland county, Norway. The 13-kilometre (8.1 mi) long Gandsfjorden is an arm off of the large Boknafjorden. It runs between the mainland and the Stavanger Peninsula in the western parts of Stavanger Municipality and Sandnes Municipality. The entire west and south side of the Gandsfjorden is highly developed and urban as this is the location of the cities of Stavanger and Sandnes. Stavanger/Sandnes is the third largest urban area in Norway. The east side of the fjord is far less developed and it has many mountains and peaks. In the outer parts of the fjord there are several islands including Uskjo, Hundvåg, Vassøy, and the Øyane islands of Stavanger.

== See also ==
- List of Norwegian fjords
