= Hundvåg =

Hundvåg may refer to:

== Places ==
- Hundvåg, Stavanger, a borough in the city of Stavanger in Rogaland county, Norway
- Hundvåg (island), an island in the city of Stavanger in Rogaland county, Norway
- Hundvåg Church, a church in the city of Stavanger in Rogaland county, Norway
- Hundvåg Tunnel, a subsea tunnel in Rogaland county, Norway

== Other ==
- Hundvåg FK, an association football club in the borough in the city of Stavanger in Rogaland county, Norway
