= Tasta (disambiguation) =

Tasta is a borough of the city of Stavanger in Rogaland county, Norway.

It may also refer to:

- Tasta Church, a parish church in Stavanger municipality in Rogaland county, Norway
- Tasta IL or Tasta Idrettslag, a Norwegian association football club from Tasta, Stavanger, Rogaland

== See also ==
- Indre Tasta, a neighborhood (delområde) in the city of Stavanger in Rogaland county, Norway
- Ytre Tasta, a neighborhood (delområde) in the city of Stavanger in Rogaland county, Norway
