= Stokka =

Stokka may refer to:

- Stokka, Alstahaug, a village in Alstahaug municipality, Nordland county, Norway
  - Sandnessjøen Airport or Sandnessjøen-Stokka, an airport in Alstahaug, Norway serving the city of Sandnessjøen
- Stokka, Karmøy, a village in Karmøy municipality, Rogaland county, Norway
- Stokka, Sandnes, a neighborhood in the city of Sandnes, Rogaland county, Norway
- Stokka, Stavanger, a neighborhood in the city of Stavanger, Rogaland county, Norway
  - Stokka Church, a church in the city of Stavanger, Rogaland county, Norway
- Stokka, Vevelstad, a village in Vevelstad municipality, Nordland county, Norway

== See also ==
- Stokke (disambiguation)
