= Byfjorden (Rogaland) =

Fjord in Rogaland, Norway

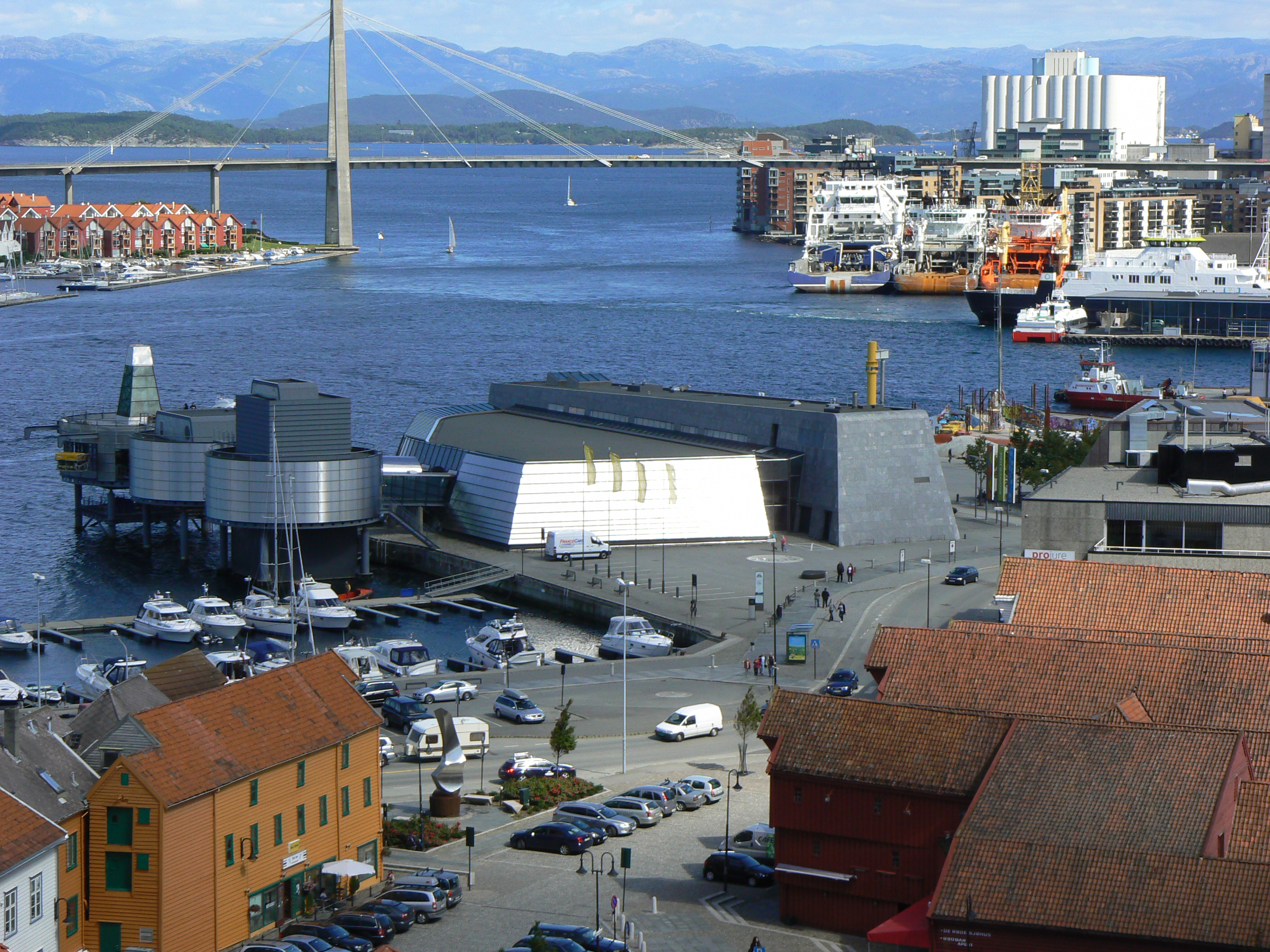
- View of the southern end of the fjord
- Interactive map of the fjord
- Location: Rogaland county, Norway
- Coordinates: 58.9964°N 5.6931°E
- Type: Fjord
- Primary outflows: Boknafjorden
- Basin countries: Norway
- Max. length: 10 kilometres (6.2 mi)
- Settlements: Stavanger

Byfjorden is a fjord in Rogaland county, Norway. The 10-kilometre (6.2 mi) long fjord runs through Randaberg Municipality and Stavanger Municipality. The fjord begins at the Tungenes Lighthouse at the northern end of the Stavanger Peninsula and it flows south along the east side of the peninsula to the city of Stavanger. The islands of Bru, Åmøy, Hundvåg, Buøy, Engøy, Sølyst, and Grasholmen lie along the east side of the fjord. The fjord connects to the Boknafjorden at the north end.

The fjord is crossed by three roads. The Stavanger City Bridge and the Hundvåg Tunnel (both at the south end of the fjord) and the Byfjord Tunnel (at the northern end of the fjord).

== See also ==
- List of Norwegian fjords
