= Trolleybuses in Stavanger =

Trolleybus network in Norway

Stavanger trolleybus

Overview
- Locale: Stavanger, Norway
- Transit type: Trolleybus
- Number of lines: 2

Operation
- Began operation: 26 October 1947
- Ended operation: 11 January 1963
- Operator: Stavanger Buss-Selskap

The Stavanger trolleybus system was the shortest trolleybus network in Norway, in both route length and time span. The system was opened on 26 October 1947 and closed on 11 January 1963. It was operated by Stavanger Buss-Selskap.

== History ==
The first plans for public transport in Stavanger was launched in 1916 with plans for a tramway. Permission was given, and track and wires were bought, but in the end there wasn't enough money to build the system. In 1933 a plan for trolleybuses was made for Stavanger, in combination with diesel buses. But things came in the way, and it was not until after the end of World War II that the system was constructed. In 1947 the first line, Line 1, was opened from the city square to Hillevåg, a 3 km stretch. The line was equipped with wires in both directions, but a 2 km line to the depot was only equipped with one wire. On 26 June 1949 the system was supplemented with Line 2 that went between the city square and Våland, as a partial circle line. During the 1950s there were serious plans for a Line 3 to Tasta. Line 1 operated at a 10-minute headway while Line 2 had a 20-minute headway.

The system was closed in the 1960s due to a new route policy of driving the buses through the city, a system that did not work well with the existing trolleybuses. Line 2 was closed in 1962 and on 11 January 1963 the last trolleybus was driven in Stavanger. The route change was originally to take place on 17 February but a national strike that lasted until 9 February resulted in trolley buses being taken out of service early. None of the five trolleybuses from Stavanger have been preserved.

It was announced in 2015 that a new trolleybus system was planned to be built in the city, opening in 2021. However, the plans were dropped in 2017.
