= Ryfast =

Sub-sea tunnel system in Rogaland county, Norway

Coordinates: 59°01′53″N 5°48′54″E

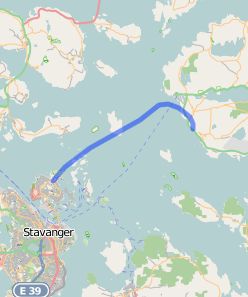
The Ryfylke tunnel

Ryfast is a subsea tunnel system in Rogaland county, Norway. The tunnel system is part of the Norwegian National Road 13, and it runs between the city of Stavanger in Stavanger Municipality, under a large fjord, and ends at Solbakk in Strand Municipality.

When the last section was drilled on 26 October 2017, Ryfast became the longest undersea road tunnel in the world, with its 14.3-kilometre (8.9 mi) length greater than the Eysturoyartunnilin and Sandoyartunnilin in the Faroe Islands at 11.2 kilometres (7.0 mi) and 10.8 kilometres (6.7 mi) respectively, the Tokyo Bay Tunnel in Japan at 9.6 kilometres (6.0 mi), and the Shanghai Yangtze River Tunnel at nine kilometres (5.6 mi) in China. It is also currently the world's deepest subsea tunnel, reaching a maximum depth of 292 metres (958 ft) below sea level.

The project was approved by the Norwegian Parliament on 12 June 2012, and construction began in the spring of 2013. The cost of Ryfast is estimated to 5.22 billion kr (Norwegian krone). The tunnel system replaced the ferry route between Stavanger and Tau. A large part of the cost is paid by road tolls. There are as of 2022 separate tolls for the Ryfylke Tunnel and for Hundvåg Tunnel, costing 179 NOK (17,45 euros) for a car without special agreement to pass both as of 2022.

The tunnel system consists of two subsea tunnels:

- Ryfylke Tunnel, 14,400 metres (47,200 ft), running from the island of Hundvåg to just south of the village of Tau in Strand municipality on the other side of the fjord. This tunnel reduced travel time between the Northern Jæren and Ryfylke districts in Rogaland county.
  - Ryfylke officially opened to traffic at noon on 30 December 2019.
- Hundvåg Tunnel, 5,500 metres (18,000 ft), running from the city of Stavanger to the island of Hundvåg, with a connection to the smaller island of Buøy. This tunnel relieved congestion on the Stavanger City Bridge.
  - While the first section of Hundvåg was opened for a celebration in December 2019, the official opening for vehicles was delayed to 22 April 2020 due to extra technical testing, which was slowed due to the impact of the COVID-19 pandemic in Norway.

The Ryfast tunnel system was built at the same time as the 3,700-metre (12,100 ft) Eiganes Tunnel, which was constructed from a similar starting point as the Hundvåg, under the city of Stavanger, but stays in (under) the city rather than continuing undersea. The Eiganes tunnel, like the Hundvåg tunnel, opened on 22 April 2020.
