= Engøy =

Island in Stavanger, Norway

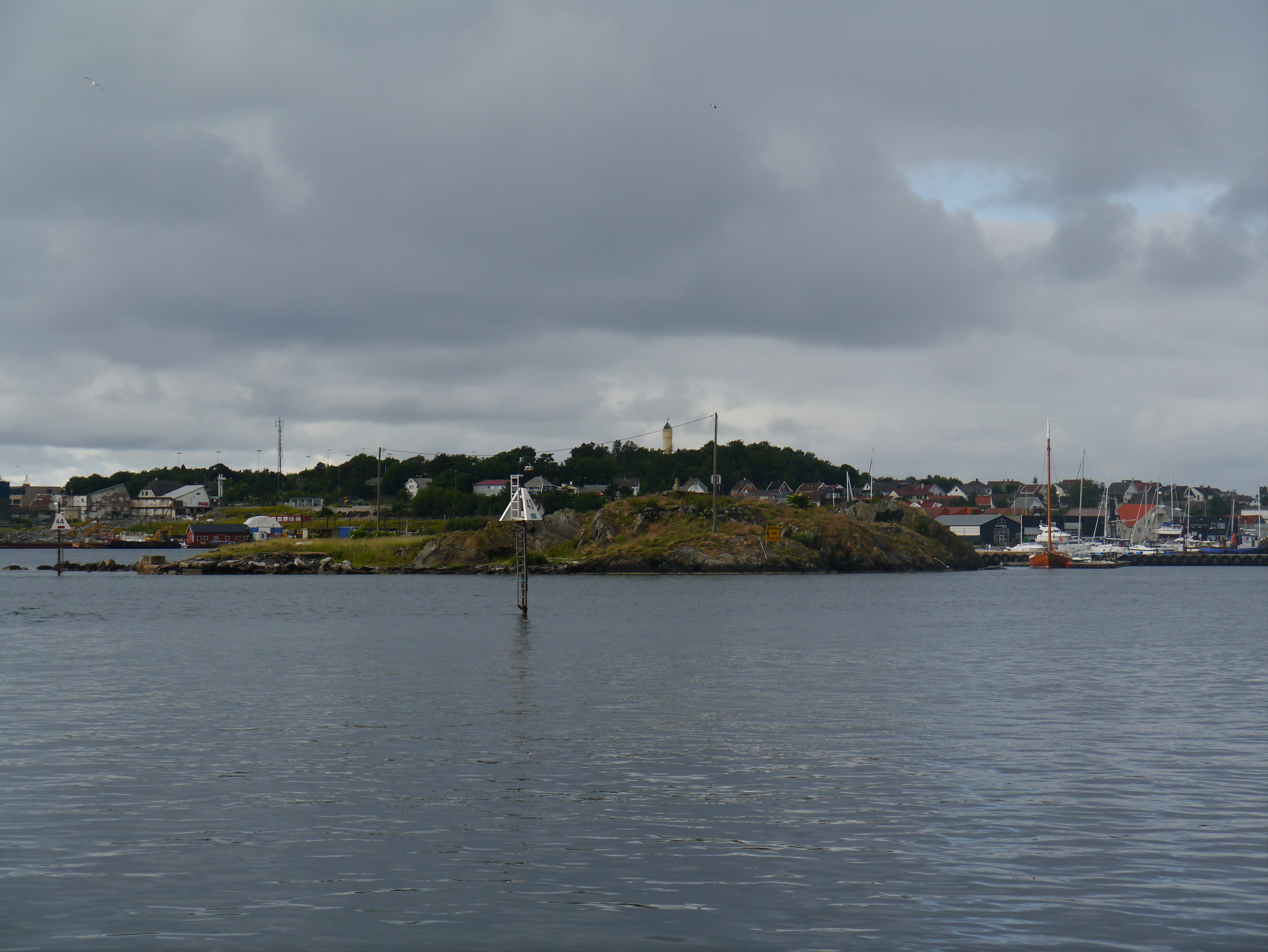
- View of Engøy with Buøy in the background.
- Interactive map of the island

Geography
- Location: Rogaland, Norway
- Coordinates: 58.98291°N 5.74399°E
- Area: 14 ha (35 acres)
- Length: 920 m (3020 ft)
- Width: 360 m (1180 ft)

Administration
- Norway
- County: Rogaland
- Municipality: Stavanger Municipality

Demographics
- Population: 431 (2022)

Engøy is an island in Stavanger Municipality in Rogaland county, Norway. It is located in the "neighborhood" of Buøy in the borough Hundvåg in the city of Stavanger, just north of the city centre. The island is almost completely urbanized with many houses on the east side and a lot of industry on the west side. There were 431 residents on the island in 2022.

The 14-hectare (35-acre) island is connected to mainland of Stavanger via the Engøy Bridge, which connects Engøy to the islands Sølyst and Grasholmen, and by the Stavanger City Bridge which connects Sølyst and Grasholmen to the mainland.

== History ==
Engøy was part of the old Hetland Municipality until 1 January 1879 when it was transferred to the city of Stavanger.

== See also ==
- List of islands of Norway
