= Hundvåg (island) =

Island in Stavanger, Norway

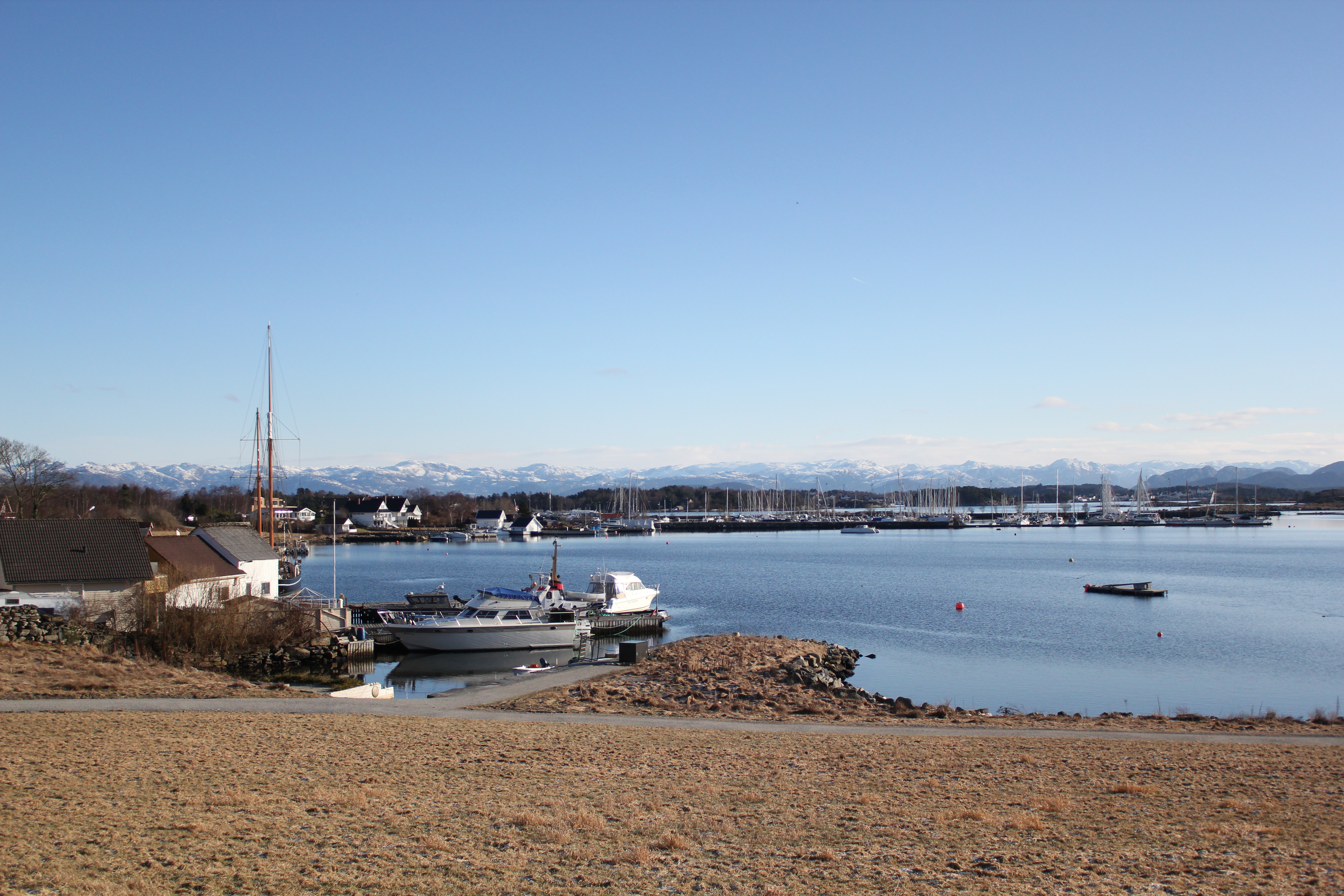
- View of Hundvåg
- Interactive map of the island

Geography
- Location: Rogaland, Norway
- Coordinates: 59.00167°N 5.73179°E
- Area: 4.7 km^{2} (1.8 sq mi)
- Length: 2.7 km (1.68 mi)
- Width: 2.7 km (1.68 mi)

Administration
- Norway
- County: Rogaland
- Municipality: Stavanger Municipality

Demographics
- Population: 10943 (2021)

Hundvåg is an island in Stavanger Municipality in Rogaland county, Norway. The island is located in the borough of Hundvåg, just north of the centre of the city of Stavanger, separated by the Byfjorden. The 4.7-square-kilometre (1.8 sq mi) island is relatively flat and very urbanized. There were 10,943 residents of the island in 2021. There are some agricultural areas as well as a lot of industry. The small island of Buøy is connected to the south side of Hundvåg by a small man-made isthmus. Hundvåg Church is located on the island.

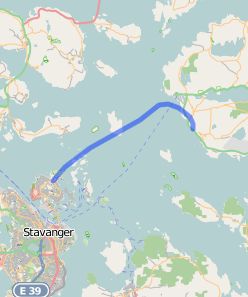
Route of Ryfast subsea tunnel network

== Transportation ==
Hundvåg is connected to the mainland by a series of bridges connecting the islands of Buøy to Engøy to Sølyst to Grasholmen and then over the Stavanger City Bridge to the mainland of the city. The Hundvåg Tunnel goes under the sea and islands from the mainland of Stavanger to the northern part of Hundvåg island. The Ryfast subsea tunnel continues with the Ryfylke Tunnel which goes from Hundvåg under the fjord to the east, connecting the island to Strand Municipality about 15 kilometres (9.3 mi) away.

== See also ==
- List of islands of Norway
