= Sølyst =

Sølyst may refer to:

- Sølyst (Klampenborg), an estate north of Copenhagen, Denmark
- Sølyst, Stavanger, an island in Stavanger, Norway
- Sølyst, the moniker of musician Thomas Klein of Kreidler
