= Tjensvoll =

Neighborhood in Stavanger, Norway

Coordinates: 58°57′01″N 5°41′57″E

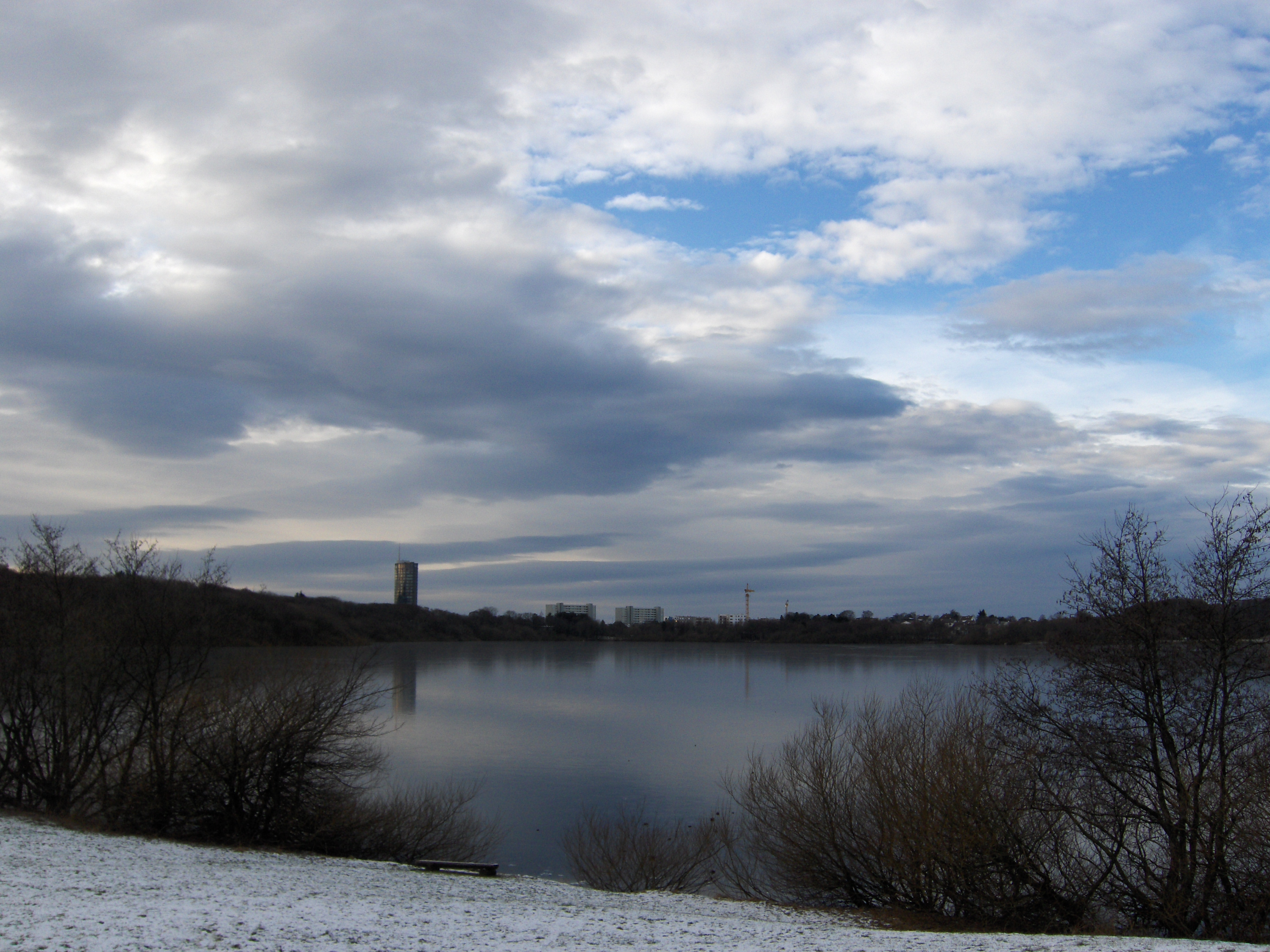
Mosvatnet, a lake near the neighborhood.

Tjensvoll is a neighborhood (delområde) in the city of Stavanger which lies in the southwestern part of the large municipality of Stavanger in Rogaland county, Norway. It is located in the borough of Hillevåg, southwest of the lake Mosvatnet. Until 1987, it was a borough of its own. The neighborhood has a population of 5,756 which is distributed over an area of 2.68 square kilometres (660 acres). Tjensvoll Church is located in this neighborhood.
