= Vardeneset Church =

Church in Rogaland, Norway

- Vardeneset kirke
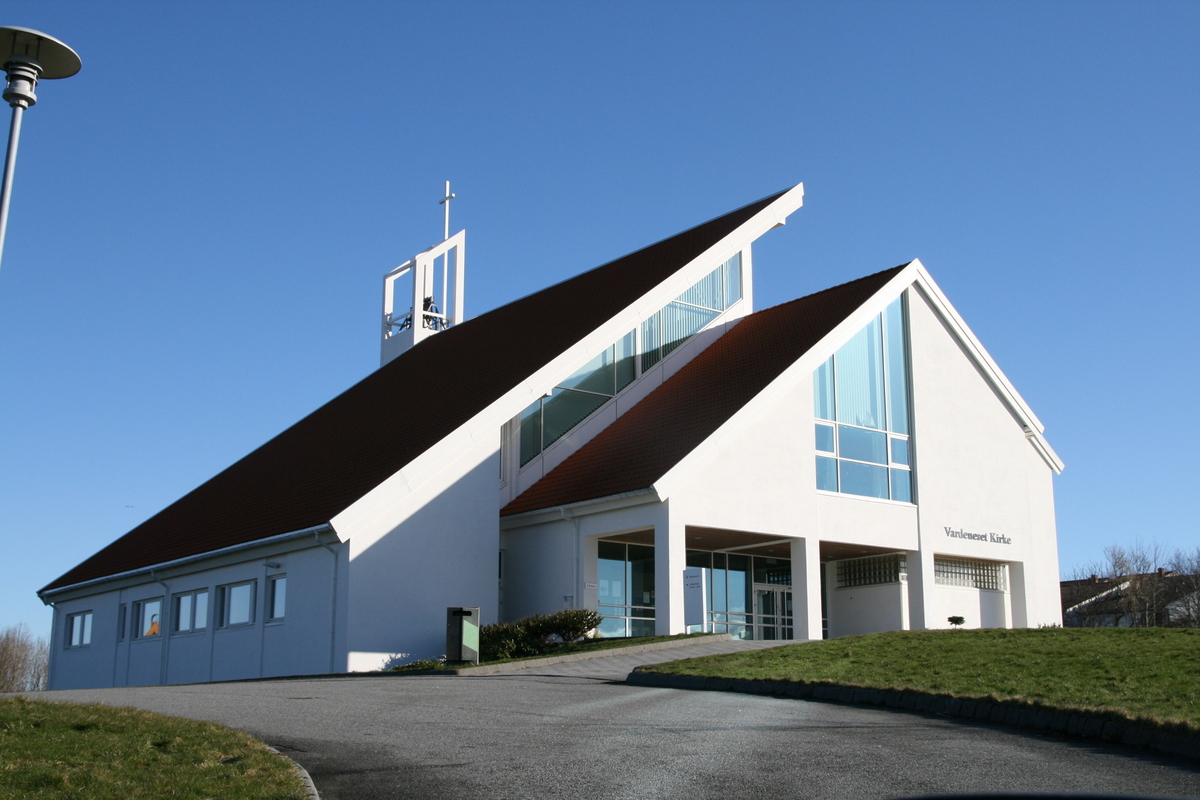
- View of the church
- Vardeneset Church
- 58.993439°N 05.67513°E
- Location: Stavanger Municipality, Rogaland
- Country: Norway
- Denomination: Church of Norway
- Churchmanship: Evangelical Lutheran

History
- Status: Parish church
- Founded: 2000
- Consecrated: 2 Jan 2000

Architecture
- Functional status: Active
- Architect: Steinar Skartveit
- Architectural type: Rectangular
- Completed: 2000

Specifications
- Capacity: 450
- Materials: Expanded clay aggregate

Administration
- Diocese: Stavanger bispedømme
- Deanery: Ytre Stavanger prosti
- Parish: Vardeneset

Vardeneset Church (Norwegian: Vardeneset kirke) is a parish church of the Church of Norway in the southern part of the large Stavanger Municipality in Rogaland county, Norway. It is located in the Ytre Tasta neighborhood in the borough of Tasta in the northern part of the city of Stavanger. It is the church for the Vardeneset parish which is part of the Ytre Stavanger prosti (deanery) in the Diocese of Stavanger. The expanded clay aggregate church was built in a rectangular design in 18 using designs by the architect Steinar Skartveit. The church seats about 450 people.

The church was consecrated on 2 January 2000 by the Bishop Ernst Oddvar Baasland.

== See also ==
- List of churches in Rogaland
