= Nordic Office of Architecture =

Nordic Office of Architecture is a Norwegian architecture and masterplanning practice specialising in complex projects such as airports and hospitals.

The practice employs around 400 people located in offices in Oslo, Copenhagen, Aarhus, Aalborg.

== History ==
Since 1991 Nordic Office of Architecture has been involved in the design and planning of Oslo Airport, following the decision that the main airport would move to Gardermoen from its previous location at Fornebu. The airport opened in 1998, and Nordic has been involved in the continuous improvement works and the current vast expansion, including a new pier, as part of Team_T. Team_T is a collaboration between Nordic Office of Architecture, COWI, Norconsult, Aas-Jakobsen and Per Rasmussen AS.

In 2014, Nordic Office of Architecture, Grimshaw Architects and Haptic Architects were assigned by the consortium of Cengiz-Kolin-Limak-Mapa-Kalyon to design the world's largest airport at the time, Istanbul Airport, that opened in 2019.

Nordic Office of Architecture is the lead architect of the New Government Quarter in Oslo, part of Team URBIS, the project team consisting of Nordic Office of Architecture, Haptic Architects, Cowi, Aas-Jacobsen, Ingeniør Per Rasmussen, SLA landscape architects, Bjørbekk & Lindheim landscape architects, Asplan Viak, Scenario, NIKU, and Norsam.

Notable hospital projects include St. Olav's University Hospital which was completed in 2013. This vast project included six new clinical centres in central Trondheim, all built while the hospital was fully operational. The hospital has been well integrated in the city and has received awards for urban design, sustainable design and inclusive design. Awards include The 'Health Project Over 40000 Award' from the International Academy for Design & Health in 2014 and 'The Innovation Award for Inclusive Design' from The Norwegian Centre for Design and Architecture 2015.

Opening in 2025, Stavanger University Hospital offer a complete range of medical services, designed consistently with the users in mind. Autodesk named the project the world's best digital construction project.

The practice was founded as Narud Stokke Wiig Architects and Planners in 1979 but changed names in 2012.

== Notable works ==
- Government Quarter in Oslo
- Oslo Airport
- Istanbul Airport
- St. Olav's University Hospital
- Stavanger University Hospital
