= Breiavatnet =

Shallow lake in Stavanger, Norway

- Brede-vandet (historical)
- View of the lake in 2026
- Interactive map of Breiavatnet
- Location: Stavanger Municipality, Rogaland
- Coordinates: 58.96806°N 5.733°E
- Basin countries: Norway
- Max. length: 225 metres (738 ft)
- Max. width: 200 metres (660 ft)
- Surface area: 310 daa (77 acres)
- Shore length^{1}: 0.71 kilometres (0.44 mi)
- Surface elevation: 5 metres (16 ft)
- References: NVE
- ^{1} Shore length is not a well-defined measure.

Breiavatnet is a small lake in Stavanger Municipality in Rogaland county, Norway. The 310-decare (77-acre) lake is very shallow, only a few feet deep. The lake gets its water from the Kannikbekken stream, which flows from the lake Mosvatnet and runs through the city (the stream was put mostly underground in culverts and pipes in 1899). A decorative fountain was installed in the middle of the lake in 1924.

The lake lies in the city centre of Stavanger, on the border of the boroughs of Storhaug and Eiganes og Våland. The Stavanger Cathedral, the City Park, and Stavanger Cathedral School lie on the northern shore of the lake. The Stavanger train station is located on the south shore of the lake.

The lake is the home of various birds, such as swans, seagulls, ducks, and sparrows. There are scarcely any fish in the water, and an old story from the area says that only the principal of Stavanger Cathedral School is the only one with rights to go fishing in Breiavatnet.

== See also ==
- List of lakes in Norway
