= Rennesøy =

Rennesøy may refer to:

== Places ==
- Rennesøy, Stavanger, a borough in the large Stavanger Municipality in Rogaland county, Norway
- Rennesøy (island), an island in Stavanger Municipality in Rogaland county, Norway
- Rennesøy Municipality, a former municipality in Rogaland county, Norway
