= Tjensvoll Church =

Church in Rogaland, Norway

- Tjensvoll kirke
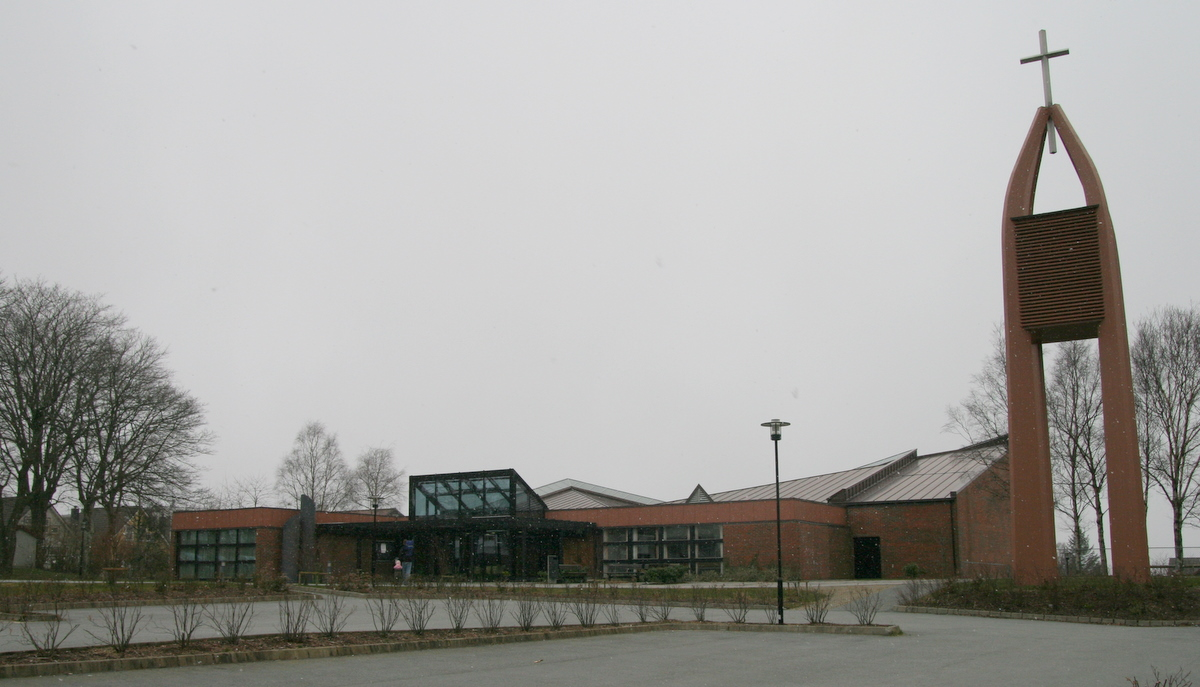
- View of the church
- Tjensvoll Church
- 58.950562°N 5.702304°E
- Location: Stavanger Municipality, Rogaland
- Country: Norway
- Denomination: Church of Norway
- Churchmanship: Evangelical Lutheran

History
- Status: Parish church
- Founded: 1978
- Consecrated: 1978

Architecture
- Functional status: Active
- Architect(s): Per Faltinsen and Inger-Lise Faltinsen
- Architectural type: Fan-shaped
- Completed: 1978 (48 years ago)

Specifications
- Capacity: 304
- Materials: Brick

Administration
- Diocese: Stavanger bispedømme
- Deanery: Stavanger domprosti
- Parish: Tjensvoll
- Norwegian Cultural Heritage Site
- Type: Church
- Status: Not protected
- ID: 85633

Tjensvoll Church (Norwegian: Tjensvoll kirke) is a parish church of the Church of Norway in Stavanger Municipality in Rogaland county, Norway. It is located in the Tjensvoll neighborhood in the borough of Hillevåg in the city of Stavanger. It is the church for the Tjensvoll parish which is part of the Stavanger domprosti (arch-deanery) in the Diocese of Stavanger. The red brick church was built in a fan-shaped design in 1978 using designs by the architects Per Faltinsen and Inger-Lise Faltinsen. The church seats about 300 people.

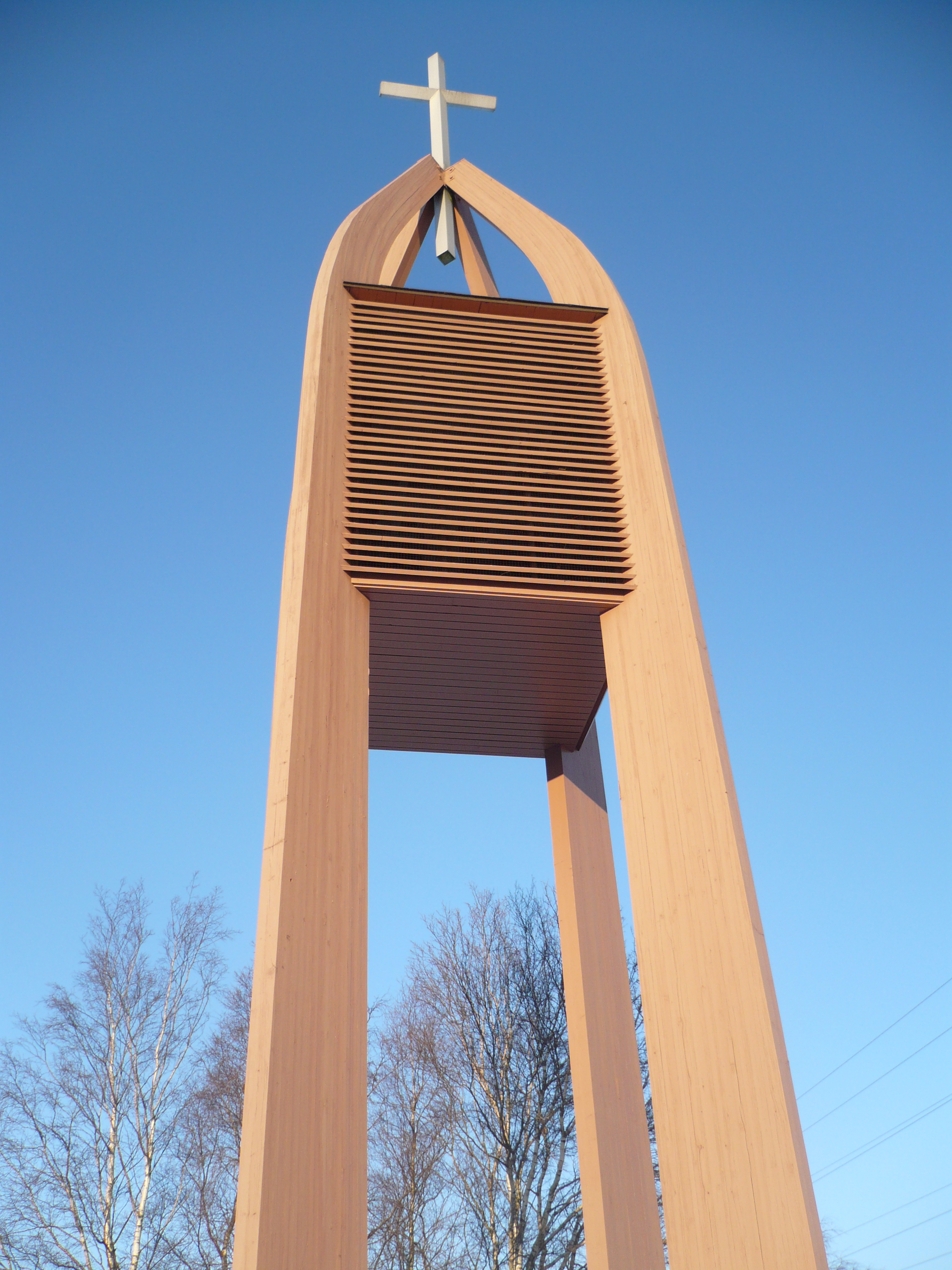
View of the bell tower

== See also ==
- List of churches in Rogaland
