= Indre Tasta =

Neighborhood of Stavanger, Norway

Coordinates: 58°58′55″N 05°41′44″E

Indre Tasta is a neighborhood (delområde) in the city of Stavanger which lies in the southwestern part of the large municipality of Stavanger in Rogaland county, Norway. It is located in the northern part of the mainland borough of Tasta. The Ytre Tasta neighborhood lies to the north, the Gandsfjorden lies to the east, the Stokkavatnet lake lies to the west, and the borough of Eiganes og Våland lies to the south. The neighborhood has a population of 4,833 which is distributed over an area of 1.62 square kilometres (0.63 sq mi). Tasta Church is located in this neighborhood.
