= Stokka, Stavanger =

Neighborhood in Stavanger, Norway

Coordinates: 58°57′52″N 05°41′51″E

Stokka is a neighborhood (delområde) in the city of Stavanger which lies in the southwestern part of the large municipality of Stavanger in Rogaland county, Norway. It is located in the borough of Eiganes og Våland. It is located between the European route E39 highway and the lake Stokkavatnet. The neighborhood has a population of 3,599 which is distributed over an area of 3.06 square kilometres (760 acres). Stokka Church is located in this neighborhood.

Grunnkretser i Stokka:

- Stokkabrautene
- Lassa
- Nedre Stokka
- Øvre Stokka
