= Stokke =

Stokke may refer to:

== Places ==
- Stokke (village), a village in Sandefjord Municipality in Vestfold county, Norway
- Stokke Municipality, a former municipality in Vestfold county, Norway
- Stokke Station, a railway station in the village of Stokke in Sandefjord Municipality in Vestfold county, Norway

== Other ==
- Stokke (surname)
- Stokke AS, a Norwegian children's furniture and accessories company
- Stokke IL, a Norwegian sports club based in Sandefjord Municipality in Vestfold county, Norway
