= Ryfylke Tunnel =

Underwater road tunnel in Norway

Coordinates: 59°01′53″N 5°48′54″E

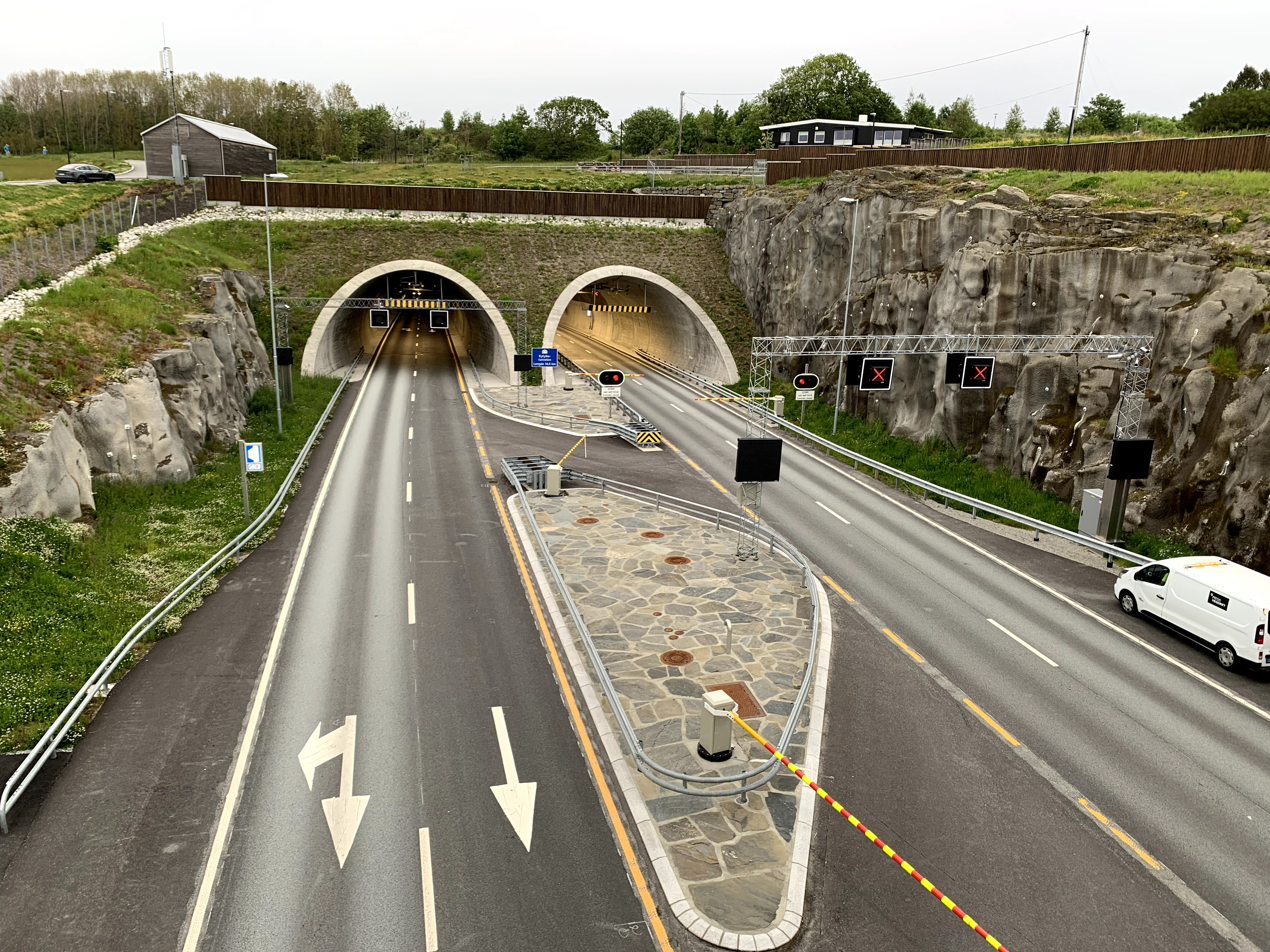
- Interactive map of Ryfylke Tunnel

Overview
- Other name: Solbakktunnelen
- Location: Rogaland, Norway
- Route: Norwegian National Road 13
- Crosses: Hidle island

Operation
- Constructed: 2013–19
- Opened: 30 December 2019
- Operator: Norwegian Public Roads Administration
- Traffic: Automotive
- Toll: 171 kr

Technical
- Length: 14.4 km
- Min elevation: -292 m

The Ryfylke Tunnel (Norwegian: Ryfylketunnelen) is an undersea road tunnel in Rogaland county, Norway. It is part of the Norwegian National Road 13 running between Stavanger and Ryfylke (district) under the Horgefjord (part of the Boknafjord). The tunnel is part of the Ryfast project. It is 14.4 kilometres (9 mi) long and is currently the world's longest subsea road tunnel, and the deepest tunnel of any kind. Both records are expected to be surpassed by Rogfast, which is projected to open in 2033.

The tunnel is designed for 10,000 vehicles per day and is built with one tube for each traffic-direction, and two vehicular lanes in each tube. The entrance on the Ryfylke side is located about one kilometre (one-half mile) north of Solbakk in Strand Municipality (just south of Tau). The entrance on the "city side" is on Hundvåg island in Stavanger Municipality. Construction began in 2013, and the tunnel opened on 30 December 2019. A half marathon was held in the tunnel on 5 October 2019.

== Toll charging ==
At the time of opening the tunnel had a toll of 140 kr (about $15) for vehicles in tariff group 1 (light vehicles) with a 20% discount for using an electronic toll tag. Zero-emission vehicles received a 50% discount. Tariff group 2 (large goods vehicles) incurred 420 kr (about $46).

From July 2022, the rates increased to 149 kr and 446 kr respectively, before discount.
