= Stavanger Hospital Trust =

Norwegian health trust

Stavanger Health Trust (Norwegian: Helse Stavanger) is a health trust which serves southern Rogaland. Its main facility is Stavanger University Hospital, as well as local clinics and institutions around Rogaland. The trust was formed on 1 January 2002 as a result of the national health reforms and is owned by Western Norway Regional Health Authority
