= Kampen Church, Stavanger =

Church in Rogaland, Norway

Kampen Church
- Kampen kirke
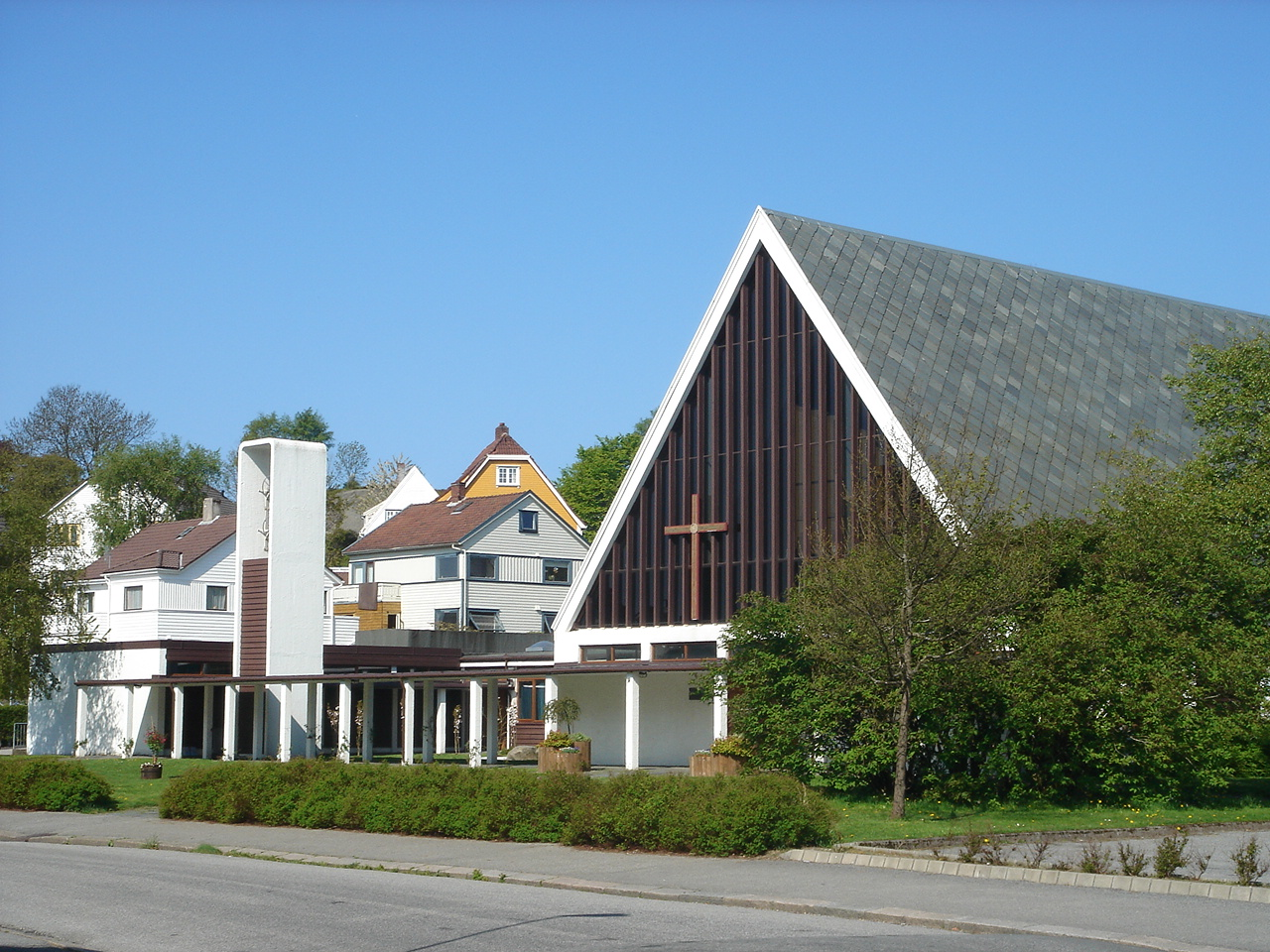
- View of the church
- Kampen Church
- 58.970987°N 5.7123899°E
- Location: Stavanger Municipality, Rogaland
- Country: Norway
- Denomination: Church of Norway
- Churchmanship: Evangelical Lutheran

History
- Status: Parish church
- Founded: 1957
- Consecrated: 1957

Architecture
- Functional status: Active
- Architect: T. Bryne
- Architectural type: Rectangular
- Completed: 1957

Specifications
- Capacity: 280
- Materials: Concrete

Administration
- Diocese: Stavanger bispedømme
- Deanery: Stavanger domprosti
- Parish: Kampen

Kampen Church (Norwegian: Kampen kirke) is a parish church of the Church of Norway in Stavanger Municipality in Rogaland county, Norway. It is located in the Kampen in the borough of Eiganes og Våland in the city of Stavanger. It is the church for the Kampen parish which is part of the Stavanger domprosti (arch-deanery) in the Diocese of Stavanger. The large, concrete church was built in a rectangular design in 1957 using designs by the architect T. Bryne. The church seats about 280 people.

== See also ==
- List of churches in Rogaland
