= Stavanger University Hospital =

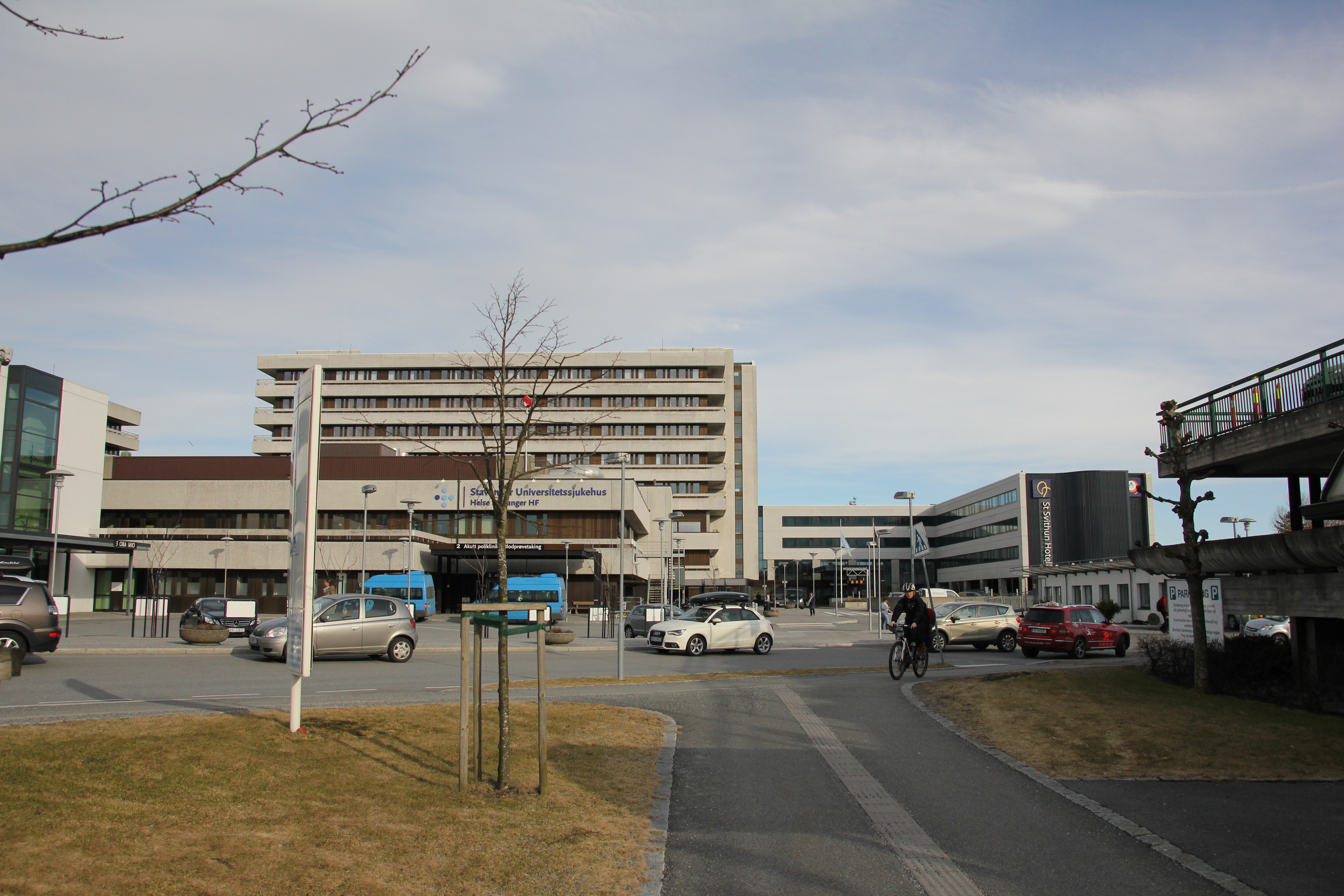
- Stavanger University Hospital

Geography
- Location: Våland, Stavanger, Rogaland county, Norway
- Coordinates: 58°57′10″N 5°44′0″E

Organisation
- Type: General
- Affiliated university: University of Bergen
- Network: Stavanger Hospital Trust

Links
- Website: helse-stavanger.no
- Lists: Hospitals in Norway

Stavanger University Hospital (Norwegian: Stavanger Universitetssjukehus, SUS) is located in the neighborhood of Våland in Stavanger, Norway. It is owned by the Stavanger Hospital Trust.

Stavanger University Hospital is one of Norway's largest hospitals with more than 7500 employees. The main hospital is situated in Stavanger, but it has several clinics and medical centers. SUS is the central hospital of Rogaland county, serving as the local hospital from Hjelmeland Municipality in the north to Sokndal Municipality in the south. The general service area of the hospital includes an estimated population of more than 330,000 people. SUS has an annual budget of approximately 5 billion kr.

Through cooperation with regional participants, SUS attempt to ensure that the research results with commercial potential reach the market. SUS cooperates with Stavanger Health Research (Stavanger Helseforskning) and Hjertelaget Research Foundation (Forskningsstiftelsen Hjertelaget) both of which both perform and administrate clinical research.
