= Hundvåg Tunnel =

Road underpass in Stavanger, Norway

Hundvåg Tunnel Hundvågtunnelen
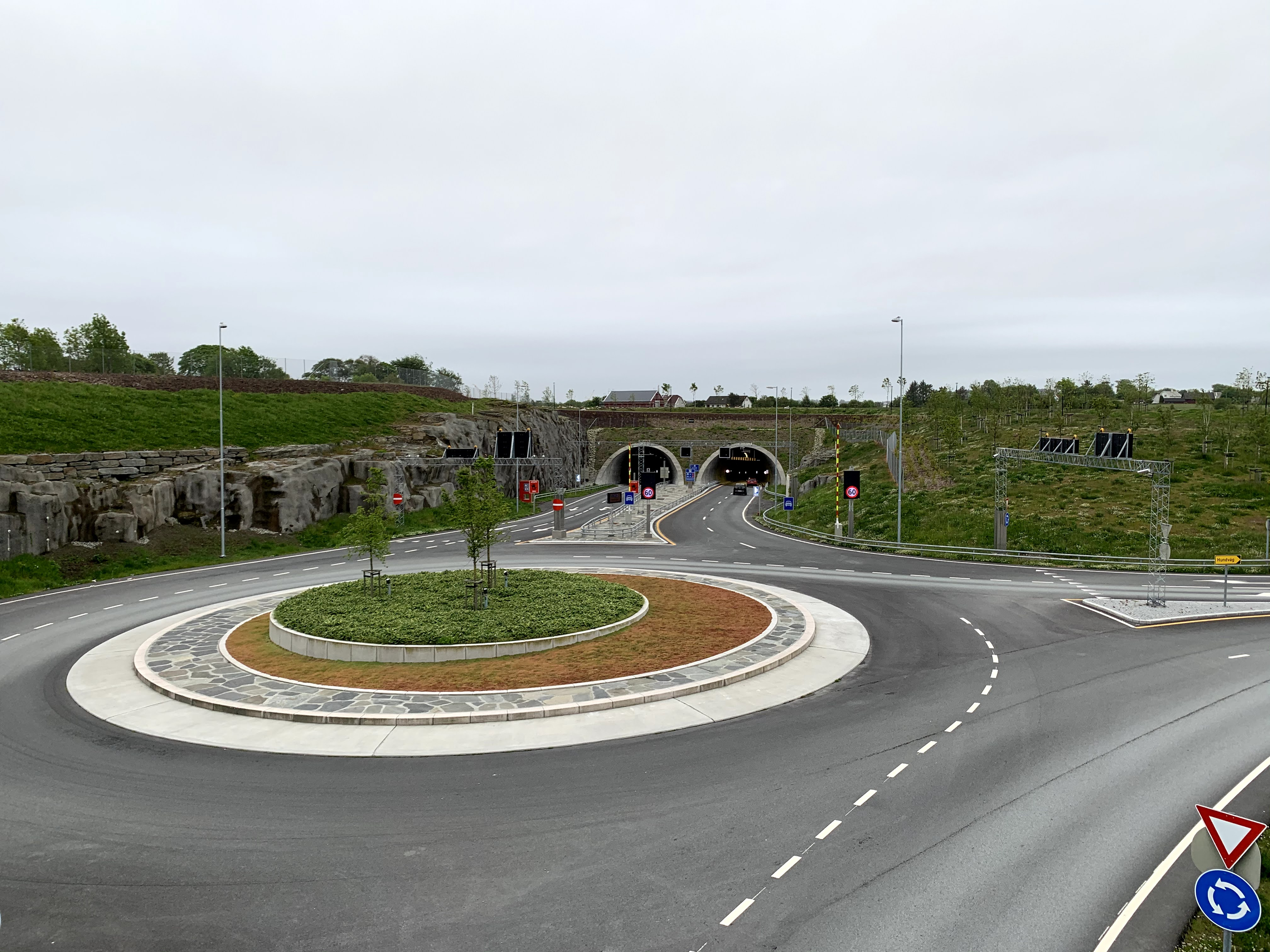
- View of the eastern entrance to the tunnel
- Interactive map of Hundvåg Tunnel; Hundvågtunnelen

Overview
- Location: Rogaland, Norway
- Coordinates: 58.9799°N 5.7409°E
- Route: Rv13

Operation
- Work began: 2014
- Opened: April 2020
- Operator: Statens vegvesen

Technical
- Length: 5,500 metres (18,000 ft)
- No. of lanes: 4 (2 tubes)
- Min elevation: −94.5 metres (−310 ft)
- Grade: 6%

The Hundvåg Tunnel (Norwegian: Hundvågtunnelen) is a road tunnel in Stavanger Municipality in Rogaland county, Norway. The 5.5-kilometre (3.4 mi) long tunnel is located on the Norwegian National Road 13 highway. The tunnel goes under the Byfjorden and it connects the mainland of the city of Stavanger and the island of Hundvåg. The tunnel is part of the Ryfast tunnel network that opened in 2019. The western end of the tunnel connects to the Eiganes Tunnel in the city of Stavanger. Near the eastern end of the tunnel, there is an exit to the island of Buøy as well. The tunnel exits on the island of Hundvåg, just a short distance from the entrance to the Ryfylke Tunnel, a much longer tunnel crossing the fjord to Ryfylke.
