= Eiganes =

Neighborhood in Stavanger, Norway

Coordinates: 58°57′52″N 05°43′01″E

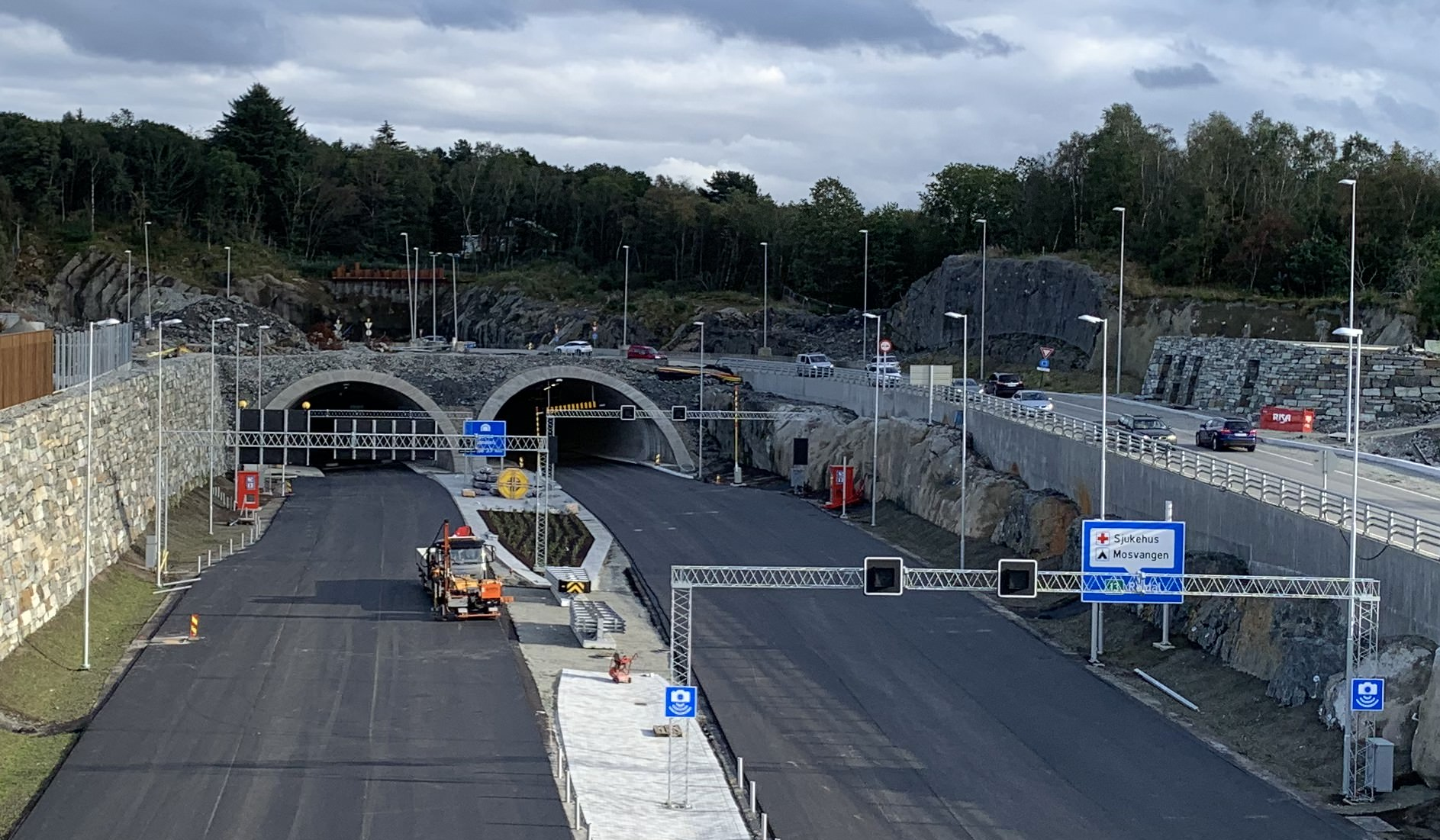
Eiganestunnelen under construction September 2019

Eiganes is a neighborhood (delområde) in the city of Stavanger which lies in the southwestern part of the large municipality of Stavanger in Rogaland county, Norway. It is located in the borough of Eiganes og Våland. The neighborhood has a population of 3,853, distributed over an area of 0.95 square kilometres (0.37 sq mi) between the Eiganes graveyard and the Vågen bay.

Historically, Eiganes was considered to be the upper-class neighborhood for the city of Stavanger. Traditionally, only the wealthy families resided in this area. However, middle-class people also reside in this neighborhood now and there are many modern apartments which are borettslags which is Norwegian cooperative housing. Many immigrants such as Poles, Italian, French, Romanian, and Asian people reside in this neighborhood.
