= Hundvåg Church =

Church in Rogaland, Norway

- Hundvåg kirke
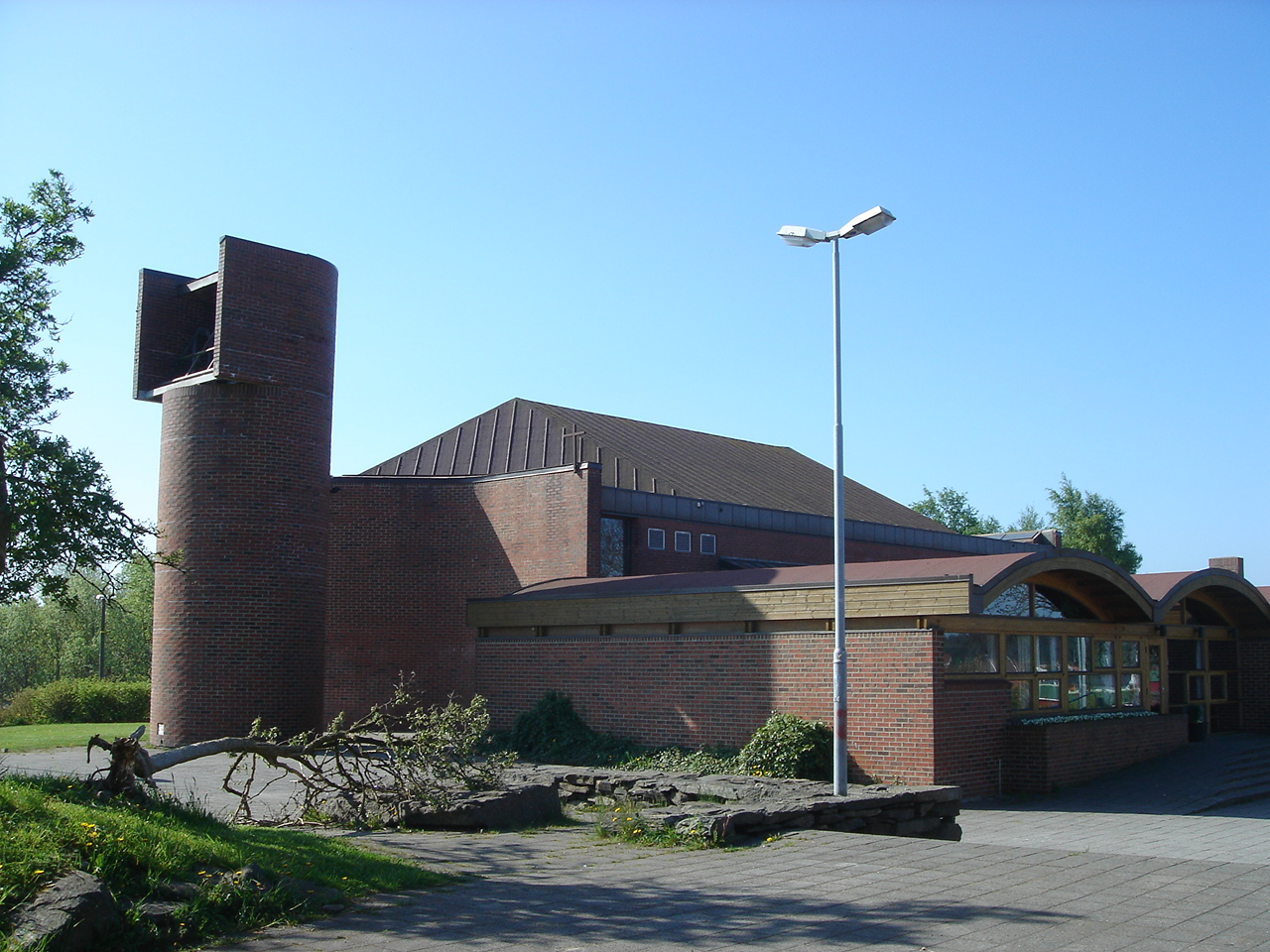
- View of the church
- Hundvåg Church
- 58.993233°N 5.726707°E
- Location: Stavanger Municipality, Rogaland
- Country: Norway
- Denomination: Church of Norway
- Churchmanship: Evangelical Lutheran

History
- Status: Parish church
- Founded: 12th century
- Consecrated: 1983

Architecture
- Functional status: Active
- Architect(s): Knut & Ingeborg Hoem
- Architectural type: Rectangular
- Completed: 1983 (43 years ago)

Specifications
- Capacity: 540
- Materials: Brick

Administration
- Diocese: Stavanger bispedømme
- Deanery: Stavanger domprosti
- Parish: Hundvåg
- Norwegian Cultural Heritage Site
- Type: Church
- Status: Not protected
- ID: 84659

Hundvåg Church (Norwegian: Hundvåg kirke) is a parish church of the Church of Norway in Stavanger Municipality in Rogaland county, Norway. It is located on the island of Hundvåg in the borough of Hundvåg in the northeastern part of the city of Stavanger. It is the church for the Hundvåg parish which is part of the Stavanger domprosti (arch-deanery) in the Diocese of Stavanger. The red brick church was built in a rectangular design in 1983 using designs by the architects Knut and Ingeborg Hoem. The church seats about 540 people.

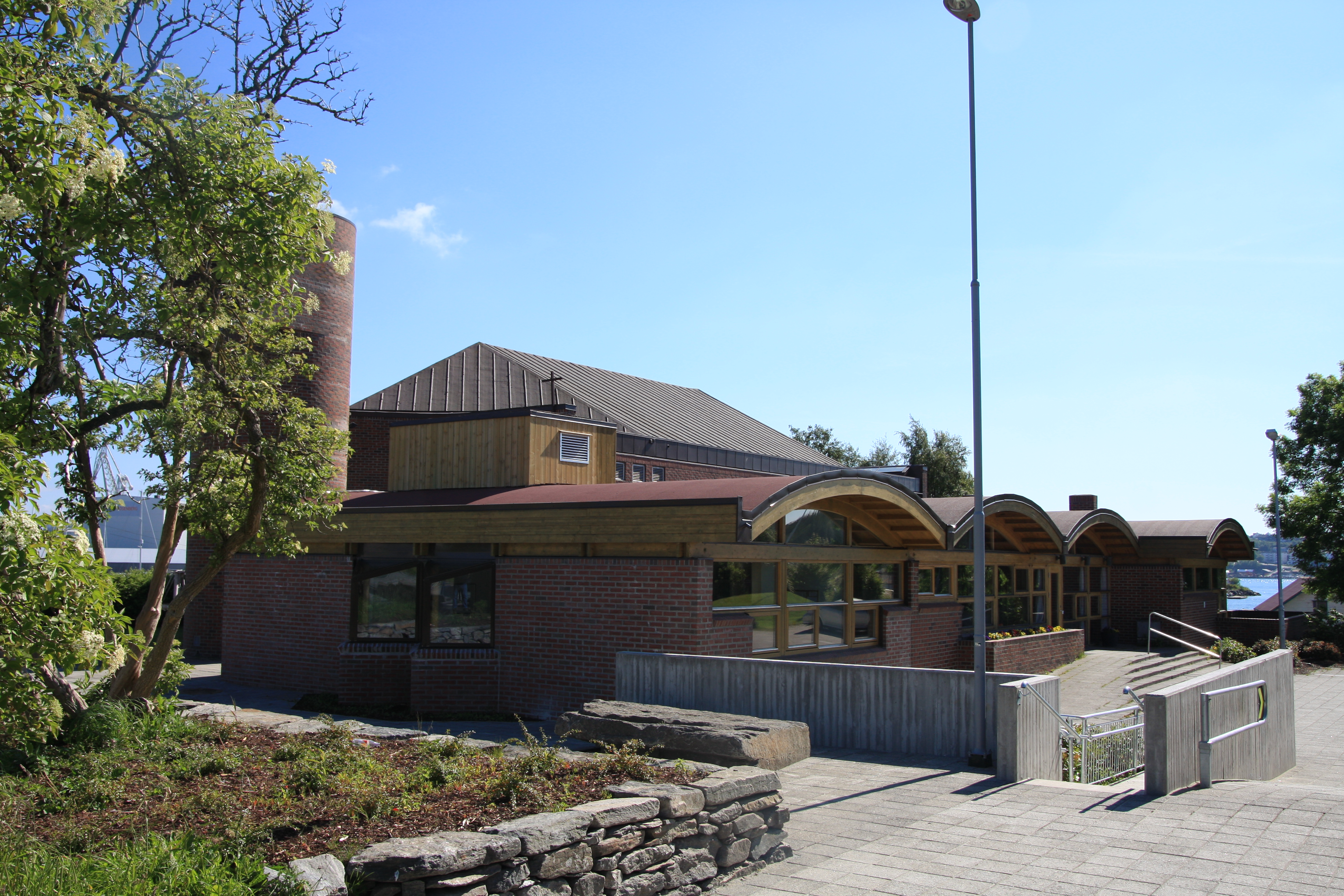
View of the church

== History ==
The earliest existing historical records of the church date back to the year 1300, but it was likely built in the mid-1100s. The first church on Hundvåg island was built at Austbø, about 500 metres (1,600 ft) east of the present site of the church. The church was probably a small Romanesque stone church. The church was no longer regularly used after the mid-1600s and from then on, the islanders had to travel to the nearby Frue Church on the mainland. By 1745, the church had become a ruin. In the 19th century, the stones from the old church were used to help restore the nearby Stavanger Cathedral, and at that time, the foundation was leveled and all traces of the old church were gone. Over 100 years later, a new church was built on the island at a more central location, about 500 metres (1,600 ft) to the west of the old church site.

== See also ==
- List of churches in Rogaland
- Informationen zur Jehmlich Orgel in der Kirche in Stavanger-Hundsvåg (in German)
