= Kampen, Stavanger =

Neighborhood in Stavanger, Norway

Coordinates: 58°58′24″N 5°42′47″E

Kampen is a neighborhood (delområde) in the city of Stavanger which lies in the southwestern part of the large municipality of Stavanger in Rogaland county, Norway. It is located in the northern part of the borough of Eiganes og Våland surrounding the Kampen Church. The neighborhood has a population of 6,050 which is distributed over an area of 1.75 square kilometres (430 acres).
