= Tasta Church =

Church in Rogaland, Norway

- Tasta kirke
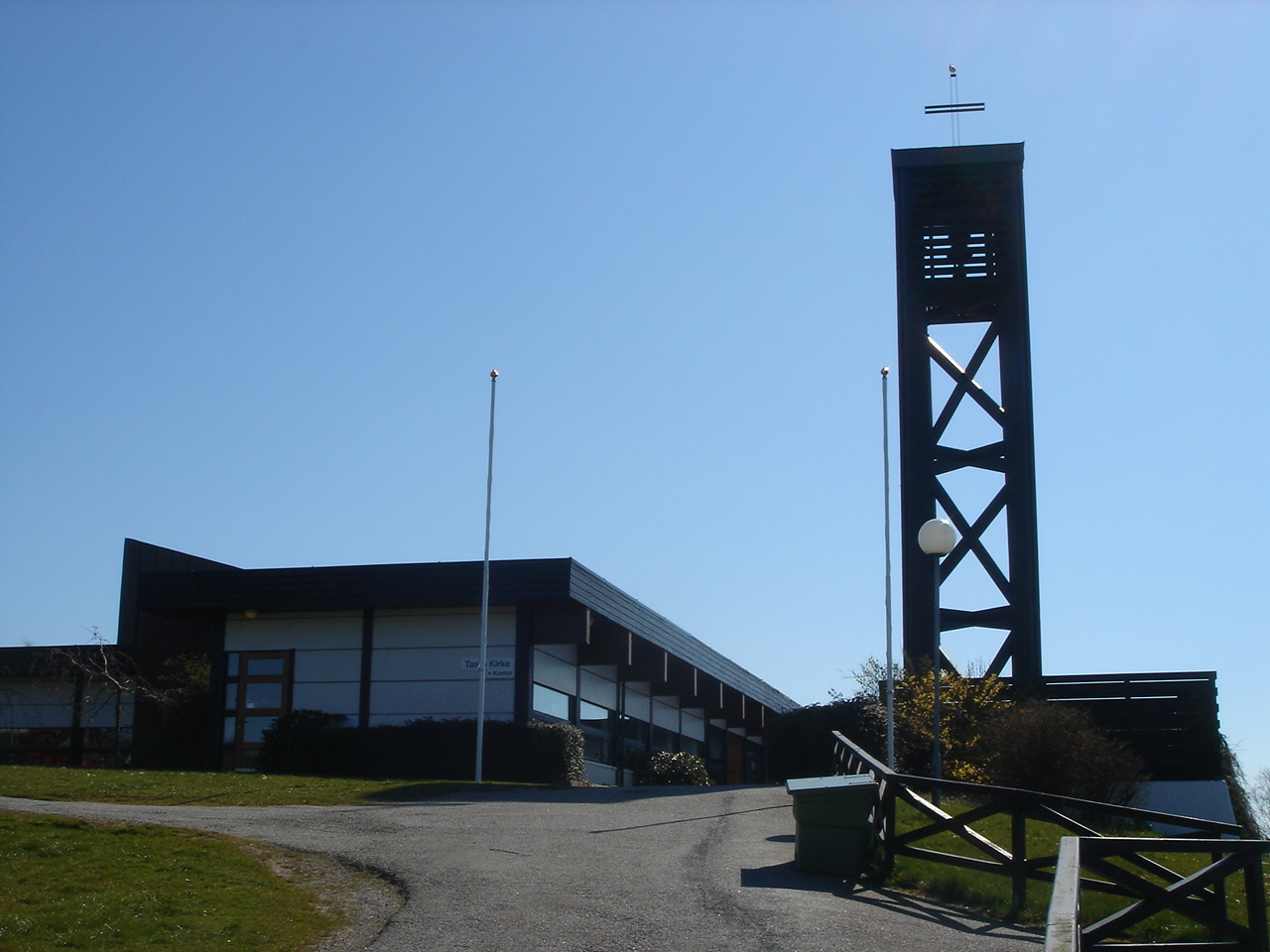
- View of the church
- Tasta Church
- 58.981299°N 5.693547°E
- Location: Stavanger Municipality, Rogaland
- Country: Norway
- Denomination: Church of Norway
- Churchmanship: Evangelical Lutheran

History
- Status: Parish church
- Founded: 1977
- Consecrated: 27 Nov 1977

Architecture
- Functional status: Active
- Architect(s): Per Faltinsen and Jan Jæger
- Architectural type: Rectangular
- Completed: 1977

Specifications
- Capacity: 450
- Materials: Concrete

Administration
- Diocese: Stavanger bispedømme
- Deanery: Ytre Stavanger prosti
- Parish: Tasta
- Norwegian Cultural Heritage Site
- Type: Church
- Status: Not protected
- ID: 85611

Tasta Church (Norwegian: Tasta kirke) is a parish church of the Church of Norway in the southern part of the large Stavanger Municipality in Rogaland county, Norway. It is located in the Indre Tasta neighborhood in the borough of Tasta in the northern part of the city of Stavanger. It is the church for the Tasta parish which is part of the Ytre Stavanger prosti (deanery) in the Diocese of Stavanger. The concrete church was built in a rectangular design in 1977 using designs by the architects Jan Jæger and Per Faltinsen. The church seats about 450 people.

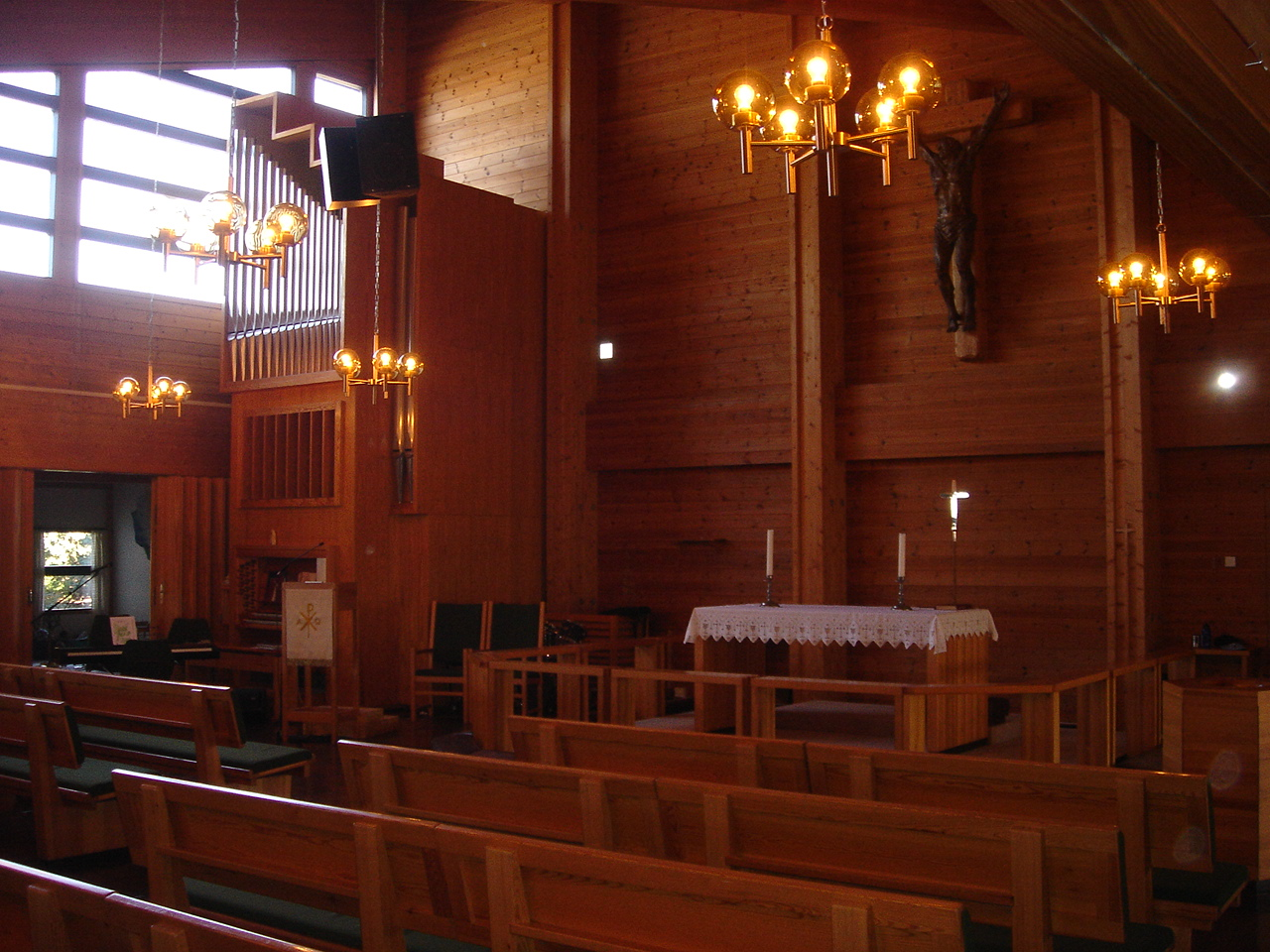
View of the interior of the church

== See also ==
- List of churches in Rogaland
- Informationen zur Jehmlich Orgel.
