= Kvalaberg =

Neighborhood in Stavanger, Norway

Kvalaberg is a neighborhood (delområde) in the city of Stavanger which lies in the southwestern part of the large municipality of Stavanger in Rogaland county, Norway. It is located in the borough of Hillevåg, between the European route E39 highway and the Gandsfjorden. The neighborhood has a population of 5,112 which is distributed over an area of 2.19 square kilometres (540 acres).
