= Stavanger Buss-Selskap =

Norwegian bus company

Stavanger Buss-Selskap AS
- Industry: Transport
- Founded: 10 July 1937
- Defunct: 1975
- Successor: Stavanger og Omegn Trafikkselskap
- Headquarters: Stavanger, Norway

Stavanger Buss-Selskap was a Norwegian bus company responsible for operating the city bus system of Stavanger. It was created on 10 July 1937 and operated until 1975, when it was taken over by Stavanger og Omegn Trafikkselskap. To begin with, the company had 11 buses, but soon added more. Between 1947 and 1963 it also operated the Stavanger trolleybus system with five trolleybuses.
