= Ytre Tasta =

Neighborhood in Stavanger, Norway

Coordinates: 58°59′41″N 05°41′06″E

Ytre Tasta is a neighborhood (delområde) in the city of Stavanger which lies in the southwestern part of the large Stavanger Municipality in Rogaland county, Norway. It is located in the northern part of the mainland borough of Tasta. The Indre Tasta neighborhood lies to the south, the Gandsfjorden is to the east, and Randaberg Municipality is to the north and west. The neighborhood has a population of 7,909 which is distributed over an area of 6.01 square kilometres (2.32 sq mi). Vardeneset Church is located in this neighborhood.
