= Hillevåg =

Borough of Stavanger, Norway

Hillevåg bydel
- Borough
- Coat of arms

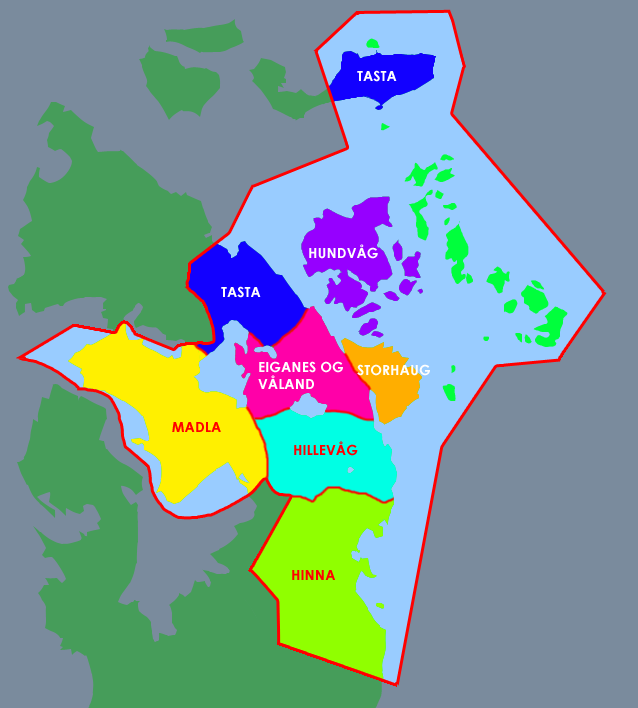
- Location within Stavanger municipality
- Coordinates: 58°56′40″N 05°44′40″E
- Country: Norway
- Region: Western Norway
- County: Rogaland
- District: Jæren
- City: Stavanger

Area
  - Total: 8.08 km^{2} (3.12 sq mi)
- Elevation: 25 m (82 ft)

Population (2025)
  - Total: 20,959
  - Density: 2,590/km^{2} (6,720/sq mi)
- Time zone: UTC+01:00 (CET)
  - Summer (DST): UTC+02:00 (CEST)
- Post Code: 4016 Stavanger

Hillevåg is a borough of the city of Stavanger which lies in the southwestern part of the large Stavanger Municipality in Rogaland county, Norway. It is located southwest of the city centre, south of the lake Mosvatnet, and north of the borough of Hinna. Hillevåg was a part of the old Hetland Municipality until 1965. The borough has residential areas as well as some industrial areas. The University of Stavanger and the Norwegian Petroleum Directorate are located in Hillevåg also. The 8.08-square-kilometre (2,000-acre) borough has a population (2025) of 20,959.

== Neighbourhoods ==
Although the borders of "neighbourhoods" (delområder) do not correspond exactly to the borough borders, Hillevåg roughly consists of the following neighbourhoods: Ullandhaug, Vaulen, Kvalaberg, Tjensvoll, and Bekkefaret.

== Politics ==
The borough is not independently self-governing, but it falls under the municipal council for Stavanger Municipality. The municipal council has delegated some responsibilities to the a borough council (Norwegian: bydelsutvalg) for Hillevåg. The borough council consists of 11 members. The tables below show the current and historical composition of the borough council by political party.

Hillevåg bydelsutvalg 2023–2027
| Party name (in Norwegian) | Number of representatives |
|---|---|
| Labour Party (Arbeiderpartiet) | 3 |
| Green Party (Miljøpartiet De Grønne) | 1 |
| Conservative Party (Høyre) | 4 |
| Christian Democratic Party (Kristelig Folkeparti) | 1 |
| Red Party (Rødt) | 1 |
| Liberal Party (Venstre) | 1 |
| Total number of members: | 11 |

Hillevåg bydelsutvalg 2019–2023
| Party name (in Norwegian) | Number of representatives |
|---|---|
| Labour Party (Arbeiderpartiet) | 3 |
| Progress Party (Fremskrittspartiet) | 1 |
| Green Party (Miljøpartiet De Grønne) | 1 |
| Conservative Party (Høyre) | 2 |
| Christian Democratic Party (Kristelig Folkeparti) | 1 |
| Red Party (Rødt) | 1 |
| Socialist Left Party (Sosialistisk Venstreparti) | 1 |
| Liberal Party (Venstre) | 1 |
| Total number of members: | 11 |

Hillevåg bydelsutvalg 2015–2019
| Party name (in Norwegian) | Number of representatives |
|---|---|
| Labour Party (Arbeiderpartiet) | 3 |
| Progress Party (Fremskrittspartiet) | 1 |
| Green Party (Miljøpartiet De Grønne) | 1 |
| Conservative Party (Høyre) | 2 |
| Christian Democratic Party (Kristelig Folkeparti) | 1 |
| Centre Party (Senterpartiet) | 1 |
| Liberal Party (Venstre) | 2 |
| Total number of members: | 11 |
