= Stokke (surname) =

Stokke is a surname. It may refer to:

- Allison Stokke, an American pole vaulter and fitness model
- Benjamin Stokke, a Norwegian football player
- Bernhard Stokke, a Norwegian educationalist, textbook writer, and children's writer
- Dag Stokke, a Norwegian keyboardist, church organist, and mastering engineer
- H. E. Stokke, a Norwegian railway director and Mayor of Oslo
- Ivar Stokke, a Norwegian wrestler who competed in the 1936 Summer Olympics
- Jonathan Stokke, an American tennis coach and former All-American player at Duke University
- Linn Stokke, a Norwegian actress, author, singer and composer
- Lisa Stokke, a Norwegian singer and actress
- Melanie Stokke, a Norwegian tennis player
- Roar Stokke, a former Norwegian football player, coach, and commentator
- Steinar Stokke, a Norwegian businessperson and former civil servant, with prominent positions in the health sector
- Tor Stokke, a Norwegian film actor
