= Eiganes og Våland =

Borough in Stavanger, Norway

Eiganes og Våland bydel
- Borough
- Coat of arms

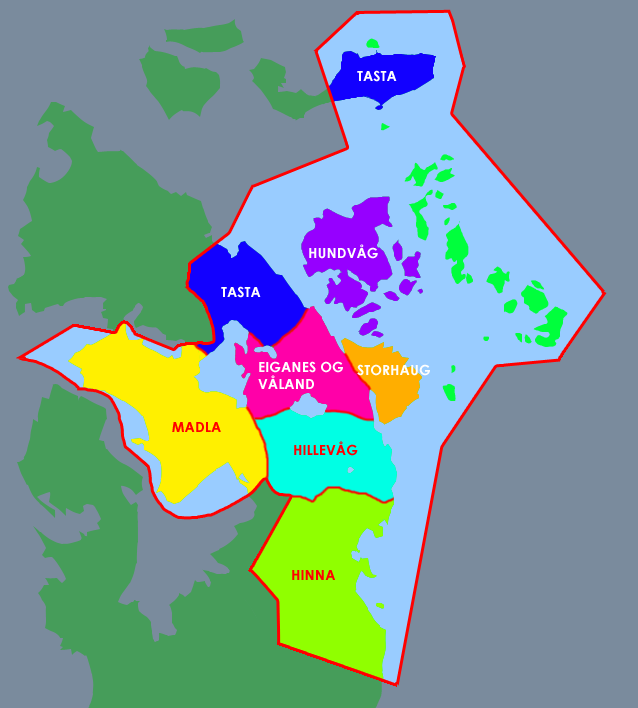
- Location within Stavanger municipality
- Coordinates: 58°58′04″N 05°43′01″E
- Country: Norway
- Region: Western Norway
- County: Rogaland
- District: Jæren
- City: Stavanger

Area
  - Total: 7.01 km^{2} (2.71 sq mi)
- Elevation: 51 m (167 ft)

Population (2024)
  - Total: 25,389
  - Density: 3,620/km^{2} (9,380/sq mi)
- Time zone: UTC+01:00 (CET)
  - Summer (DST): UTC+02:00 (CEST)
- Post Code: 4009 Stavanger

Eiganes og Våland is a borough of the city of Stavanger which lies in the southwestern part of the large Stavanger Municipality in Rogaland county, Norway. It is located just west of the city centre, north of the lake Mosvatnet, west of the lake Stokkavatnet, and south of the borough of Tasta. The 7.01-square-kilometre (1,730-acre) borough has a population (2024) of 25,389. There are two churches in Eiganes og Våland: Stokka Church and Kampen Church.

== Neighbourhoods ==
Although the borders of "neighbourhoods" (delområder) do not correspond exactly to the borough borders, Eiganes og Våland roughly consists of the following neighbourhoods: Våland, Eiganes, Kampen, and Stokka.

== Politics ==
The borough is not independently self-governing, but it falls under the municipal council for Stavanger Municipality. The municipal council has delegated some responsibilities to the a borough council (Norwegian: bydelsutvalg) for Eiganes og Våland. The borough council consists of 11 members. The tables below show the current and historical composition of the borough council by political party.

Eiganes og Våland bydelsutvalg 2023–2027
Party name (in Norwegian)	Number of representatives
Labour Party (Arbeiderpartiet)	3
Progress Party (Fremskrittspartiet)	1
Green Party (Miljøpartiet De Grønne)	1
Conservative Party (Høyre)	3
Socialist Left Party (Sosialistisk Venstreparti)	1
Liberal Party (Venstre)	2
Total number of members:	11

Eiganes og Våland bydelsutvalg 2019–2023
Party name (in Norwegian)	Number of representatives
Labour Party (Arbeiderpartiet)	3
People's Action No to More Road Tolls (Folkeaksjonen nei til mer bompenger)	1
Progress Party (Fremskrittspartiet)	1
Green Party (Miljøpartiet De Grønne)	1
Conservative Party (Høyre)	2
Socialist Left Party (Sosialistisk Venstreparti)	1
Liberal Party (Venstre)	2
Total number of members:	11

Eiganes og Våland bydelsutvalg 2015–2019
Party name (in Norwegian)	Number of representatives
Labour Party (Arbeiderpartiet)	4
Progress Party (Fremskrittspartiet)	1
Conservative Party (Høyre)	2
Christian Democratic Party (Kristelig Folkeparti)	1
Centre Party (Senterpartiet)	1
Socialist Left Party (Sosialistisk Venstreparti)	1
Liberal Party (Venstre)	1
Total number of members:	11
