= Stokka Church =

Church in Rogaland, Norway

- Stokka kirke
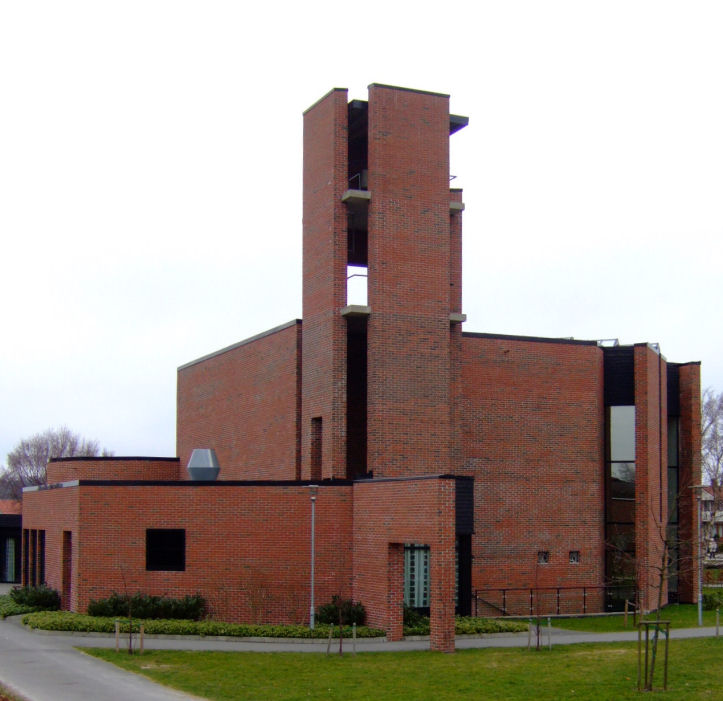
- View of the church
- Stokka Church
- 58.964058°N 5.690438°E
- Location: Stavanger Municipality, Rogaland
- Country: Norway
- Denomination: Church of Norway
- Churchmanship: Evangelical Lutheran

History
- Status: Parish church
- Founded: 1974
- Consecrated: 1974

Architecture
- Functional status: Active
- Architect: Byarkitekten Stavanger
- Architectural type: Fan-shaped
- Completed: 1974 (52 years ago)

Specifications
- Capacity: 500
- Materials: Brick

Administration
- Diocese: Stavanger bispedømme
- Deanery: Stavanger domprosti
- Parish: Stokka

Stokka Church (Norwegian: Stokka kirke) is a parish church of the Church of Norway in Stavanger Municipality in Rogaland county, Norway. It is located in the Stokka neighborhood in the Eiganes og Våland borough in the city of Stavanger. It is the church for the Stokka parish which is part of the Stavanger domprosti (arch-deanery) in the Diocese of Stavanger. The red brick church was built in a fan-shaped design in 1974 using designs by the architectural firm: Byarkitekten Stavanger. The church seats about 500 people.

== See also ==
- List of churches in Rogaland
