= Våland =

Neighborhood in Stavanger, Norway

Coordinates: 58°57′N 5°44′E

Våland is a neighborhood (delområde) in the city of Stavanger which lies in the southwestern part of the large municipality of Stavanger in Rogaland county, Norway. It is located in the borough of Eiganes og Våland. It is located to the south part of central Stavanger—east of Mosvatnet lake. The neighborhood has a population of 6,152 which is distributed over an area of 2.23 square kilometres (550 acres).

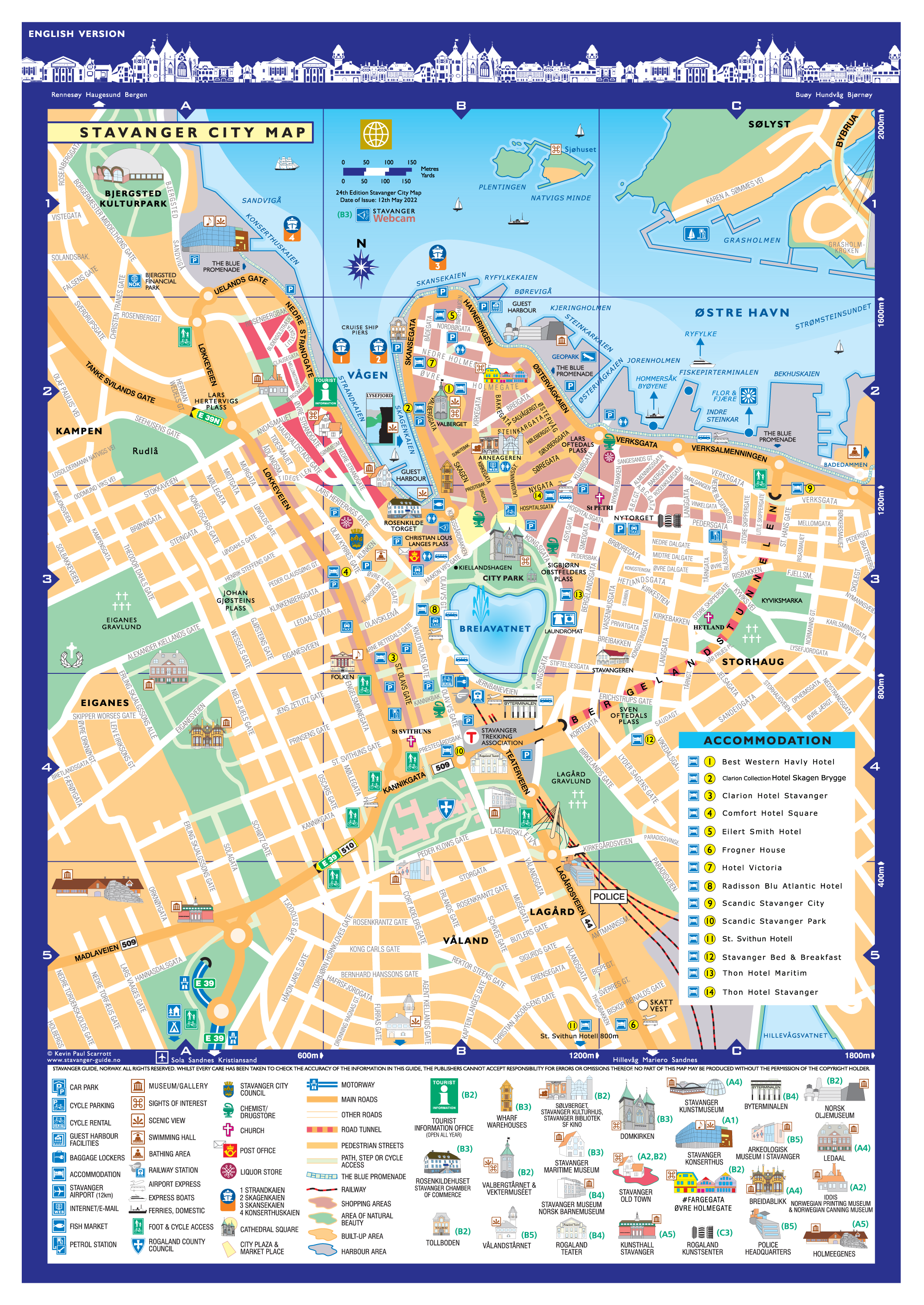
Map of Våland and surroundings

== History ==
Våland was populated around the 18th century. Its highest point is the 84-metre (276 ft) tall Våland tower. Before today's tower was built, there supposedly stood a watchtower at the area. It was called Vålandspibå (the Våland pipe), a name still used for the tower.
