= Mosvatnet =

Lake in Rogaland, Norway

- Mose-vandet (historic)
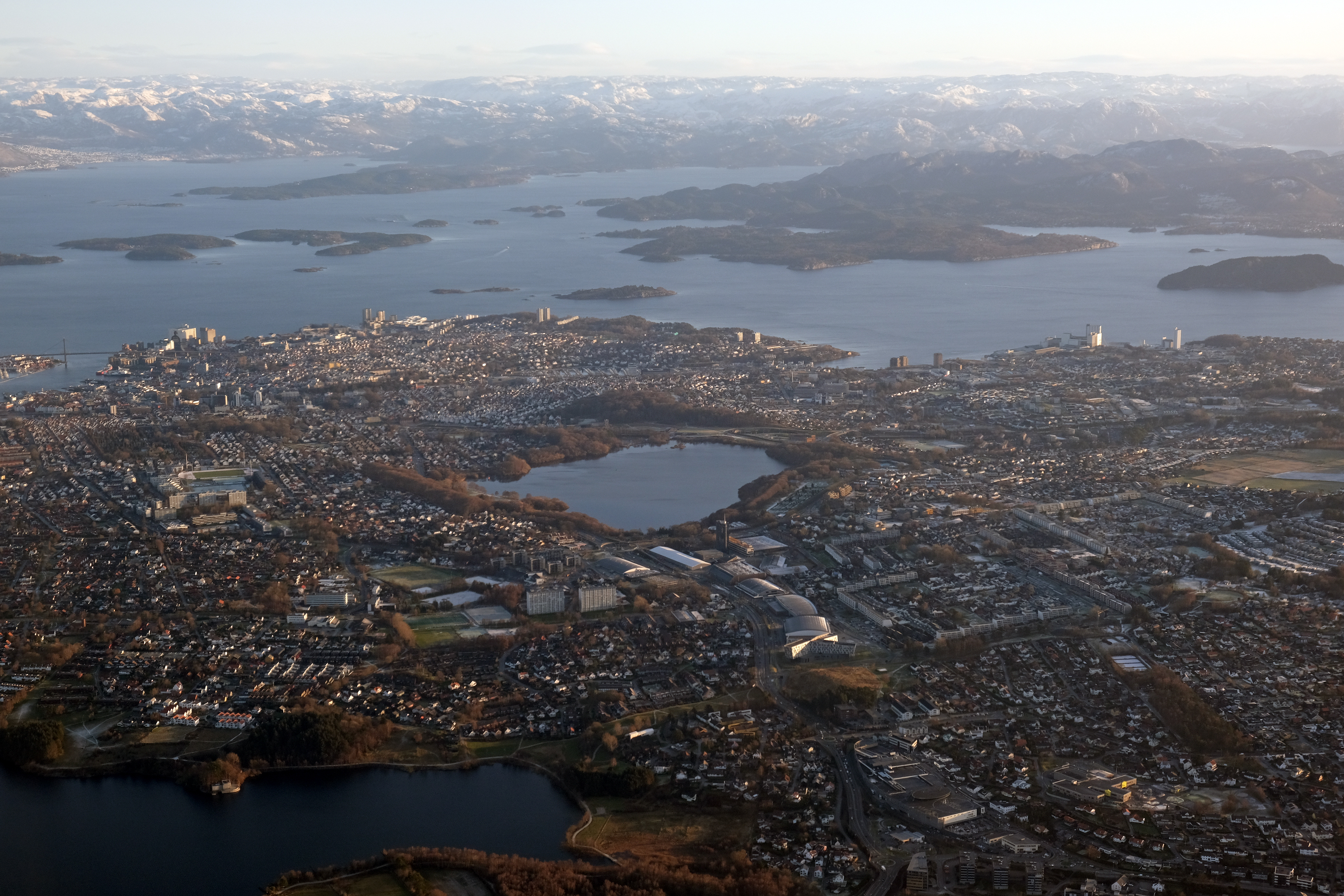
- Aerial view of the lake situated west of the centre of Stavanger
- Interactive map of Mosvatnet
- Location: Stavanger Municipality, Rogaland
- Coordinates: 58.95686°N 5.71148°E
- Basin countries: Norway
- Max. length: 800 metres (2,600 ft)
- Max. width: 1 kilometre (0.62 mi)
- Surface area: 45 ha (110 acres)
- Average depth: 2 metres (6 ft 7 in)
- Max. depth: 3.2 metres (10 ft)
- Surface elevation: 37 metres (121 ft)
- References: NVE

Mosvatnet is a lake in Stavanger Municipality in Rogaland county, Norway. The lake lies just west of the centre of the city of Stavanger in the Eiganes og Våland borough. At 45 hectares (110 acres), it is the third largest lake in the city of Stavanger after Hålandsvatnet and Stora Stokkavatnet. The lake reaches a maximum depth of 3.2 metres (10 ft) and it lies at an elevation of 37 metres (121 ft) above sea level. The lake flows out through a small stream that runs through underground culverts to the Breiavatnet lake before emptying into the nearby Byfjorden.

== Reservoir ==
Mosvatnet was Stavanger's main water source between 1863 and 1931. The Great Fire of Holmen in Stavanger in 1860 showed that the city had a weak water supply. In 1863, the city initiated the building of a new waterworks at Mosvatnet that both would give residents proper drinking water and better access to water for fire crews. A pump house was erected and water pipes were laid along the road Madlaveien (Rv 509). The water level of the pond was increased significantly, and several small islets and rocks disappeared. The city took over several properties along the lake to prevent contamination of drinking water source and it made the surrounding areas into parkland. After a short time it was realized that Mosvatnet did not have enough capacity to supply the growing city with drinking water in the long term. In 1903, the city of Stavanger bought water rights for the Stora Stokkavatnet lake and in 1930 that lake became the city's new water reservoir.

== See also ==
- List of lakes in Norway
