= Hundvåg, Stavanger =

Borough in Stavanger, Norway

Hundvåg bydel
- Borough
- Coat of arms

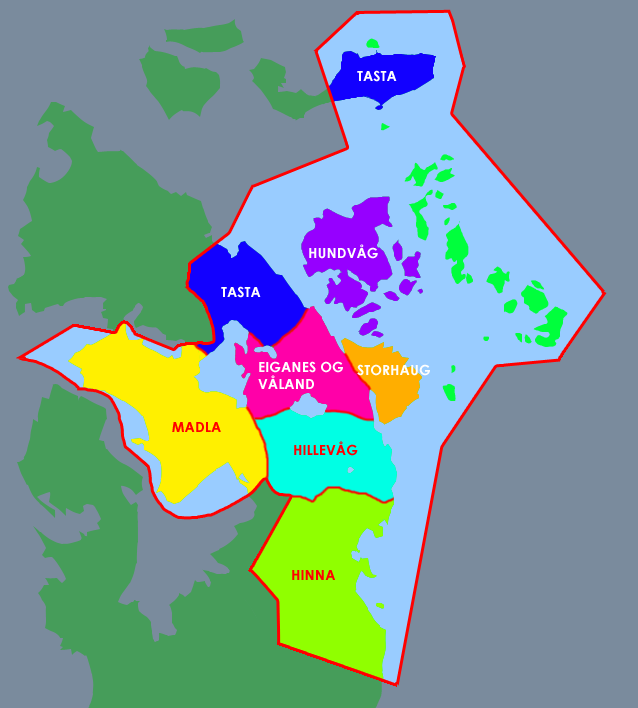
- Location within Stavanger municipality
- Coordinates: 58°59′50″N 05°43′53″E
- Country: Norway
- Region: Western Norway
- County: Rogaland
- District: Jæren
- City: Stavanger

Area
  - Total: 6.41 km^{2} (2.47 sq mi)
- Elevation: 19 m (62 ft)

Population (2022)
  - Total: 13,197
  - Density: 2,060/km^{2} (5,330/sq mi)
- Time zone: UTC+01:00 (CET)
  - Summer (DST): UTC+02:00 (CEST)
- Post Code: 4083 Hundvåg

Hundvåg is a borough of the city of Stavanger which lies in the southwestern part of the large Stavanger Municipality in Rogaland county, Norway. The borough includes a number of islands lying to the north of the main city centre of Stavanger. It includes the islands of Hundvåg, Sølyst, Grasholmen, Engøy, Buøy, Bjørnøy, Roaldsøy, and Ormøy. These islands are all connected together by bridges and they are connected to mainland Stavanger by the Stavanger City Bridge. The 6.41-square-kilometre (1,580-acre) borough has a population (2022) of 13,197.

== Neighbourhoods ==
Although the borders of city's "neighbourhoods" (delområder) do not correspond exactly to the borough borders, Hundvåg roughly consists of the neighbourhoods of Buøy and Hundvåg.

== Politics ==
The borough is not independently self-governing, but it falls under the municipal council for Stavanger Municipality. The municipal council has delegated some responsibilities to the a borough council (Norwegian: bydelsutvalg) for Hundvåg. The borough council consists of 11 members. The tables below show the current and historical composition of the borough council by political party.

Hundvåg bydelsutvalg 2023–2027
Party name (in Norwegian)	Number of representatives
Labour Party (Arbeiderpartiet)	3
Progress Party (Fremskrittspartiet)	2
Conservative Party (Høyre)	2
Industry and Business Party (Industri‑ og Næringspartiet)	1
Christian Democratic Party (Kristelig Folkeparti)	1
Red Party (Rødt)	1
Liberal Party (Venstre)	1
Total number of members:	11

Hundvåg bydelsutvalg 2019–2023
Party name (in Norwegian)	Number of representatives
Labour Party (Arbeiderpartiet)	3
People's Action No to More Road Tolls (Folkeaksjonen nei til mer bompenger)	2
Progress Party (Fremskrittspartiet)	2
Conservative Party (Høyre)	3
Red Party (Rødt)	1
Total number of members:	11

Hundvåg bydelsutvalg 2015–2019
Party name (in Norwegian)	Number of representatives
Labour Party (Arbeiderpartiet)	3
Progress Party (Fremskrittspartiet)	2
Green Party (Miljøpartiet De Grønne)	1
Conservative Party (Høyre)	2
Christian Democratic Party (Kristelig Folkeparti)	1
Liberal Party (Venstre)	1
Local List(s) (Lokale lister)	1
Total number of members:	11
