= Stora Stokkavatnet =

Lake in Stavanger, Norway

- Interactive map of Stora Stokkavatnet
- Location: Stavanger Municipality, Rogaland
- Coordinates: 58.96517°N 5.66782°E
- Basin countries: Norway
- Max. length: 2.6 kilometres (1.6 mi)
- Max. width: 1.6 kilometres (0.99 mi)
- Surface area: 2.12 km^{2} (0.82 sq mi)
- Max. depth: 42 metres (138 ft)
- Shore length^{1}: 7,900 metres (25,900 ft)
- Surface elevation: 11 metres (36 ft)
- References: NVE
- ^{1} Shore length is not a well-defined measure.

Stora Stokkavatnet is a lake in Stavanger Municipality in Rogaland county, Norway. The 2.12-square-kilometre (0.82 sq mi) lake lies just west of the centre of the city of Stavanger. The lake lies in the western part of the municipality and it forms the boundary of the boroughs of Tasta (to the north), Eiganes og Våland (to the east), and Madla (to the south and west).

From 1931 until 1959, this lake was the reservoir for the city's drinking water. Since 2009, the lake has been the back-up water supply.

== See also ==
- List of lakes in Norway
