= Stavanger City Bridge =

Fixed link in Rogoland, Norway

Stavanger City Bridge Stavanger Bybru, Bybrua
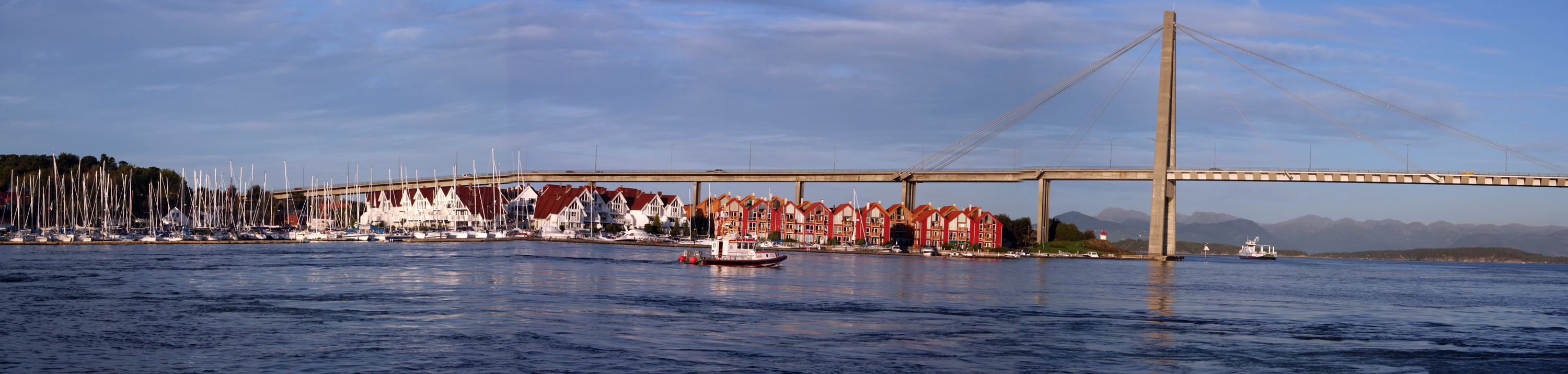
- View of the bridge
- Coordinates: 58.9696°N 5.7483°E
- Carries: Fv435
- Crosses: Straumsteinsundet
- Locale: Stavanger, Norway

Characteristics
- Design: Cantilever spar cable-stayed bridge
- Material: Concrete
- Total length: 1,067 metres (3,501 ft)
- Longest span: 185 metres (607 ft)
- No. of spans: 24
- Clearance above: 26 metres (85 ft)

History
- Opened: 31 Jan 1978

Location
- Interactive map of Stavanger City Bridge

Stavanger City Bridge (Norwegian: Stavanger bybru or just Bybrua) is a cable-stayed bridge in the city of Stavanger which is in the large Stavanger Municipality in Rogaland county, Norway. The bridge has one tower and it was one of the first larger cable-stayed bridges in Norway when it opened on 31 January 1978. The bridge crosses the Straumsteinsundet strait connecting the city centre of Stavanger to the small islands of Grasholmen and Sølyst. It is the main connection to the whole the borough of Hundvåg which is a series of islands that are all interconnected by small bridges.

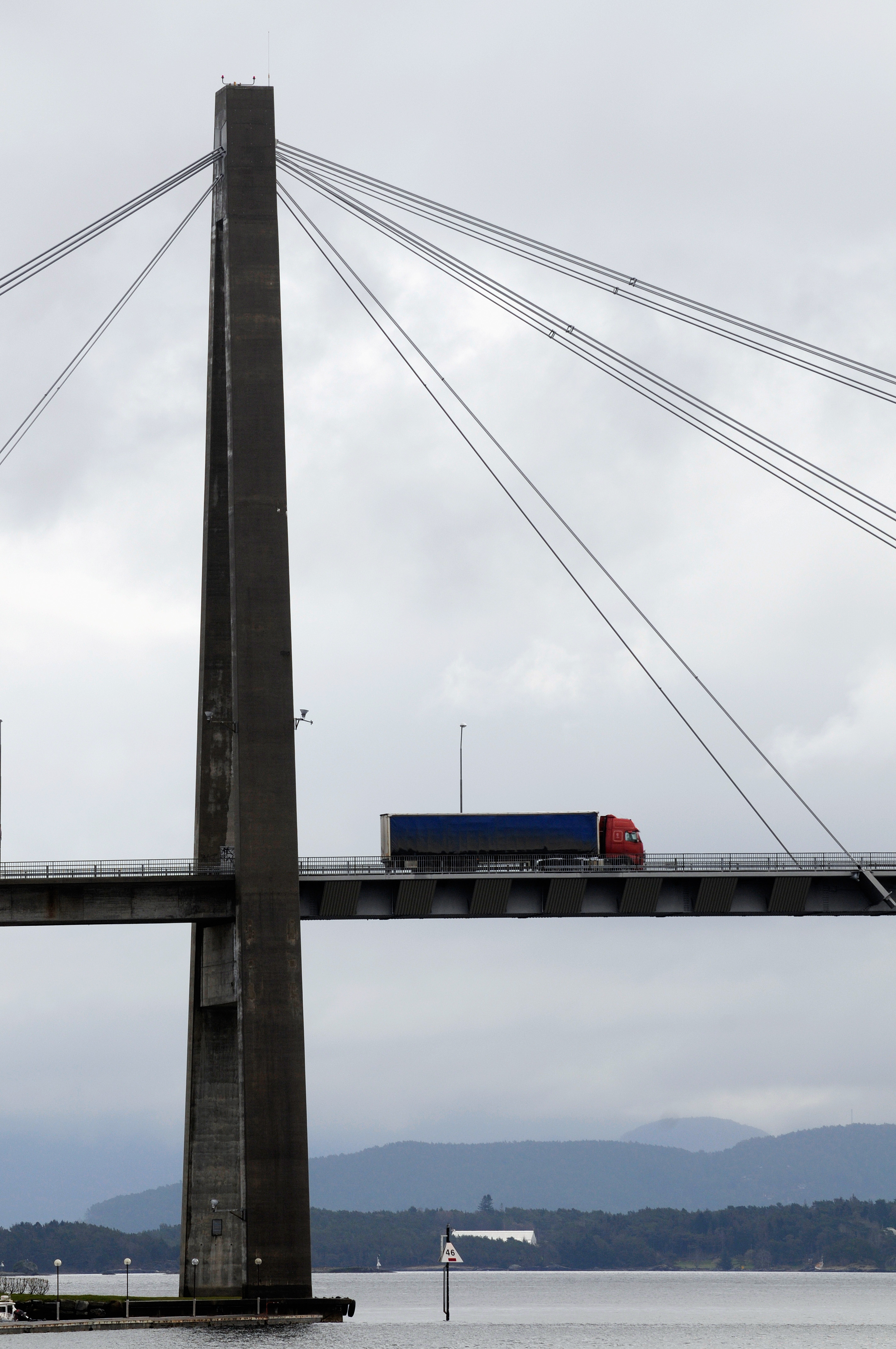
Stavanger bybru

The Stavanger City Bridge is 1,067 metres (3,501 ft) long, the main span is 185 metres (607 ft), and the maximum clearance to the sea is 26 metres (85 ft). The reinforced concrete bridge has 24 spans.

The bridge has a high volume of travelers crossing it every day. This has led to the construction of the new Hundvåg Tunnel, which will connect the mainland city of Stavanger with the islands of Buøy and Hundvåg. The tunnel opened in 2020. It runs under the strait, immediately west of the bridge.
