= Buøy =

Island in Stavanger, Norway

Buøy Buøen (historic)
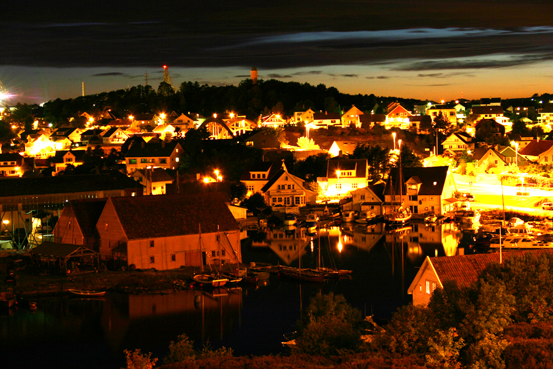
- View of Engøy and Buøy in the evening
- Interactive map of the island

Geography
- Location: Rogaland, Norway
- Coordinates: 58.98576°N 5.73166°E
- Area: 0.6 km^{2} (0.23 sq mi)
- Length: 1.1 km (0.68 mi)
- Width: 1.3 km (0.81 mi)

Administration
- Norway
- County: Rogaland
- Municipality: Stavanger Municipality

Demographics
- Population: 1217 (2021)

Buøy is an island in Stavanger Municipality in Rogaland county, Norway. It is located in the borough of Hundvåg in the city of Stavanger. The 0.6-square-kilometre (150-acre) island was formerly separated from the island of Hundvåg by a small channel of water, but that was filled in and now it is part of the island of Hundvåg. Buøy is connected to the mainland city of Stavanger by a series of bridges over three other islands and the Byfjorden.

Buøy is also the name of an official neighborhood (delområde) of the city. The neighborhood has a population of 1,792 which is distributed over an area of 1.19 square kilometres (0.46 sq mi) including the islands of Buøy, Engøy, Sølyst, and Grasholmen.

== History ==
The name "Buøy" comes from 'Bu-skap' and 'øy', meaning an island where farmers earlier had their cattle.

Buøy has long been the site for Rosenberg Mekaniske Verksted. Rosenberg was founded in 1896, started up in Sandvigå in Stavanger and moved to Buøy in 1898. Rosenberg started making ships here and later moved on to building supertankers and constructing platforms for the Norwegian oil industry in the North Sea. At the beginning of the century Rosenberg had a great influence on the development of Buøy and in September 1915 they stated the need for regulated roads, a ferry connection and a stable water supply for the island. Rosenberg Verft AS (as it is known today) has about 500 employees and is a major contractor within the Norwegian oil and gas market.

Buøy is today well known for its famous 17.5-metre-tall (57 ft), 3.5-metre-wide (11 ft) water tower (featuring a design credited to Lars Backer) which stands on the island's tallest mountain. The tower has a wind vane on the top of it with an image of a mother and a son by a well pump. The bright-yellow tower was built in 1919–1920 and is a well-known landmark in the Stavanger region.

In 1977, Buøy was connected to the mainland when the city bridge was built.

Buøy also has two football pitches.

== See also ==
- List of islands of Norway
