= Rennesøy, Stavanger =

Borough in Stavanger, Norway

Rennesøy kommunedel
- Borough
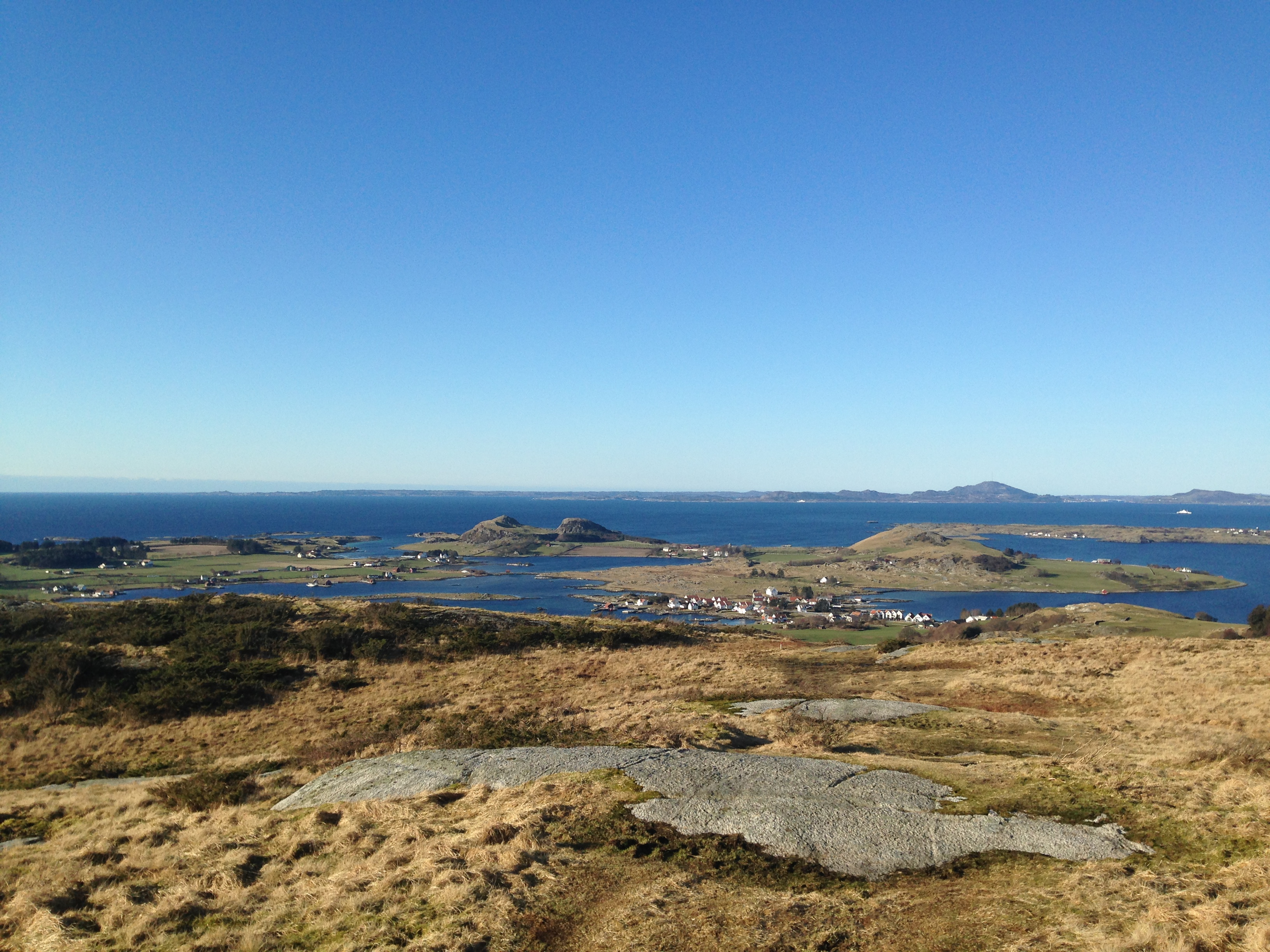
- View of Klosterøy and Fjøløy
- Interactive map of Rennesøy kommunedel
- Coordinates: 59.10556°N 5.69167°E
- Country: Norway
- Region: Central Norway
- County: Rogaland
- District: Jæren
- City: Stavanger

Area
  - Total: 66 km^{2} (25 sq mi)
- Elevation: 39 m (128 ft)

Population (2024)
  - Total: 5,260
  - Density: 80/km^{2} (210/sq mi)
- Time zone: UTC+01:00 (CET)
  - Summer (DST): UTC+02:00 (CEST)
- Post Code: 4150 Rennesøy

Rennesøy is a borough in the large Stavanger Municipality in Rogaland county, Norway. The 66-square-kilometre (25 sq mi) borough is made up entirely of islands located in the Boknafjorden to the northeast of the city of Stavanger. In 2024, there were 5,260 residents of the borough, mostly living on the islands of Rennesøy, Mosterøy, Klosterøy, Sokn, Åmøy, and Bru.

Rennesøy is characterized by beautiful, varied, and distinctive cultural landscapes which show that people have lived and farmed here for a long time. The oldest cultural monuments date back to the Stone Age. Rennesøy has large agricultural areas and fertile soil. Agriculture is the dominant industry, employing around 14 percent of the working population.

== History ==
The old Rennesøy Municipality existed from 1 January 1838 until 1 January 2020 when it became part of the newly-enlarged Stavanger Municipality. After the merger, the old Finnøy Municipality became the borough of Rennesøy within the new municipality.

== Politics ==
The borough is not independently self-governing, but it falls under the municipal council for Stavanger Municipality. The municipal council has delegated some responsibilities to the a borough council (Norwegian: kommunedelsutvalg) for Rennesøy. The borough council consists of 11 members. The tables below show the current and historical composition of the borough council by political party.

Rennesøy kommunedelsutvalg 2023–2027
Party name (in Norwegian)	Number of representatives
Labour Party (Arbeiderpartiet)	4
Progress Party (Fremskrittspartiet)	2
Conservative Party (Høyre)	2
Industry and Business Party (Industri‑ og Næringspartiet)	1
Centre Party (Senterpartiet)	1
Liberal Party (Venstre)	1
Total number of members:	11
