= Grasholmen =

Island in Stavanger, Norway

Grasholmen Græsholmen (historic)
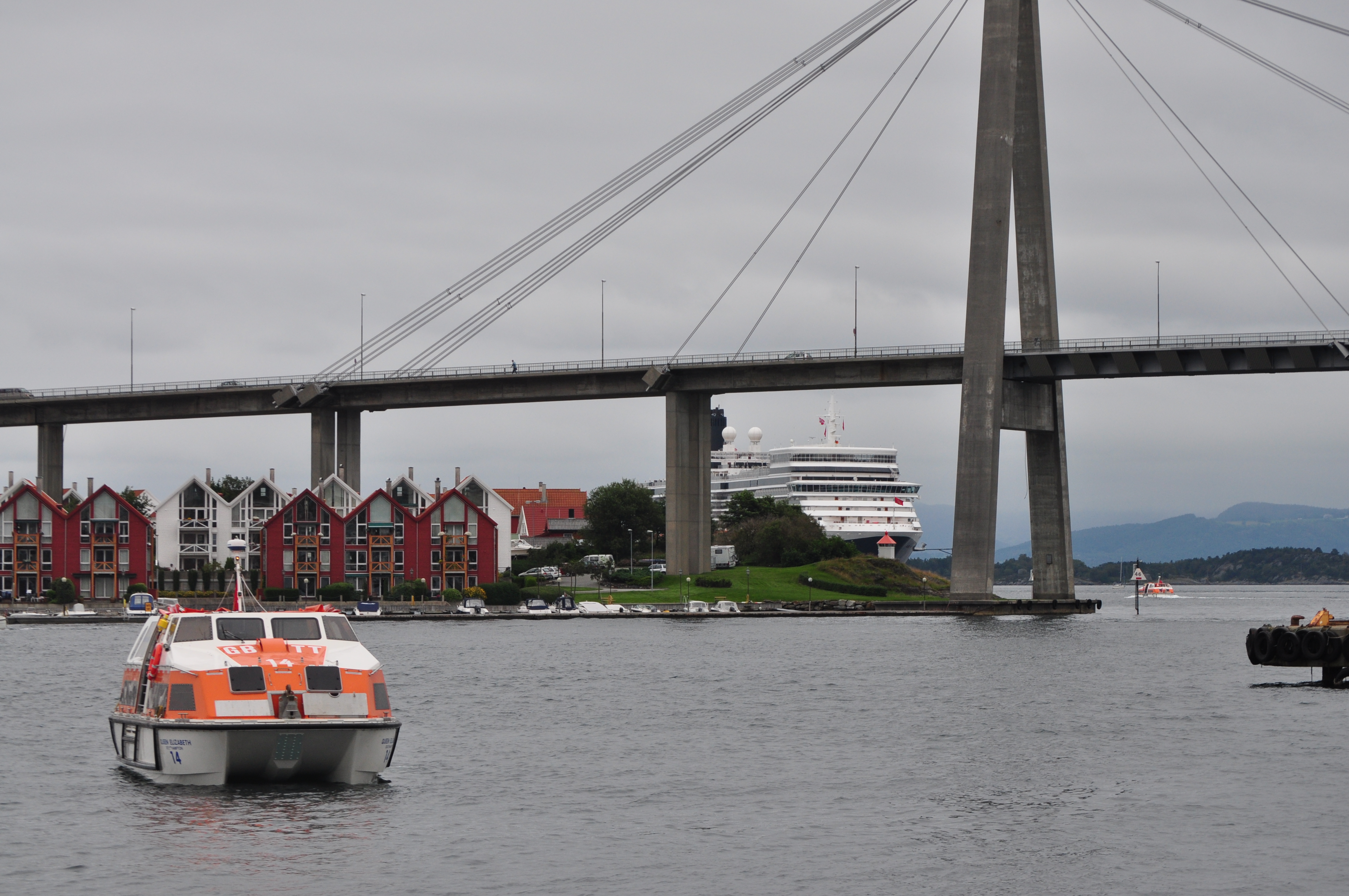
- Grasholmen is on the left of the picture (with the Stavanger City Bridge)
- Interactive map of the island

Geography
- Location: Rogaland, Norway
- Coordinates: 58.9756500°N 5.7470900°E
- Area: 4.48 ha (11.1 acres)
- Length: 325 m (1066 ft)
- Width: 230 m (750 ft)
- Coastline: 900 m (3000 ft)

Administration
- Norway
- County: Rogaland
- Municipality: Stavanger Municipality

Grasholmen is an island in Stavanger Municipality in Rogaland county, Norway. It is located in the Buøy neighborhood in the borough Hundvåg in the city of Stavanger, just north of the city centre. The island is connected to mainland Stavanger via the Stavanger City Bridge and it is connected to the neighboring island of Sølyst by a short bridge.

== History ==
Grasholmen was a part of the old Hetland Municipality until 1 January 1867 when it was transferred to the city of Stavanger.

== See also ==
- List of islands of Norway
