= Sølyst, Stavanger =

Island in Stavanger, Norway

Sølyst
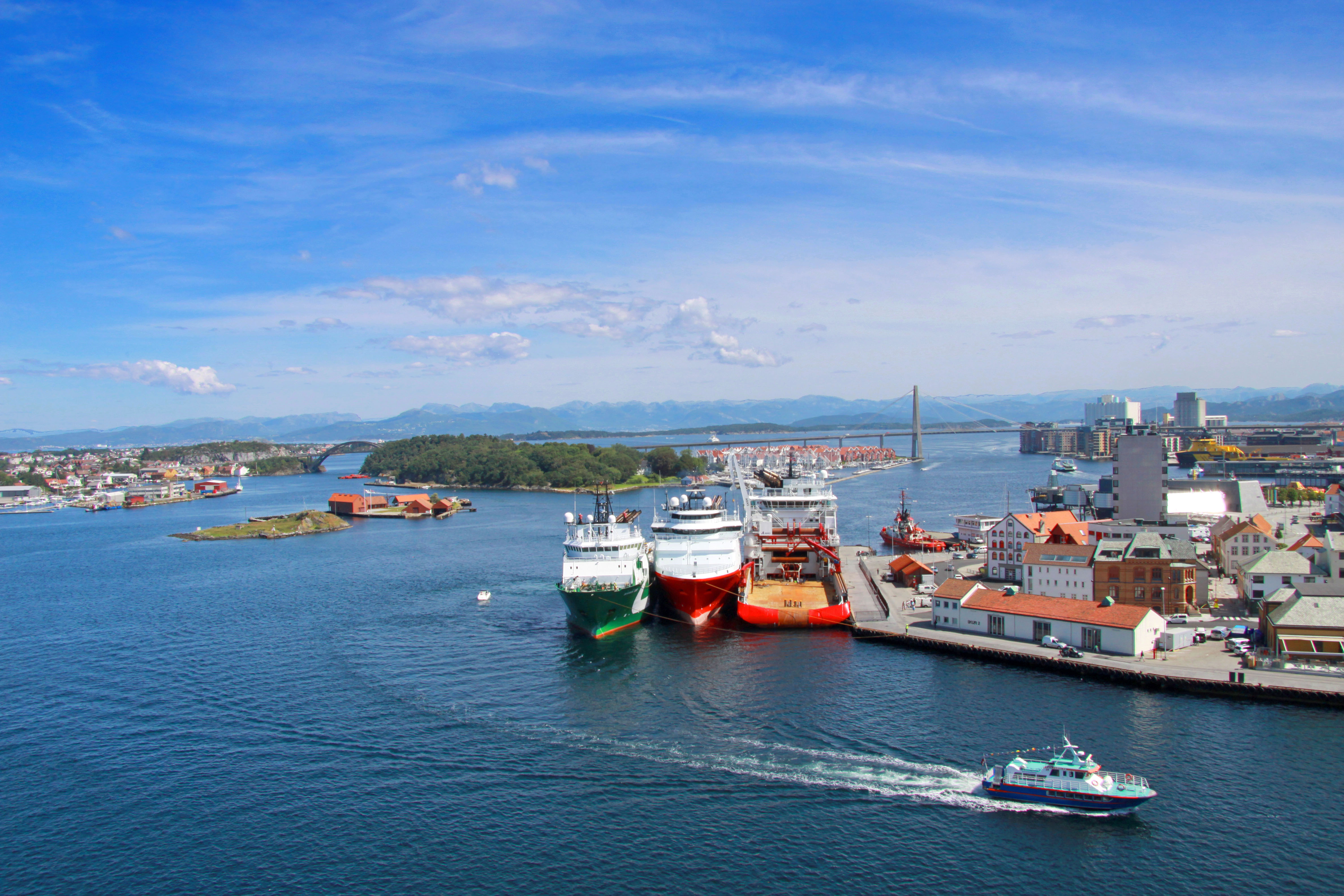
- Sølyst is the heavily treed island in the centre.
- Interactive map of the island

Geography
- Location: Rogaland, Norway
- Coordinates: 58.97776°N 5.74279°E
- Area: 0.13 km^{2} (0.050 sq mi)
- Length: 650 m (2130 ft)
- Width: 300 m (1000 ft)

Administration
- Norway
- County: Rogaland
- Municipality: Stavanger Municipality

Sølyst is an island in Stavanger Municipality in Rogaland county, Norway. The 0.13-square-kilometre (32-acre) island is located in the Buøy neighborhood in the borough of Hundvåg, just north of the centre of the city of Stavanger. It is connected to mainland Stavanger via the island Grasholmen and the Stavanger City Bridge. The island is hilly and rocky as well as heavily treed. Most development is located on the south shore.

== See also ==
- List of islands of Norway
