= Tasta =

Borough in Stavanger, Norway

Tasta bydel
- Borough
- Coat of arms

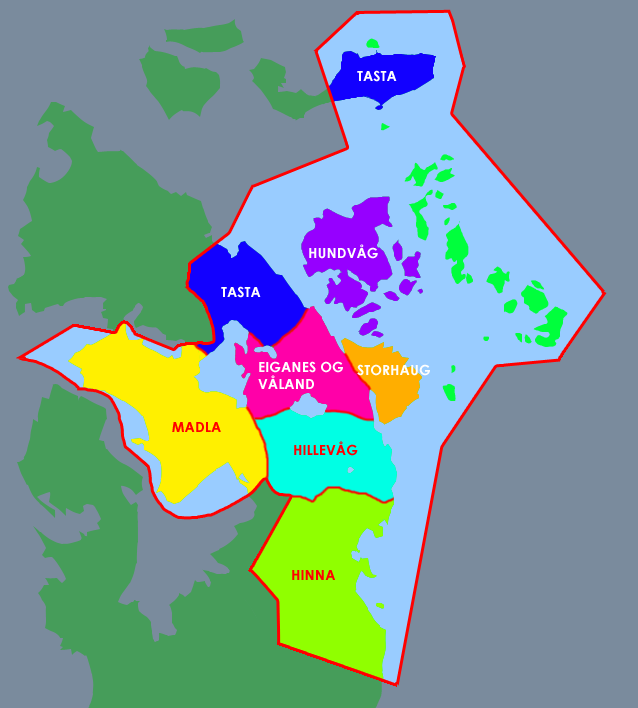
- Location within Stavanger municipality
- Coordinates: 58°58′52″N 05°41′36″E
- Country: Norway
- Region: Western Norway
- County: Rogaland
- District: Jæren
- City: Stavanger

Area
  - Total: 7.19 km^{2} (2.78 sq mi)
- Elevation: 65 m (213 ft)

Population (2025)
  - Total: 16,158
  - Density: 2,250/km^{2} (5,820/sq mi)
- Time zone: UTC+01:00 (CET)
  - Summer (DST): UTC+02:00 (CEST)
- Post Code: 4029 Stavanger

Tasta is a borough of the city of Stavanger which lies in the southwestern part of the large Stavanger Municipality in Rogaland county, Norway. The borough is located in the northern part of the city. The 7.19-square-kilometre (1,780-acre) borough has a population (2025) of 16,158. This gives the borough a population density of 2,250 inhabitants per square kilometre (5,800/sq mi).

Prior to 2020, the eastern half of the island of Åmøy was also included in this borough, but starting in 2020 that area has been part of the borough of Rennesøy.

The local sports clubs are Tasta IL and Vardeneset BK.

== Neighbourhoods ==
Although the borders of "neighbourhoods" (delområder) do not correspond exactly to the borough borders, Tasta roughly consists of the following neighbourhoods: Indre Tasta and Ytre Tasta.

== Politics ==
The borough is not independently self-governing, but it falls under the municipal council for Stavanger Municipality. The municipal council has delegated some responsibilities to the a borough council (Norwegian: bydelsutvalg) for Tasta. The borough council consists of 11 members. The tables below show the current and historical composition of the borough council by political party.

Tasta bydelsutvalg 2023–2027
Party name (in Norwegian)	Number of representatives
Labour Party (Arbeiderpartiet)	3
Progress Party (Fremskrittspartiet)	1
Conservative Party (Høyre)	4
Christian Democratic Party (Kristelig Folkeparti)	1
Centre Party (Senterpartiet)	1
Socialist Left Party (Sosialistisk Venstreparti)	1
Total number of members:	11

Tasta bydelsutvalg 2019–2023
Party name (in Norwegian)	Number of representatives
Labour Party (Arbeiderpartiet)	4
People's Action No to More Road Tolls (Folkeaksjonen nei til mer bompenger)	2
Progress Party (Fremskrittspartiet)	1
Conservative Party (Høyre)	2
Christian Democratic Party (Kristelig Folkeparti)	1
Pensioners' Party (Pensjonistpartiet)	1
Total number of members:	11

Tasta bydelsutvalg 2015–2019
Party name (in Norwegian)	Number of representatives
Labour Party (Arbeiderpartiet)	3
Progress Party (Fremskrittspartiet)	1
Conservative Party (Høyre)	2
Christian Democratic Party (Kristelig Folkeparti)	1
Pensioners' Party (Pensjonistpartiet)	1
Socialist Left Party (Sosialistisk Venstreparti)	1
Liberal Party (Venstre)	1
Local List(s) (Lokale lister)	1
Total number of members:	11
