= Heng, Rogaland =

Island in Rogaland, Norway

Heng
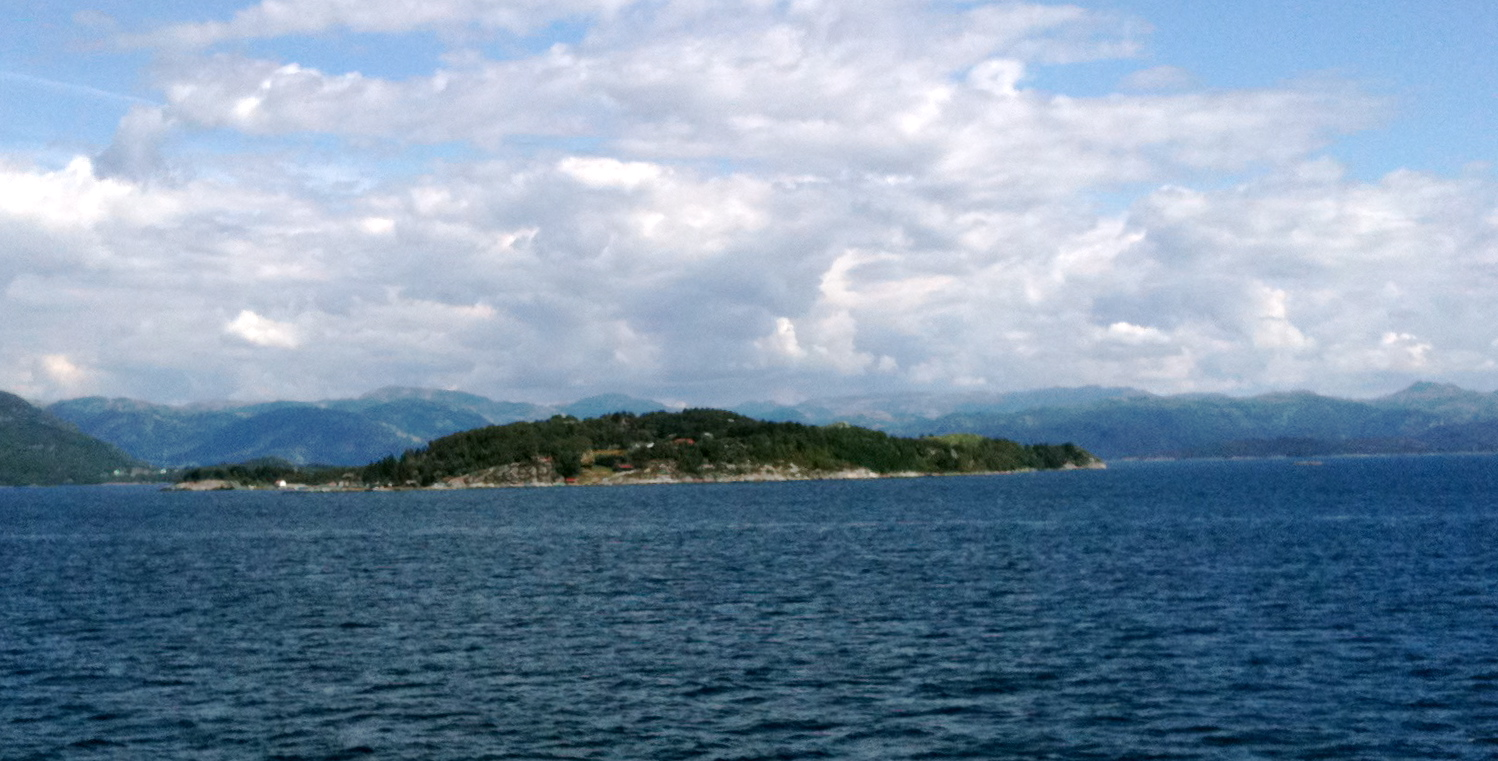
- View of the island
- Interactive map of the island

Geography
- Location: Rogaland, Norway
- Coordinates: 59.02074°N 5.89635°E
- Area: 0.6 km^{2} (0.23 sq mi)
- Length: 1.3 km (0.81 mi)
- Width: 800 m (2600 ft)
- Highest elevation: 53 m (174 ft)
- Highest point: Høgabakka

Administration
- Norway
- County: Rogaland
- Municipality: Strand Municipality

Heng is a small island in the Strand Municipality of Rogaland, Norway. The 0.6-square-kilometre (150-acre) island lies in the Idsefjorden, about 3 kilometres (1.9 mi) southwest of the village of Tau on the mainland. Heng lies roughly halfway between the islands of Hidle and Idse.

== See also ==
- List of islands of Norway
