= Skjæveland =

Skjæveland is a Norwegian surname. Notable people with the surname include:

- Anne Brit Skjæveland (born 1962), Norwegian heptathlete
- Stian Heimlund Skjæveland (born 1973), Norwegian painter and sculptor
