= Idse =

Island in Rogaland, Norway

- Interactive map of the island

Geography
- Location: Rogaland, Norway
- Coordinates: 58.98584°N 5.91665°E
- Area: 4.9 km^{2} (1.9 sq mi)
- Length: 4 km (2.5 mi)
- Width: 1.5 km (0.93 mi)
- Highest elevation: 146 m (479 ft)
- Highest point: Storvarden

Administration
- Norway
- County: Rogaland
- Municipality: Strand Municipality

Demographics
- Population: 116 (2017)
- Pop. density: 24/km^{2} (62/sq mi)

Idse is an island in Strand Municipality in Rogaland county, Norway. The 4.9-square-kilometre (1.9 sq mi) island lies between the Idsefjorden and Høgsfjorden, about 6.5 kilometres (4.0 mi) west of the town of Jørpeland. The island of Idsal lies immediately to the south of Idse, and the island of Heng lies a short distance north. A bridge connects Idse to Idsal, which in turn is connected to the mainland.

== Description ==
There are about 40 farms on the south and east sides of the island, but in recent years there has been a significant decline with only three active dairy farmers remaining. The other farms grow potatoes, tomatoes, cucumbers, strawberries, blueberries, and Christmas trees. The north and west sides of the island are more hilly and forested and that area is populated with many holiday cabins. At Tangane and Kjeksevåg, there are cabins that date back to the 1940s. There were families from the Stavanger area who fled the city during World War II and built cottages on Idse. In recent years, the cottage development has been very expansive, which probably has to do with good location near the cities of Stavanger and Sandnes. There are currently between 300 and 400 condos on the island. Historically, there was a grocery store and post office on the pier at Idse, but both are now closed. In 1917, a telephone line was built between Jørpeland and Idse.

== Notable people ==
- Tore Thorsen Idsøe (born 1796 in Idse), the founder of the renowned butcher shop A. Idsøe Holding. He was married in 1826 with Siri Ådnesdatter Selvik, born 1802 at Selvik in Høle. The business they established in 1828 is currently Stavanger's oldest firm. It is commonly considered one of Stavanger's better butcher shops and meat markets.

== See also ==
- List of islands of Norway
