= Vostervatnet =

Lake in Rogaland, Norway

- Interactive map of Vostervatnet
- Location: Strand Municipality, Rogaland
- Coordinates: 59.09461°N 5.97444°E
- Primary outflows: Fiskåna
- Catchment area: 11.18 km^{2} (4.32 sq mi)
- Basin countries: Norway
- Max. length: 2.9 kilometres (1.8 mi)
- Max. width: 1.4 kilometres (0.87 mi)
- Surface area: 2.62 km^{2} (1.01 sq mi)
- Shore length^{1}: 10.88 kilometres (6.76 mi)
- Surface elevation: 54 metres (177 ft)
- References: NVE
- ^{1} Shore length is not a well-defined measure.

Vostervatnet is a lake in Strand Municipality in Rogaland county, Norway. The 2.62-square-kilometre (1.01 sq mi) lake lies in the northwestern part of the municipality, just south of the Fognafjorden. The village of Tau lies about 3.5 kilometres (2.2 mi) southwest of the lake. The main outflow of the lake is the river Fiskåna, which flows north from the northeastern corner of the lake, down the hill to the village of Fiskå on the shore of the fjord.

== See also ==
- List of lakes in Norway
