= Strand Municipality =

Municipality in Rogaland, Norway

Strand Municipality Strand kommune
- Municipality
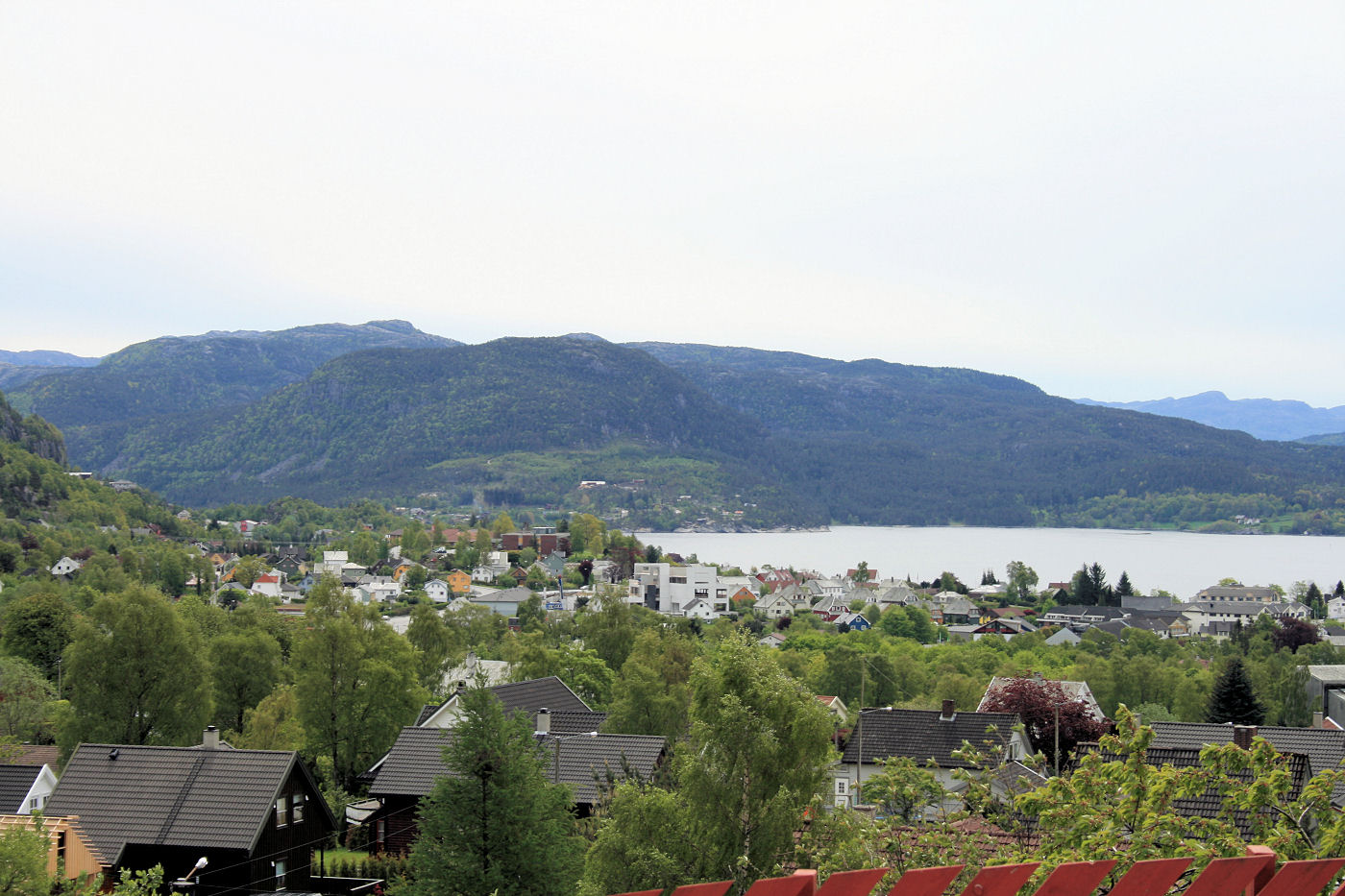
- View of the town of Jørpeland

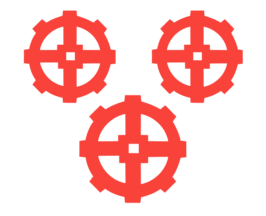
- Flag Coat of arms

- Rogaland within Norway

- Strand within Rogaland
- Coordinates: 59°03′48″N 06°01′40″E
- Country: Norway
- County: Rogaland
- District: Ryfylke
- Established: 1 Jan 1838
  - Created as: Formannskapsdistrikt
- Administrative centre: Jørpeland

Government
  - Mayor (2015): Irene Heng Lauvsnes (H)

Area
  - Total: 261.79 km^{2} (101.08 sq mi)
  - Land: 235.40 km^{2} (90.89 sq mi)
  - Water: 26.39 km^{2} (10.19 sq mi) 10.1%
  - Rank: #278 in Norway
- Highest elevation: 776.46 m (2,547.4 ft)

Population (2025)
  - Total: 13,959
  - Rank: #88 in Norway
  - Density: 53.3/km^{2} (138/sq mi)
  - Change (10 years): ▲ +12%
- Demonym(s): Strandbu; Strandabu

Official language
  - Norwegian form: Neutral
- Time zone: UTC+01:00 (CET)
  - Summer (DST): UTC+02:00 (CEST)
- ISO 3166 code: NO-1130
- Website: Official website

Strand is a municipality in Rogaland county, Norway. It is located in the traditional district of Ryfylke. The administrative centre of the municipality is the town of Jørpeland. The municipality lies across the fjord from the city of Stavanger. The Ryfast tunnel system connects Stavanger and Strand by a very long undersea tunnel.

The villages of Sørskår and Fiskå are located in northern Strand, on the southern shore of the Årdalsfjorden. This area of Strand produces fruit, vegetables, and dairy products. The Fiskå Mølle (Fiskå Mill) is located in Fiskå. The larger village of Tau is located on the western coast of Strand. It is a transportation hub with ferry connections to the city of Stavanger and bus services to nearby Hjelmelandsvågen and deeper into the Ryfylke district. About 10 kilometres (6.2 mi) southeast of Tau is the municipal center of Jørpeland. This town is the largest settlement in Strand with about 7,800 people.

The 261.79-square-kilometre (101.08 sq mi) municipality is the 278th largest by area out of the 357 municipalities in Norway. Strand Municipality is the 88th most populous municipality in Norway with a population of 13,959. The municipality's population density is 53.3 inhabitants per square kilometre (138/sq mi) and its population has increased by 12% over the previous 10-year period.

The cross-country and marathon mountain biker Gunn-Rita Dahle comes from Bjørheimsbygd. She has won a gold medal in the Summer Olympics 2004, in Athens. Holtaheia was the mountain behind Holta farm where 34 school boys, 2 teachers and 3 crew died, when the Cunard Viking flight 'Papa Mike' crashed into the mountain, en route to Stavanger.

== General information ==
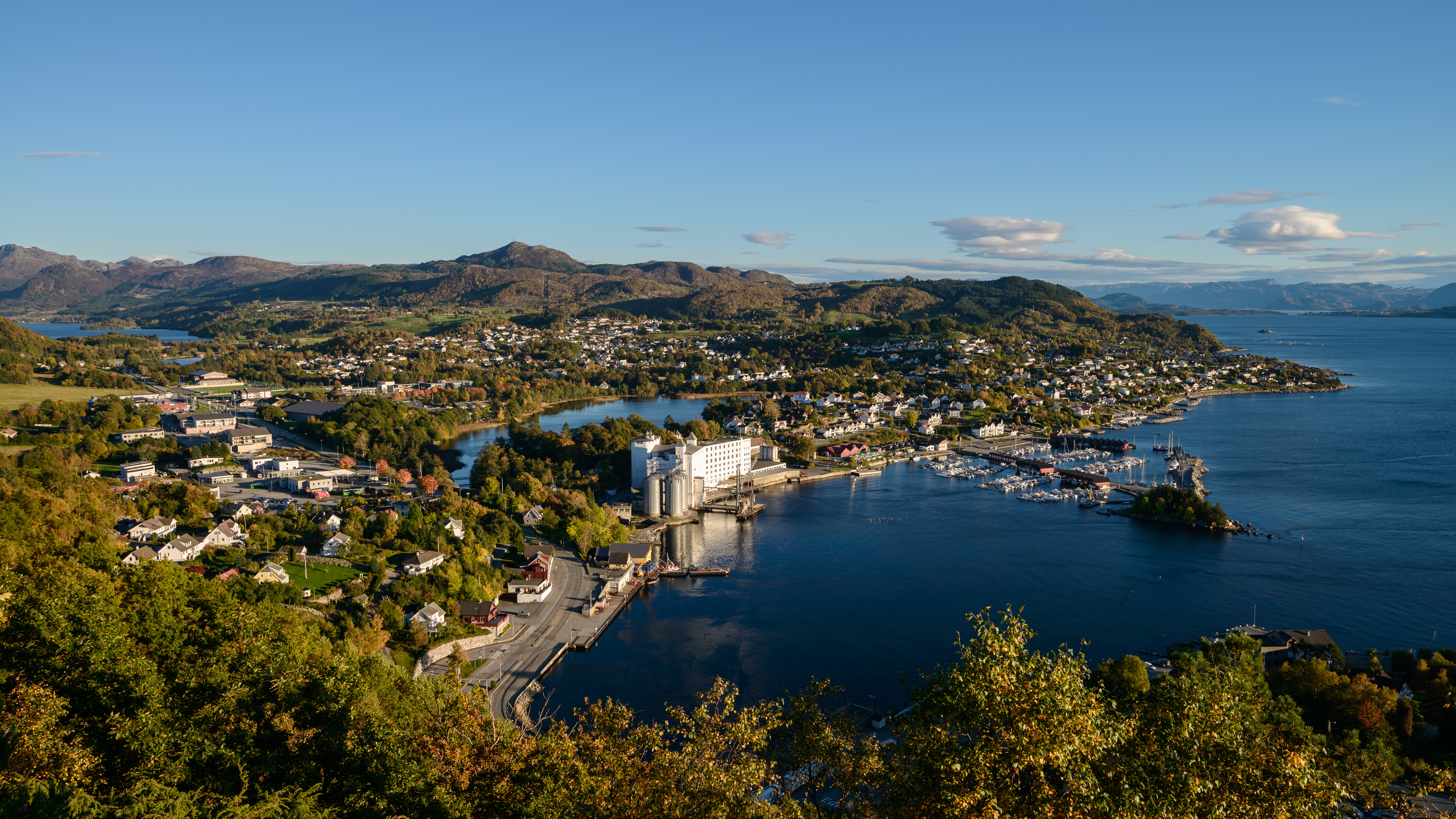
View of the village of Tau

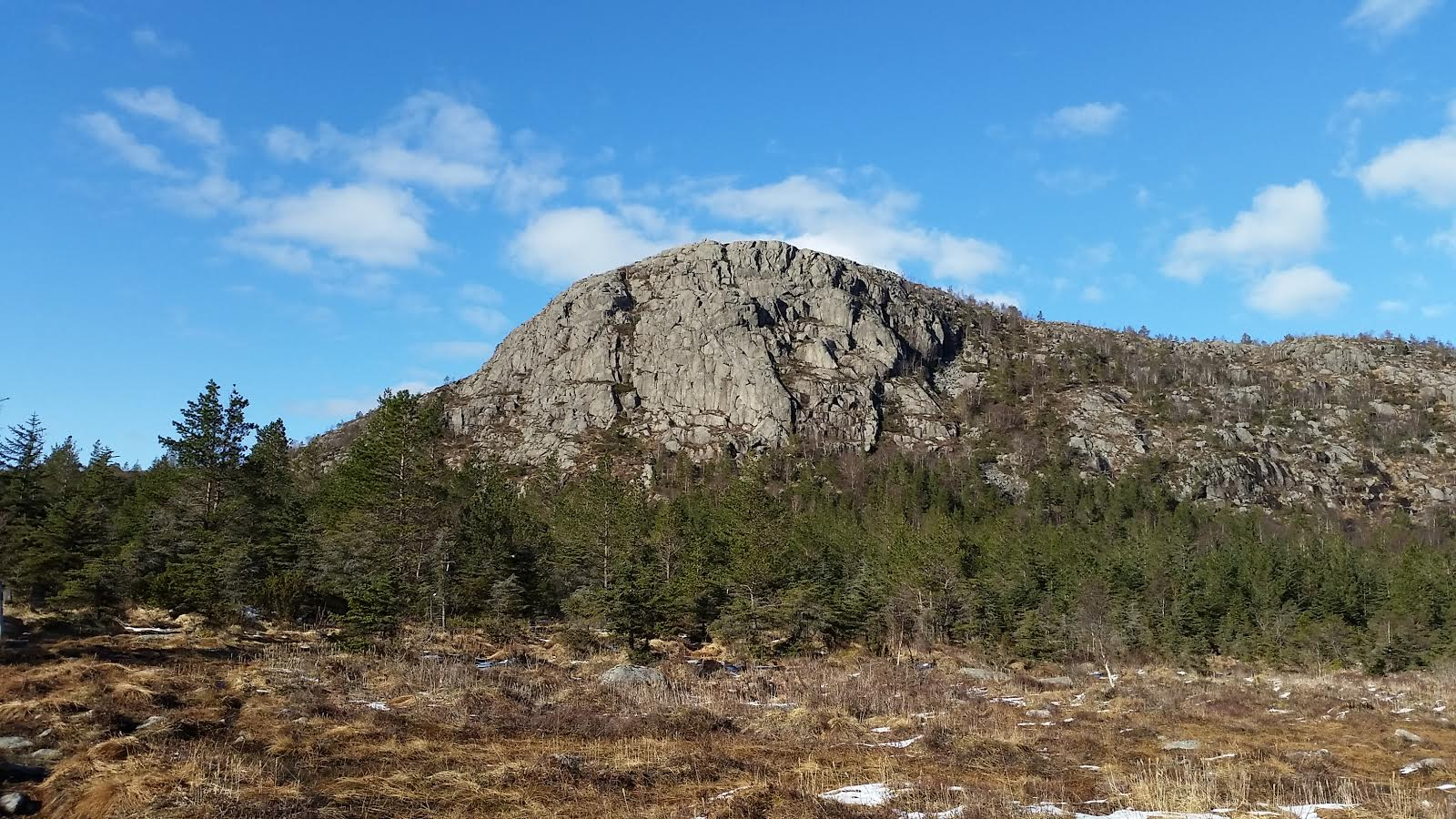
View of the mountain Gramsfjellet

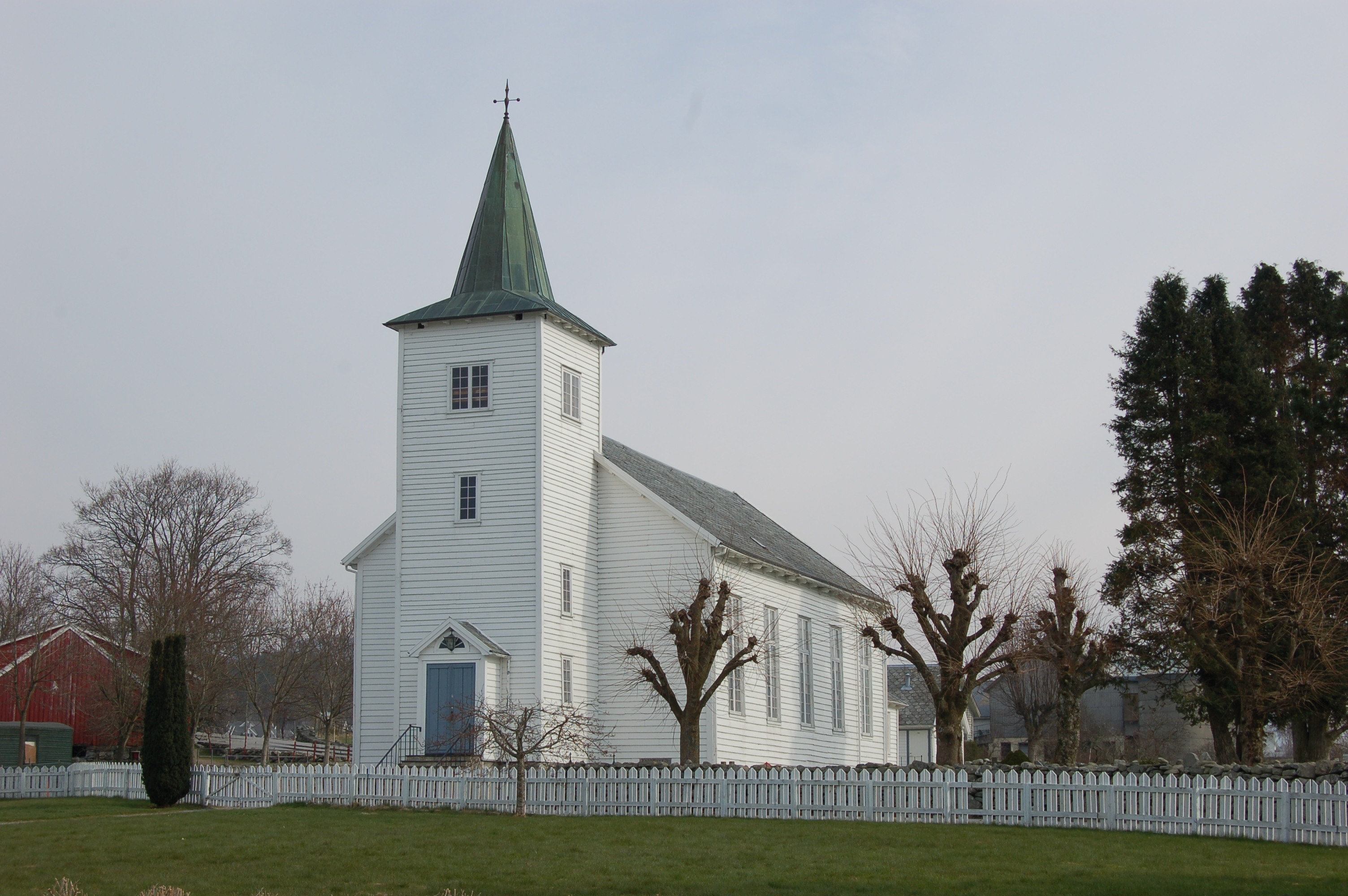
View of Strand Church

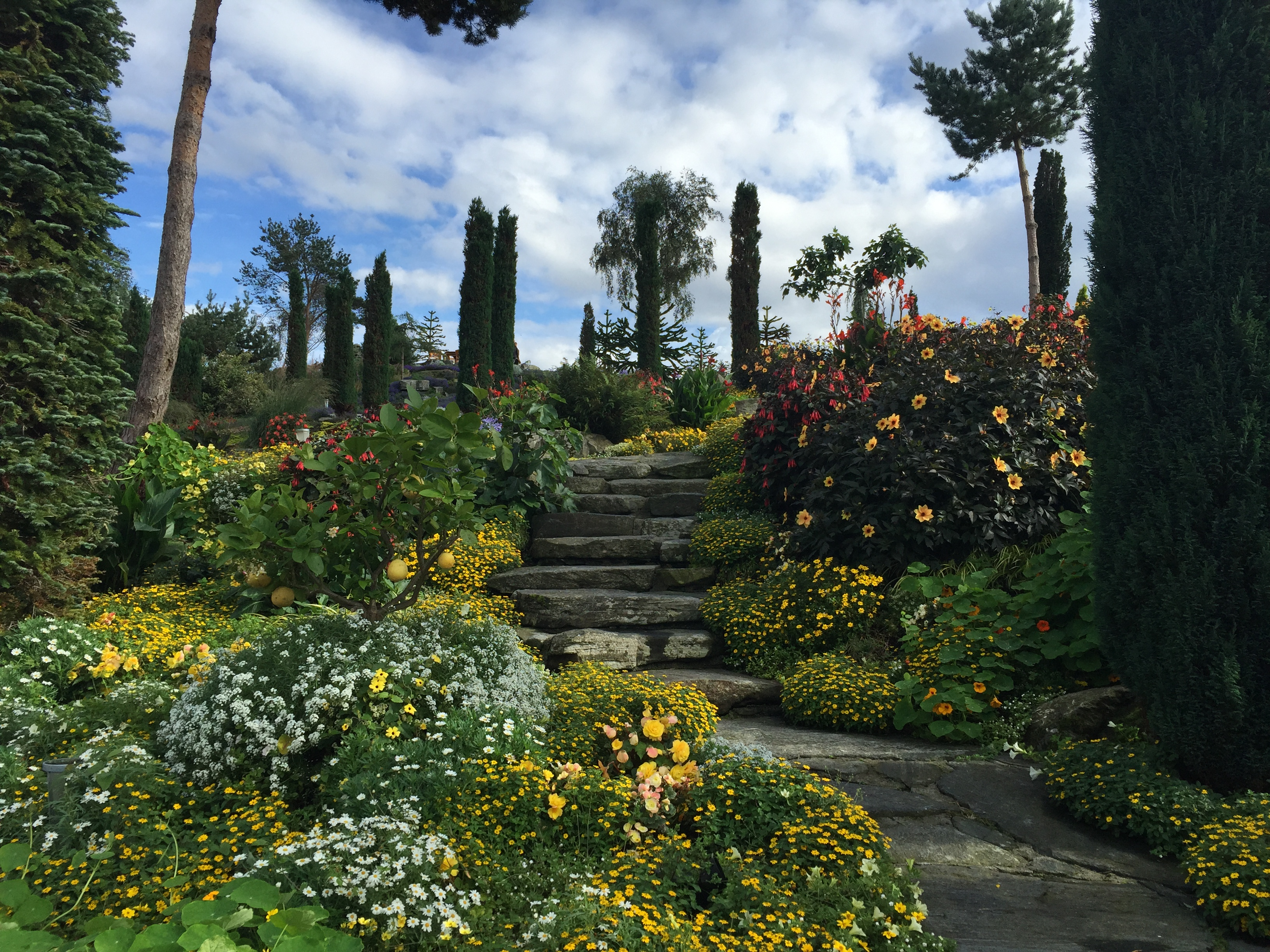
Flor og Fjære a tropical garden on the island of Sør-Hidle

The parish of Strand was established as a municipality on 1 January 1838 (see formannskapsdistrikt law). In 1865, the municipality was divided into two municipalities: the southern district (population: 3,203) became the new Høgsfjord Municipality and the northern district (population: 2,228) remained as a much smaller Strand Municipality.

During the 1960s, there were many municipal mergers across Norway due to the work of the Schei Committee. On 1 January 1965, the Sørskår-Sundgardene area (population: 121) was transferred from the neighboring Årdal Municipality to Strand Municipality.

On 1 January 2020, the northwestern part of Forsand Municipality was transferred to Strand Municipality (while the rest of Forsand Municipality was merged into Sandnes Municipality).

=== Name ===
The municipality (originally the parish) is named after the old Strand farm (Old Norse: Strǫnd) since the first Strand Church was built there. The name is identical to the word strǫnd which means "beach", "shore", or "border", likely due to its location along the fjord.

=== Coat of arms ===
The coat of arms was granted on 25 May 1973. The official blazon is "Argent, three water wheels gules, two over one" (Norwegian: På sølv bunn tre røde vasshjul, to over ett). This means the arms have a field (background) has a tincture of argent which means it is commonly colored white, but if it is made out of metal, then silver is used. The charge is a set of three water wheels (two over one). The wheels are a symbol for the hydropower, which has been of importance to the municipality, first (since 1850) by using watermills to grind corn and grains, and now using modern hydro-electric plants. The arms were designed by Odd Fjordholm. The municipal flag has the same design as the coat of arms.

=== Churches ===
The Church of Norway has two parishes (sokn) within Strand Municipality. It is part of the Ryfylke prosti (deanery) in the Diocese of Stavanger.

Churches in Strand Municipality
Parish (sokn)	Church name	Location of the church	Year built
Jørpeland	Jørpeland Church	Jørpeland	1969
Strand	Strand Church	Tau	1874

== Geography ==
Strand Municipality is located on the mainland of Norway, on the south side of the vast Boknafjorden. The highest point in the municipality is the 776.46-metre (2,547.4 ft) tall mountain Heiahornet, about 8 kilometres (5.0 mi) east of Jørpeland, near the border with Hjelmeland Municipality. The small islands of Idse and Idsal are located in the southwest part of Strand, between the Høgsfjorden and Idsefjorden. The small islands of Heng and Sør-Hidle lie in the large fjord between Strand Municipality and Stavanger Municipality. The lakes Tysdalsvatnet, Bjørheimsvatnet, and Vostervatnet are all located in Strand. Hjelmeland Municipality lies to the north and east and Sandnes Municipality is to the south. The archipelago containing the islands of Stavanger Municipality lie to the northwest.

== Government ==
Strand Municipality is responsible for primary education (through 10th grade), outpatient health services, senior citizen services, welfare and other social services, zoning, economic development, and municipal roads and utilities. The municipality is governed by a municipal council of directly elected representatives. The mayor is indirectly elected by a vote of the municipal council. The municipality is under the jurisdiction of the Sør-Rogaland District Court and the Gulating Court of Appeal.

=== Municipal council ===
The municipal council (Kommunestyre) of Strand Municipality is made up of 29 representatives that are elected to four-year terms. The tables below show the current and historical composition of the council by political party.

Strand kommunestyre 2023–2027
Party name (in Norwegian)	Number of representatives
Labour Party (Arbeiderpartiet)	4
Progress Party (Fremskrittspartiet)	3
Conservative Party (Høyre)	9
Industry and Business Party (Industri‑ og Næringspartiet)	3
Christian Democratic Party (Kristelig Folkeparti)	4
Red Party (Rødt)	1
Centre Party (Senterpartiet)	3
Socialist Left Party (Sosialistisk Venstreparti)	1
Liberal Party (Venstre)	1
Total number of members:	29

Strand kommunestyre 2019–2023
Party name (in Norwegian)	Number of representatives
Labour Party (Arbeiderpartiet)	4
Progress Party (Fremskrittspartiet)	2
Green Party (Miljøpartiet De Grønne)	1
Conservative Party (Høyre)	10
Christian Democratic Party (Kristelig Folkeparti)	4
Red Party (Rødt)	1
Centre Party (Senterpartiet)	4
Socialist Left Party (Sosialistisk Venstreparti)	1
Liberal Party (Venstre)	1
Local list for Tau and northern areas (Bygdeliste for Tau og nordbygda)	1
Total number of members:	29

Strand kommunestyre 2015–2019
Party name (in Norwegian)	Number of representatives
Labour Party (Arbeiderpartiet)	7
Progress Party (Fremskrittspartiet)	3
Green Party (Miljøpartiet De Grønne)	1
Conservative Party (Høyre)	7
Christian Democratic Party (Kristelig Folkeparti)	6
Centre Party (Senterpartiet)	2
Socialist Left Party (Sosialistisk Venstreparti)	1
Liberal Party (Venstre)	1
Local list for Tau and northern areas (Bygdeliste for Tau og nordbygda)	1
Total number of members:	29

Strand kommunestyre 2011–2015
Party name (in Norwegian)	Number of representatives
Labour Party (Arbeiderpartiet)	12
Progress Party (Fremskrittspartiet)	3
Conservative Party (Høyre)	5
Christian Democratic Party (Kristelig Folkeparti)	5
Centre Party (Senterpartiet)	2
Socialist Left Party (Sosialistisk Venstreparti)	1
Liberal Party (Venstre)	1
Total number of members:	29

Strand kommunestyre 2007–2011
Party name (in Norwegian)	Number of representatives
Labour Party (Arbeiderpartiet)	7
Progress Party (Fremskrittspartiet)	5
Conservative Party (Høyre)	4
Christian Democratic Party (Kristelig Folkeparti)	7
Centre Party (Senterpartiet)	3
Socialist Left Party (Sosialistisk Venstreparti)	2
Liberal Party (Venstre)	1
Total number of members:	29

Strand kommunestyre 2003–2007
Party name (in Norwegian)	Number of representatives
Labour Party (Arbeiderpartiet)	8
Progress Party (Fremskrittspartiet)	5
Conservative Party (Høyre)	4
Christian Democratic Party (Kristelig Folkeparti)	6
Centre Party (Senterpartiet)	3
Socialist Left Party (Sosialistisk Venstreparti)	2
Liberal Party (Venstre)	1
Total number of members:	29

Strand kommunestyre 1999–2003
Party name (in Norwegian)	Number of representatives
Labour Party (Arbeiderpartiet)	9
Progress Party (Fremskrittspartiet)	2
Conservative Party (Høyre)	5
Christian Democratic Party (Kristelig Folkeparti)	6
Centre Party (Senterpartiet)	2
Socialist Left Party (Sosialistisk Venstreparti)	1
Liberal Party (Venstre)	1
Cross-party common list (Tverrpolitisk samlingsliste)	3
Total number of members:	29

Strand kommunestyre 1995–1999
Party name (in Norwegian)	Number of representatives
Labour Party (Arbeiderpartiet)	9
Conservative Party (Høyre)	5
Christian Democratic Party (Kristelig Folkeparti)	7
Centre Party (Senterpartiet)	3
Socialist Left Party (Sosialistisk Venstreparti)	1
Liberal Party (Venstre)	2
Cross-party common list (Tverrpolitisk samlingsliste)	8
Total number of members:	35

Strand kommunestyre 1991–1995
Party name (in Norwegian)	Number of representatives
Labour Party (Arbeiderpartiet)	7
Conservative Party (Høyre)	4
Christian Democratic Party (Kristelig Folkeparti)	6
Centre Party (Senterpartiet)	3
Socialist Left Party (Sosialistisk Venstreparti)	3
Liberal Party (Venstre)	2
Cross-party common list (Tverrpolitisk samlingsliste)	10
Total number of members:	35

Strand kommunestyre 1987–1991
Party name (in Norwegian)	Number of representatives
Labour Party (Arbeiderpartiet)	10
Conservative Party (Høyre)	7
Christian Democratic Party (Kristelig Folkeparti)	8
Centre Party (Senterpartiet)	2
Socialist Left Party (Sosialistisk Venstreparti)	3
Liberal Party (Venstre)	2
Cross-party common list (Tverrpolitisk samlingsliste)	3
Total number of members:	35

Strand kommunestyre 1983–1987
Party name (in Norwegian)	Number of representatives
Labour Party (Arbeiderpartiet)	10
Progress Party (Fremskrittspartiet)	2
Conservative Party (Høyre)	7
Christian Democratic Party (Kristelig Folkeparti)	7
Liberal People's Party (Liberale Folkepartiet)	1
Centre Party (Senterpartiet)	2
Socialist Left Party (Sosialistisk Venstreparti)	2
Liberal Party (Venstre)	2
Cross-party common list (Tverrpolitisk samlingsliste)	2
Total number of members:	35

Strand kommunestyre 1979–1983
Party name (in Norwegian)	Number of representatives
Labour Party (Arbeiderpartiet)	6
Conservative Party (Høyre)	6
Christian Democratic Party (Kristelig Folkeparti)	7
New People's Party (Nye Folkepartiet)	2
Centre Party (Senterpartiet)	2
Socialist Left Party (Sosialistisk Venstreparti)	1
Liberal Party (Venstre)	2
Cross-party common list (Tverrpolitisk samlingsliste)	3
Total number of members:	29

Strand kommunestyre 1975–1979
Party name (in Norwegian)	Number of representatives
Labour Party (Arbeiderpartiet)	5
Conservative Party (Høyre)	2
Christian Democratic Party (Kristelig Folkeparti)	8
New People's Party (Nye Folkepartiet)	4
Centre Party (Senterpartiet)	2
Socialist Left Party (Sosialistisk Venstreparti)	1
Liberal Party (Venstre)	1
Cross-party common list (Tverrpolitisk samlingsliste)	6
Total number of members:	29

Strand kommunestyre 1971–1975
Party name (in Norwegian)	Number of representatives
Labour Party (Arbeiderpartiet)	7
Conservative Party (Høyre)	2
Christian Democratic Party (Kristelig Folkeparti)	6
Centre Party (Senterpartiet)	7
Liberal Party (Venstre)	6
Socialist common list (Venstresosialistiske felleslister)	1
Total number of members:	29

Strand kommunestyre 1967–1971
Party name (in Norwegian)	Number of representatives
Labour Party (Arbeiderpartiet)	8
Conservative Party (Høyre)	2
Christian Democratic Party (Kristelig Folkeparti)	4
Centre Party (Senterpartiet)	5
Socialist People's Party (Sosialistisk Folkeparti)	1
Liberal Party (Venstre)	6
Local List(s) (Lokale lister)	3
Total number of members:	29

Strand kommunestyre 1963–1967
Party name (in Norwegian)	Number of representatives
Labour Party (Arbeiderpartiet)	7
Conservative Party (Høyre)	2
Christian Democratic Party (Kristelig Folkeparti)	4
Liberal Party (Venstre)	6
Joint List(s) of Non-Socialist Parties (Borgerlige Felleslister)	6
Local List(s) (Lokale lister)	4
Total number of members:	29

Strand herredsstyre 1959–1963
Party name (in Norwegian)	Number of representatives
Labour Party (Arbeiderpartiet)	8
Conservative Party (Høyre)	2
Christian Democratic Party (Kristelig Folkeparti)	3
Joint List(s) of Non-Socialist Parties (Borgerlige Felleslister)	8
Total number of members:	21

Strand herredsstyre 1955–1959
Party name (in Norwegian)	Number of representatives
Labour Party (Arbeiderpartiet)	6
Christian Democratic Party (Kristelig Folkeparti)	5
List of workers, fishermen, and small farmholders (Arbeidere, fiskere, småbrukere liste)	1
Joint List(s) of Non-Socialist Parties (Borgerlige Felleslister)	9
Total number of members:	21

Strand herredsstyre 1951–1955
Party name (in Norwegian)	Number of representatives
Labour Party (Arbeiderpartiet)	6
Christian Democratic Party (Kristelig Folkeparti)	4
Joint List(s) of Non-Socialist Parties (Borgerlige Felleslister)	8
Local List(s) (Lokale lister)	2
Total number of members:	20

Strand herredsstyre 1947–1951
Party name (in Norwegian)	Number of representatives
Labour Party (Arbeiderpartiet)	5
Christian Democratic Party (Kristelig Folkeparti)	4
Joint List(s) of Non-Socialist Parties (Borgerlige Felleslister)	7
Total number of members:	16

Strand herredsstyre 1945–1947
Party name (in Norwegian)	Number of representatives
Labour Party (Arbeiderpartiet)	4
Christian Democratic Party (Kristelig Folkeparti)	1
Local List(s) (Lokale lister)	11
Total number of members:	16

Strand herredsstyre 1937–1941*
Party name (in Norwegian)	Number of representatives
Labour Party (Arbeiderpartiet)	1
Farmers' Party (Bondepartiet)	8
List of workers, fishermen, and small farmholders (Arbeidere, fiskere, småbrukere liste)	3
Local List(s) (Lokale lister)	4
Total number of members:	16
Note: Due to the German occupation of Norway during World War II, no elections were held for new municipal councils until after the war ended in 1945.

=== Mayors ===
The mayor (Norwegian: ordfører) of Strand Municipality is the political leader of the municipality and the chairperson of the municipal council. The following people have held this position:

- 1838–1841: Omund Olsen Fossand
- 1842–1843: Ole Thorsen Barkved
- 1844–1847: Thore Thorsen Botne
- 1848–1849: Thore Thorsen Svinnæs
- 1850–1857: Ole Thorsen Barkved
- 1858–1861: Thore Thorsen Svinnæs
- 1862–1869: Ole Thorsen Barkved
- 1870–1873: Thore Thorsen Svinnæs
- 1874–1881: Rev. Fredrik Møllerop Lied
- 1882–1900: Rasmus Fjelde
- 1900–1910: Josef Foss
- 1911–1916: Thore Thoresen Svines
- 1917–1919: Torbjørn T. Elleflaadt
- 1920–1922: Josef Foss
- 1923–1925: Ivar Strand
- 1926–1928: Josef Foss
- 1929–1934: Torfinn Meltveit
- 1935–1945: Ivar Eie
- 1945–1945: Josef A. Ramsfjell
- 1946–1947: Markus Foss
- 1948–1951: Ivar Eie
- 1952–1955: Josef A. Ramsfjell
- 1955–1961: Knut A. Jøssang
- 1961–1965: Odd Vasstveit
- 1966–1967: Martin Voll Tungland
- 1967–1975: Magnus R. Karlsen (V)
- 1975–1979: Ragnar Mugås (KrF)
- 1979–1983: Gunnar Fatland (H)
- 1983–1986: Harald Moe (V)
- 1986–1991: Odd William Bøe (Ap)
- 1991–1995: Tormod E. Nag (KrF)
- 1995–1999: Jan Langvik (H)
- 1999–2007: Odd William Bøe (Ap)
- 2007–2015: Helge Steinsvåg (Ap)
- 2015–present: Irene Heng Lauvsnes (H)

== Industry ==
Scana Steel Stavanger AS is the largest company in Strand. Main activities include producing special steel alloys and casting for the shipping and oil/gas industry. Propellers of RMS Queen Mary 2 were made here. There are about 220 workers.

Comrod Communication ASA is a manufacturer of radio communication aerials. It makes deliveries to fisheries, shipping, oil and gas companies, and military defence. There are about 65 employees.

== Culture ==
There are several festivals in Strand, including Ryfylke Ungdomsfestival (Ryfylke Youth Festival), Strandadagane (Strand Days) and Melting Pot (art seminar, mostly making decorative art out of scrap-iron). The annual race between Jørpeland and Tau, Strandamila, is an event which attracts hundreds of people. The race is along the highway, either by bike or on foot. Strand also has many sport facilities. There are a lot of football pitches spread around the municipality, as well as local fitness centres. Tau also has two tennis courts, a beach-volleyball field, and a basketball court, as well as Ryfylkehallen, the largest indoor football arena in the county of Rogaland.

Strand experienced a strong influx of newcomers from Stavanger and Jæren starting in the late 1970s. The original social fabric was divided into factory workers at the iron mill, farmers, and the strong Lutheran tradition. The divides were in many ways exclusive, and only limited movement between the social groups was seen. In later years these divides have become significantly weaker.

== Notable people ==
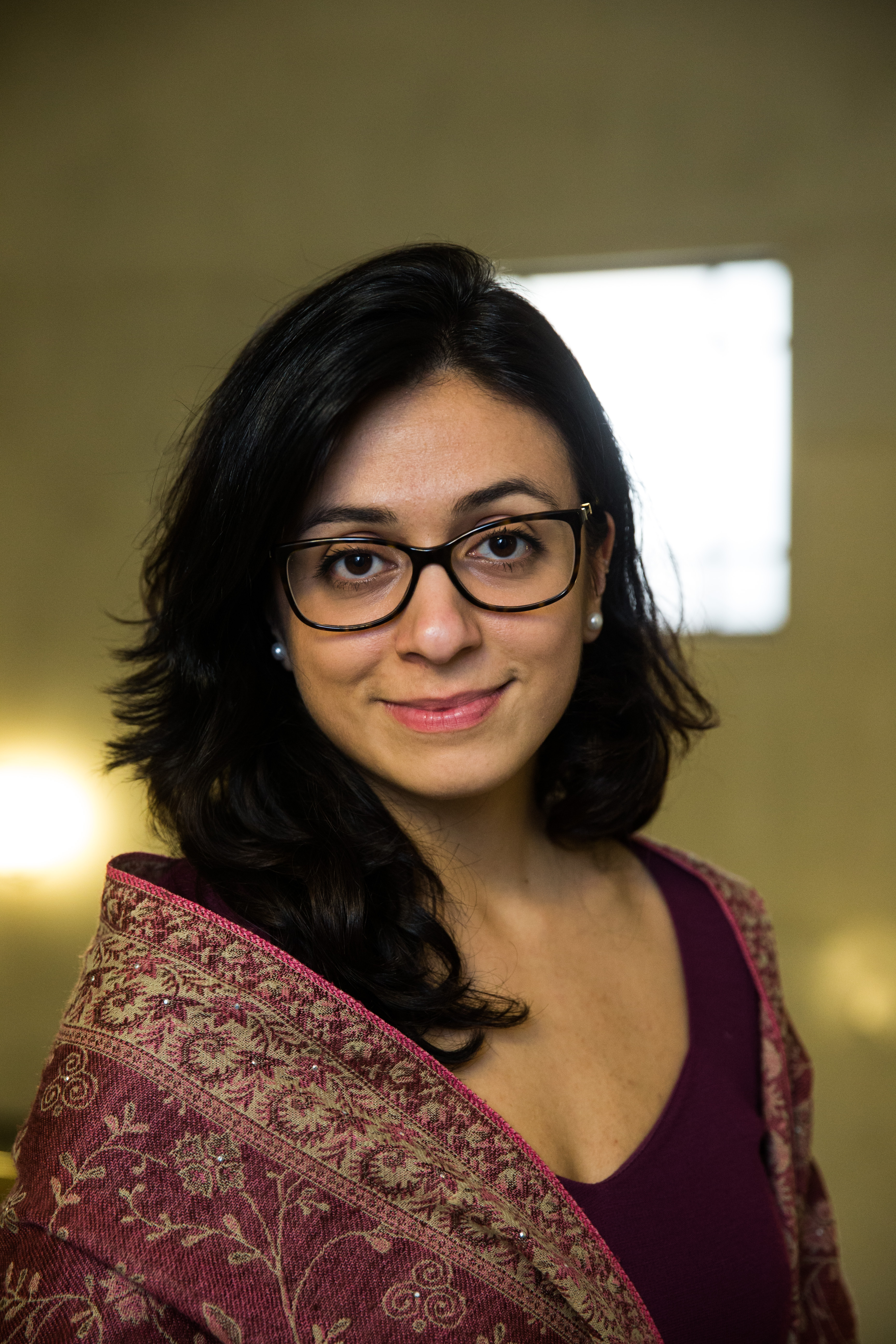
Hadia Tajik, 2012

- Claus Winter Hjelm (1797 in Strand – 1871), a legal scholar, judge, and Supreme Court Justice from 1843
- Aage Schavland (1806 in Strand – 1876), a priest and politician who was mayor of Herøy in 1840s/50s and mayor of Trondheim in 1865
- John Moses (1885 in Strand – 1945), the 22nd Governor of North Dakota, 1939 to 1945
- Stein Rønning (1965 in Strand – 2008), a karate master who won the 1990 World Karate Championships
- Silje Vige (born 1976 in Jørpeland), a singer
- Hugo Mikal Skår (born 1978), an actor
- Hadia Tajik (born 1983 in Bjørheimsbygd), a Pakistani-Norwegian jurist, journalist, and politician
- Johnny Lodden (born 1985 in Jørpeland), a professional online poker player
- Pål Fjelde (born 1994 in Jørpeland), a footballer with over 100 club caps
- Mathias Bringaker (born 1997), a footballer with over 100 club caps who was brought up in Jørpeland
