= Electrocompaniet =

Norwegian audio hardware company

- Type: Private
- Industry: Consumer electronics
- Founded: 1973; 53 years ago
- Founders: Per Abrahamsen; Svein Erik Børja
- Headquarters: Tau, Norway
- Key people: Bjørn Kindingstad (CEO)
- Products: Hi-fi; Loudspeakers
- Number of employees: 5 (2026)
- Website: electrocompaniet.com

Electrocompaniet is a Norwegian manufacturer of audio products basing their ideal sound not on technical measurements and theory but on getting a sound most true to the live listening experience. Their amplifiers have been used in several Recording Studios, including Abbey Road Studios.

== History ==
Electrocompaniet was established in 1973 by Per Abrahamsen and Svein Erik Børja. Their idea was to create a transistor amplifier that is better sounding than transistor amplifiers did at the time. Abrahamsen and Børja based their circuits on research done by Matti Otala of Tampere University of Technology. Their first finished product was a 25 Watt power amplifier named "The 2 Channel Audio Power Amplifier", also called "The Otala Amplifier". They continued development on the product. In 1976 a respected high end audio magazine at the time "The Audio Critic" reviewed the amplifier and wrote: "Audio freaks – eat your hearts out. This is the world’s best-sounding amplifier." In 1991 Michael Jackson's producer Bruce Swedien was contacted by Nils Bjarne Kvam, one of the biggest producers in Norway at the time, was told about the amplifiers of Electrocompaniet, which interested Swedien. The amplifier was packed and shipped to the US in September 1991. Bruce was working with the last mix to Jackson's Dangerous. He loved the amplifiers and wanted to use it on the album, but the album was almost done, and he would then have to remaster it all over again since the difference was so big. Swedien therefore used the amplifiers on the next albums. He used it for the first time with Sergio Mendez, and with Jackson in January 1995. His next two albums, History and Invincible, were both mastered with the amplifiers, and both albums thanked Electrocompaniet with logo on its covers.

In 2004, the company went bankrupt, but in 2007 the company was bought up by Norwegian company "Westcontrol". All production was moved to Tau, near Stavanger. Today they are represented in over 50 countries worldwide. In June 2018, Electrocompaniet filed for bankruptcy for the second time. The company was then acquired by a group of investors who resumed operations of the company.

== Notable products ==
=== The 2 channel audio power amplifier ===
The 2 channel audio power amplifier was the first amplifier Electrocompaniet produced. It was a 2x25 Watt Stereo power amplifier based on the works of Dr. Matti Otala on TIM-free transistor design. It has been updated and re-produced several times. Since it was only 2x25 Watt Electrocompaniet designed bigger amplifiers with more wattage but with the same sound characteristics.

=== NEMO AW 600 monaural class A reference amplifier ===
The AW600 NEMO monaural class A reference amplifier by Electrocompaniet is used in listening and reference studios across the world. It is often coupled with the Bowers & Wilkins Nautilus reference, and the 800 Diamond series loudspeakers.

Electrocompaniet maded this amplifier to be matched with the Nautilus loudspeakers. At the time of realization for Nautilus, there were few power amplifiers capable of delivering the power that they required. Electrocompaniet named their new mono amplifier after Nemo, the fictional captain of the Nautilus submarine from the 1870 novel Twenty Thousand Leagues Under the Seas.

NEMO was at some point used in Abbey Road Studios.

=== EMC 1 CD player ===
In 1998, Electrocompaniet produced a CD player called the EMC 1. Since then, Electrocompaniet has produced several updates of the EMC. The MKV features 24-bit upsampling, SACD, an electromechanical cancellation system, fully balanced D/A converter, separate transformers and PCB's.

=== ECG 1 turntable ===
Electrocompaniet developed their first turntable in late 2014. The turntable uses a Jelco tonearm, and a custom-made cartridge by pick-up manufacturer Soundsmith. The plinth is made of three layers, consisting of two layers acrylic, and one aluminum layer in the middle. This so-called "sandwich" construction isolates the plinth from vibrations and resonance. It has a motor control that can play 33 1/3, 45 and 78 RPM records.
