= Idsal =

Island in Rogaland, Norway

- Interactive map of the island

Geography
- Location: Rogaland, Norway
- Coordinates: 58.98118°N 5.98388°E
- Area: 3.1 km^{2} (1.2 sq mi)
- Length: 2.7 km (1.68 mi)
- Width: 1.6 km (0.99 mi)
- Highest elevation: 69 m (226 ft)
- Highest point: Vardafjellet

Administration
- Norway
- County: Rogaland
- Municipality: Strand Municipality

Demographics
- Population: 12
- Pop. density: 3.9/km^{2} (10.1/sq mi)

Idsal is an island in Strand Municipality in Rogaland county, Norway. The 3.1-square-kilometre (1.2 sq mi) island lies directly between the island of Idse and the mainland with the Idsefjorden and the Høgsfjorden on either side of the island. There are short bridge on the east and west sides of Idsal that connect it to the mainland and to Idse, respectively. Most of the island's 12 permanent residents live on the southwestern side of the island, however there are many holiday cottages located all over the island.

== See also ==
- List of islands of Norway
