= Irene Heng Lauvsnes =

Norwegian politician (born 1968)

Deputy Member of the Storting
- Incumbent
- Assumed office 1 October 2021
- Deputising for: Tina Bru (2021)
- Constituency: Rogaland

Mayor of Strand Municipality
- Incumbent
- Assumed office October 2015
- Deputy: Astrid Norland; Bjørn Aril Veland; Bjørg Tryland
- Preceded by: Helge Steinsvåg

Personal details
- Born: 17 April 1968 (age 57)
- Party: Conservative
- Occupation: Aqua culture engineer Politician

Irene Heng Lauvsnes (born 17 April 1968) is a Norwegian engineer specialising in aqua culture, and politician for the Conservative Party. She has served as mayor of Strand Municipality since 2015 and a deputy member of parliament for Rogaland since 2021.

== Political career ==
=== Local politics ===
She has been a member of the municipal council of Strand Municipality since 2011 and was elected as the first female mayor of Strand Municipality in 2015. She was re-elected in 2019 and 2023. The Conservatives with her at the helm, held the mayoralty since she became mayor, while the Christian Democrats held the deputy mayoralty. However, this changed when her second deputy mayor, Bjørn Aril Veland, changed his party allegiance to the Conservatives in 2022 prior to becoming acting mayor in a brief absence for Lauvsnes. Despite his change of parties, Veland stayed on as deputy mayor until the end of the term.

=== Parliament ===
Lauvsnes was elected as a deputy representative to the Storting from Rogaland for the term 2021–2025. She briefly deputised for Tina Bru who was an outgoing member of Solberg's Cabinet between 1 and 14 October 2021.

== Civic career ==
Prior to becoming mayor, she was a sales director in the fish feed company Skretting. She has also been deputy leader of the Norwegian Seafood Research Fund.

She is an aqua culture engineer by education.
