= Tina Bru =

Norwegian politician (born 1986)

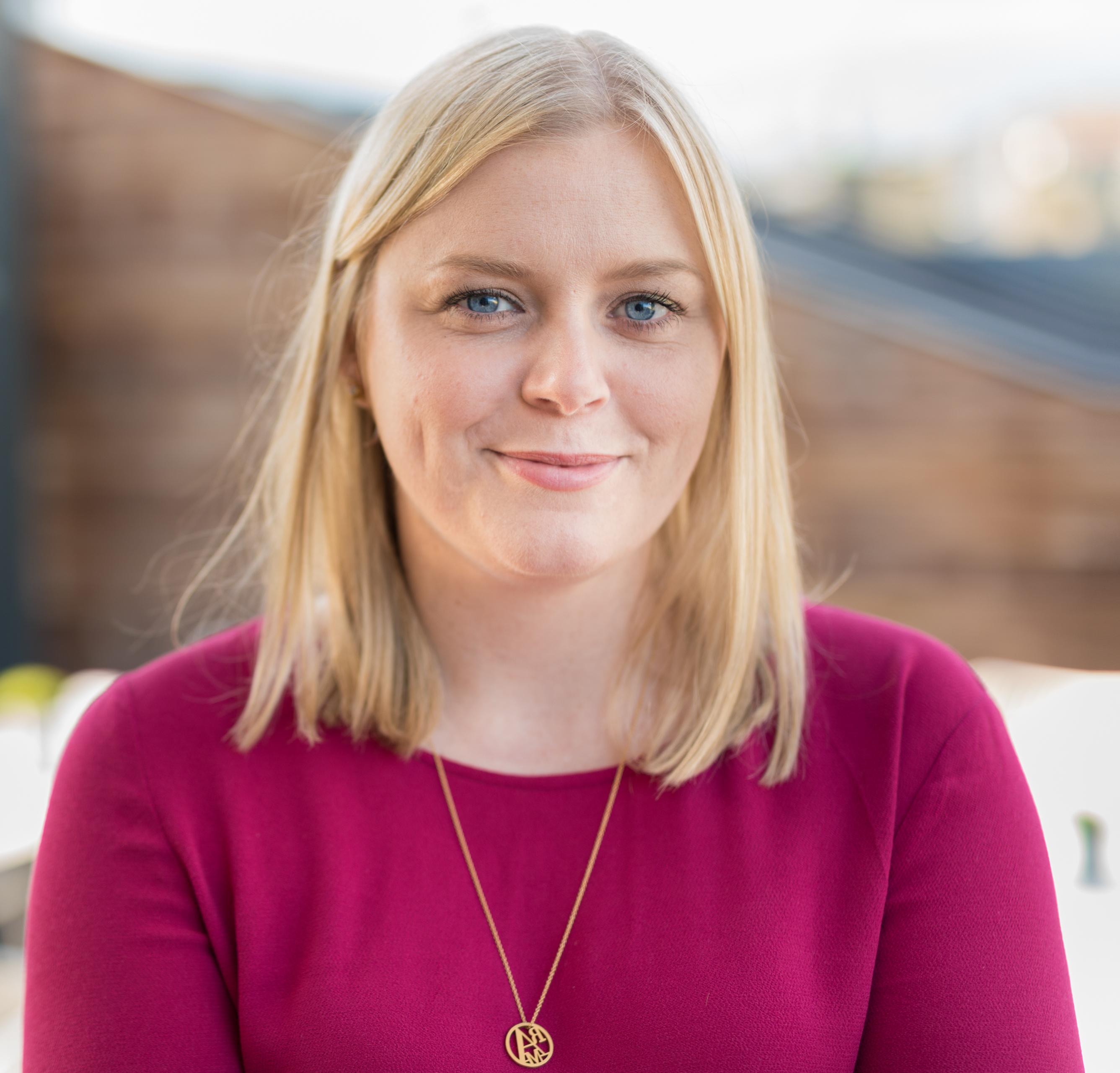
- Bru in 2017

Second Deputy Leader of the Conservative Party
- In office 11 September 2020 – 14 February 2026
- Leader: Erna Solberg
- Preceded by: Bent Høie
- Succeeded by: Ola Svenneby

Minister of Petroleum and Energy
- In office 24 January 2020 – 14 October 2021
- Prime Minister: Erna Solberg
- Preceded by: Sylvi Listhaug
- Succeeded by: Marte Mjøs Persen

Member of the Storting
- In office 1 October 2013 – 30 September 2025
- Deputy: Aase Simonsen; Irene Heng Lauvsnes
- Constituency: Rogaland

Personal details
- Born: 18 April 1986 (age 40) Moss, Østfold, Norway
- Party: Conservative
- Spouse: Thomas André Samuelsen
- Children: 2
- Education: University of Stavanger; BI Norwegian Business School
- Occupation: Politician

Tina Bru (born 18 April 1986) is a Norwegian politician for the Conservative Party. From 2020 to 2021, she served as the Minister of Petroleum and Energy. She was a member of the Storting for Rogaland from 2013 to 2025 and was a member of the Standing Committee on Energy and the Environment. She was reelected to the Storting for the period 2017–2021, and continued as a member of the Standing Committee on Energy and the Environment.

== Political career ==
=== Parliament ===
Bru was elected to the Storting for Rogaland in the 2013 election and was re-elected in 2017 and 2021.

On 13 September 2022, she announced that she had received a notification of a tax slap from the Norwegian Tax Administration. The Tax Administration believed that she didn't pay enough rent to her parents while she resided in Stavanger, and thus did not meet the so-called additional cost condition. Bru herself believed that she fulfilled this, and also pointed out that she asked for personal guidance from the Administration in 2020 in an attempt to make sure that things were right.

In April 2024, she announced that she wouldn't be seeking re-election at the 2025 election, citing family reasons.

=== Minister of Petroleum and Energy ===
Bru was appointed Minister of Petroleum and Energy following the Progress Party's withdrawal from government in January 2020. There had been huge expectations for her appointment and it was well received in the petroleum and energy branch.

==== 2020 ====
While attending the opening of and offshore wind facility in the Rogaland province, she was heckled by protesters and blocked from entering a meeting. To the press, she expressed discomfort about the situation. She took to Facebook to note what she had been called during the opening. The general secretary for Motvind Norge, Rune Haaland, expressed dismay at the way protesters had treated Bru. He stated that most protesters only use their free will of democracy to protest, while also pointing out that the protesters in Haugesund where not a part of his organisation.

After an article was published by Aftenbladet and E24 about what if petroleum were to disappear, Bru was questioned by the Socialist Left Party in July 2020, if the article reflected reality. Bru responded by saying that "the Petroleum Directorate's task is to spread facts and knowledge about Norwegian oil fields and our petroleum and gas resources".

In October 2020, Bru presented negative numbers to the Storting regarding the Martin Linge oil field. She expressed that the field needs to be completed and be ready for production.

==== 2021 ====
In February 2021, following revelations that Equinor had hidden partners and owners in Angola in 2011, Bru was questioned by the Storting Control and Constitution Committee. She stated that she expects Equinor to put up to the highest standards and not to make the same mistake again.

In March, Bru revealed that she had tested positive for COVID-19, and reported that she was feeling relatively fine.

After revelations about personal attacks and ridicule against Green Party politician Lan Marie Berg, Bru took to Facebook defending Berg and stated she had had enough. In a further interview with NRK, Bru stated she felt it was "like she received both racism and hate for being a woman".

In July 2021, following criticism by Green Party politician Rasmus Hansson about Erna Solberg, Bru and the majority in the Storting to be directly responsible for the heatwave and fires in British Columbia, Canada, Bru rejected the criticism and called it "embarrassing". To Dagbladet, she said "these are known tones from the Green Party. Whenever a big natural disaster strikes somewhere in the world, they almost always try to hold us personally accountable. That falls within its own unreasonableness".

At the end of August, Bru alongside minister of finance Jan Tore Sanner, announced at a press conference a proposal to reorganise the petroleum tax. The proposal received mixed reception from the opposition, with the Socialist Left and Red Party praising the proposal, while the Progress Party, Centre Party, and Green Party criticised it, with the Greens notably calling it "a desperate attempt" right before the election. The Centre Party called it a stunt. Bru specified that the proposal was not a step to liquidate the petroleum energy.

Following the cabinet's defeat at the 2021 election, she was succeeded by Marte Mjøs Persen on 14 October.

=== Party politics ===
In February 2020, after being suggested as new deputy leader of the party, she was subsequently installed as second deputy leader, succeeding outgoing Bent Høie who was nominated to be county governor of Rogaland commencing in 2021. She was subsequently elected second deputy leader in September 2020 unopposed.

After the Solberg cabinet's defeat in the 2021 election, Bru was selected as the party's spokesperson for financial policy.

Following the 2025 parliamentary election, Bru announced that she would not seek re-election as deputy leader at the next party convention. She was succeeded by Ola Svenneby at the party's extrodinary convention on 14 February 2026.

== Civic career ==
In November 2025, it was announced that Bru would join the consulting and communications firm First House and would be heading their newly established office in Stavanger.

== Early and personal life ==
Bru was born in Moss on 18 April 1986, a daughter of Sigve Bru and Sissel Skalstad Bru. She has a bachelor's degree in management, with further specialisation in change management.

Bru is married to Thomas André Samuelsen from Stavanger, and they two children, one son and one daughter.
