= Jørpeland Church =

Church in Rogaland, Norway

- Jørpeland kirke
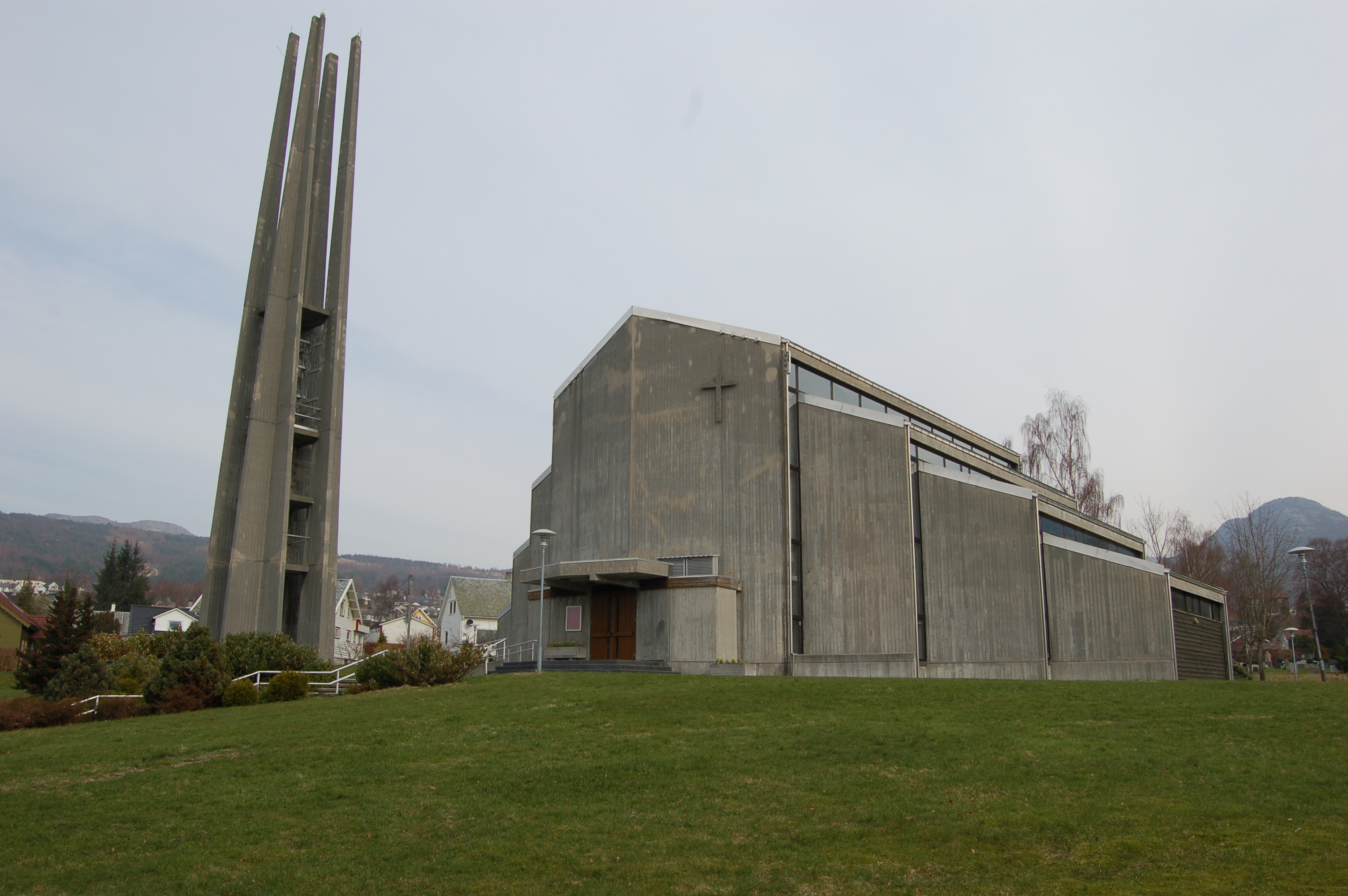
- View of the church
- Jørpeland Church
- 59.026362°N 06.039438°E
- Location: Strand Municipality, Rogaland
- Country: Norway
- Denomination: Church of Norway
- Churchmanship: Evangelical Lutheran

History
- Status: Parish church
- Founded: 1969
- Consecrated: 1969

Architecture
- Functional status: Active
- Architect(s): Turid and Kristen; Bernhoff Evensen
- Architectural type: Rectangular
- Completed: 1969

Specifications
- Capacity: 450
- Materials: Concrete

Administration
- Diocese: Stavanger bispedømme
- Deanery: Ryfylke prosti
- Parish: Jørpeland
- Norwegian Cultural Heritage Site
- Type: Church
- Status: Not protected
- ID: 84751

Jørpeland Church (Norwegian: Jørpeland kirke) is a parish church of the Church of Norway in Strand Municipality in Rogaland county, Norway. It is located in the town of Jørpeland. It is the church for the Jørpeland parish which is part of the Ryfylke prosti (deanery) in the Diocese of Stavanger. The large, gray, concrete church was built in a rectangular design in 1969 using designs by the architects Turid and Kristen Bernhoff Evensen. The church seats about 450 people.

== See also ==
- List of churches in Rogaland
