= Strand Church (Rogaland) =

Church in Rogaland, Norway

- Strand kirke
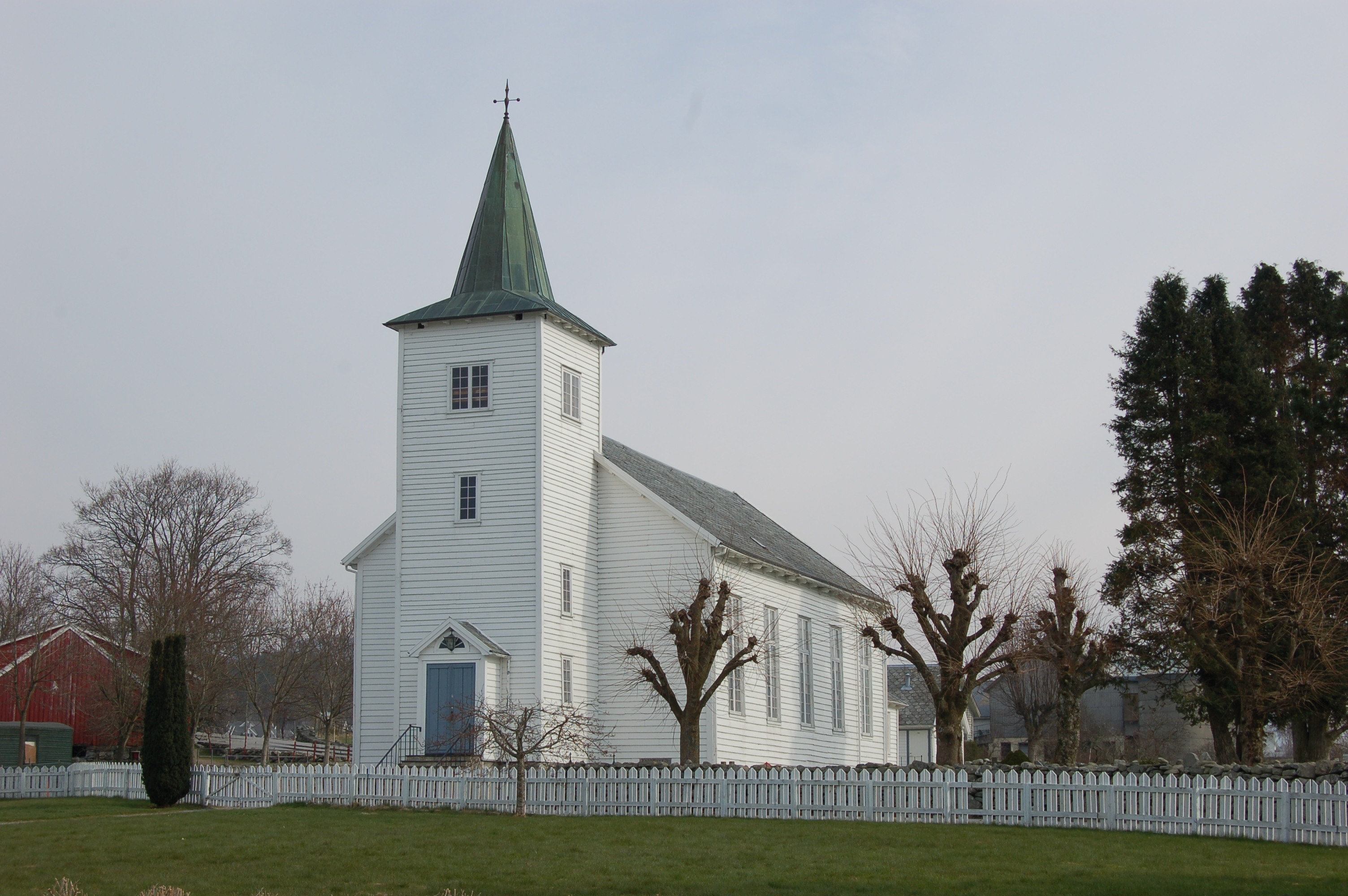
- View of the church Credit: Rune Sattler
- Strand Church
- 59.051204°N 5.93082°E
- Location: Strand Municipality, Rogaland
- Country: Norway
- Denomination: Church of Norway
- Churchmanship: Evangelical Lutheran

History
- Status: Parish church
- Founded: 12th century
- Consecrated: 1874

Architecture
- Functional status: Active
- Architect: Fritz von der Lippe
- Architectural type: Long church
- Completed: 1874

Specifications
- Capacity: 284
- Materials: Wood

Administration
- Diocese: Stavanger bispedømme
- Deanery: Ryfylke prosti
- Parish: Strand
- Norwegian Cultural Heritage Site
- Type: Church
- Status: Protected
- ID: 85590

Strand Church (Norwegian: Strand kirke) is a parish church of the Church of Norway in Strand Municipality in Rogaland county, Norway. It is located in the village of Tau. It is the church for the Strand parish which is part of the Ryfylke prosti (deanery) in the Diocese of Stavanger. The white, wooden church was built in a long church design in 1874 using designs by the architect Fritz von der Lippe. The church seats about 284 people.

== History ==
The earliest existing historical records of the church date back to the year 1280, but the church was not new that year. The church was probably a stave church, possibly from the 12th century. In 1626, the old church was torn down and replaced with a new timber-framed building on roughly the same location. The new church was not fully completed until 1635.

In 1814, this church served as an election church (Norwegian: valgkirke). Together with more than 300 other parish churches across Norway, it was a polling station for elections to the 1814 Norwegian Constituent Assembly which wrote the Constitution of Norway. This was Norway's first national elections. Each church parish was a constituency that elected people called "electors" who later met together in each county to elect the representatives for the assembly that was to meet at Eidsvoll Manor later that year.

In 1874, a new church was built immediately to the north of the old church. After the new church was completed, the old church was torn down.

== See also ==
- List of churches in Rogaland
