= Jørpeland =

Town in Rogaland, Norway

- Town/City
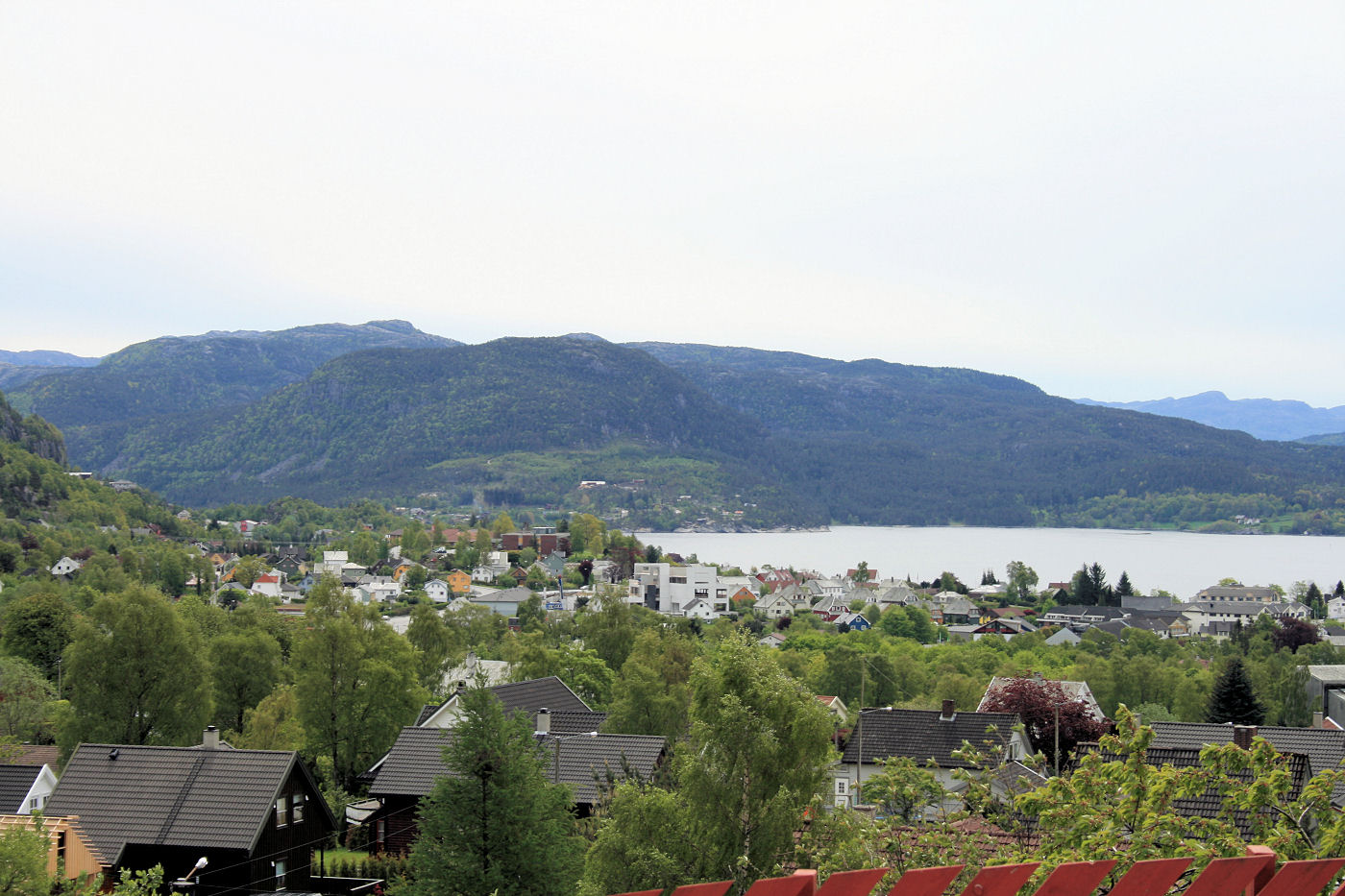
- View of the town
- Interactive map of Jørpeland
- Coordinates: 59.0225°N 6.04082°E
- Country: Norway
- Region: Western Norway
- County: Rogaland
- District: Ryfylke
- Municipality: Strand Municipality
- Established as
- Town (By): 1 Apr 1998

Area
  - Total: 4.16 km^{2} (1.61 sq mi)
- Elevation: 22 m (72 ft)

Population (2025)
  - Total: 7,815
  - Density: 1,879/km^{2} (4,870/sq mi)
- Demonym(s): Jørpelandsbu; Jørpelending
- Time zone: UTC+01:00 (CET)
  - Summer (DST): UTC+02:00 (CEST)
- Post Code: 4100 Jørpeland

Jørpeland is the administrative centre of Strand Municipality in Rogaland county, Norway. The town is located on the western coast of the mainland, along the shore of the Idsefjorden, about 20 kilometres (12 mi) northeast of the city of Stavanger. It sits along the Norwegian National Road 13 a short distance southeast of the village of Tau where the Ryfast tunnel has its eastern entrance.

The 4.16-square-kilometre (1,030-acre) town has a population (2025) of 7,815 and a population density of 1,879 inhabitants per square kilometre (4,870/sq mi). Jørpeland is also known as "Pulpit Rock City", because Jørpeland is nearest city to the Preikestolen, which attracts tourists from all over the world. The Preikestolen is a huge cliff overlooking the Lysefjorden and it sits about 10 kilometres (6.2 mi) southeast of Jørpeland.

Jørpeland became designated as a town by the municipal council on 1 April 1998. Prior to that time it was simply considered a very large village. Jørpeland is divided into nine boroughs: Leite, Barka, Tungland, Barkved, Jøssang, Førland, Langeland, Grønnevoll, and Fjelde. The river Jørpelandsåna runs through the town before emptying into the fjord on the south side of the town.

== Name ==
The name "Jørpeland" is composed of the slightly changed Old Norse word jarpr, which translates to brown, and the word land (thus it means "brown land"). The reason for this name is that historically, the river Jørpelandsånå used to turn brown during times of flood.

== Attractions ==
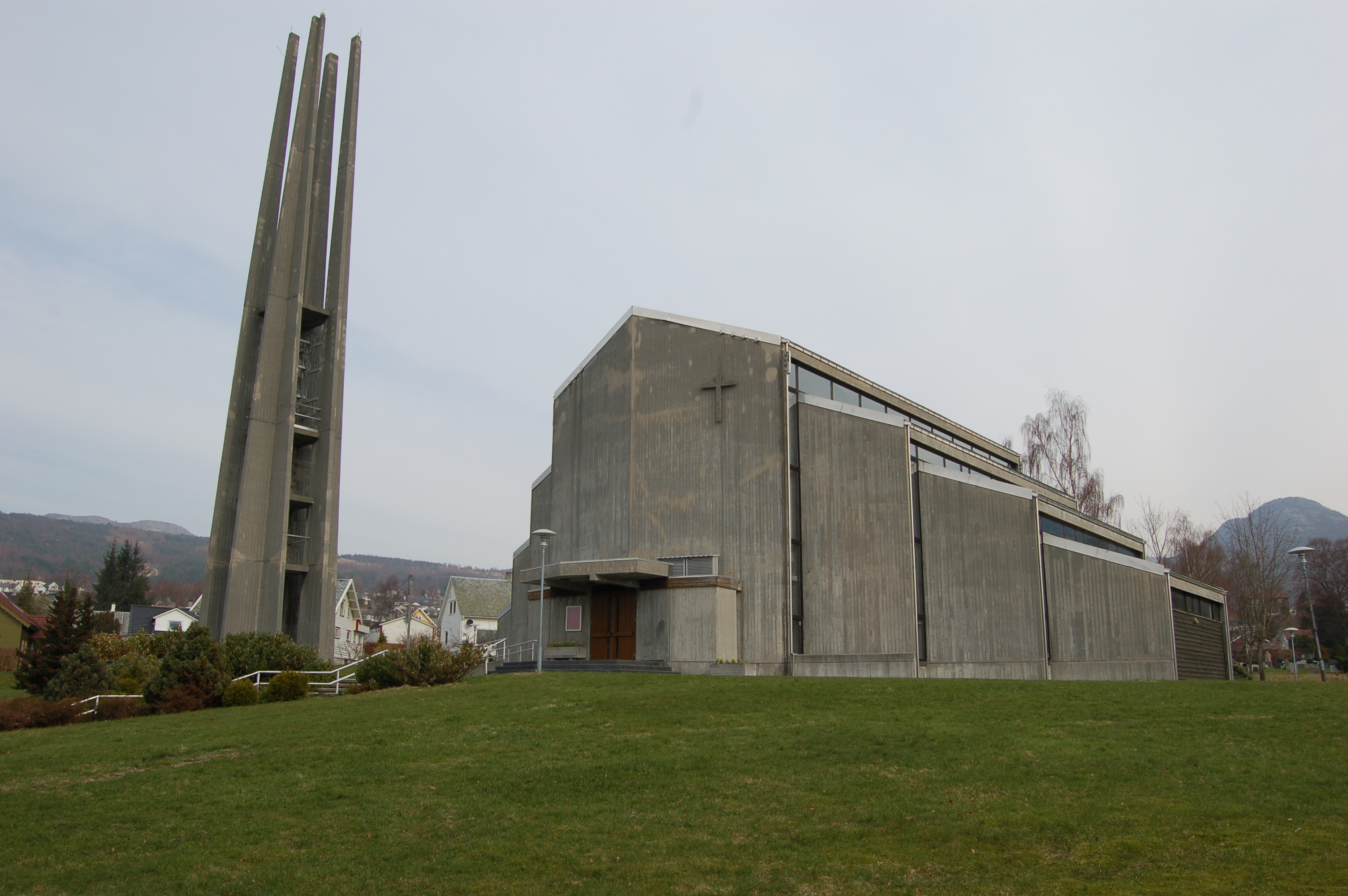
Jørpeland Church

Jørpelands Brug is a building from 1883, which is located at Vågen in Jørpeland. Jørpeland also has tourist information, liquor store, a cultural center (Torghuset), a harbor in Vågen with boardwalk, various restaurants and grocery stores. Jørpeland also has a golf course just outside the city, as well some campsites. The Jørpeland Church was built in 1969 to serve the town.

The town also has some good beaches for swimming and sport activities. Most notably are Barkavika and Nordlys. Barkavika has its own two Volleyball courts, while Nordlys has a playground right next to the beach.

Jørpeland has an annual tradition festival, called Strandadagene, arranged first weekend of June.

== Geography ==
The town of Jørpeland is in a very mountainous area. It is surrounded by many mountains including:

- Preikestolen (Elevation: 604 metres [1,982 ft])
- Heiahornet (Elevation: 774 metres [2,539 ft])
- Hamrane (Elevation: 401 metres [1,316 ft])
- Langaberg (Elevation: 455 metres [1,493 ft])
- Gramsfjellet (Elevation: 505 metres [1,657 ft])
- Krokarfjellet (Elevation: 466 metres [1,529 ft])
- Førlandsåsen (Elevation: 520 metres [1,710 ft])
- Tunglandsfjellet (Elevation: 388 metres [1,273 ft])
- Barkafjellet (Elevation: 419 metres [1,375 ft])
- Øykjafjellet (Elevation: 492 metres [1,614 ft])

== Notable people ==
- Espen Fiveland (born 1974), a journalist
- Jon Gjedebo (born 1945), an inventor and businessman
- Stian Heimlund Skjæveland (born 1973), a figurative painter and draftsman
- Trygve Holst (1907–1945), an advertising manager and resistance
- Tony Knapp (1936–2023), a former footballer and manager
- Johnny Lodden (born 1985), a poker player
- Silje Vige (born 1976), a singer
- Hugo Mikal Skår (born 1978), an actor

== See also ==
- List of towns and cities in Norway
