= Fiskå, Rogaland =

Village in Strand Municipality, Norway

Fiskå
- Village
- Interactive map of Fiskå
- Coordinates: 59.11474°N 6.00234°E
- Country: Norway
- Region: Western Norway
- County: Rogaland
- District: Ryfylke
- Municipality: Strand Municipality
- Elevation: 25 m (82 ft)
- Time zone: UTC+01:00 (CET)
  - Summer (DST): UTC+02:00 (CEST)
- Post Code: 4120 Tau

Fiskå is a village in Strand Municipality in Rogaland county, Norway. The village is located along the Årdalsfjorden, about 10 kilometres (6.2 mi) northeast of the village of Tau. The small farming village of Holta is located a short distance south of Fiskå. The lake Vostervatnet lies just up the hill to the south of the village. The lake drains out through the river Fiskåna which flows through the village of Fiskå on its way to the fjord.

All of the school children from northern Strand go to school in Fiskå. The Fiskå mølle mill has been grinding corn and selling it for centuries. It is one of the most significant businesses in the area.
