= Holta =

Village in Strand Municipality, Norway

- Village
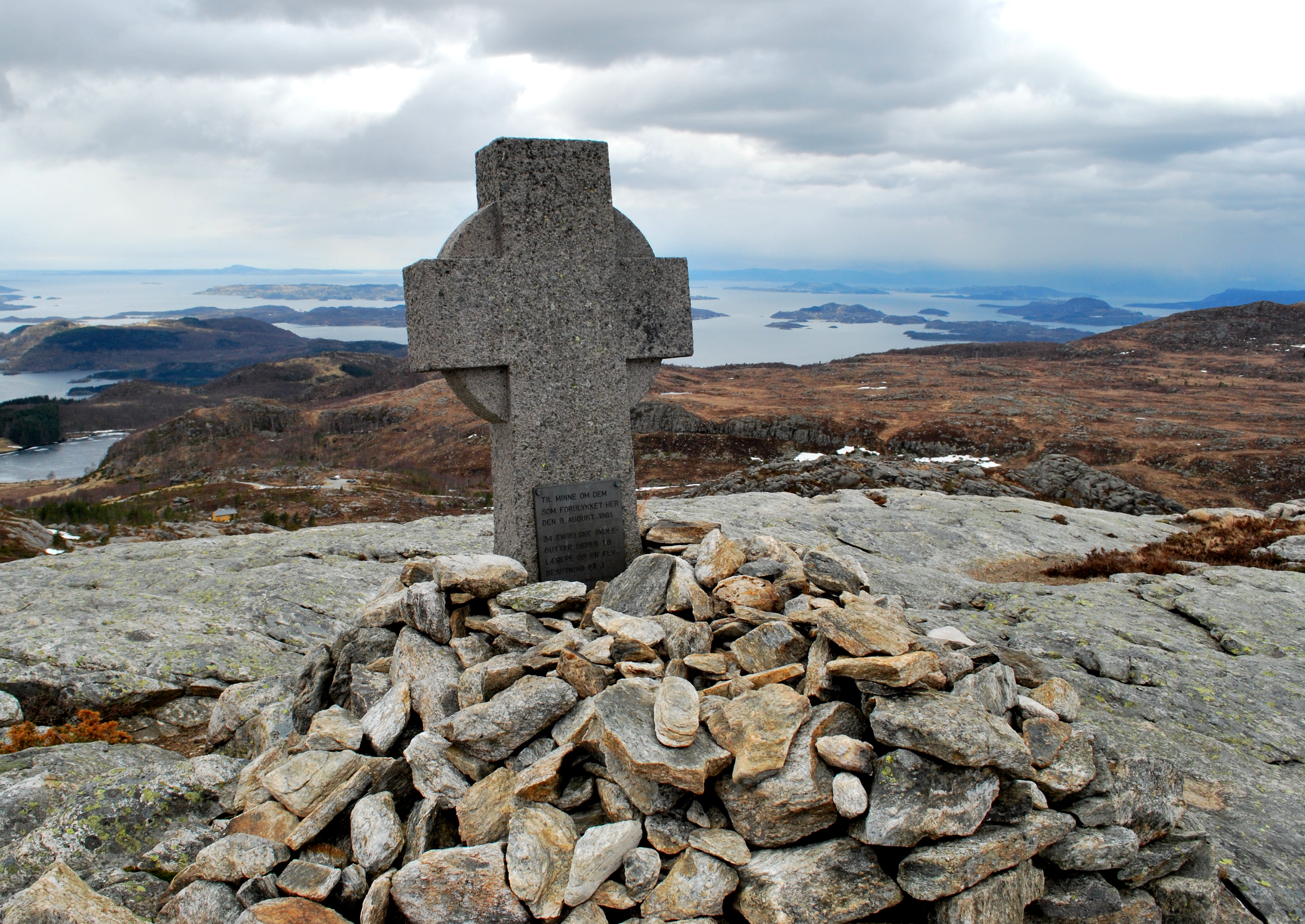
- A cross marking the crash site near Holta. The plaque reads "In memory of those who died here 9 August 1961. 34 English school boys, their two teachers and the three crew members. Erected by friends in Rogaland".
- Interactive map of Holta
- Coordinates: 59.08775°N 6.02779°E
- Country: Norway
- Region: Western Norway
- County: Rogaland
- District: Ryfylke
- Municipality: Strand Municipality
- Elevation: 244 m (801 ft)
- Time zone: UTC+01:00 (CET)
  - Summer (DST): UTC+02:00 (CEST)
- Post Code: 4120 Tau

Holta is a small farming village in Strand Municipality in Rogaland county, Norway. The farm is situated on the northern hills overlooking the lake Bjørheimsvatnet. The village is approximately 9 kilometres (5.6 mi) northeast of the village of Tau and about 4 kilometres (2.5 mi) south of the village of Fiskå. The city of Stavanger lies about 25 kilometres (16 mi) southwest of Holta (via the Ryfylke Tunnel that goes under a large fjord).

On 9 August 1961, the Holtaheia Accident took place as a Vickers VC.1 Viking passenger aeroplane, G-AHPM operated by Cunard Eagle Airways, transporting schoolboys from The Archbishop Lanfranc School in Thornton Heath, London, crashed into the mountainside above the farm (Holtaheia). A total of 34 students, two teachers, and three crew members were killed.
