= Johnny Lodden =

Norwegian poker player (born 1985)

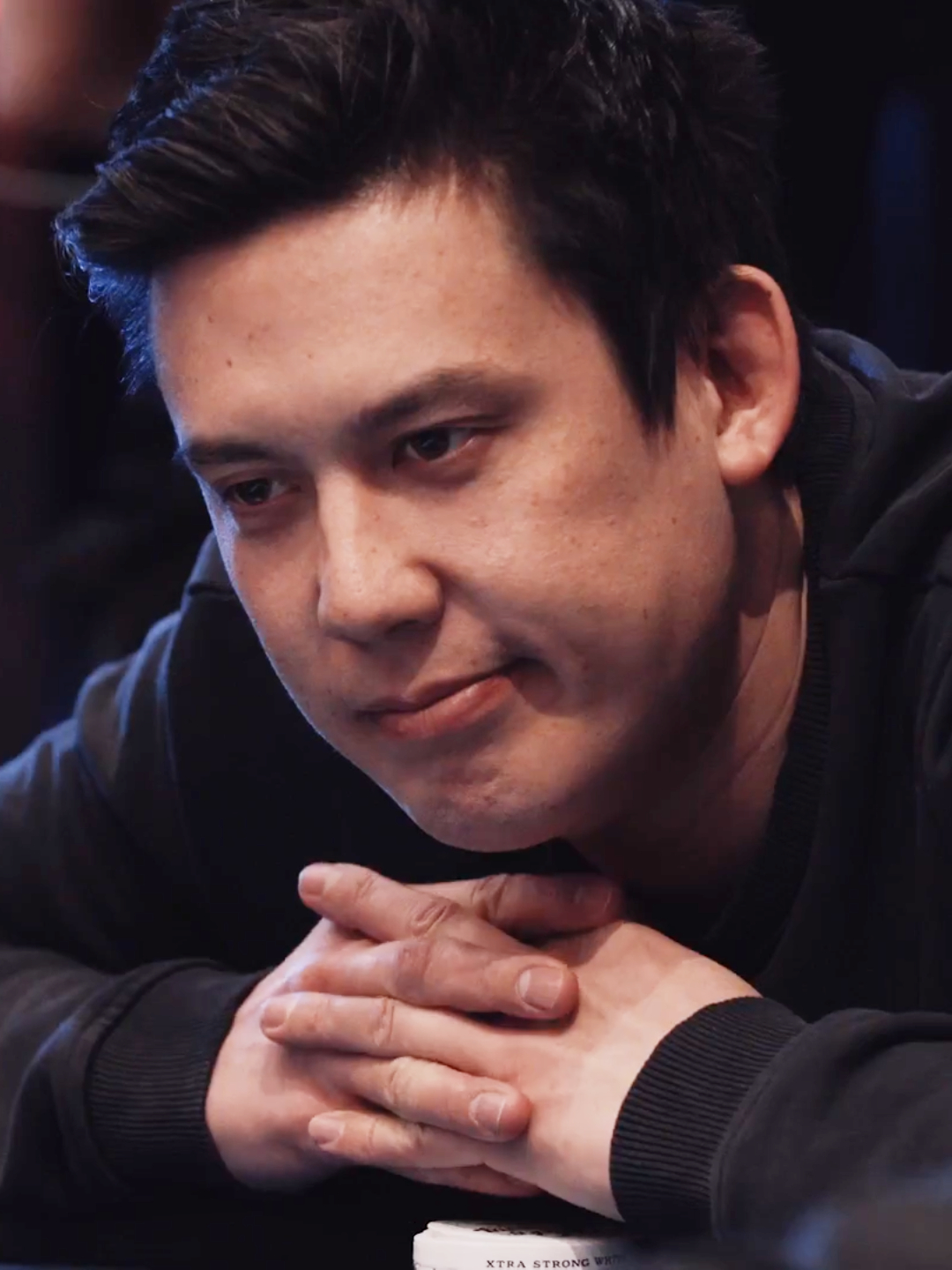
- Lodden at the Norwegian poker championship in 2018
- Nickname: bad_ip
- Born: 1 June 1985 (age 41)

World Series of Poker
- Bracelet: None
- Money finishes: 3
- Highest WSOP Main Event finish: 27th, 2010

European Poker Tour
- Title: None
- Final tables: 2
- Money finishes: 8

Johnny Lodden (born 1 June 1985 in Jørpeland, Norway) is a Norwegian professional poker player prominently known for his online success. He frequently played under the alias "bad_ip" on Prima network online high-stakes games (up to $40,000 buy-in NLHE), and for a brief time he was considered the biggest winner in the largest online cash games in the world (before Full Tilt Poker expanded to include larger games). Lodden has also been known to occasionally play on PokerStars under the alias "Lars-Magne". In August 2007 Lodden gave a brief interview with the Danish poker journal Acemag, where he admitted to having lost his whole bankroll and had to retire his old bad_ip account and start from scratch with a stake from a friend.

As of 2021, his total live tournament winnings exceed $2,800,000.

He used to be a member of both Team Pro PokerStars and Team PartyPoker.

== European Poker Tour ==
Lodden has cashed 22 times at the European Poker Tour, making the final table at the 2008 event in Budapest and the 2013 and 2015 event in Monte Carlo. In the 2008 PokerStars.com EPT Grand Final in Monte Carlo, Lodden was chip leader much of the tournament but ended up in 17th place earning €46,300 ($73,797). In 2013, he placed 3rd in Monte Carlo, earning €467,000. In 2015 he finished 4th after busting right after a massive bluff by Adrian Mateos.

== World Series of Poker ==
Lodden came in 11th place at the 2008 World Series of Poker Europe Main Event, earning £54,300 ($86,880). He cashed in one event at the 2009 World Series of Poker before making a deep run in the 2010 World Series of Poker Main Event, finishing 27th.

== Lodden Thinks ==
Lodden's name is associated with the game "Lodden Thinks" in which two bettors place bets on what a third party thinks is the answer to a given question. For example, the third party will be asked how old he thinks a particular person is or how much a particular item costs, and before revealing his answer the two players will place a bet on what they think the third party's answer will be. The actual answer to the question is irrelevant. This game was invented during the World Series of Poker Europe when Phil Laak and Antonio Esfandiari played the game, with Johnny Lodden as the third party.
