= Tau, Norway =

Village in Rogaland, Norway

Tau
- Village
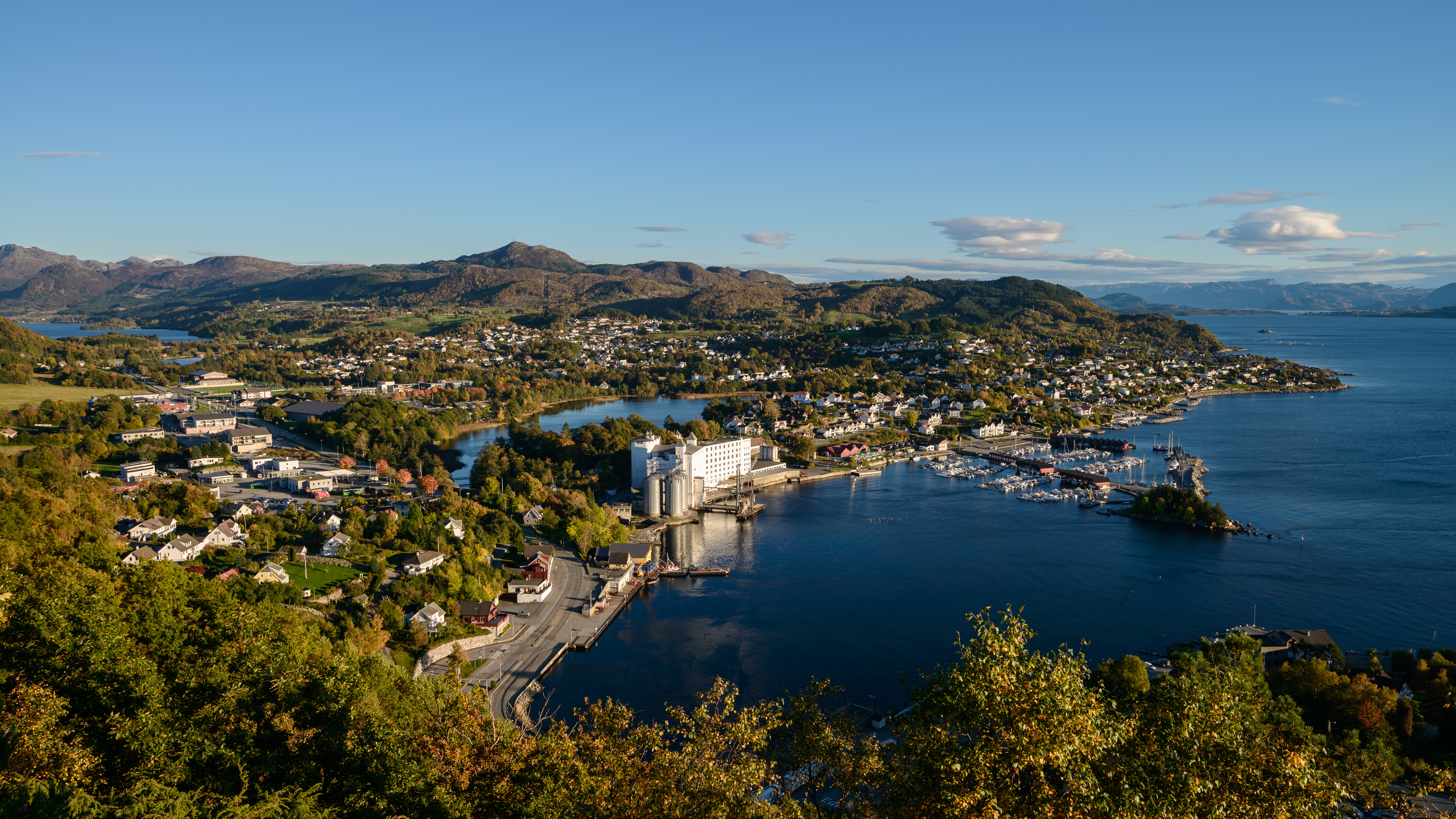
- View of the village
- Interactive map of Tau
- Coordinates: 59.06481°N 5.9225°E
- Country: Norway
- Region: Western Norway
- County: Rogaland
- District: Ryfylke
- Municipality: Strand Municipality

Area
  - Total: 2.29 km^{2} (0.88 sq mi)
- Elevation: 47 m (154 ft)

Population (2025)
  - Total: 3,505
  - Density: 1,531/km^{2} (3,970/sq mi)
- Time zone: UTC+01:00 (CET)
  - Summer (DST): UTC+02:00 (CEST)
- Post Code: 4120 Tau

Tau is a village in Strand Municipality in Rogaland county, Norway. The village is located on the shore of the Horgefjorden, a branch of the main Boknafjorden. Strand Church is located in the village.

The 2.29-square-kilometre (570-acre) village has a population (2019) of 3,505 and a population density of 1,531 inhabitants per square kilometre (3,970/sq mi).

The village lies along the Norwegian National Road 13 highway, southwest of the small villages of Fiskå and Holta and northwest of the town of Jørpeland. The Ryfylke Tunnel connects Tau to the city of Stavanger nearly 20 kilometres (12 mi) away on the other side of a wide fjord.

== Name ==
The name might come from the Old Norse word taufr which means 'witchcraft', since there was an ancient sacrificial field here in the Iron Age.

== Economy ==
Comrod Communications is the largest employer in Tau, mainly manufacturing antennas for military use. Electrocompaniet is also based here. The factory Tau Mølle AS is located in Tau, producing puffed oats. The factory is located in a white mill that was used to brew the Norwegian beer known as "Tou".
