= Stian Heimlund Skjæveland =

Representational painter

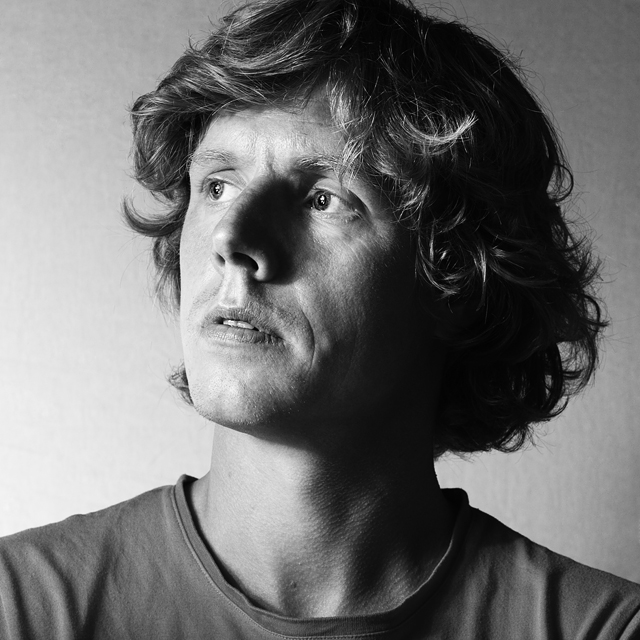
- Born: November 19, 1973 (age 52); Stavanger, Norway
- Known for: Painting, drawing and sculpture
- Notable work: "Reflections of Ryfylke", Mayor`s office and "Roots of Ryfylke", Council chambers, municipality of Strand, Norway
- Movement: Figurative art

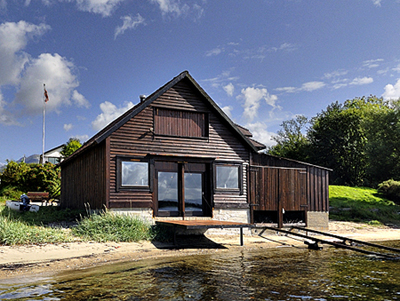
Galleri Skjæveland

Stian Heimlund Skjæveland (born November 19, 1973, in Stavanger) is a Norwegian representational painter and sculptor in the figurative tradition who also draws in black and white. He is inspired by the horizon, geometry and the tension between light and darkness (chiaroscuro).

== Life and work ==
He has formal background from Kunstskolen i Bergen (The Art School in Bergen), Merkantilt Institutt (MI) i Bergen, and Tegne-og maleskolen i Bergen (Bergen Drawing and Painting School), Norway. After finishing formal education he independently studied the old masters such as Leonardo da Vinci, Titian, Caravaggio, Rembrandt, Johannes Vermeer, Diego Velázquez, Goya and J. M. W. Turner. Within a Norwegian context the mystical landscape visions created by Lars Hertervig has been closely examined. As a creator of pictorials Stian has performed for the last 20 years, and has been purchased by Mayor`s office and Council chambers municipality of Strand, Norway. The artist has in recent years simplified his paintings to achieve a more monumental expression. Stian Heimlund Skjæveland has his own gallery in a small former shipyard in Jørpeland Norway.

=== Exhibitions in Norway (selected) ===
Sources:

- R-Open, Rogaland
- Lysefjord-Helleren, Lysefjorden
- Galleri Sagholmen, Jørpeland
- Ryfylke kulturfestival, Jørpeland
- Galleri Motvekt, Stavanger
- Dale's Galleri, Karmøy
- Galleri F12, Stavanger
- Galleri 1897, Kristiansand
- Ryfylkeutstillingen, Strand, Hjelmeland, Forsand, Suldal, Finnøy
- Spinneriet, Hjelmeland
- Focus, Stavanger
- Galleri OS, Sandnes
- Galleri Loyd, Oslo
- Galleri Skjæveland, Jørpeland

=== Work of embellishment ===
- The Museum of Archaeology, Stavanger, Norway
- Mayor's office, municipality of Strand, Norway
- Council chambers, municipality of Strand, Norway

=== Books ===
- The art book "Når Dagen Gryr", 1999 ISBN 82-7096-320-8 (Only in Norwegian)
