= Håland Municipality =

Former municipality in Rogaland, Norway

Håland Municipality Håland herred
- Former municipality
- Haaland herred (historic name)
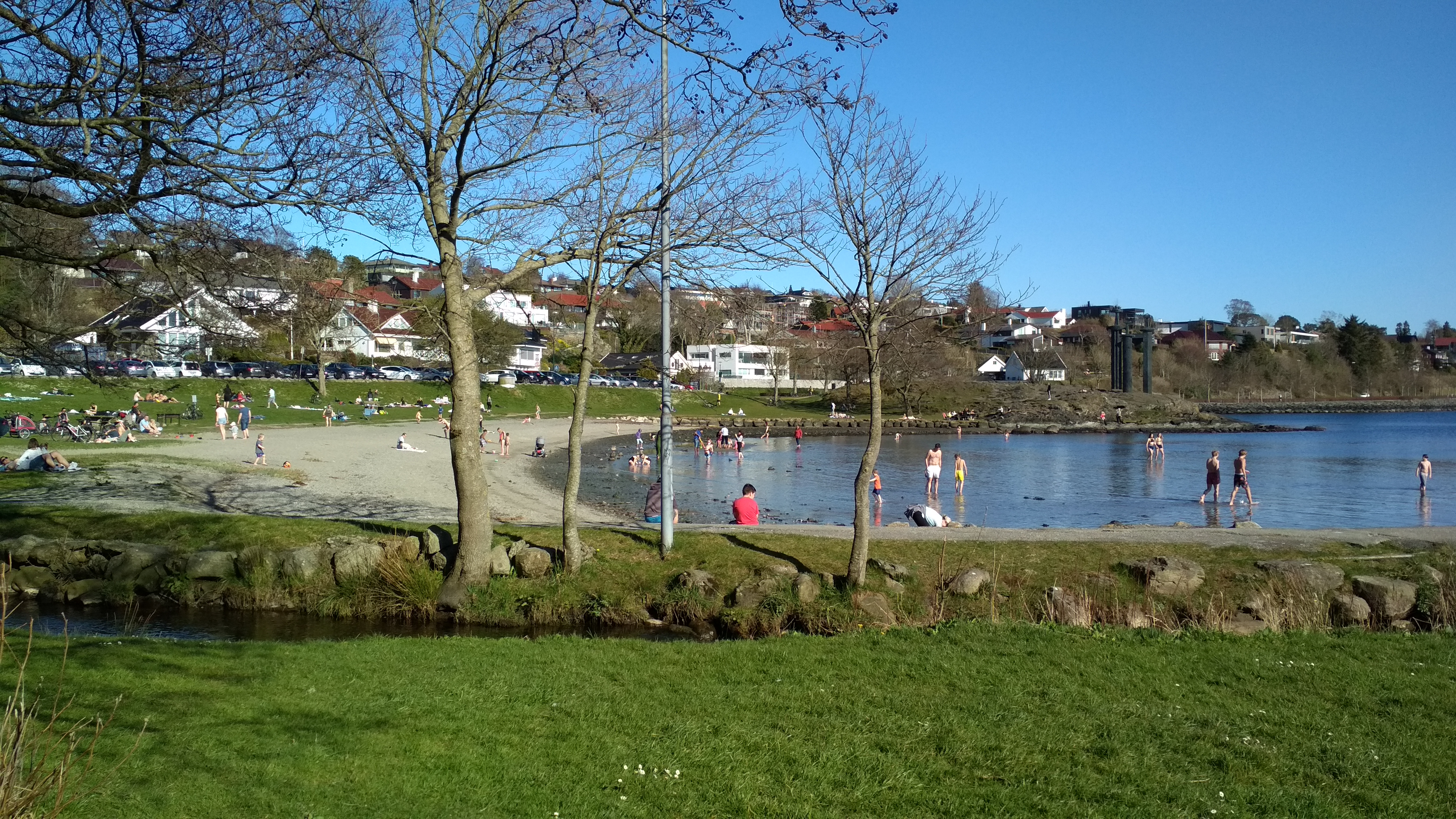
- View of the Møllebukta bay in Håland

- Rogaland within Norway

- Håland within Rogaland
- Coordinates: 58°51′22″N 05°34′30″E
- Country: Norway
- County: Rogaland
- District: Jæren
- Established: 1 Jan 1838
  - Created as: Formannskapsdistrikt
- Disestablished: 1 Jan 1930
  - Succeeded by: Sola Municipality and Madla Municipality
- Administrative centre: Solakrossen

Government
  - Mayor (1929–1930): Jakob Svendsen Gimre (H)

Area (upon dissolution)
  - Total: 85 km^{2} (33 sq mi)
- Highest elevation: 101.84 m (334.1 ft)

Population (1930)
  - Total: 4,463
  - Density: 53/km^{2} (140/sq mi)

Official language
  - Norwegian form: Neutral
- Time zone: UTC+01:00 (CET)
  - Summer (DST): UTC+02:00 (CEST)
- ISO 3166 code: NO-1124

Håland (Urban East Norwegian: [ˈhòːlɑn]) is a former municipality in Rogaland county, Norway. The 85-square-kilometre (33 sq mi) municipality existed from 1838 until its dissolution in 1930. The area is now divided between Sola Municipality and Stavanger Municipality in the traditional district of Jæren. The administrative centre was the village of Solakrossen. Other notable villages included Tananger, Kvernavik, Tjora, Ræge, and Madla.

== General information ==
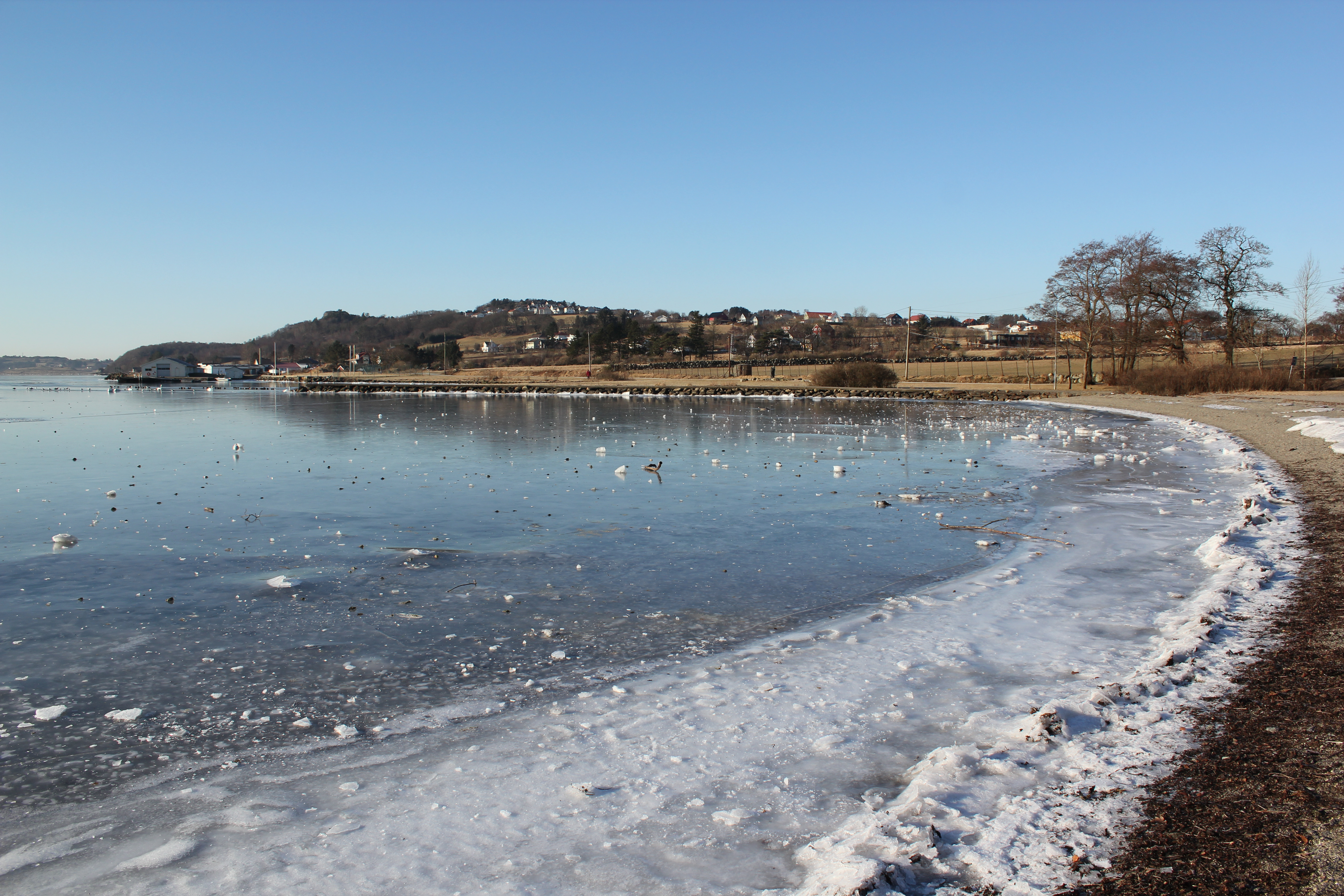
View of the shore of the Hafrsfjord

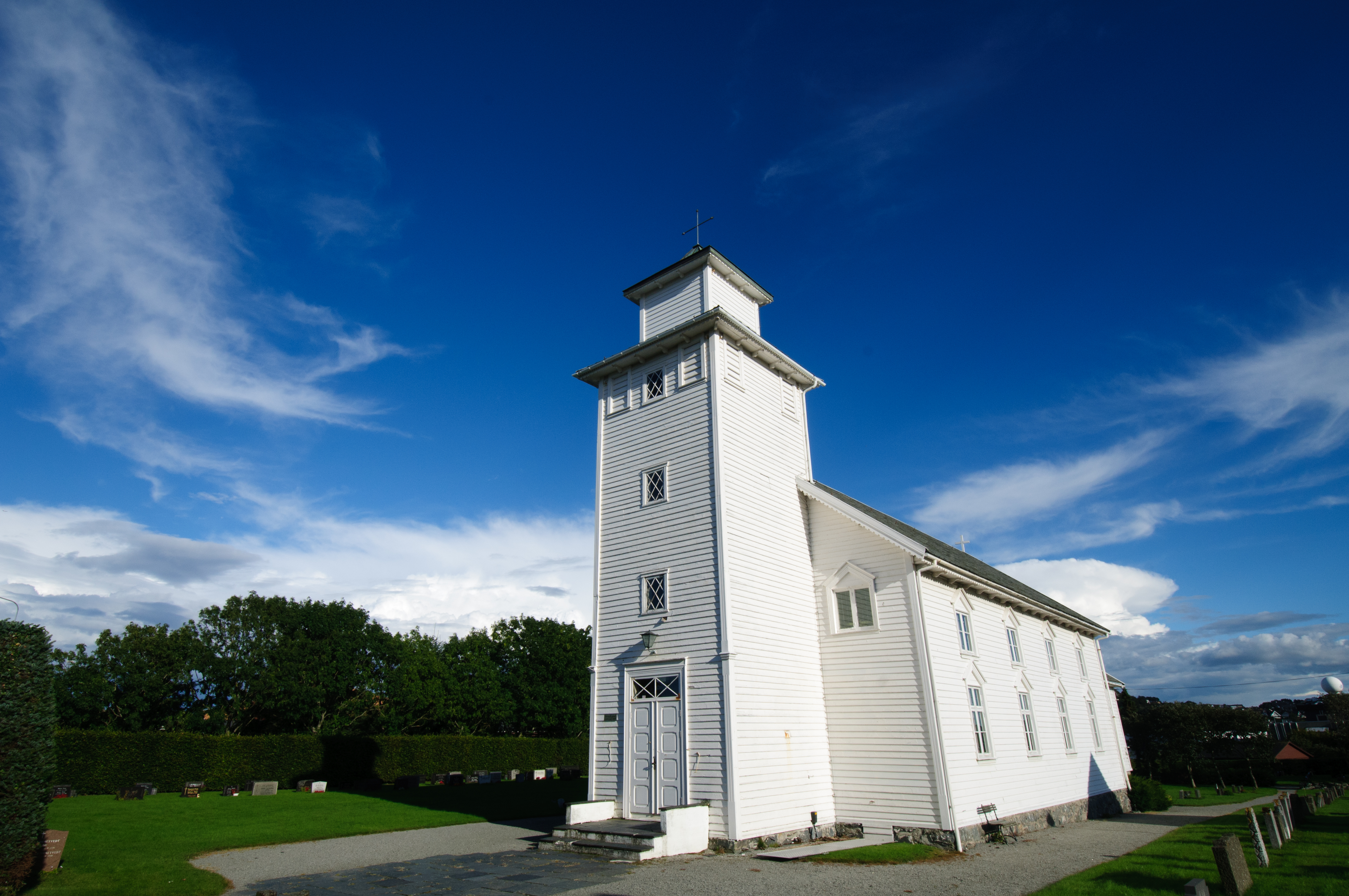
View of the local church in Tananger in Håland Municipality

The historic parish of Haaland (later spelled Håland) included churches located in Solakrossen, Tananger, Tjora, and Madla. On 1 January 1838, the parish of Haaland was established as a municipality (see formannskapsdistrikt law). The borders of Håland Municipality were never changed. Håland Municipality existed until 1930, when it was dissolved and its lands were divided as follows: the areas north of the Hafrsfjord (population: 1,091) became the new Madla Municipality and the areas south of the Hafrsfjord (population: 3,372) became the new Sola Municipality Later, Madla Municipality was dissolved and it became part of Stavanger Municipality where it now makes up the borough of Madla.

=== Name ===
The municipality (originally the parish) is named after the old Haaland farm (Old Norse: Háland or Hávaland). The first element comes from the word hár which means "high" or "tall". The last element is land which means "land" or "district".

On 21 December 1917, a royal resolution enacted the 1917 Norwegian language reforms. Prior to this change, the name was spelled Haaland with the digraph "aa", and after this reform, the name was spelled Håland, using the letter å instead.

=== Churches ===
The Church of Norway had one parish (sokn) within Håland Municipality. At the time of the municipal dissolution, it was part of the Håland prestegjeld and the Jæren prosti (deanery) in the Diocese of Stavanger.

Churches in Håland Municipality
Parish (sokn)	Church name	Location of the church	Year built
Sola	Tanganger Church	Tananger	1879
Sola	Madla Chapel	Sør-Sunde	1865

== Geography ==
The 85-square-kilometre (33 sq mi) municipality included the land surrounding the Hafrsfjorden including all of the present-day Sola Municipality plus the borough of Madla which is located on the west side of the city of Stavanger The municipality included mostly land on the mainland, but also some coastal islands including Rott, Tjør, Buøya, and Håstein. The highest point in the municipality was the 101.84-metre (334.1 ft) tall mountain Kjerrberget.

Randaberg Municipality was located to the north, Hetland Municipality was located to the east, Høyland Municipality was located to the southeast, Klepp Municipality was located to the south, and the North Sea was located to the west.

== Government ==
While it existed, Håland Municipality was responsible for primary education (through 10th grade), outpatient health services, senior citizen services, welfare and other social services, zoning, economic development, and municipal roads and utilities. The municipality was governed by a municipal council of directly elected representatives. The mayor was indirectly elected by a vote of the municipal council. The municipality was under the jurisdiction of the Jæren District Court and the Gulating Court of Appeal.

=== Mayors ===
The mayor (Norwegian: ordfører) of Håland Municipality was the political leader of the municipality and the chairperson of the municipal council. The following people have held this position:

- 1838–1841: Ole Gabriel Monsen
- 1842–1845: Rev. Niels Christopher Bøckmann
- 1846–1849: Ole Gabriel Monsen
- 1850–1851: Rev. Niels Christopher Bøckmann
- 1852–1853: John Hansen Rønneberg
- 1854–1855: Ole Gabriel Monsen
- 1856–1857: Ole Evensen Byberg
- 1858–1859: Rev. Niels Christopher Bøckmann
- 1860–1879: Ole Gabriel Monsen
- 1880–1883: Anders Helgesen Rommetvedt
- 1884–1885: Kristian Monsen Stangeland
- 1886–1893: Anders Helgesen Rommetvedt
- 1894–1895: Jakob O. Sanne
- 1896–1904: Anders Helgesen Rommetvedt
- 1905–1907: Thorbjørn Trøiel
- 1908–1913: Tørres Joa
- 1914–1916: Jakob Svendsen Gimre (H)
- 1917–1922: Rasmus G. Malde
- 1923–1925: Jakob Svendsen Gimre (H)
- 1926–1928: Gabriel Joa
- 1929–1930: Jakob Svendsen Gimre (H)

== See also ==
- List of former municipalities of Norway
