= Farmen 2021 (Norway) =

- Season 17
- Presented by: Mads Hansen
- No. of days: 75
- No. of contestants: 16
- Winner: Daniel Godø
- Runner-up: Tonje Frigstad
- Location: Østre Toten, Norway

Release
- Original network: TV 2
- Original release: September 21 – December 5, 2021

Season chronology
- ← Previous; Farmen 2020 Next → Farmen 2022

Farmen 2021 (The Farm 2021) is the seventeenth season of the Norwegian version of The Farm reality television show. This season takes place on a farm located in Østre Toten Municipality where contestants need to live on the farm like it was a century prior. The season premiered on 21 September 2021.

== Format ==
Fourteen contestants are chosen from the outside world. Each week one contestant is selected the Farmer of the Week. In the first week, the contestants choose the Farmer. Since week 2, the Farmer is chosen by the contestant evicted in the previous week.

=== Nomination process ===
The Farmer of the Week nominates two people (a man and a woman) as the Butlers. The others must decide which Butler is the first to go to the Battle. That person then chooses the second person (from the same sex) for the Battle and also the type of battle (a quiz, extrusion, endurance, sleight). The Battle winner must win two duels. The Battle loser is evicted from the game.

== Finishing order ==
(ages stated are at time of contest)

Contestant	Age	Residence	Entered	Exited	Status	Finish
Mohammed Sarmadawy	27	Øystese	Day 1	Day 7	1st Evicted; Day 7	17th
Tina Teien	38	Oslo	Day 1	Day 10	Left Competition; Day 10	16th
Sulekha Geele	36	Oslo	Day 1	Day 14	2nd Evicted; Day 14	15th
Kjell Strand	55	Kvernevik	Day 1	Day 21	3rd Evicted; Day 21	14th
Amalie Lund	23	Tønsberg	Day 1	Day 28	4th Evicted; Day 28	13th
Anette Svendsen	40	Mjøndalen	Day 23	Day 35	5th Evicted; Day 35	12th
Herman Herberth Herding	24	Oslo	Day 1	Day 42	6th Evicted; Day 42	11th
Grethe Enlid	49	Trondheim	Day 1	Day 49	7th Evicted; Day 49	10th
Robert Michael Scott	53	Bergen	Day 1	Day 56	8th Evicted; Day 56	9th
Gunnar Svingen	25	Trysil	Day 23	Day 63	9th Evicted; Day 63	8th
Thorvald Nyquist	51	Asker	Day 1	Day 70	10th Evicted; Day 70	7th
Heidi Persdatter Greiner Haaker	55	Kirkenes	Day 1	Day 72	11th Evicted; Day 72	6th
Kåre Gunnar Skaret Bjøringsøy	35	Smøla	Day 1	Day 72	12th Evicted; Day 72	5th
Simon Tronstad Jacobsen	23	Tromsø	Day 1	Day 73	13th Evicted; Day 73	4th
Heidi Lereng	24	Bergen	Day 1	Day 74	14th Evicted; Day 74	3rd
Tonje Frigstad	21	Kristiansand	Day 1	Day 75	Runner-up; Day 75	2nd
Daniel Godø	28	Ålesund	Day 56	Day 75	Winner; Day 75	1st

== Torpet ==
After the contestants are eliminated, they are taken to Torpet where they'll be given a second chance to try and re-enter the competition. Three contestants from previous seasons return to compete against the new arrivals to try and fight their way back to earn a spot and return to The Farm.

Contestant	Age	Residence	Season	Status	Finish
Dineke Polderman	49	Stavanger	Farmen 2018	Lost Duel; Day 9	10th
Sulekha Geele	36	Oslo	New	Left Competition; Day 15	9th
Kjell Strand	55	Kvernevik	New	Lost Duel; Day 23	8th
Nils Kvalvik	40	Karasjok	Farmen 2020	Ejected; Day 29	7th
Anette Svendsen	40	Mjøndalen	New	Left Competition; Day 37	6th
Herman Herberth Herding	24	Oslo	New	Lost Duel; Day 44	5th
Grethe Enlid	49	Trondheim	New	Lost Duel; Day 51	4th
Amalie Lund	23	Tønsberg	New	Lost Duel; Day 56	2nd/3rd
Mohammed Sarmadawy	27	Øystese	New	Lost Duel; Day 56	2nd/3rd
Daniel Godø	28	Ålesund	Farmen 2014	Entered Farm; Day 56	1st

== Challengers ==
On the fourth week, three challengers come to the farm where they'll live for one week while doing chores and getting to know the other contestants. At the end of the week, the contestants on the farm decide which one is allowed to stay on the farm and which two fight in a duel to determine who stays on The Farm and who goes home.

Contestant	Age	Residence	Status	Finish
Torstein Knutsen	62	Bjerkvik	Left Competition; Day 24	3rd
Anette Svendsen	40	Mjøndalen	Entered Farm; Day 24	1st/2nd
Gunnar Svingen	25	Trysil	Entered Farm; Day 24	1st/2nd

== The game ==
Week	Farmer of the Week	1st Dueler	2nd Dueler	Evicted	Finish
1	Thorvald	Robert	Mohammed	Mohammed	1st Evicted; Day 7
2	Robert	Grethe	Sulekha	Tina	Left Competition; Day 10
2	Robert	Grethe	Sulekha	Sulekha	2nd Evicted; Day 14
3	Heidi H.	Kjell	Robert	Kjell	3rd Evicted; Day 21
4	Grethe	Heidi H.	Amalie	Amalie	4th Evicted; Day 28
5	Tonje	Anette	Heidi L.	Anette	5th Evicted; Day 35
6	Grethe	Kåre	Herman	Herman	6th Evicted; Day 42
7	Gunnar	Grethe	Heidi L.	Grete	7th Evicted; Day 49
8	Kåre	Gunnar	Robert	Robert	8th Evicted; Day 56
9	Kåre	Simon	Gunnar	Gunnar	9th Evicted; Day 63
10	Simon	Thorvald	Kåre	Thorvald	10th Evicted; Day 70
11	None	All	All	Heidi H.	11th Evicted; Day 72
11	None	All	All	Kåre	12th Evicted; Day 72
11	None	All	All	Simon	13th Evicted; Day 73
11	None	All	All	Heidi L.	14th Evicted; Day 74
11	None	All	All	Tonje	Runner-up; Day 75
11	None	All	All	Daniel	Winner; Day 75
