= Madla Municipality =

Former municipality in Rogaland, Norway

Madla Municipality Madla herred
- Former municipality
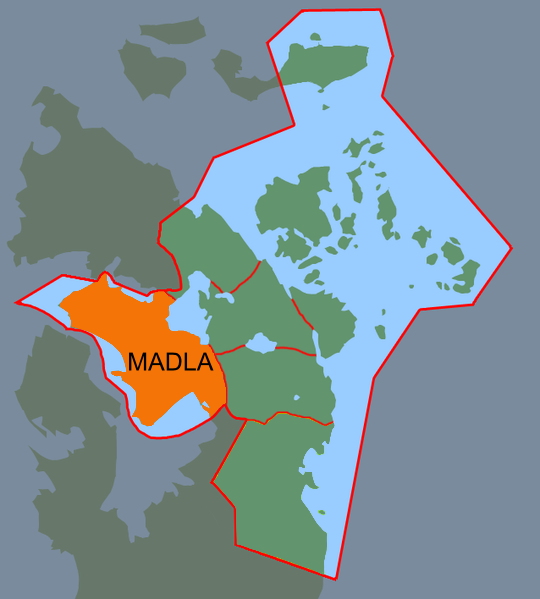
- Map of Madla in relation to the present-day city of Stavanger

- Rogaland within Norway

- Madla within Rogaland
- Coordinates: 58°56′37″N 05°40′13″E
- Country: Norway
- County: Rogaland
- District: Jæren
- Established: 1 Jan 1930
  - Preceded by: Håland Municipality
- Disestablished: 1 Jan 1965
  - Succeeded by: Stavanger Municipality
- Administrative centre: Madlamark

Area (upon dissolution)
  - Total: 15.8 km^{2} (6.1 sq mi)
  - Rank: #499 in Norway
- Highest elevation: 96 m (315 ft)

Population (1964)
  - Total: 5,621
  - Rank: #171 in Norway
  - Density: 355.8/km^{2} (922/sq mi)
  - Change (10 years): ▲ +94%
- Demonym: Madlabu

Official language
  - Norwegian form: Neutral
- Time zone: UTC+01:00 (CET)
  - Summer (DST): UTC+02:00 (CEST)
- ISO 3166 code: NO-1125

Madla is a former municipality in Rogaland county, Norway. The 15.8-square-kilometre (6.1 sq mi) municipality existed from 1930 until its dissolution in 1965. The area is now part of Stavanger Municipality in the traditional district of Jæren. It was one of the smallest municipalities in Rogaland county, with only four farms: Malde (now spelled Madla), Revheim, North-Sunde, and South-Sunde. The municipal centre was located at Malde, now known as Madlamark. The small municipality now exists as the borough of Madla inside the city of Stavanger, on the northeast side of the Hafrsfjorden.

Prior to its dissolution in 1965, the 15.8-square-kilometre (6.1 sq mi) municipality was the 499th largest by area out of the 525 municipalities in Norway. Madl Municipality was the 171st most populous municipality in Norway with a population of about 5,621. The municipality's population density was 355.8 inhabitants per square kilometre (922/sq mi) and its population had increased by an astounding 94% over the previous 10-year period.

== General information ==
Madla Municipality was established on 1 January 1930 when the old Håland Municipality was dissolved and split into two separate municipalities: the areas located southwest of the Hafrsfjord (population: 3,372) became the new Sola Municipality and the areas located northeast of the fjord (population: 1,901) became the new Madla Municipality.

During the 1960s, there were many municipal mergers across Norway due to the work of the Schei Committee. On 1 January 1965, Madla Municipality was merged with the following areas to create a new, larger Stavanger Municipality:

- all of the city of Stavanger (population: 51,470)
- all of Madla Municipality (population: 6,025)
- most of Hetland Municipality (population: 20,861), except for the Riska and Dale areas which became part of Sandnes Municipality

=== Name ===
The municipality (originally the parish) is named after the old Malle farm (Old Norse: Mallar). The meaning of the name is uncertain. One possibility is that it comes from the word malmr which means "gravel" or "ore". Another possibility is that it comes from the word mold which means "earth" or "dirt". Historically, the farm name was spelled Malle or Malde.

=== Churches ===
The Church of Norway had one parish (sokn) within Madla Municipality. At the time of the municipal dissolution, it was part of the Håland prestegjeld and the Jæren prosti (deanery) in the Diocese of Stavanger.

Churches in Madla Municipality
Parish (sokn)	Church name	Location of the church	Year built
Madla	Revheim Church	Sør-Sunde	1865

== Geography ==
The small municipality was located on the northeastern shore of the Hafrsfjord. The highest point in the municipality was the 96-metre (315 ft) tall mountain Gjeresberget. Randaberg Municipality was located to the north, Hetland Municipality was located to the east, Sola Municipality was located to the south, and the North Sea was located to the west.

== Government ==
While it existed, Madla Municipality was responsible for primary education (through 10th grade), outpatient health services, senior citizen services, welfare and other social services, zoning, economic development, and municipal roads and utilities. The municipality was governed by a municipal council of directly elected representatives. The mayor was indirectly elected by a vote of the municipal council. The municipality was under the jurisdiction of the Hafrsfjord District Court and the Gulating Court of Appeal.

=== Municipal council ===
The municipal council (Herredsstyre) of Madla Municipality was made up of 17 representatives that were elected to four year terms. The tables below show the historical composition of the council by political party.

Madla herredsstyre 1963–1965
Party name (in Norwegian)	Number of representatives
Labour Party (Arbeiderpartiet)	6
Conservative Party (Høyre)	5
Christian Democratic Party (Kristelig Folkeparti)	2
Centre Party (Senterpartiet)	1
Liberal Party (Venstre)	3
Total number of members:	17
Note: On 1 January 1965, Madla Municipality became part of Stavanger Municipality.

Madla herredsstyre 1959–1963
Party name (in Norwegian)	Number of representatives
Labour Party (Arbeiderpartiet)	5
Conservative Party (Høyre)	5
Christian Democratic Party (Kristelig Folkeparti)	2
Centre Party (Senterpartiet)	1
Liberal Party (Venstre)	4
Total number of members:	17

Madla herredsstyre 1955–1959
Party name (in Norwegian)	Number of representatives
Labour Party (Arbeiderpartiet)	5
Christian Democratic Party (Kristelig Folkeparti)	3
Joint List(s) of Non-Socialist Parties (Borgerlige Felleslister)	5
Local List(s) (Lokale lister)	4
Total number of members:	17

Madla herredsstyre 1951–1955
Party name (in Norwegian)	Number of representatives
Labour Party (Arbeiderpartiet)	4
Christian Democratic Party (Kristelig Folkeparti)	3
Joint List(s) of Non-Socialist Parties (Borgerlige Felleslister)	5
Local List(s) (Lokale lister)	4
Total number of members:	16

Madla herredsstyre 1947–1951
Party name (in Norwegian)	Number of representatives
Labour Party (Arbeiderpartiet)	3
Christian Democratic Party (Kristelig Folkeparti)	3
Joint List(s) of Non-Socialist Parties (Borgerlige Felleslister)	5
Local List(s) (Lokale lister)	1
Total number of members:	12

Madla herredsstyre 1945–1947
Party name (in Norwegian)	Number of representatives
Labour Party (Arbeiderpartiet)	3
Christian Democratic Party (Kristelig Folkeparti)	3
Local List(s) (Lokale lister)	6
Total number of members:	12

Madla herredsstyre 1937–1941*
Party name (in Norwegian)	Number of representatives
Labour Party (Arbeiderpartiet)	1
Joint List(s) of Non-Socialist Parties (Borgerlige Felleslister)	11
Total number of members:	12
Note: Due to the German occupation of Norway during World War II, no elections were held for new municipal councils until after the war ended in 1945.

=== Mayors ===
The mayor (Norwegian: ordfører) of Madla Municipality was the political leader of the municipality and the chairperson of the municipal council. The following people have held this position:

- 1930–1931: Michel Tjærandsen Amdal
- 1931–1934: Kristian Munthe
- 1934–1937: John Åsland
- 1937–1941: Jon Sundal
- 1941–1945: Sverre Johansen
- 1945–1945: Jon Sundal (LL)
- 1946–1951: Rev. Johannes Rege (KrF)
- 1951–1955: Jon Sundal (LL)
- 1955–1956: Rev. Johannes Rege (KrF)
- 1956–1963: Andreas Thorsen (H)
- 1963–1964: Arne Rettedal (H)

== See also ==
- List of former municipalities of Norway
