= Ytraberget =

Peninsula in Sola, Rogaland, Norway

Ytraberget Ytraberg
- Peninsula
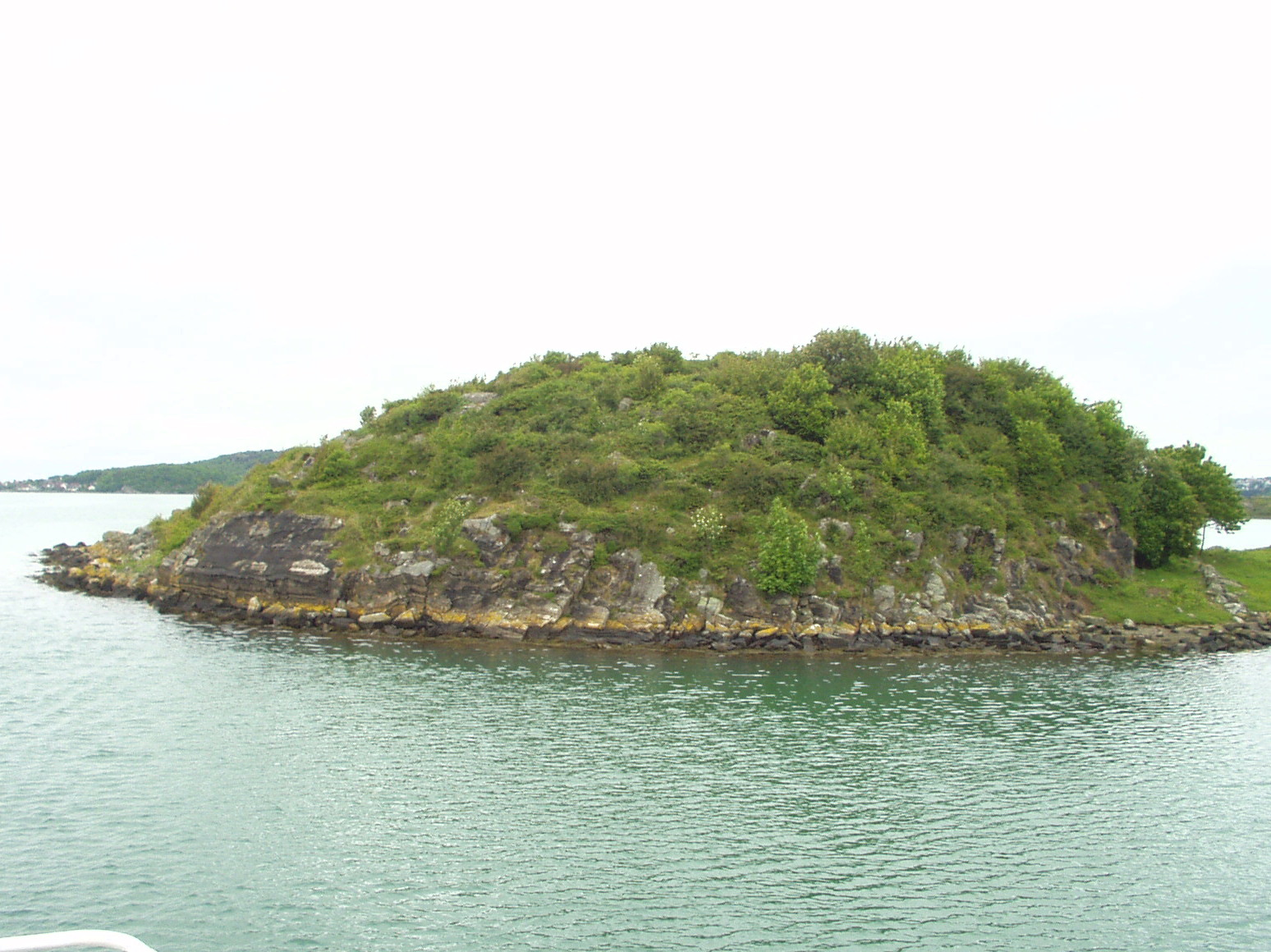
- View of the Ytraberget peninsula
- Interactive map of the area
- Coordinates: 58.91386°N 5.66065°E
- Location: Rogaland, Norway
- Part of: Stavanger Peninsula
- Offshore water bodies: Hafrsfjord

Ytraberg or Ytraberget is a small peninsula that sticks out into the Hafrsfjord in Sola Municipality in Rogaland county, Norway. Ytraberget is connected to Indraberget and it is located, just north of the village of Sørnes, between two small bays: Sørnesvågen and Grannesvågen.

Harald Fairhair (ca. 865-ca. 933) fought the Battle of Hafrsfjord during 872 AD. In the Saga by Snorri Sturluson, a little isle is mentioned as the location where Kjotve the Rich fled the battle. The little isle is commonly held to have been Ytraberget, although it is now connected by a low isthmus of some 2 metres (6 ft 7 in) in elevation to Indraberget. It is thought that the Earth's crust rebounding post glaciation over 1,100 years has exposed the connection between the two.

On the top of the hill, there is a plateau about 100 by 50 metres (330 ft × 160 ft). This is the area of the Bronze Age stone fortifications (bygdeborg). There are three or four buildings that were a part of the ruined structure, all about 8 by 5 metres (26 ft × 16 ft). Near the top of Ytraberget there is a stone slab monument erected in 1972 near the ruins for the 1,100-year anniversary of the Battle of Hafrsfjord. There are good fishing and swimming possibilities at Ytraberget. Ytraberget today is a very common swimming spot for local teenagers.

Indraberget is the mainland area that Ytreberget connects to. This area has some of the richest limestone flora in this part of Norway. There is also rich archeological findings for the Stone Age, Bronze Age and to modern times.
