= Sverd i fjell =

Commemorative monument of the unification of the Norwegian Kingdom

- Sverd i fjell
- Interactive map of Sverd i fjell
- Location: Hafrsfjord, Norway
- Coordinates: 58.9414°N 5.6713°E
- Designer: Fritz Røed
- Material: Bronze
- Height: 10 m (32 ft 9 1/2 in)
- Completion date: 1983

Sverd i fjell (English: Swords in mountain) is a commemorative monument located in the Hafrsfjord neighborhood of Madla, a borough of the city of Stavanger which lies in the southwestern part of the large Stavanger Municipality in Rogaland county, Norway.

== History ==
The three bronze swords stand 10 metres (33 ft) tall and are planted into the rock of a small hill next to the fjord. They commemorate the historic Battle of Hafrsfjord which took place there in the year 872, when King Harald Fairhair gathered all of Norway under one crown. The largest sword represents the victorious Harald, and the two smaller swords represent the defeated petty kings. The monument also represents peace, since the swords are planted into solid rock, so they may never be removed.

== Gallery ==
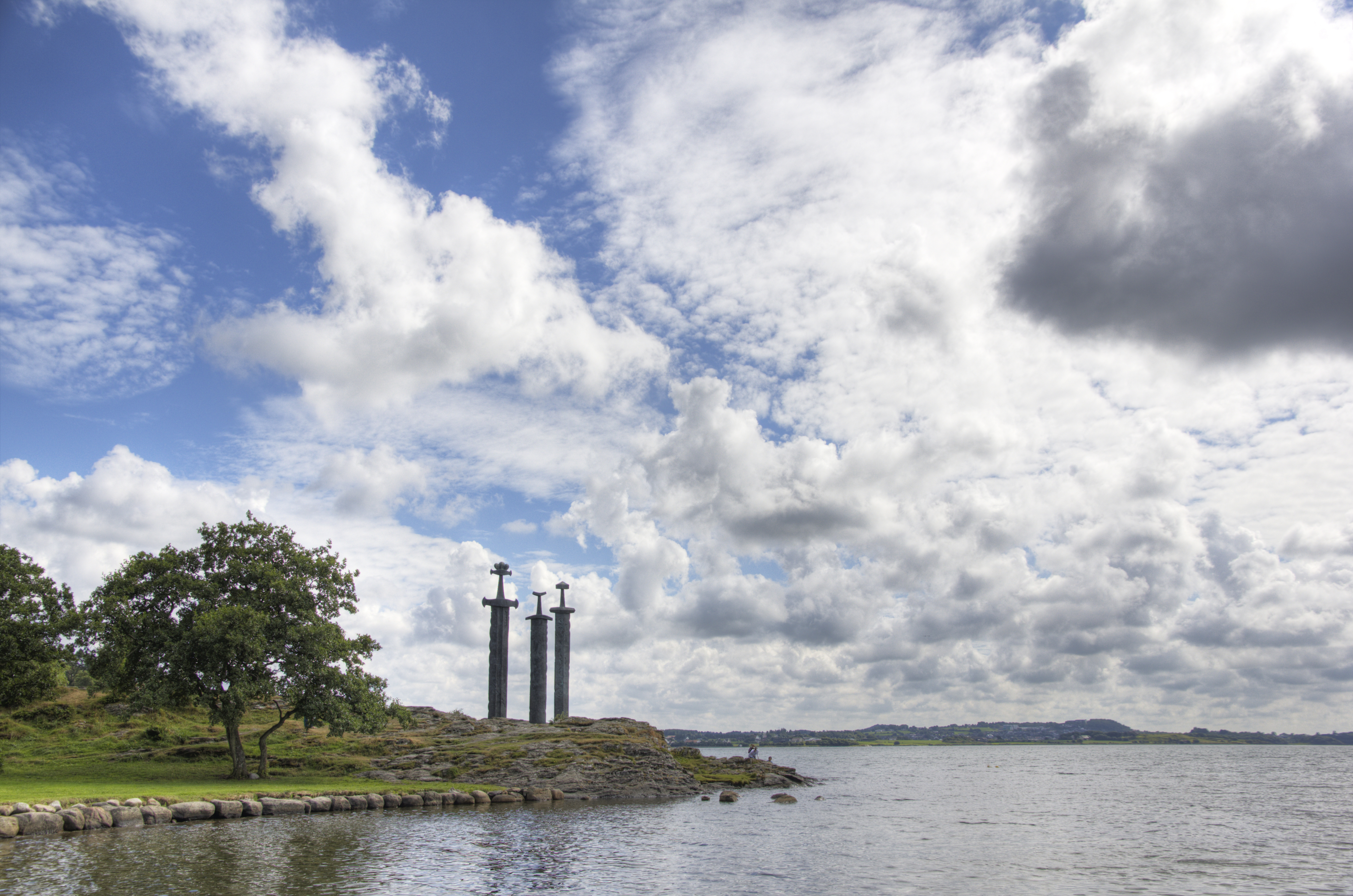

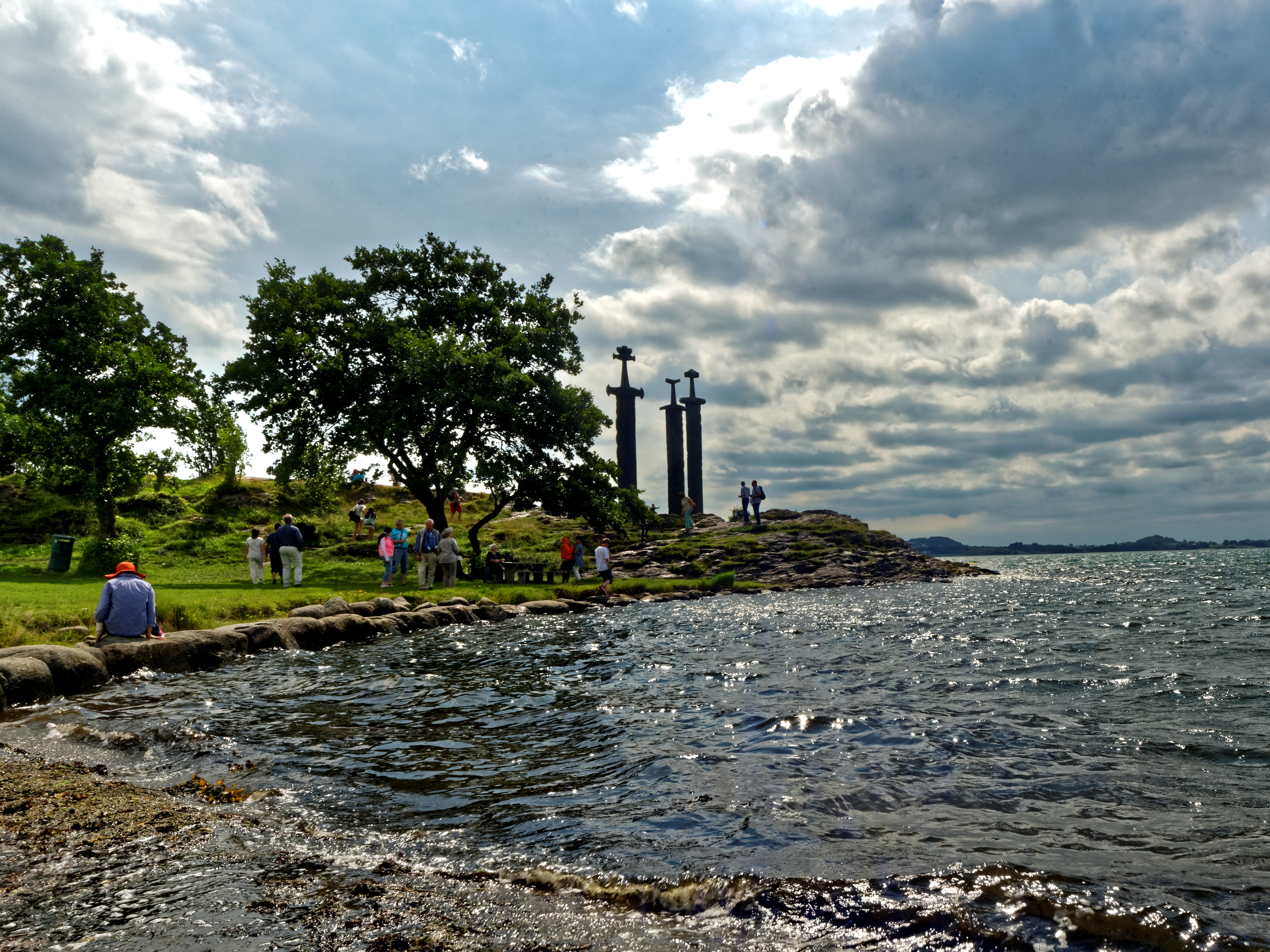

== See also ==
- Møllebukta
- Ytraberget
