= Madlamark =

Neighborhood of Stavanger, Norway

Coordinates: 58°56′45″N 5°40′58″E

Madlamark is a neighborhood (delområde) in the city of Stavanger which lies in the southwestern part of the large Stavanger Municipality in Rogaland county, Norway. It is located in the borough of Madla at the innermost part of the Hafrsfjord. This area was historically part of the old Madla Municipality until 1965. The neighborhood has a population of 6,556 which is distributed over an area of 2.49 square kilometres (620 acres). Madlamark Church is located in the centre of the neighborhood.
