= Farmen 2019 (Norway) =

- Genre: Reality Show
- Presented by: Gaute Grøtta Grav
- Country of origin: Norway
- Original language: Norwegian

Production
- Production locations: Kragerø, Norway

Original release
- Network: TV2
- Release: 24 September – 10 December 2019

Related
- Farmen 2018; Farmen 2020

Farmen 2019 (The Farm 2019) was the fifteenth season of the Norwegian version of The Farm reality television show. The show premiered on 24 September 2019 on TV2 and ended on 10 December 2019.

== Format ==
Fourteen contestants are chosen from the outside world. Each week one contestant is selected the Farmer of the Week. In the first week, the contestants choose the Farmer. Since week 2, the Farmer is chosen by the contestant evicted in the previous week.

=== Nomination process ===
The Farmer of the Week nominates two people (a man and a woman) as the Butlers. The others must decide which Butler is the first to go to the Battle. That person then chooses the second person (from the same sex) for the Battle and also the type of battle (a quiz, extrusion, endurance, sleight). The Battle winner must win two duels. The Battle loser is evicted from the game.

== Finishing order ==
(ages stated are at time of contest)

Contestant	Age	Hometown	Entered	Exited	Status	Finish
Asad Shehada	29	Stavanger	Day 1	Day 6	1st Evicted; Day 6	16th
Leif Haugo Stavenjord	53	Årdalstangen	Day 1	Day 12	2nd Evicted; Day 12	15th
Stine Alice Claussen-Væringstad	22	Drammen	Day 1	Day 18	3rd Evicted; Day 18	14th
Terje Leer	54	Nedre Eggedal	Day 1	Day 24	4th Evicted; Day 24	13th
Vivian Kvarven	47	Bømlo	Day 1	Day 30	5th Evicted; Day 30	12th
Jan Erik Brodahl	60	Oslo	Day 1	Day 42	6th Evicted; Day 42	11th
Marte Flobergseter	22	Lesjaskog	Day 1	Day 48	7th Evicted; Day 48	10th
Jens-Ivar Simonsen	46	Lofoten	Day 25	Day 54	8th Evicted; Day 54	9th
Mathias Scott Pascual	27	Bærums Verk	Day 1	Day 60	9th Evicted; Day 60	8th
Leif Kristian Tindeland	27	Haugesund	Day 1	Day 66	10th Evicted; Day 66	7th
Berit Ivy Junge	31	Averøy	Day 1	Day 66	11th Evicted; Day 66	6th
Silje Momrak	32	Fyresdal	Day 25	Day 69	12th Evicted; Day 69	5th
Vibecke Garnaas	44	Moss	Day 1	Day 69	13th Evicted; Day 69	4th
Agna Hollekve	47	Sogndal	Day 1	Day 71	14th Evicted; Day 71	3rd
Ingebjørg Monique Haram	31	Bærum	Day 1 Day 56	Day 36; Day 72	Runner-Up; Day 72	2nd
Erik Rotihaug	24	Nordfjordeid	Day 1	Day 72	Winner; Day 72	1st

== Torpet ==
After the contestants are eliminated, they are taken to Torpet where they'll be given a second chance to try and re-enter the competition. In addition, 3 new contestants start off on Torpet, hoping to get into the Farm themselves.

Contestant	Age	Hometown	Status	Finish
Asad Shehada	29	Stavanger	Left Competition; Day 9	12th
Leif Haugo Stavenjord	53	Årdalstangen	Left Competition; Day 14	11th
Jasdeep Singh Kalirai	37	Drammen	Left Competition; Day 21	10th
Terje Leer	54	Nedre Eggedal	Left Competition; Day 25	9th
Vivian Kvarven	47	Bømlo	Left Competition; Day 32	8th
Veslemøy Bråten	35	Modum	Lost Duel; Day 38	7th
Stine Alice Claussen-Væringstad	22	Drammen	Lost Duel; Day 42	6th
Jan Erik Brodahl	60	Oslo	Lost Duel; Day 46	5th
Marte Flobergseter	22	Lesjaskog	Lost Duel; Day 51	4th
Eunike Hoksrød	41	Tønsberg	Lost Duel; Day 56	3rd
Frank Tore Aniksdal	49	Vigrestad	Lost Duel; Day 56	2nd
Ingebjørg Monique Haram	31	Bærum	Returned to Farm; Day 56	1st

== Challengers ==
On the fourth week, four challengers come to the farm where they live for two weeks while doing chores and getting to know the other contestants. At the end of the two weeks, the contestants on the farm decide which two are allowed to stay on the farm. The others are eliminated and sent home.

Contestant	Age	Hometown	Status	Finish
Veslemøy Bråten	35	Modum	Not Picked; Day 37	3rd/4th
Børge Sundnes	54	Lyngdal	Not Picked; Day 37	3rd/4th
Silje Momrak	32	Fyresdal	Picked; Day 37	1st/2nd
Jens-Ivar Simonsen	46	Lofoten	Picked; Day 37	1st/2nd

== The game ==
Week	Farmer of the Week	1st Dueler	2nd Dueler	Evicted	Finish
1	Erik	Asad	Mathias	Asad	1st Evicted; Day 6
2	Mathias	Leif Haugo	Leif Kristian	Leif Haugo	2nd Evicted; Day 12
3	Terje	Ingebjørg	Stine Alice	Stine Alice	3rd Evicted; Day 18
4	Berit	Terje	Erik	Terje	4th Evicted; Day 24
5	Jan Erik	Marte	Vivian	Vivian	5th Evicted; Day 30
6	Agna	Marte	Ingebjørg	Ingebjørg	6th Evicted; Day 36
7	Mathias	Erik	Jan Erik	Jan Erik	7th Evicted; Day 42
8	Vibecke	Agna	Marte	Marte	8th Evicted; Day 48
9	Vibecke	Leif Kristian	Jens-Ivar	Jens-Ivar	9th Evicted; Day 54
10	Erik	Mathias	Leif Kristian	Mathias	10th Evicted; Day 60
11	None	All	All	Leif Kristian	11th Evicted; Day 66
11	None	All	All	Berit	12th Evicted; Day 66
11	None	All	All	Silje	13th Evicted; Day 69
11	None	All	All	Vibecke	14th Evicted; Day 69
11	None	All	All	Agna	15th Evicted; Day 71
11	None	All	All	Ingebjørg	Runner-up; Day 72
11	None	All	All	Erik	Winner; Day 72
