= Farmen 2020 (Norway) =

Norwegian TV reality show

- Genre: Reality Show
- Presented by: Mads Hansen
- Country of origin: Norway
- Original language: Norwegian

Production
- Production locations: Ringerike, Norway

Original release
- Network: TV2
- Release: 22 September – 6 December 2020

Related
- Farmen 2019; Farmen 2021

Farmen 2020 (The Farm 2020) was the sixteenth season of the Norwegian version of The Farm reality television show. This season is the first to be hosted by Mads Hansen after the previous host, Gaute Grøtta Grav, stepped down as host. The show premiered on 22 September 2020 on TV2 and ended on 6 December 2020 when Per Gunvald Haugen won against Daniel Viem Årdal in the final duel to become the first challenger to win The Farm.

== Format ==
Fourteen contestants are chosen from the outside world. Each week one contestant is selected the Farmer of the Week. In the first week, the contestants choose the Farmer. Since week 2, the Farmer is chosen by the contestant evicted in the previous week.

=== Nomination process ===
The Farmer of the Week nominates two people (a man and a woman) as the Butlers. The others must decide which Butler is the first to go to the Battle. That person then chooses the second person (from the same sex) for the Battle and also the type of battle (a quiz, extrusion, endurance, sleight). The Battle winner must win two duels. The Battle loser is evicted from the game.

== Finishing order ==
(ages stated are at time of contest)

Contestant	Age	Hometown	Entered	Exited	Status	Finish
Jostein Grav	58	Hobøl	Day 1	Day 6	1st Evicted; Day 6	16th
Sanna Khursheed	32	Stavanger	Day 1	Day 12	2nd Evicted; Day 12	15th
Lene Egeland Hogstad	44	Flekkefjord	Day 1	Day 18	3rd Evicted; Day 18	14th
Nils Kvalsvik	39	Karasjok	Day 1	Day 21	Left Competition; Day 21	13th
Wiktoria Rønning	22	Aurskog	Day 1	Day 24	4th Evicted; Day 24	12th
Raymond Røskeland	36	Osterøy	Day 1	Day 30	5th Evicted; Day 30	11th
Tove Moss Lohne	35	Sandnes	Day 1	Day 36	6th Evicted; Day 36	10th
Inger Cecilie Grønnerød	47	Halden	Day 1	Day 48	7th Evicted; Day 48	9th
Asle Kirkevoll	63	Geilo	Day 25	Day 54	8th Evicted; Day 54	8th
Sindre Nyeng	23	Leksvik	Day 1	Day 60	9th Evicted; Day 60	7th
Kjetil Kirk	27	Oslo	Day 1	Day 63	10th Evicted; Day 63	6th
Thor Haavik	26	Loddefjord	Day 1	Day 65	11th Evicted; Day 65	5th
Karianne Vilde Wølner	26	Drammen	Day 1 Day 49	Day 42; Day 65	12th Evicted; Day 65	4th
Karianne Kopperstad	27	Fosnavåg	Day 1	Day 67	13th Evicted; Day 67	3rd
Daniel Viem Årdal	30	Steinkjer	Day 1	Day 68	Runner-up; Day 68	2nd
Per Gunvald Haugen	45	Gjerstad	Day 25	Day 68	Winner; Day 68	1st

== Torpet ==
After the contestants are eliminated, they are taken to Torpet where they'll be given a second chance to try and re-enter the competition. Three contestants from previous seasons return to compete against the new arrivals to try and fight their way back to earn a spot and return to The Farm.

Contestant	Age	Hometown	Season	Status	Finish
Jostein Grav	58	Hobøl	New	Lost Duel; Day 9	11th
Sanna Khursheed	32	Stavanger	New	Lost Duel; Day 15	10th
Lene Egeland Hogstad	44	Flekkefjord	New	Left Competition; Day 19	9th
Wiktoria Rønning	22	Aurskog	New	Left Competition; Day 25	8th
Raymond Røskeland	36	Osterøy	New	Lost Duel; Day 33	7th
Marianne Lambersøy	49	Stavanger	New	Lost Duel; Day 38	6th
Tove Moss Lohne	35	Sandnes	New	Lost Duel; Day 42	5th
Olav Harald Ulstein	57	Sykkylven	Farmen 2014	Lost Duel; Day 45	4th
Karianne Amlie Wahlstrøm	29	Notodden	Farmen 2017	Lost Duel; Day 49	3rd
Mathias Scott Pascual	28	Bærums Verk	Farmen 2019	Lost Duel; Day 49	2nd
Karianne Vilde Wølner	26	Drammen	New	Returned to Farm; Day 49	1st

== Challengers ==
On the fourth week, three challengers come to the farm where they'll live for one week while doing chores and getting to know the other contestants. At the end of the week, the contestants on the farm decide which one is allowed to stay on the farm and which two fight in a duel to determine who stays on The Farm and who goes home.

Contestant	Age	Hometown	Status	Finish
Marianne Lambersøy	49	Stavanger	Not Picked; Lost Duel; Day 28	3rd
Per Gunvald Haugen	45	Gjerstad	Not Picked; Won Duel; Day 28	2nd
Asle Kirkevoll	63	Geilo	Picked; Day 28	1st

== The game ==
Week	Farmer of the Week	1st Dueler	2nd Dueler	Evicted	Finish
1	Daniel	Jostein	Kjetil	Jostein	1st Evicted; Day 6
2	Nils	Sanna	Inger	Sanna	2nd Evicted; Day 12
3	Karianne K	Tove	Lene	Lene	3rd Evicted; Day 18
4	Inger	Wiktoria	Karianne V	Nils	Left Competition; Day 21
4	Inger	Wiktoria	Karianne V	Wiktoria	4th Evicted; Day 24
5	Kjetil	Daniel	Raymond	Raymond	5th Evicted; Day 30
6	Daniel	Inger	Tove	Tove	6th Evicted; Day 36
7	Inger	Karianne V	Karianne K	Karianne V	7th Evicted; Day 42
8	Daniel	Inger	Karianne K	Inger	8th Evicted; Day 48
9	Sindre	Asle	Kjetil	Asle	9th Evicted; Day 54
10	Per	Sindre	Kjetil	Sindre	10th Evicted; Day 60
11	None	All	All	Kjetil	11th Evicted; Day 63
11	None	All	All	Thor	11th Evicted; Day 65
11	None	All	All	Karianne V	12th Evicted; Day 65
11	None	All	All	Karianne K	13th Evicted; Day 67
11	None	All	All	Daniel	Runner-up; Day 68
11	None	All	All	Per	Winner; Day 68
