= Møllebukta =

Bay in Rogaland, Norway

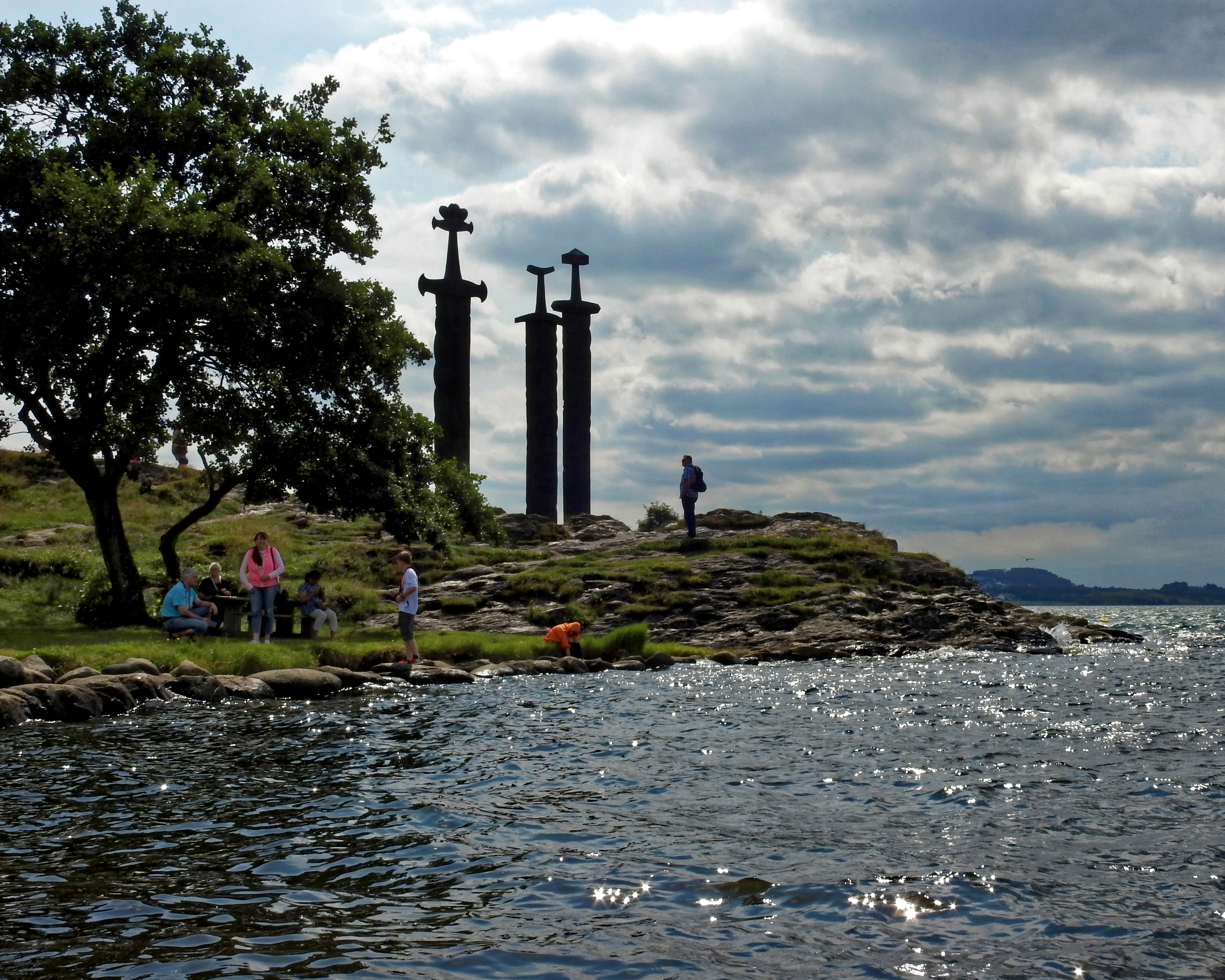
- View of Møllebukta and Sverd i fjell
- Interactive map of the fjord
- Location: Rogaland county, Norway
- Coordinates: 58.97149°N 5.68014°E
- Type: Bay
- Basin countries: Norway
- Max. length: 100 metres (330 ft)

Møllebukta (lit. 'Mill Bay') is a small bay with a sandy beach in the inner part of the Hafrsfjorden in the borough of Madla in the city of Stavanger in the southwestern part of the large Stavanger Municipality in Rogaland county, Norway. It is named after the Møllebekken creek which flows into the bay on the west side of the beach area. The area historically was utilized for running a corn mill. A park was established in the bay in the 18th century. The beach has a length of about 100 metres (330 ft) and it is popular for swimming and sunbathing.

The bronze sculpture Sverd i fjell by Fritz Røed is located at the nearby Mølleberget rock on the east side of the beach.
