= Sunde Church =

Church in Rogaland, Norway

- Sunde kirke
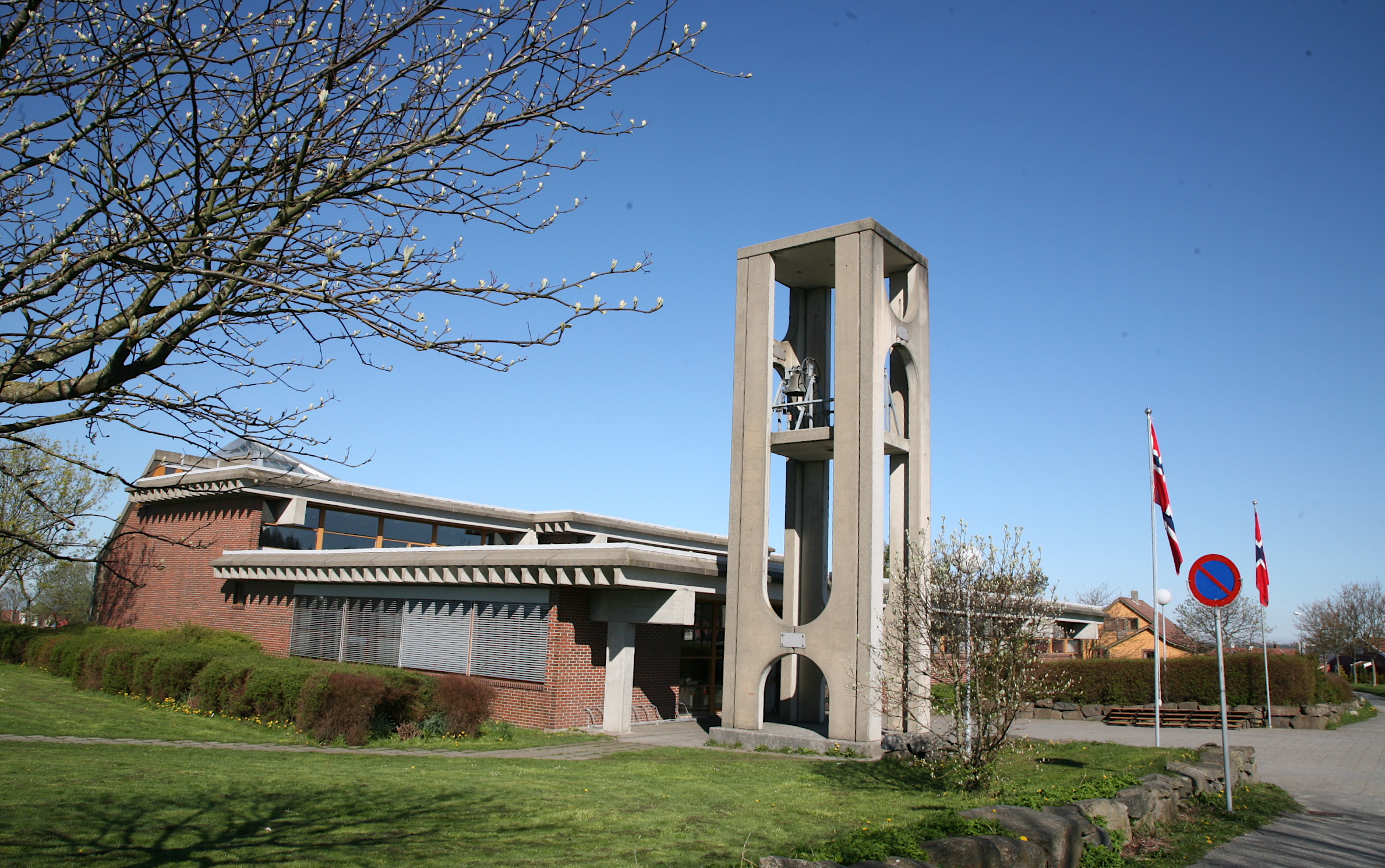
- View of the church
- Sunde Church
- 58.965608°N 5.60972°E
- Location: Stavanger Municipality, Rogaland
- Country: Norway
- Denomination: Church of Norway
- Churchmanship: Evangelical Lutheran

History
- Status: Parish church
- Founded: 1984
- Consecrated: 1984

Architecture
- Functional status: Active
- Architect: Reidar Vollan
- Architectural type: Fan-shaped
- Completed: 1984

Specifications
- Capacity: 650
- Materials: Brick and concrete

Administration
- Diocese: Stavanger bispedømme
- Deanery: Ytre Stavanger prosti
- Parish: Sunde

Sunde Church (Norwegian: Sunde kirke) is a parish church of the Church of Norway in the southern part of the large Stavanger Municipality in Rogaland county, Norway. It is located in the village of Sunde in the borough of Madla in the western part of the city of Stavanger. It is the church for the Sunde parish which is part of the Ytre Stavanger prosti (deanery) in the Diocese of Stavanger. The brick and concrete church was built in a fan-shaped design in 1984 using designs by the architect Reidar Vollan. The church seats about 650 people.

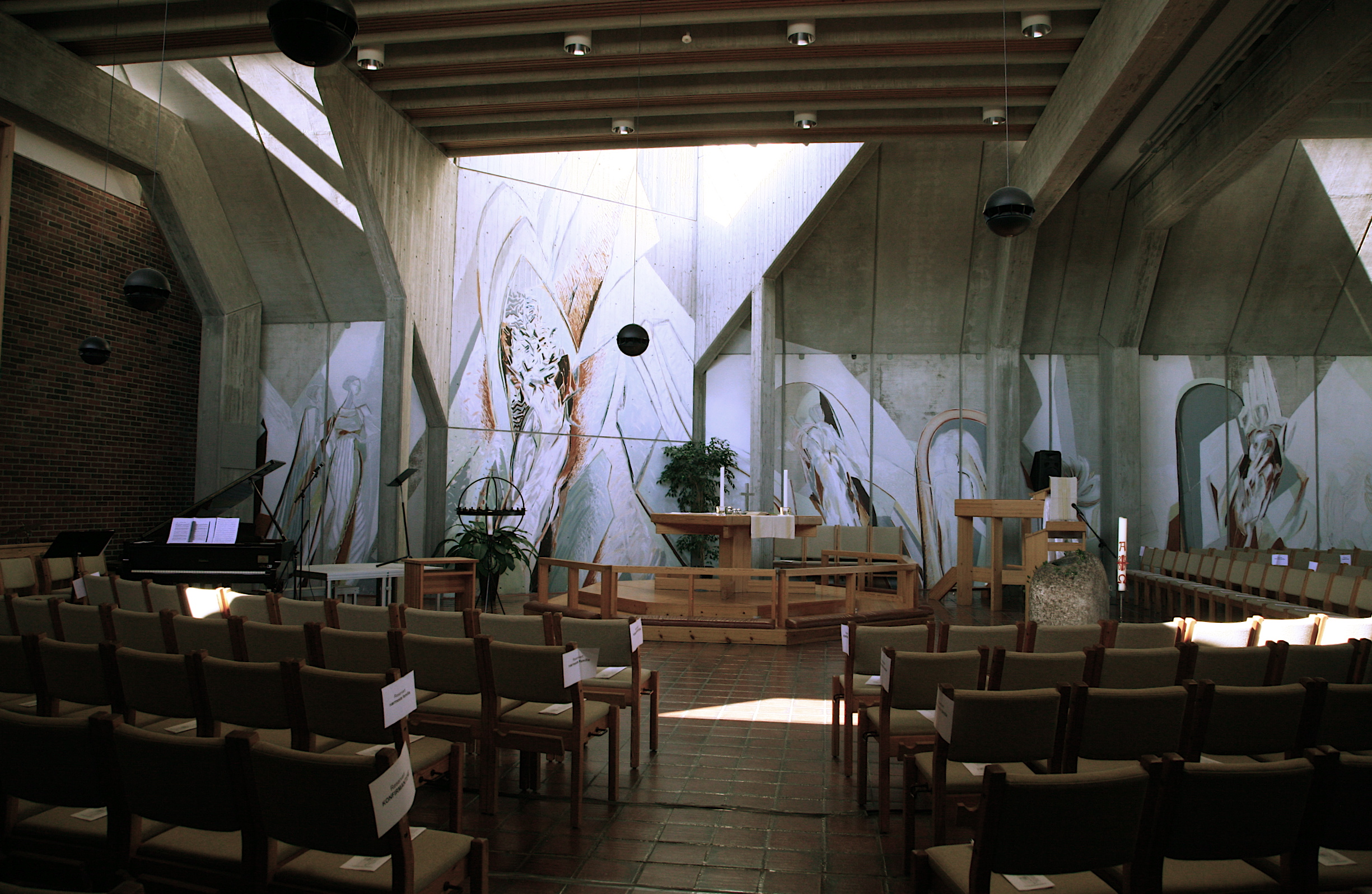
View of the interior

== See also ==
- List of churches in Rogaland
