= Alexander L. Kielland (platform) =

Norwegian semi-submersible drilling rig

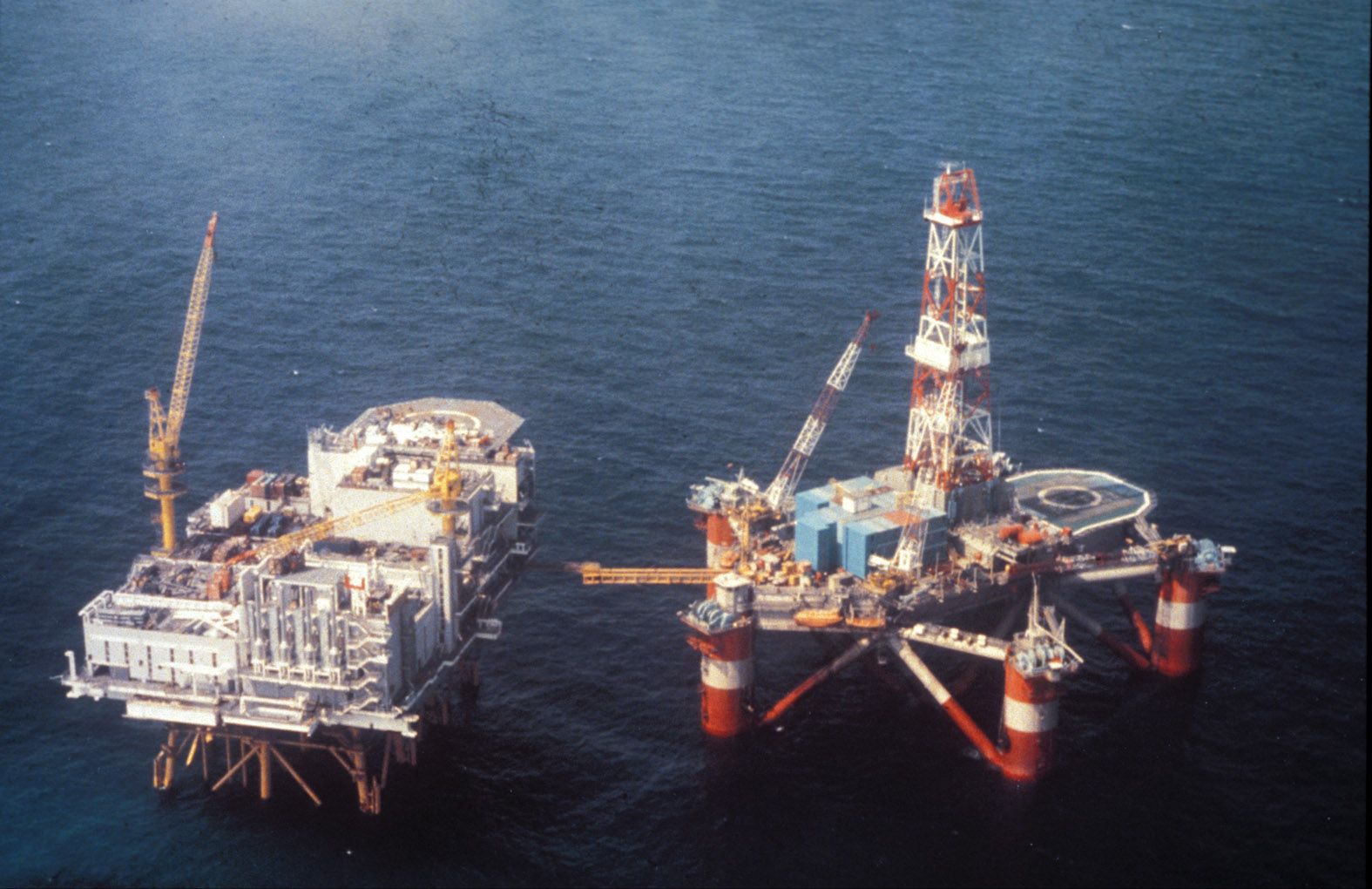
- Edda 2/7C and Alexander L. Kielland (right)

History
- Name: Alexander L. Kielland
- Owner: A. Gowart-Olsen A/S
- Operator: Stavanger Drilling II
- Builder: Compagnie Francaise d’Entreprises Métalliques (CFEM), Dunkerque, France
- Launched: 5 June 1976
- Fate: Capsized / sunk at 56.464839°N 3.104464°E

General characteristics
- Length: 103 m (338 ft)
- Beam: 99 m (325 ft)

Alexander L. Kielland was a Norwegian semi-submersible drilling rig that, on 27 March 1980, capsized in the Ekofisk oil field in the North Sea, killing 123 people. The capsize was the worst disaster in Norwegian waters since the Second World War. The rig, located approximately 320 km east of Dundee, Scotland, was owned by the Stavanger Drilling Company of Norway and was on hire to the U.S. company Phillips Petroleum at the time of the disaster.

== History ==
The rig was built as a mobile drilling unit at a French shipyard, and delivered to Stavanger Drilling in July 1976. The rig was named after the Norwegian writer Alexander Lange Kielland. It could be used for drilling purposes or as a semi-submersible 'flotel' providing living quarters for offshore workers. By 1978, additional accommodation blocks for 386 persons were added. In 1980, the platform was providing offshore accommodation for the production platform Edda 2/7C.

== Accident ==
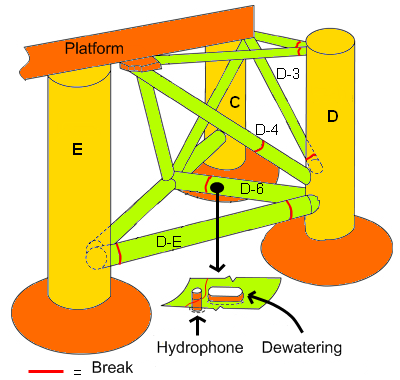
Fractures on the right side of the rig

Early in the evening of 27 March 1980, more than 200 men were off duty in the accommodation on Alexander L. Kielland. Conditions were rainy with dense fog, with the wind gusting to 40 knots (74 km/h) and waves up to 12 metres (39 ft) high. Kielland had just been winched away from the Edda production platform.

Minutes before 18:30, those on board felt a 'sharp crack' followed by 'some kind of trembling'. Suddenly Kielland heeled over 30° and then stabilised. Five of the six anchor cables had broken, the one remaining cable preventing the rig from capsizing. The list continued to increase and at 18:53, the remaining anchor cable snapped and the rig capsized.

130 men were in the mess hall and the cinema when the capsizing occurred. Kielland had seven 50-man lifeboats and twenty 20-man rafts. Four lifeboats were launched, but only one managed to release from the lowering cables. (A safety device did not allow release until the strain was removed from the cables). A fifth lifeboat came adrift and surfaced upside down; its occupants righted it and gathered nineteen men from the water. Two of Kielland's rafts were detached and three men were rescued from them. Two 12-man rafts were thrown from Edda and rescued thirteen survivors. Seven men were taken from the sea by supply boats and seven swam to Edda.

No one was rescued by the standby vessel Silver Pit, which took an hour to reach the scene. Of the 212 people aboard the rig, 123 had been killed, making it the worst disaster in Norwegian offshore history since the Second World War and the deadliest offshore rig disaster of all time up to that point. Most of the workers were from Rogaland.

At around 21:30 hrs. a vessel from the Dutch company Smitlloyd came on location. The crew of this vessel heard people shouting for help. Maneuvering with great caution the Smitlloyd vessel encountered a life raft from the rig and after checking this raft it was found empty. It was very difficult to get this life raft on deck so the crew let the raft go. Two more liferafts were found by the Smitlloyd vessel and they also were found empty. The crew still heard people shouting for help but due to the dense fog nobody was seen. The Smitlloyd vessel stayed on location for several days helping the coordinated rescue operation.

== Investigation ==
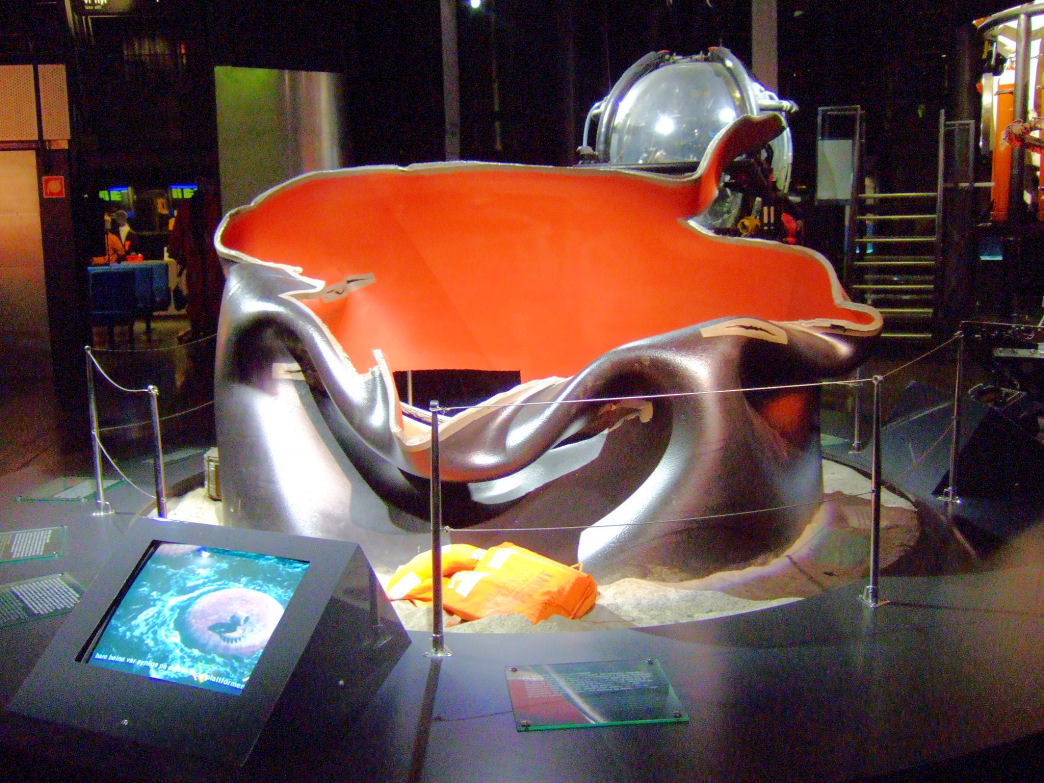
Part of the bracing that failed during the accident (on display in the Norwegian Petroleum Museum)

In March 1981, an investigative report concluded that Kielland collapsed due to a fatigue crack in one of its six bracings (bracing D-6), which connected the collapsed D-leg to the rest of the rig. This was traced to a small 6 mm fillet weld which joined a non-load-bearing flange plate to this D-6 bracing. This flange plate held a sonar device used during drilling operations. The poor profile of the fillet weld contributed to a reduction in its fatigue strength.

Further, the investigation found considerable amounts of lamellar tearing in the flange plate and cold cracks in the underlying groove weld. Cold cracks in the welds, increased stress concentrations due to the weakened flange plate, the poor weld profile, and cyclical stresses (which would be common in the North Sea) seemed to collectively play a role in the rig's collapse. Judging by paint on part of the fractured surface, the crack was probably due to improper work during the rig's construction in 1976. Other major structural elements then failed in sequence, destabilising the entire structure. The design of the rig was flawed owing to the absence of structural redundancy.

== Salvage operation ==
Kielland was recovered in 1983 at the third attempt. The rig was scuttled later that year in the Nedstrand Fjord after a search for missing bodies had been completed, as well as several tests to determine the cause of the disaster.

== Aftermath ==
In response to the Kielland disaster, North Sea offshore installations tightened their command organization, identifying a clear authority who would order abandonment in case of emergency. The fourteen minutes between initial failure of the leg and the rig's eventual capsize left a window in which most of the personnel on board could have escaped, had a more effective command structure been in place. These revised command structures, similar to conventional shipping command structures, are now frequently put into use when vessels lose anchorage in storm conditions or when fixed installations are threatened by out-of-control vessels.

The failure to deploy lifeboats led to new legislation regarding on-load release hooks for lifeboats on oil rigs. As a consequence, the International Maritime Organization issued a requirement for all lifeboats on merchant ships to be fitted with hooks that could be released even when they were under load.

A memorial to the disaster was erected in 1986 on the coast of Kvernevik. Named "Broken Chain" (Norwegian: brutt lenke), the memorial depicts a broken chain link. It weighs about five tonnes (5.5 tons) and stands four metres (13 ft) high.

After a study published in January 2025 by the University of Stavanger found that the families and survivors were let down by the original investigations, the Norwegian government apologised and funded a study on the impact of the disaster on those affected. In June 2025 the Norwegian Storting voted to award compensation to the families and survivors.

== Similar incidents ==
Not long after Kielland capsized, her sister rig, Henrik Ibsen, suffered a jammed ballast valve, causing her to list twenty degrees, but was later righted again. Approximately eighteen months later, Ocean Ranger capsized in similar weather conditions off the Newfoundland coast. An investigation into the cause of the Ocean Ranger disaster by the United States Coast Guard established that structural failure was not a factor.

== In popular culture ==
A fictionalised account of the disaster was first broadcast in Norway in 2018 in the drama series Lykkeland (State of Happiness), a Norwegian period drama television series about the discovery of oil in the North Sea, and subsequent growth of the petroleum industry in Stavanger. It was broadcast in the UK in February 2022 by BBC Four. The disaster and subsequent rescue operation were spread over episodes seven and eight of Series Two (Mayday and 123 respectively).

The political approach was portrayed in the NRK1 series Makta (Power Play). It was broadcast in Norway in 2023.
