= Sunde, Stavanger =

Neighborhood of Stavanger, Norway

Coordinates: 58.9622°N 5.6160°E

Sunde is a neighborhood (delområde) in the city of Stavanger which lies in the southwestern part of the large municipality of Stavanger in Rogaland county, Norway. It is located in the borough of Madla, located along the Hafrsfjorden, just south of Kvernevik. The neighborhood has a population of 4,104 which is distributed over an area of 5.74 square kilometres (1,420 acres). Sunde Church is located in this neighborhood.
