= Madlamark Church =

Church in Rogaland, Norway

- Madlamark kirke
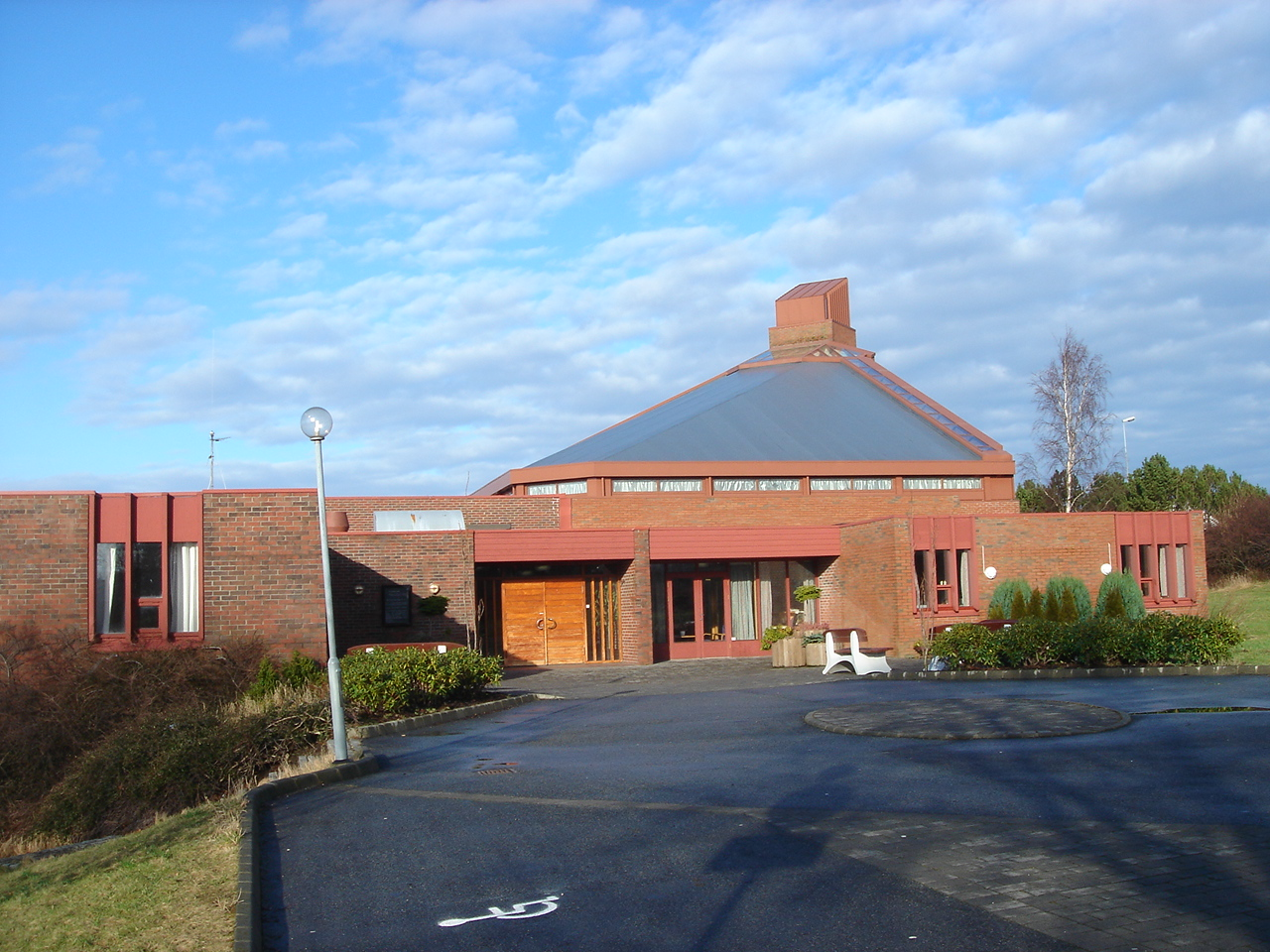
- View of the church
- Madlamark Church
- 58.942675°N 5.681299°E
- Location: Stavanger Municipality, Rogaland
- Country: Norway
- Denomination: Church of Norway
- Churchmanship: Evangelical Lutheran

History
- Status: Parish church
- Founded: 1976
- Consecrated: 1976

Architecture
- Functional status: Active
- Architect: Toralf Kaada
- Architectural type: Fan-shaped
- Completed: 1976

Specifications
- Capacity: 600
- Materials: Brick

Administration
- Diocese: Stavanger bispedømme
- Deanery: Ytre Stavanger prosti
- Parish: Madlamark

Madlamark Church (Norwegian: Madlamark kirke) is a parish church of the Church of Norway in the southern part of the large Stavanger Municipality in Rogaland county, Norway. It is located in the Madlamark neighborhood in the borough of Madla in the western part of the city of Stavanger. It is the church for the Madlamark parish which is part of the Ytre Stavanger prosti (deanery) in the Diocese of Stavanger. The large, brick church was built in a fan-shaped design in 1976 using designs by the architect Toralf Kaada. The church seats about 600 people.

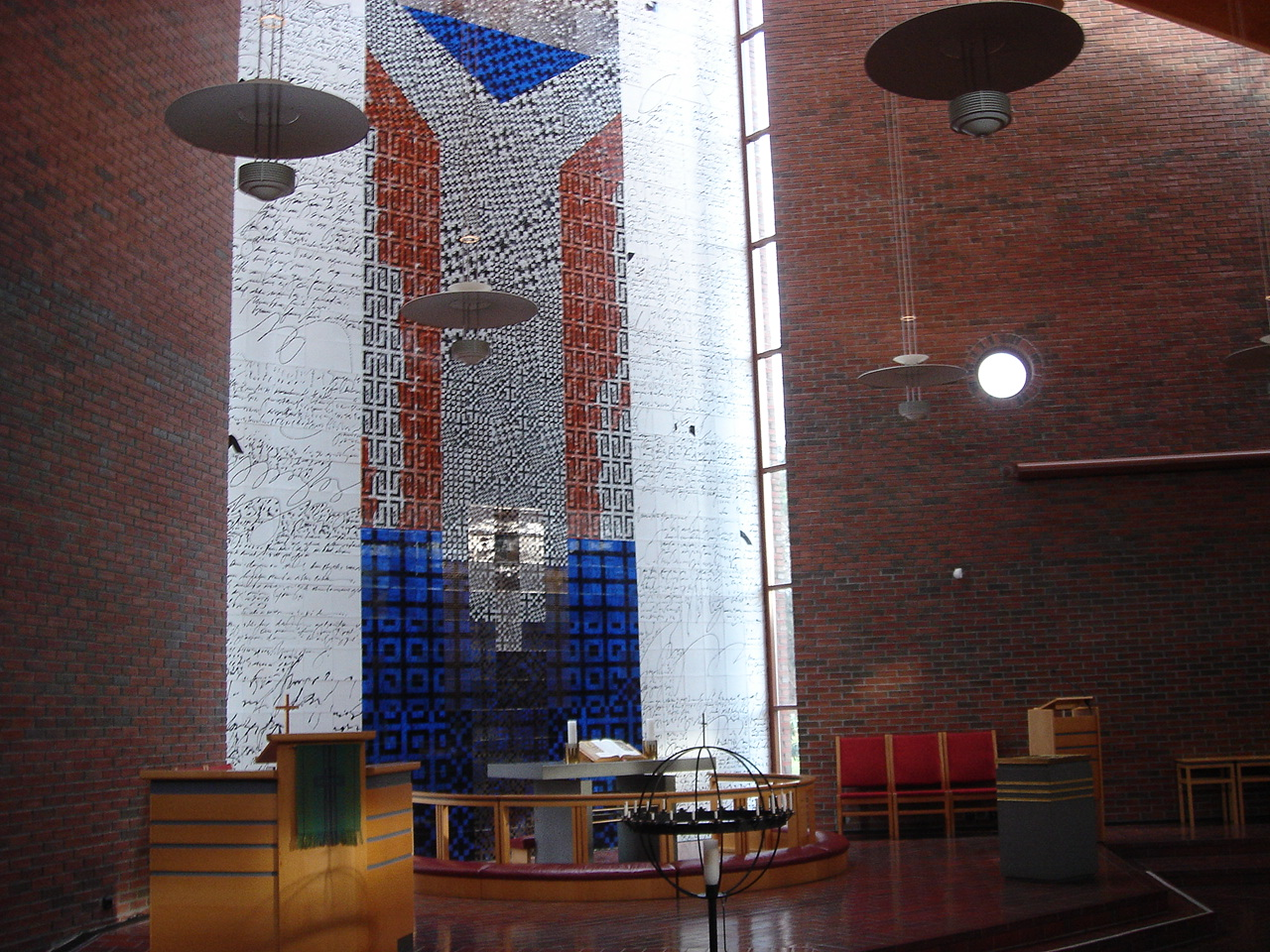
View of the interior

== See also ==
- List of churches in Rogaland
