= Kjotve the Rich =

Norwegian petty king

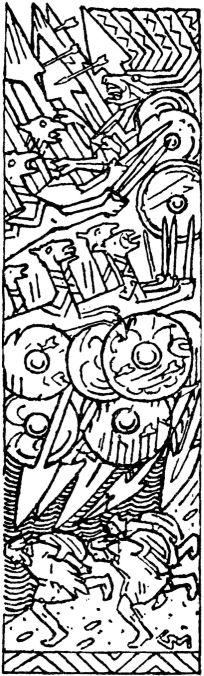
Slaget i Hafrsfjord by Gerhard Munthe Heimskringla 1899

Kjotve the Rich (Old Norse: Kjǫtvi hinn auðgi, Norwegian: Kjøtve den Rike) was a king of Agder, then one of the petty kingdoms of Norway during the late 9th century. Kjotve led the western Norwegian kings against King Harald Fairhair (Harald Hårfagre) at the Battle of Hafrsfjord (Slaget i Hafrsfjorden). Defeated by Harald, Kjotve fled; many of his allies were killed in the battle. His son Thorir Haklang was a berserker who fell during the Battle of Hafrsfjord.
