= Mads Hansen (footballer, born 1984) =

Norwegian footballer

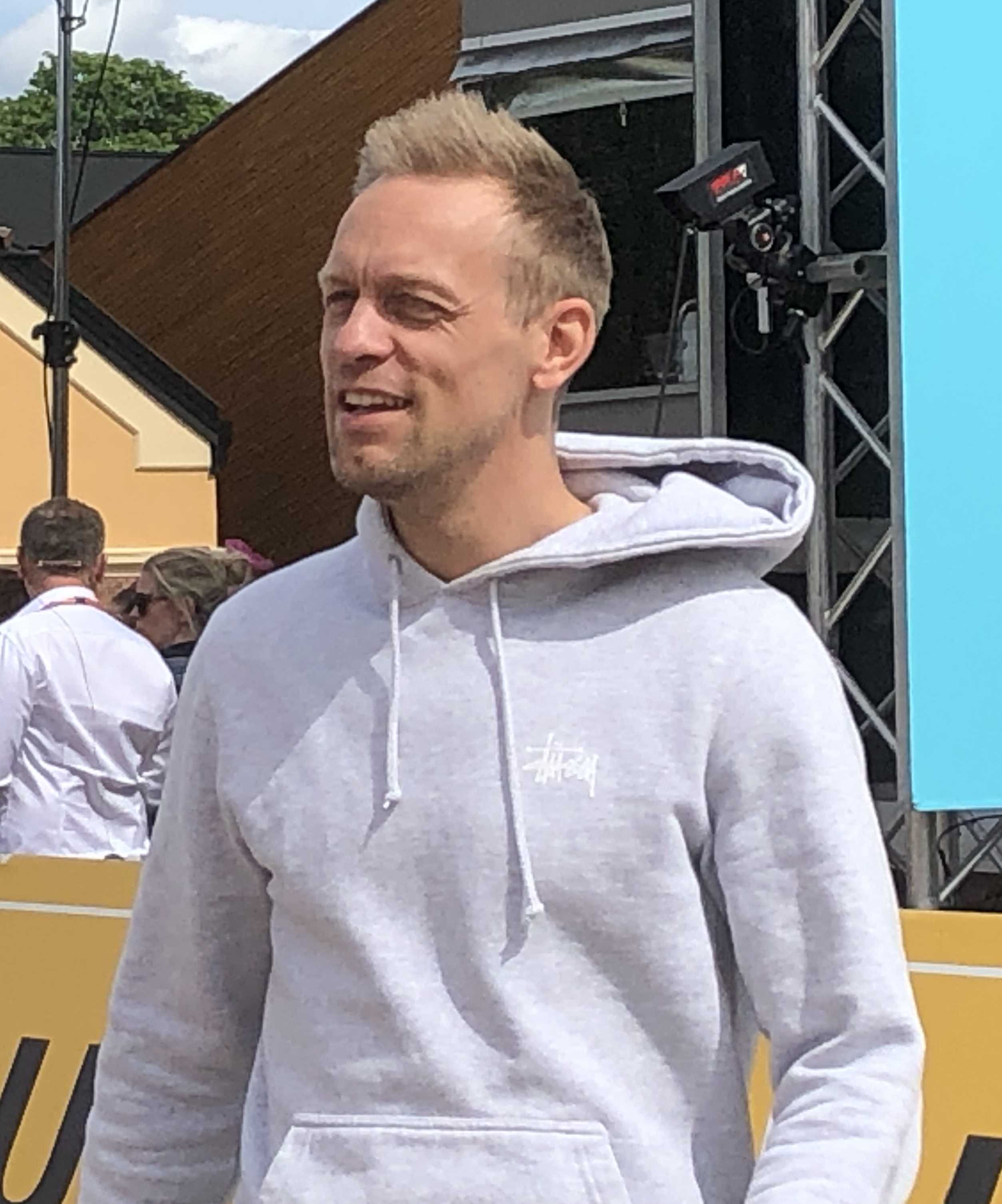
- Hansen (2019)

Personal information
- Full name: Mads Andre Hansen
- Date of birth: 2 February 1984 (age 42)
- Place of birth: Lier, Norway
- Height: 1.86 m (6 ft 1 in)
- Positions: Right-back; midfielder; left winger

Youth career
- Lier

Senior career*
Years	Team	Apps	(Gls)
2002–2003	Strømsgodset		
2004–2010	Mjøndalen		
2011–2012	Fredrikstad	45	(2)
2013–2018	Mjøndalen	145	(4)
- * Club domestic league appearances and goals

Mads Andre Hansen (born 2 February 1984) is a former Norwegian footballer, and a one-hit wonder with the single "Sommerkroppen". He has previously played for Lier, Strømsgodset, Fredrikstad Fotballklubb and Mjøndalen IF. He is also an influencer, and TV-presenter.

Hansen was in 2009 awarded NRK's Gullballen for his goal for Mjøndalen against Hønefoss. He played 45 matches for Fredrikstad in Tippeligaen between 2011 and 2012

== Club career ==
Hansen was born in Drammen and grew up in Lier, where he played for Lier before he joined Strømsgodset. He got one appearance for the team in 2002 before he left for the Third Division side Mjøndalen ahead of the 2004-season.

Hansen was one of the profiles on the team when Mjøndalen earned promotion to the First Division. On 25 October 2009 he scored the match-winning goal in the 2-1 win against league-leaders Hønefoss, a victory that saved Mjøndalen from relegation. Hansen's goal, which was a solo-raid from his own half, have been compared to Maradona's goal against England in the 1986 FIFA World Cup, and was woted Goal of the Year during NRK's Gullballen.

Hansen was wanted by Tippeligaen side Fredrikstad during the summer of 2010, and offered between 400,000 and 500,000 NOK for the midfielder position. This was rejected by Mjøndalen, and when Fredrikstad got another bid rejected after the 2010 season, which according to Drammens Tidende was 325,000 NOK, Hansen considered paying 50,000 NOK out of his own pocket to make his dream to play in Tippeligaen come true. Hansen eventually signed a three-year contract with Fredrikstad in January 2011, after external investors paid what Fredrikstad couldn't afford to pay for Hansen.

Hansen scored a goal in his debut for Fredrikstad, and was a regular for the team in the first half of the 2011 season. He only started four matches in the 2012 season due to an injury, when the team got relegated from the Tippeligaen. He played a total of 35 matches and scored two goals for Fredrikstad in Tippeligaen. Ahead of the 2013 season, Hansen rejoined his old team Mjøndalen, and signed a three-year contract with the club.

On April 27, 2018, Hansen announced he would retire from professional football, due to lack of motivation.

== Career statistics ==
Appearances and goals by club, season and competition
Club	Season	League			Cup		Other		Total	
Club	Season	Division	Apps	Goals	Apps	Goals	Apps	Goals	Apps	Goals
Mjøndalen	2009	1. divisjon	29	3	1	1	—		30	4
Mjøndalen	2010	1. divisjon	27	3	3	0	—		30	3
Mjøndalen	Total		56	6	4	1	—		60	7
Fredrikstad	2011	Eliteserien	30	2	6	0	—		36	2
Fredrikstad	2012	Eliteserien	15	0	2	0	—		17	0
Fredrikstad	Total		45	2	8	0	—		53	2
Mjøndalen	2013	1. divisjon	29	1	4	0	2 (Note: Appearance(s) in promotion play-offs)	0	35	1
Mjøndalen	2014	1. divisjon	29	0	2	0	4	0	35	0
Mjøndalen	2015	Eliteserien	30	1	4	0	—		34	1
Mjøndalen	2016	1. divisjon	22	0	2	0	1	0	25	0
Mjøndalen	2017	1. divisjon	30	1	4	0	2	0	36	1
Mjøndalen	2018	1. divisjon	5	1	0	0	—		5	1
Mjøndalen	Total		145	4	16	0	9	0	170	4
Career total			246	12	28	1	9	0	283	13

== Television ==
In May 2020, it was announced that Hansen would take over from Gaute Grøtta Grav as host of the TV 2 program Farmen, and he has hosted the program since season 16, which aired in the fall of that year. On March 8, TV 2's program editor Kathrine Haldorsen announced that Hansen would step down as host of Farmen after only two seasons.

For The Farm and the VGTV series Ikke lov å le på hytta he was one of four finalists for the audience award during the Gullruten 2021.

Hansen is the host of Ikke lov å le på hytta on VGTV, which brings together well-known Norwegian comedians in a cabin with only one rule - you are not allowed to laugh. Four seasons have been published and comedians such as Morten Ramm, Calle Hellevang-Larsen, Else Kåss Furuseth, Linn Skåber and Martha Leivestad are some of those who have been on the VGTV program. Ikke lov å le på hytta has been a huge success with over half a million viewers in season 2 and 80,000 VG plus sales to be able to "binge" the entire series. The third season of the TV series has been nominated for the Gullruten 2023 in the category Best Comedy Program.

Mads Hansen has been the host of the TV 2 series Forræder, which is the Norwegian for The Traitors since 2022. For the series, he was nominated for the Gullruten Award in both 2023 and 2024 in the category of best host – reality and lifestyle.
