= Farmen 2018 (Norway) =

- Season 14
- Presented by: Gaute Grøtta Grav
- No. of days: 75
- No. of contestants: 16
- Winner: Tonje Frøystad Garvik
- Runner-up: Kjetil Nørstebø
- Location: Grue Municipality, Norway

Release
- Original network: TV 2
- Original release: 25 September – 9 December 2018

Season chronology
- ← Previous; Farmen 2017 Next → Farmen 2019

Farmen 2018 (The Farm 2018) was the 14th season of the Norwegian version of The Farm reality television show. The show premiered on 25 September 2018 on TV 2 and ended on 9 December 2018.

== Format ==
Fourteen contestants are chosen from the outside world. Each week one contestant is selected the Farmer of the Week. In the first week, the contestants choose the Farmer. Since week 2, the Farmer is chosen by the contestant evicted in the previous week.

=== Nomination process ===
The Farmer of the Week nominates two people (a man and a woman) as the Butlers. The others must decide which Butler is the first to go to the Battle. That person then chooses the second person (from the same sex) for the Battle and also the type of battle (a quiz, extrusion, endurance, sleight). The Battle winner must win two duels. The Battle loser is evicted from the game.

Farmen 2018
- Season 2018
- No. of days: 75
- No. of housemates: 16
- Winner: Tonje
- Runner-up: Kjetil

Series chronology
- ← Previous; Farmen 2017 (Norway) Next → Farmen 2019 (Norway)

== Finishing order ==
(ages stated are at time of contest)

| Contestant | Age | Hometown | Entered | Exited | Status | Finish |
|---|---|---|---|---|---|---|
| Vidar Johansen | 46 | Follebu | Day 1 | Day 6 | 1st Evicted; Day 6 | 16th |
| Kim Stefan Jenssen | 40 | Bodø | Day 1 | Day 7 | Left Competition; Day 7 | 15th |
| Live Solheimdal | 21 | Molde | Day 1 | Day 8 | Left Competition; Day 8 | 14th |
| Charlie Stuart | 32 | Horn Island, Australia | Day 1 | Day 12 | 2nd Evicted; Day 12 | 13th |
| Jørgen Ringstad | 62 | Dagali | Day 1 | Day 18 | 3rd Evicted; Day 18 | 12th |
| Paal Nygård | 27 | Fredrikstad | Day 1 | Day 24 | 4th Evicted; Day 24 | 11th |
| Håkan Pettersson | 54 | Eidsvoll | Day 25 | Day 32 | 5th Evicted; Day 32 | 10th |
| Andrea Badendyck | 23 | Oslo | Day 1 | Day 47 | 7th Evicted; Day 47 | 9th |
| Irene Halle | 35 | Stjørdal | Day 1 | Day 54 | 8th Evicted; Day 54 | 8th |
| Nikolai Aspen | 22 | Tromsø | Day 1 | Day 61 | 9th Evicted; Day 61 | 7th |
| Sølvi Monsen | 55 | Alta | Day 1 Day 56 | Day 39; Day 68 | 10th Evicted; Day 68 | 6th |
| Dineke Polderman | 46 | Stavanger | Day 1 | Day 72 | 11th Evicted; Day 72 | 5th |
| Lene Sleperud | 29 | Oslo | Day 1 | Day 72 | 12th Evicted; Day 72 | 4th |
| Karianne Amundsen | 27 | Oslo | Day 25 | Day 74 | 13th Evicted; Day 74 | 3rd |
| Kjetil Nørstebø | 28 | Uvdal | Day 1 | Day 75 | Runner-up; Day 75 | 2nd |
| Tonje Frøystad Garvik | 29 | Ulsteinvik | Day 1 | Day 75 | Winner; Day 75 | 1st |

== Torpet ==
For the first time in Farmen's history, contestants will be given a second chance to try and re-enter the competition. After their elimination, they are taken to Torpet where they will meet three former contestants of Farmen where the four of them will compete in a duel, where the loser is eliminated from the game. After a certain number of weeks, the last competitor to remain in Torpet will win a spot back into the game.

| Contestant | Season | Age | Hometown | Status | Finish |
|---|---|---|---|---|---|
| Andreas Nørstrud | Farmen 2012 | 34 | Tuddal | Lost Duel; Day 7 | 11th |
| Camilla Cox Barfot | Farmen 2017 | 33 | Trondheim | Lost Duel; Day 14 | 10th |
| Jørgen Ringstad | New | 62 | Drammen | Medically evacuated Day 19 | 9th |
| Paal Nygård | New | 27 | Fredrikstad | Lost Duel; Day 26 | 8th |
| Håkan Pettersson | New | 54 | Eidsvoll | Left Competition; Day 33 | 7th |
| Vidar Johansen | New | 46 | Follebu | Lost Duel; Day 40 | 6th |
| Andrea Badendyck | New | 23 | Oslo | Left Competition; Day 48 | 5th |
| Irene Halle | New | 35 | Stjørdal | Lost Duel; Day 55 | 4th |
| Charlie Stuart | New | 32 | Horn Island, Australia | Lost Duel; Day 56 | 3rd |
| Lasse Bergseter | Farmen 2016 | 51 | Stokke | Lost Duel; Day 56 | 2nd |
| Sølvi Monsen | New | 55 | Alta | Returned to Farm; Day 56 | 1st |

== Torpet duels ==
| Week | Dueler(s) | Evicted | Finish |
|---|---|---|---|
| 2 | Andreas & Vidar | Andreas | Lost Duel; Day 7 |
| 3 | Camilla & Charlie | Camilla | Lost Duel; Day 14 |
| 4 | None | Jørgen | Medically evacuated Day 19 |
| 5 | Lasse & Paal | Paal | Lost Duel; Day 26 |
| 6 | None | Håkan | Left Competition; Day 33 |
| 7 | Sølvi & Vidar | Vidar | Lost Duel; Day 40 |
| 8 | None | Andrea | Left Competition; Day 48 |
| 9 | Charlie & Irene | Irene | Lost Duel; Day 55 |
| 9 | Charlie, Lasse & Sølvi | Charlie & Lasse | Lost Duel; Day 56 |

== Challengers ==
Since 2014, during the fourth/fifth week, four challenges come to the farm where they live for one/two weeks. At the end, the contestants on the farm decide which two are allowed to stay on the farm. The others are eliminated and sent home.

| Contestant | Age | Hometown | Status | Finish |
|---|---|---|---|---|
| Anneli Guttorm | 45 | Nesseby | Medically evacuated Day 25 | 4th |
| Thomas Einarson Fjelde | 31 | Jørpeland | Not Picked; Day 28 | 3rd |
| Håkan Pettersson | 54 | Eidsvoll | Picked; Day 28 | 1st/2nd |
| Karianne Amundsen | 27 | Oslo | Picked; Day 28 | 1st/2nd |

== The game ==
| Week | Farmer of the Week | 1st Dueler | 2nd Dueler | Evicted | Finish |
|---|---|---|---|---|---|
| 1 | Tonje | Vidar | Nikolai | Vidar | 1st Evicted; Day 6 |
| 2 | Nikolai | Charlie | Jørgen | Kim | Left Competition; Day 7 |
| 2 | Nikolai | Charlie | Jørgen | Line | Left Competition; Day 8 |
| 2 | Nikolai | Charlie | Jørgen | Charlie | 2nd Evicted; Day 12 |
| 3 | Lene | Jørgen | Kjetil | Jørgen | 3rd Evicted; Day 18 |
| 4 | Kjetil | Paal | Nikolai | Paal | 4th Evicted; Day 24 |
| 5 | Nikolai | Håkan | Kjetil | Håkan | 5th Evicted; Day 32 |
| 6 | Kjetil | Irene | Sølvi | Sølvi | 6th Evicted; Day 39 |
| 7 | Nikolai | Irene | Andrea | Andrea | 7th Evicted; Day 47 |
| 8 | Dineke | Irene | Karianne | Irene | 8th Evicted; Day 54 |
| 9 | Tonje | Nikolai | Kjetil | Nikolai | 9th Evicted; Day 61 |
| 10 | Kjetil | Sølvi | Lene | Sølvi | 10th Evicted; Day 68 |
| 11 | None | All | All | Dineke | 11th Evicted; Day 72 |
| 11 | None | All | All | Lene | 12th Evicted; Day 72 |
| 11 | None | All | All | Karianne | 13th Evicted; Day 74 |
| 11 | None | All | All | Kjetil | Runner-up; Day 75 |
| 11 | None | All | All | Tonje | Winner; Day 75 |
