= Farmen 2017 (Norway) =

- Season 13
- Presented by: Gaute Grøtta Grav
- No. of days: 74
- No. of contestants: 16
- Winner: Halvor Sveen
- Runner-up: Eunike Hoksrød
- Location: Flostaøya, Norway

Release
- Original network: TV 2
- Original release: 25 September – 10 December 2017

Season chronology
- ← Previous; Farmen 2016 Next → Farmen 2018

Farmen 2017 (The Farm 2017) is the thirteenth season of the Norwegian version of The Farm reality television show. This season takes place on a farm located on the island of Flostaøya located in Arendal Municipality in Norway. The season premiered on TV 2 on 25 September 2017 and concluded on 10 December 2017 where Halvor Sveen won in the final duel against Eunike Hoksrød to win the title of Farmen 2017.

== Format ==
Fourteen contestants are chosen from the outside world. Each week one contestant is selected the Farmer of the Week. In the first week, the contestants choose the Farmer. Since week 2, the Farmer is chosen by the contestant evicted in the previous week.

=== Nomination process ===
The Farmer of the Week nominates two people (a man and a woman) as the Butlers. The others must decide which Butler is the first to go to the Battle. That person then chooses the second person (from the same sex) for the Battle and also the type of battle (a quiz, extrusion, endurance, sleight). The Battle winner must win two duels. The Battle loser is evicted from the game.

== Finishing order ==
(ages stated are at time of contest)

| Contestant | Age | Residence | Entered | Exited | Status | Finish |
|---|---|---|---|---|---|---|
| Line Suomalainen | 55 | Sør-Varanger | Day 1 | Day 7 | 1st Evicted; Day 7 | 16th |
| Thale Myhre | 24 | Oslo | Day 1 | Day 9 | Left Competition; Day 9 | 15th |
| Vidar Helseth | 38 | Kvinesdal | Day 1 | Day 14 | 2nd Evicted; Day 14 | 14th |
| Mats Beylergaard Brennemo | 28 | Bø | Day 1 | Day 18 | Left Competition; Day 18 | 13th |
| Sunniva Dortea Thorsen | 30 | Bø | Day 1 | Day 21 | 3rd Evicted; Day 21 | 12th |
| Trym Nygaard Løken | 23 | Oslo | Day 1 | Day 28 | 4th Evicted; Day 28 | 11th |
| Tom Evensen | 42 | Mesnali | Day 1 | Day 35 | 5th Evicted; Day 35 | 10th |
| Bjørn-Erik Fatnes | 22 | Oslo | Day 23 | Day 42 | 6th Evicted; Day 42 | 9th |
| Karoline Røed | 30 | Løten | Day 23 | Day 49 | 7th Evicted; Day 49 | 8th |
| Geir Magne Haukås | 46 | Kabelvåg | Day 1 | Day 56 | 8th Evicted; Day 56 | 7th |
| Karianne Amlie Wahlstrøm | 26 | Oslo | Day 1 | Day 63 | 9th Evicted; Day 63 | 6th |
| Kristian Krubel Djupnes | 21 | Gjøvik | Day 1 | Day 70 | 10th Evicted; Day 70 | 5th |
| Camilla Cox Barfot | 31 | Trondheim | Day 1 | Day 72 | 11th Evicted; Day 72 | 4th |
| Amalie Snøløs | 21 | Birkeland | Day 1 | Day 73 | 12th Evicted; Day 73 | 3rd |
| Eunike Hoksrød | 39 | Tønsberg | Day 1 | Day 74 | Runner-Up; Day 74 | 2nd |
| Halvor Sveen | 47 | Rendalen | Day 1 | Day 74 | Winner; Day 74 | 1st |

== Challengers ==
On the fourth week, three challengers come to the farm where they'll live for one week while doing chores and getting to know the other contestants. At the end of the week, the contestants on the farm decide which one is allowed to stay on the farm and which two fight in a duel to determine who stays on The Farm and who goes home.

| Contestant | Age | Residence | Status | Finish |
|---|---|---|---|---|
| Liv Rannveig Tørstad | 33 | Valdres | Not Picked; Day 27 | 3rd/4th |
| Thomas Ravi Håland | 39 | Manger | Not Picked; Day 27 | 3rd/4th |
| Karoline Røed | 30 | Løten | Picked; Day 27 | 1st/2nd |
| Bjørn-Erik Fatnes | 22 | Oslo | Picked; Day 27 | 1st/2nd |

== The game ==
| Week | Farmer of the Week | 1st Dueler | 2nd Dueler | Evicted | Finish |
|---|---|---|---|---|---|
| 1 | Kristian | Line | Sunniva | Line | 1st Evicted; Day 7 |
| 2 | Mats | Vidar | Halvor | Thale | Left Competition; Day 9 |
| 2 | Mats | Vidar | Halvor | Vidar | 2nd Evicted; Day 14 |
| 3 | Camilla | Amalie | Sunniva | Mats | Left Competition; Day 18 |
| 3 | Camilla | Amalie | Sunniva | Sunniva | 3rd Evicted; Day 21 |
| 4 | Halvor | Kristian | Trym | Trym | 4th Evicted; Day 28 |
| 5 | Karianne | Geir | Tom | Tom | 5th Evicted; Day 35 |
| 6 | Geir | Halvor | Bjørn-Erik | Bjørn-Erik | 6th Evicted; Day 42 |
| 7 | Amalie | Eunike | Karoline | Karoline | 7th Evicted; Day 49 |
| 8 | Karianne | Geir | Kristian | Geir | 8th Evicted; Day 56 |
| 9 | Amalie | Karianne | Eunike | Karianne | 9th Evicted; Day 63 |
| 10 | Eunike | Halvor | Kristian | Kristian | 10th Evicted; Day 70 |
| 11 | None | All | All | Camilla | 11th Evicted; Day 72 |
| 11 | None | All | All | Amalie | 12th Evicted; Day 73 |
| 11 | None | All | All | Eunike | Runner-up; Day 74 |
| 11 | None | All | All | Halvor | Winner; Day 74 |
