= Revheim Church =

Church in Rogaland, Norway

- Revheim kirke
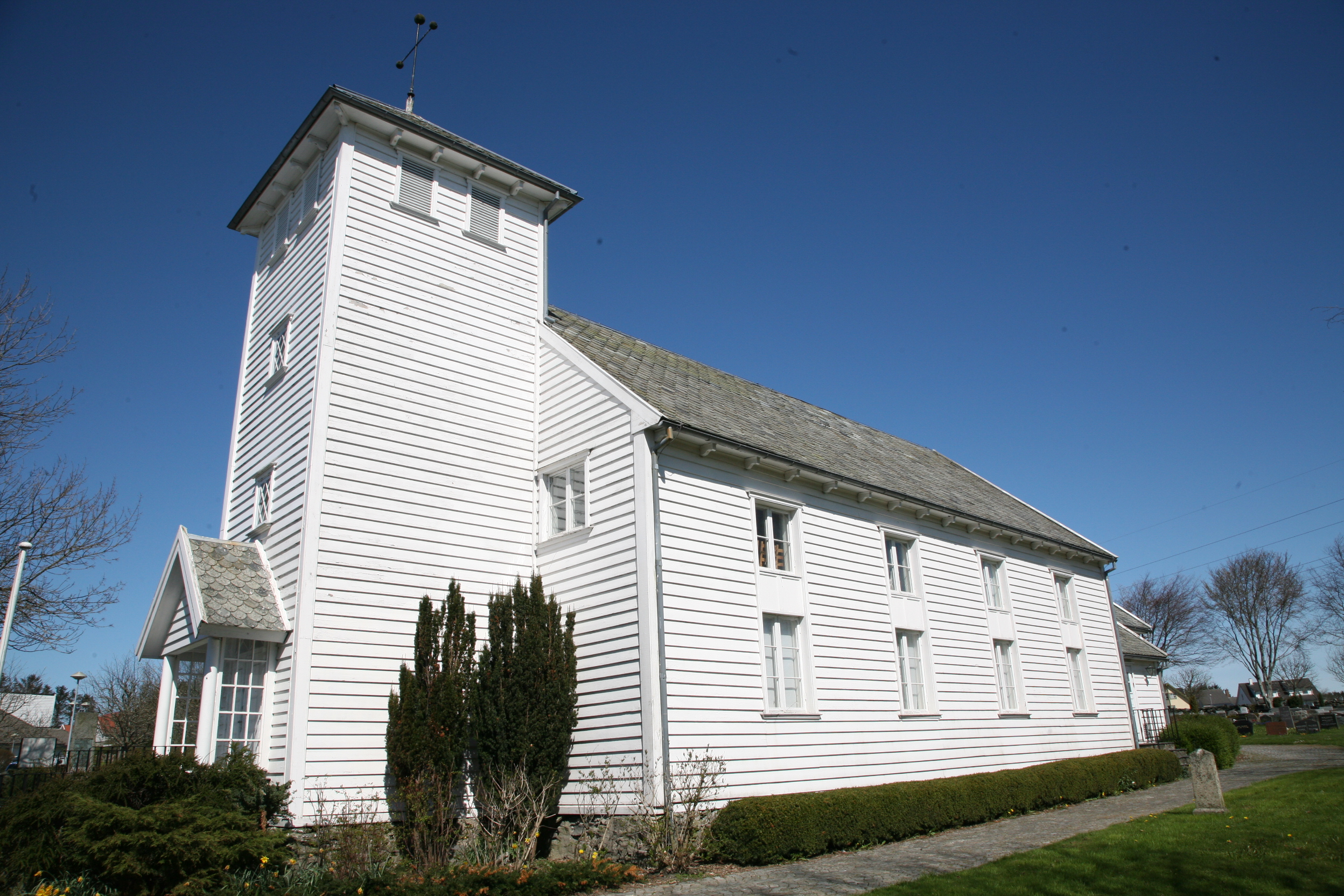
- View of the church
- Revheim Church
- 58.952286°N 5.644057°E
- Location: Stavanger Municipality, Rogaland
- Country: Norway
- Denomination: Church of Norway
- Churchmanship: Evangelical Lutheran

History
- Status: Parish church
- Founded: 1864
- Consecrated: 1864

Architecture
- Functional status: Active
- Architect: Hans Linstow
- Architectural type: Long church
- Completed: 1864

Specifications
- Capacity: 300
- Materials: Wood

Administration
- Diocese: Stavanger bispedømme
- Deanery: Ytre Stavanger prosti
- Parish: Hafrsfjord
- Norwegian Cultural Heritage Site
- Type: Church
- Status: Not protected
- ID: 85291

Revheim Church (Norwegian: Revheim kirke) is a parish church of the Church of Norway in the southern part of the large Stavanger Municipality in Rogaland county, Norway. It is located in village of Kvernevik in the borough of Madla in the western part of the city of Stavanger. It is the church for the Hafrsfjord parish which is part of the Ytre Stavanger prosti (deanery) in the Diocese of Stavanger. The white, wooden church was built in a long church design in 1864 using designs by the architect Hans Linstow. The church seats about 300 people.

== Fire ==
The church was partially destroyed by arson on 1 August 1992, when two 17-year-old boys broke into the building and set fire to the altar. A cross from a grave pillar outside the church was placed upside down on the outside of the church wall in the days before the fire, which is believed to be connected with the Early Norwegian black metal scene.

The church was reopened on 5 April 1994.

== See also ==
- List of churches in Rogaland
