= Nedre Eggedal =

Village in Sigdal municipality, Norway

Coordinates: 60°10′00″N 9°25′00″E

Nedre Eggedal is a village in Sigdal municipality, Buskerud, Norway. The village is located on RV287 in the lower part of Eggedal valley, near the southern end of the Lake Solevatn and the Solevatn Nature Reserve (Solevatn naturreservat).
