= Fritz Røed =

Norwegian sculptor

- Born: 15 August 1928; Bryne, Norway
- Died: 20 December 2002 (aged 74); Tønsberg, Norway
- Occupation: Sculptor
- Notable work: Sverd i fjell

Fritz Røed (15 August 1928 – 20 December 2002) was a Norwegian sculptor. He is most associated with his work, Sverd i fjell, the commemorative monument that symbolizes the unification of the nation of Norway.

Sverd i fjell

== Biography ==
Røed was born in the community of Bryne in Time Municipality in Rogaland county, Norway. He studied at the Norwegian National Academy of Craft and Art Industry with Torbjørn Alvsåker 1946–48 and the Norwegian National Academy of Fine Arts under Per Palle Storm from 1948 to 1951 as well as under Einar Utzon-Frank at the Art Academy in Copenhagen in 1951 and Ossip Zadkine at the Académie de la Grande Chaumière in Paris 1952. Fritz Røed debut at the Autumn Exhibition 1956 with two children figurines. His work has a great variety of expressions.

The most widely recognized of his works is Sverd i fjell (Swords in Rock). The commemorative monument of the Battle of Hafrsfjord is noted for its simplicity. Three enormous bronze swords commemorate the battle during the year 872 when Harald Hårfagre united three districts into the nation of Norway. The crowns on the swords represent the different kings who took part in the battle. The monument was unveiled by King Olav V in 1983.

Vårfornemmelser, a sculpture by Fritz Røed, is located on the Fjellveien road in the Sandviken district of Bergen, Norway. Rieber & Son donated the sculpture to the city of Bergen in 1989 in connection with the 150-year anniversary of the firm.

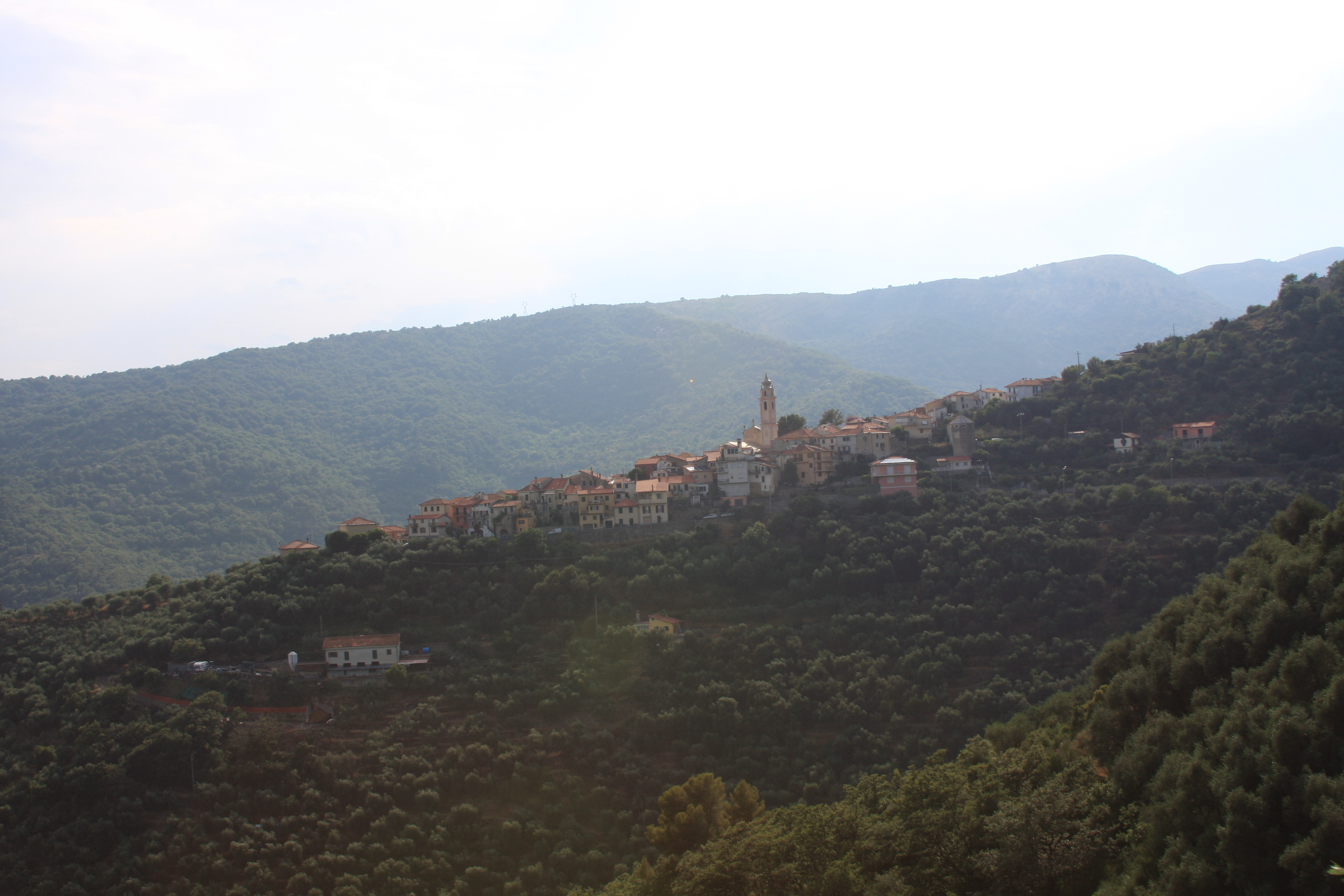
Villa Faraldi in Liguria (Italy) where Fritz Røed lived for many years

Røed was chairman of Artists' Association from 1981 to 1982 and chairman of the Association of Norwegian Sculptors 1984–1988. Røed had a studio in the small mountain town of Villa Faraldi in Liguria, Italy. The National Museum of Art, Architecture and Design owns three of his works.

In 2004, Fritz Røed Sculpture Park officially opened in the town of Bryne. The park consists of sculptures that are quite varied in style and size. Fritz Røed was involved in the planning and design of the park, and had even submitted plans for the sculpture park.
