= Madla =

Borough in Stavanger, Norway

Madla bydel Madla og Kvernevik bydel
- Borough
- Coat of arms

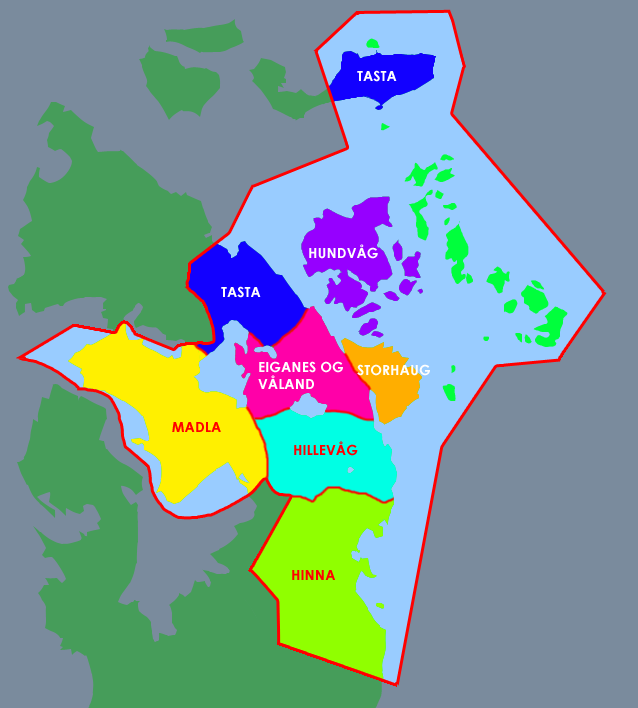
- Location within Stavanger municipality
- Coordinates: 58°57′N 05°39′E
- Country: Norway
- Region: Western Norway
- County: Rogaland
- District: Jæren
- City: Stavanger

Area
  - Total: 13.87 km^{2} (5.36 sq mi)
- Elevation: 12 m (39 ft)

Population (2025)
  - Total: 22,355
  - Density: 1,612/km^{2} (4,174/sq mi)
- Time zone: UTC+01:00 (CET)
  - Summer (DST): UTC+02:00 (CEST)
- Post Code: 4045 Hafrsfjord

Madla is a borough of the city of Stavanger which lies in the southwestern part of the large Stavanger Municipality in Rogaland county, Norway. It lies in the western part of the city, along the coast of the Hafrsfjorden. The 13.87-square-kilometre (3,430-acre) borough has a population (2025) of 22,355. The borough was added to the city of Stavanger in 1965 when the old Madla Municipality was merged into the city.

The borough of Madla have several historical landmarks. During the Viking Age (790-1066 AD), the Battle of Hafrsfjord was fought in the fjord of Hafrsfjord around the year of 872. The violent conflict became one of the most significant battles in the history of Norway as Harald Fairhair was declared the first king of Norway as a result of the conflict.

There are three churches in the borough: Revheim Church, Madlamark Church, and Sunde Church.

== Neighbourhoods ==
Although the borders of "neighbourhoods" (delområder) do not correspond exactly to the borough borders, Madla roughly consists of the following neighbourhoods: Madlamark, Hafrsfjord, Kvernevik, and Sunde.

== Politics ==
The borough is not independently self-governing, but it falls under the municipal council for Stavanger Municipality. The municipal council has delegated some responsibilities to the a borough council (Norwegian: bydelsutvalg) for Madla. The borough council consists of 11 members. The tables below show the current and historical composition of the borough council by political party.

Madla og Kvernevik bydelsutvalg 2023–2027
Party name (in Norwegian)	Number of representatives
Labour Party (Arbeiderpartiet)	3
Progress Party (Fremskrittspartiet)	1
Green Party (Miljøpartiet De Grønne)	1
Conservative Party (Høyre)	3
Pensioners' Party (Pensjonistpartiet)	1
Centre Party (Senterpartiet)	1
Liberal Party (Venstre)	1
Total number of members:	11

Madla og Kvernevik bydelsutvalg 2019–2023
Party name (in Norwegian)	Number of representatives
Labour Party (Arbeiderpartiet)	3
People's Action No to More Road Tolls (Folkeaksjonen nei til mer bompenger)	2
Progress Party (Fremskrittspartiet)	1
Conservative Party (Høyre)	3
Centre Party (Senterpartiet)	1
Liberal Party (Venstre)	1
Total number of members:	11

Madla bydelsutvalg 2015–2019
Party name (in Norwegian)	Number of representatives
Labour Party (Arbeiderpartiet)	2
Progress Party (Fremskrittspartiet)	1
Conservative Party (Høyre)	2
Christian Democratic Party (Kristelig Folkeparti)	1
Pensioners' Party (Pensjonistpartiet)	1
Centre Party (Senterpartiet)	1
Socialist Left Party (Sosialistisk Venstreparti)	1
Liberal Party (Venstre)	1
Local List(s) (Lokale lister)	1
Total number of members:	11
