= Battle of Hafrsfjord =

Middle ages battle fought in Hafrsfjord

Coordinates: 58°56′29″N 5°40′17″E

- Part of the Unification of Norway
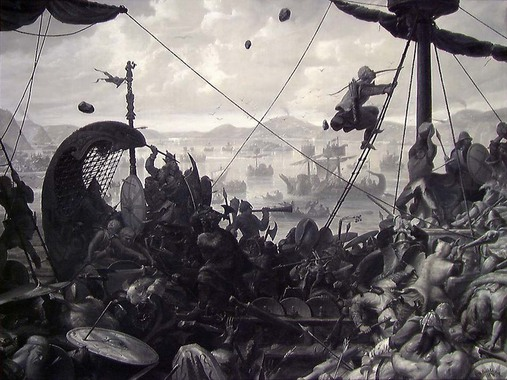
- Harald Hårfagre i slaget ved Hafrsfjord by Ole Peter Hansen Balling, 1870
Date	Between 872 and 900
Location	Hafrsfjord, Rogaland
Result	Vestfold victory
Territorial changes	Unification of the petty kingdoms of Norway

Belligerents
Kingdom of Vestfold	Kingdom of Hordaland; Kingdom of Agder

Commanders and leaders
Harald Fairhair	Eirik of Hordaland †; Kjotve the Rich

The Battle of Hafrsfjord (Norwegian: Slaget i Hafrsfjord) was a naval battle fought in Hafrsfjord sometime between 872 and 900 that resulted in the unification of Norway, later known as the Kingdom of Norway. After the battle, the victorious Viking chief Harald Fairhair proclaimed himself the first king of the Norwegians, merging several petty kingdoms under a single monarch for the first time.

== Significance ==
Although most scholars currently tend to regard the unification as a process lasting centuries, rather than being the result of a single battle, the Battle of Hafrsfjord ranks high in the popular imagination of Norway. It was the conclusion of King Harald I of Norway's declaration to become the sole ruler of Norway. This battle may well have been the largest in Norway up to that time and for a substantial time afterward.

It was formerly believed that this battle was the decisive event in the unification of Norway. According to Snorri's saga, King Harald controlled large parts of Norway's southeast portion before the battle; but other sources claim that the eastern portion of Norway was under the Danish king. The Battle of Hafrsfjord marks the final crushing of opposition from Norway's southwestern portion (primarily Rogaland, but also chieftains from the Sognefjord area). This made it possible for King Harald to subdue the country and collect taxes from a large part of it. Later historiography regarded him as the first legitimate King of Norway. Many of the defeated who would not submit to Harald's rule emigrated to Iceland (q.v.).

== Chronology ==
The exact year of the battle is unknown, but is generally considered to have taken place between 870 and 900. This uncertainty is due to lack of sources, and partly because the Christian calendar was not introduced at the time. The sagas follow the convention of counting the number of winters passed since an event.

A traditional date of the event, the year 872, is a 19th-century estimate. In the 1830s, the historian Rudolf Keyser counted the number of years backwards from the Battle of Svolder as recorded in Snorri Sturluson's Heimskringla, dating the battle to 872. Keyser's chronology was popularized by the works of the historian P. A. Munch, and by that time still unchallenged, this year was chosen for the millennial celebration of the unification of the Norwegian state in 1872.

In the 1920s, using similar methods as Keyser but highly critical to the reliability of the sagas, the historian Halvdan Koht dated the battle to about 900. For the next fifty years, this chronology was regarded by most scholars as being most likely. In the 1970s, the Icelandic historian Ólafia Einarsdóttir concluded that the battle took place somewhere between 870 and 875. However still disputed, most scholars will agree that the battle took place during the 880s.

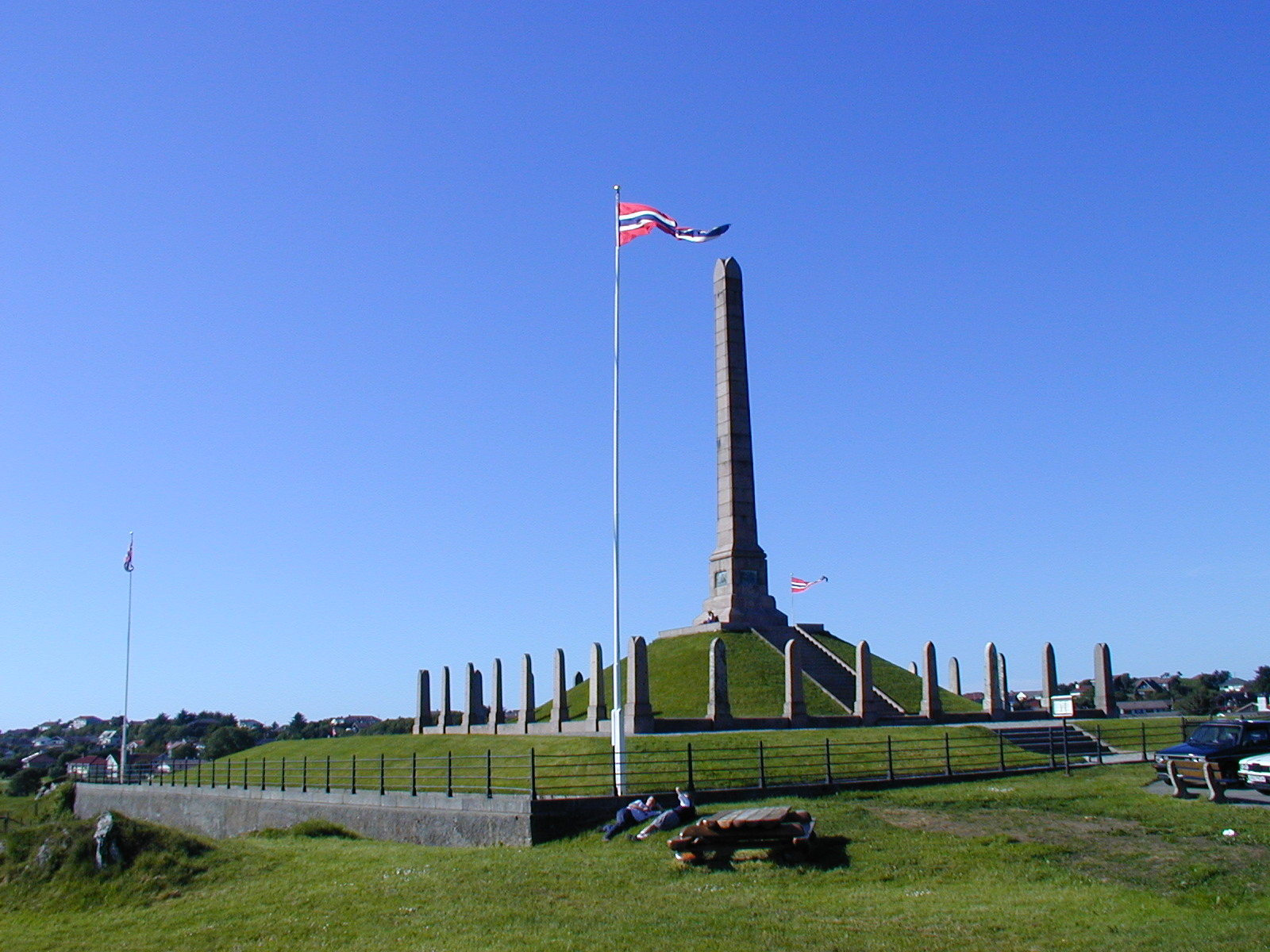
Haraldshaugen at Haugesund

== Memorials ==
The national monument of Haraldshaugen was raised in 1872 to commemorate the Battle of Hafrsfjord. In 1983, the monument and landmark The Swords in the Rock (Sverd i fjell) was designed by Fritz Røed and raised at Hafrsfjord in memory of the battle.

== Sources ==
The only contemporary source to this event is from Haraldskvæthi or Hrafnsmól (Lay of Harold), a ballad written by Þorbjörn Hornklofi, the court poet of King Harald Fairhair. The ballad is very simple, dramatic and illustrative.

Heyrði þú í Hafrsfirði,	Did you hear in Hafrsfjord
hvé hizug barðisk	how hard they fought
konungr enn kynstóri	the high born king
við Kjötva enn auðlagða;	against Kjotve the Rich.
knerrir kómu austan,	ships came from the east
kapps of lystir,	craving battle,
með gínöndum höfðum	with gaping heads
ok gröfnum tinglum.	and prows sculpted.

The most well-known source of the battle is Harald Fairhair's saga in Heimskringla written by Snorri Sturluson more than 300 years after the battle took place. Snorri gives a vivid and detailed description of the battle, although some historians continue to debate the historical accuracy of Snorri's work:

News came in from the south land that the people of Hordaland and Rogaland, Agder and Thelemark, were gathering, and bring together ships and weapons, and a great body of men. The leaders of this were Eirik king of Hordaland; Sulke king of Rogaland, and his brother Earl Sote: Kjotve the Rich, king of Agder, and his son Thor Haklang; and from Thelemark two brothers, Hroald Hryg and Had the Hard. Now when Harald got certain news of this, he assembled his forces, set his ships on the water, made himself ready with his men, and set out southwards along the coast, gathering many people from every district. King Eirik heard of this when he came south of Stad; and having assembled all the men he could expect, he proceeded southwards to meet the force which he knew was coming to his help from the east. The whole met together north of Jadar, and went into Hafersfjord, where King Harald was waiting with his forces. A great battle began, which was both hard and long; but at last King Harald gained the day. There King Eirik fell, and King Sulke, with his brother Earl Sote. Thor Haklang, who was a great berserk, had laid his ship against King Harald's, and there was above all measure a desperate attack, until Thor Haklang fell, and his whole ship was cleared of men. Then King Kjotve fled to a little isle outside, on which there was a good place of strength. Thereafter all his men fled, some to their ships, some up to the land; and the latter ran southwards over the country of Jadar.

== See also ==
- History of Norway
- Battle of Svolder
- Battle of Stiklestad

== Other sources ==
- Forte, Angelo with Richard Oram and Frederik Pedersen (2005) Viking Empires (Cambridge University Press) ISBN 978-0521829922
- Lincoln, Bruce (2014) Between History and Myth: Stories of Harald Fairhair and the Founding of the State (University of Chicago Press) ISBN 978-0226140926
