= Kvernevik =

Neighbourhood in the city of Stravanger, Norway

Coordinates: 58°57′51″N 5°36′02″E

Kvernevik is a neighborhood (delområde) in the city of Stavanger which lies in the southwestern part of the large municipality of Stavanger in Rogaland county, Norway. It is located in the borough of Madla, located at the mouth of the Hafrsfjorden.

The 1.46-square-kilometre (360-acre) neighborhood had a population in 2005 of 4,714 people. In Kvernevik, there are four kindergartens, a sports hall, and two schools (Kvernevik School and Smiodden School). There is also the Alexander Kielland monument, commemorating the victims of the Alexander L. Kielland accident in 1980. Near this monument, there are also rock carvings.
