= Hafrsfjord =

Fjord in Rogaland, Norway

- Hafrsfjorden
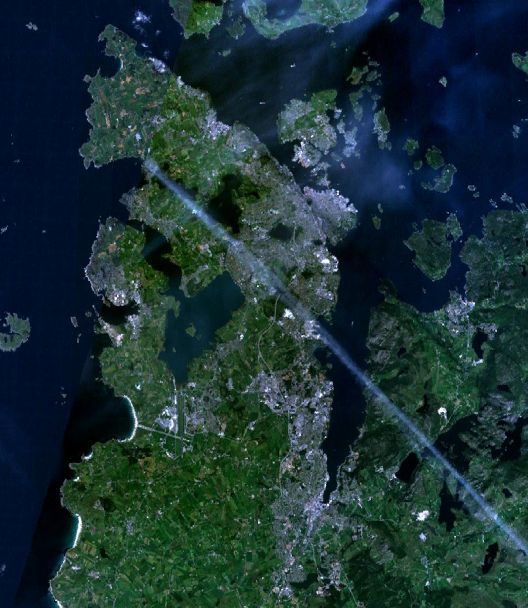
- Satellite image of North Jæren showing the hammer-shaped Hafrsfjord on the left
- Interactive map of the fjord
- Location: Rogaland county, Norway
- Coordinates: 58.92803°N 5.64855°E
- Type: Fjord
- Basin countries: Norway
- Max. length: 9 kilometres (5.6 mi)
- Settlements: Stavanger

Hafrsfjord is a fjord in the Stavanger Peninsula in Rogaland county, Norway. The 9-kilometre (5.6 mi) long fjord forms the border between Stavanger Municipality and Sola Municipality. On the west side of the fjord is the large village of Tananger, on the south is the village of Solakrossen, and on the east end of the fjord is the borough of Madla in the city of Stavanger. The Møllebukta bay area, located on the innermost part of the fjord, is the site of a popular beach and the Sverd i Fjell statues. The only bridge over the fjord is the Hafrsfjord Bridge which runs between Kvernevik in Stavanger Municipality and Jåsund in the village of Tananger in Sola Municipality.

Hafrsfjord is also the name of a neighbourhood (delområde) in the borough of Madla in the city of Stavanger. It has a population of 4,003, distributed on an area of 5.78 square kilometres (2.23 sq mi).

Hafrsfjord is also the location of the KNM Harald Hårfagre, the Basic Training Establishment for the Royal Norwegian Navy. The camp had been used for military purposes since 1871 and in 1934 it was renamed Madlaleiren. In 1952, Parliament decided that the Navy's boot camp would be added to the camp and also that the Navy would formally take over the camp. Three years later, the camp was named KNM Harald Hårfagre. Today KNM Harald Hårfagre is the principal training camp for both the Royal Navy and Royal Air Force. Officer Candidate School for the Navy moved the intake and basic education from Horten to KNM Harald Hårfagre during the summer of 2005.

== History ==
=== Battle of Hafrsfjord ===
Historically, the Hafrsfjorden was principally known for its association with the Battle of Hafrsfjord (Slaget i Hafrsfjord). King Harald "Fairhair", the first king of Norway, won a great naval battle during the year 872 which resulted in the unification of Norway into one kingdom. The battle paved the way for Harald to gain control over most of western coast of Norway and rightly call himself king of the country.

In 1983, a monument by Norwegian sculptor and artist Fritz Røed was raised in Møllebukta at the northeasternmost end of the Hafrsfjorden. The monument is called Sverd i Fjell (lit. 'Swords in Rock') and represents the Battle of Hafrsfjord. The crowns on the top of the swords represent the three districts that participated in the battle.

=== Name ===
The modern form of the name should be Haffjorden, but because of its historical significance the Old Norse form of the name has been revived. The first element is the genitive case of hafr which means 'male goat' and fjord means 'fjord'. Hafr might have been the name of a skerry at the narrow entrance of the fjord.
