= Sund Municipality =

Former municipality in Hordaland, Norway

Sund Municipality Sund kommune
- Former municipality
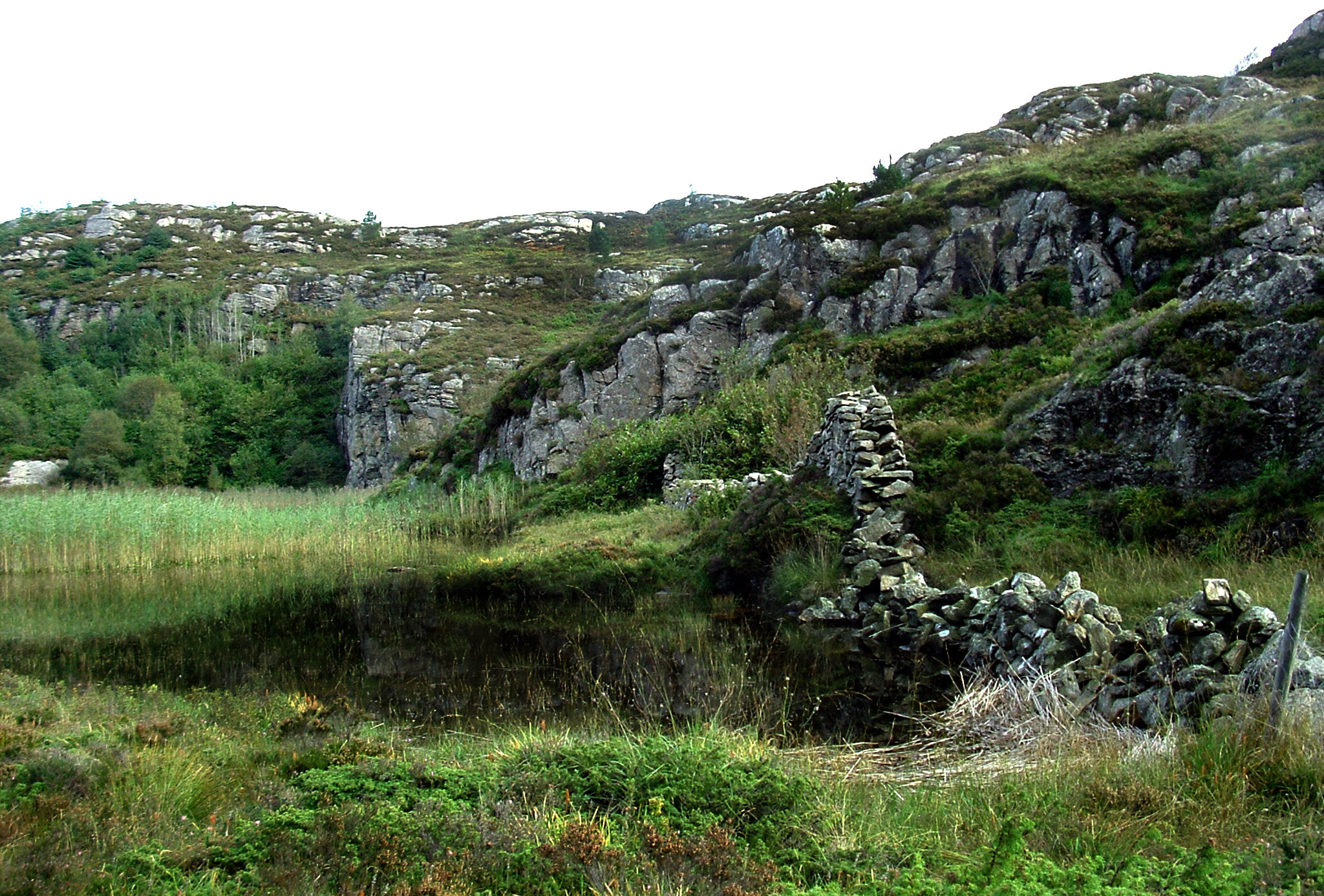
- View of an old stone fence on the island of Sotra

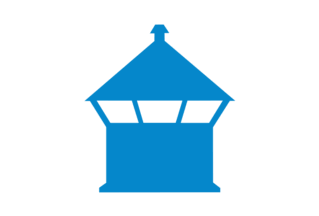
- Flag Coat of arms

- Hordaland within Norway

- Sund within Hordaland
- Coordinates: 60°13′56″N 05°06′17″E
- Country: Norway
- County: Hordaland
- District: Midhordland
- Established: 1 Jan 1838
  - Created as: Formannskapsdistrikt
- Disestablished: 1 Jan 2020
  - Succeeded by: Øygarden Municipality
- Administrative centre: Skogsvåg

Government
  - Mayor (2013–2019): Kari-Anne Landro (H)

Area (upon dissolution)
  - Total: 99.54 km^{2} (38.43 sq mi)
  - Land: 94.7 km^{2} (36.6 sq mi)
  - Water: 4.84 km^{2} (1.87 sq mi) 4.9%
  - Rank: #381 in Norway
- Highest elevation: 284.6 m (934 ft)

Population (2019)
  - Total: 7,062
  - Rank: #149 in Norway
  - Density: 70.9/km^{2} (184/sq mi)
  - Change (10 years): ▲ +19.7%
- Demonym: Sundsokning

Official language
  - Norwegian form: Nynorsk
- Time zone: UTC+01:00 (CET)
  - Summer (DST): UTC+02:00 (CEST)
- ISO 3166 code: NO-1245

Sund is a former municipality in the old Hordaland county, Norway. The 99.54-square-kilometre (38.43 sq mi) municipality existed from 1838 until its dissolution in 2020. The area is now part of Øygarden Municipality in the traditional district of Midhordland in Vestland county. The administrative centre was the village of Skogsvågen on the island of Sotra. Other villages in the municipality included Klokkarvik, Telavåg, Kausland, and Hammarsland

Sund Municipality covered the southern third of the island of Sotra, west of the city of Bergen. It also included many smaller, surrounding islands. Sund Municipality was a predominantly rural municipality, with no major settlements, the largest being Hammarsland with approximately 900 inhabitants (in 2013). Due to the proximity to the city of Bergen, a large proportion of the population commuted to the city to work.

Prior to its dissolution in 2020, the 99.54-square-kilometre (38.43 sq mi) municipality was the 381st largest by area out of the 422 municipalities in Norway. Sund Municipality was the 149th most populous municipality in Norway with a population of about 7,062. The municipality's population density was 70.9 inhabitants per square kilometre (184/sq mi) and its population had increased by 19.7% over the previous 10-year period.

== General information ==
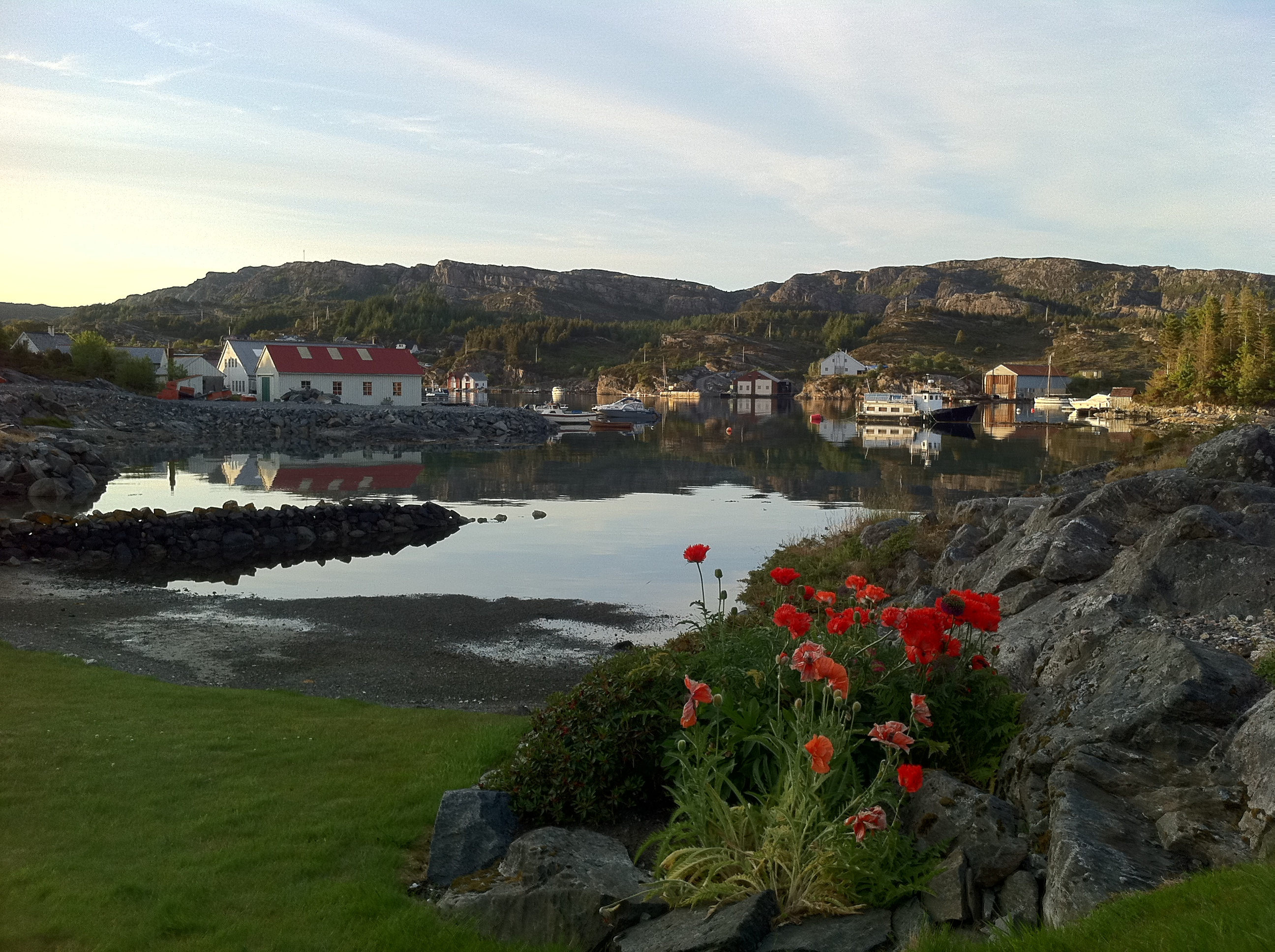
View of Forlandsvåg

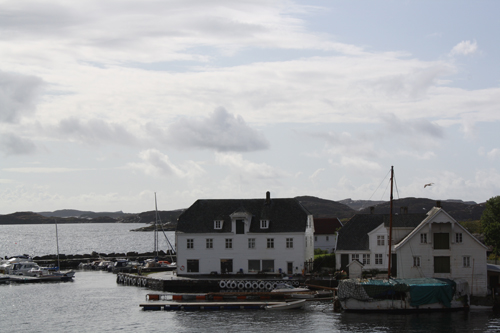
Historic businesses in Glesvær harbor

The parish of Sund was established as a formannskapsdistrikt (municipality) on 1 January 1838. It originally included many islands to the southwest of the Bergen Peninsula. On 1 January 1886, Sund Municipality was divided: the southern archipelago (population: 2,396) became the new Austevoll Municipality and the rest of the municipality (population: 2,112) remained as a smaller Sund Municipality.

On 1 January 2020, there was a large municipal merger including three neighboring municipalities. Fjell Municipality, Sund Municipality, and Øygarden Municipality were merged into a new, much larger Øygarden Municipality. Historically, this municipality was part of the old Hordaland county. On 1 January 2020, Hordaland county became a part of the newly-formed Vestland county (after Hordaland and Sogn og Fjordane counties were merged).

=== Name ===
The municipality (originally the parish) is named after the old Sund farm (Old Norse: Sund) since the first Sund Church was built there. The name is identical to the word sund which means "strait", "sound", or "channel".

=== Coat of arms ===
The original coat of arms was granted on 26 April 1966 and they were in use until the new arms were approved on 23 March 1988. The blazon is "Azure, two piles in the point argent issuing from each side of the chief and a lighthouse on an island sable over three bars wavy argent". This means the arms have a blue field (background) and the charge is a black lighthouse on an island over three wavy lines. There are also two triangle-shapes emitting from the lighthouse. The triangles and wavy lines have a tincture of argent which means they are commonly colored white, but if the arms are made out of metal, then silver is used. The arms were designed to look like a lighthouse on an island in the ocean, emitting light to guide travelers.

A new coat of arms was granted on 23 March 1988 and they were in use until 1 January 2020 when the municipality was dissolved (its successor, Øygarden Municipality, adopted these arms starting on that same day). The official blazon is "Argent, a lighthouse couped azure" (Norwegian: På sølv grunn ei blå fyrlykt). The arms were designed to replace the old "unofficial" arms (since they did not meet the legal requirements for arms). They were designed to be similar to the old arms while meeting the state requirements. The arms have a field (background) has a tincture of argent which means it is commonly colored white, but if it is made out of metal, then silver is used. The charge is the top of a lighthouse. This design was chosen to symbolize the importance of the sea and the alertness of the local population. The arms were designed by Even Jarl Skoglund. The municipal flag has the same design as the coat of arms.

Arms from 1966 to 1988

Arms from 1988 to 2019 (these arms have also been used by Øygarden Municipality since 2020).

=== Churches ===
The Church of Norway had one parish (sokn) within Sund Municipality. It is part of the Vesthordland prosti (deanery) in the Diocese of Bjørgvin.

Churches in Sund Municipality
Parish (sokn)	Church name	Location of the church	Year built
Sund	Sund Church	Klokkarvik	1997
Sund	Kausland Church	Kausland	1881

== Transport ==
The Sotra Bridge, opened in 1971, drastically improved travel to and from Sund and it spurred rapid population growth after ages of stagnancy. Due to the rapidly increasing traffic across the bridge and on the highways of Sotra, the Norwegian Public Roads Administration developed plans in the 2000s for a new bridge and highway between Bergen and Sotra. The plans include a new dual carriageway bridge to replace the Sotra Bridge, and new highways that lead northwards to Øygarden Municipality and southwards to Sund.

== History ==
On 26 April 1942, after having discovered that two men from the Linge company were being hidden in Telavåg, the Gestapo arrived to arrest the Norwegian officers. Shots were exchanged, and two prominent German Gestapo officers, Johannes Behrens and Henry Bertram, and the Norwegian Arne Værum, were shot dead. Reichskommissar Josef Terboven ordered the Gestapo to retaliate, burning all buildings in the village, executing or sending the men to the Sachsenhausen concentration camp, and imprisoning the women and children for two years. In addition, 18 Norwegian prisoners at a Norwegian internment camp were killed as a reprisal. The event has since become known as the "Telavåg tragedy", and is sometimes compared to similar World War II atrocities, such as the Lidice massacre, with higher death tolls.

== Population ==
Historical population

Year	Pop.	±% p.a.
1855	3,876	—
1865	4,211	+0.83%
1875	4,508	+0.68%
1891	2,221	−4.33%
1900	2,374	+0.74%
1910	2,471	+0.40%

Year	Pop.	±% p.a.
1920	2,731	+1.01%
1930	2,797	+0.24%
1946	2,912	+0.25%
1951	2,998	+0.58%
1960	3,092	+0.34%
1970	3,110	+0.06%

Year	Pop.	±% p.a.
1980	3,900	+2.29%
1990	4,976	+2.47%
2000	5,160	+0.36%
2010	5,995	+1.51%
2019	7,062	+1.84%

Note: The municipal borders were changed in 1886, causing a significant change in the population.
Source: Statistics Norway and Norwegian Historical Data Centre

Population development, 1951–2008
Source: Statistics Norway

== Geography ==
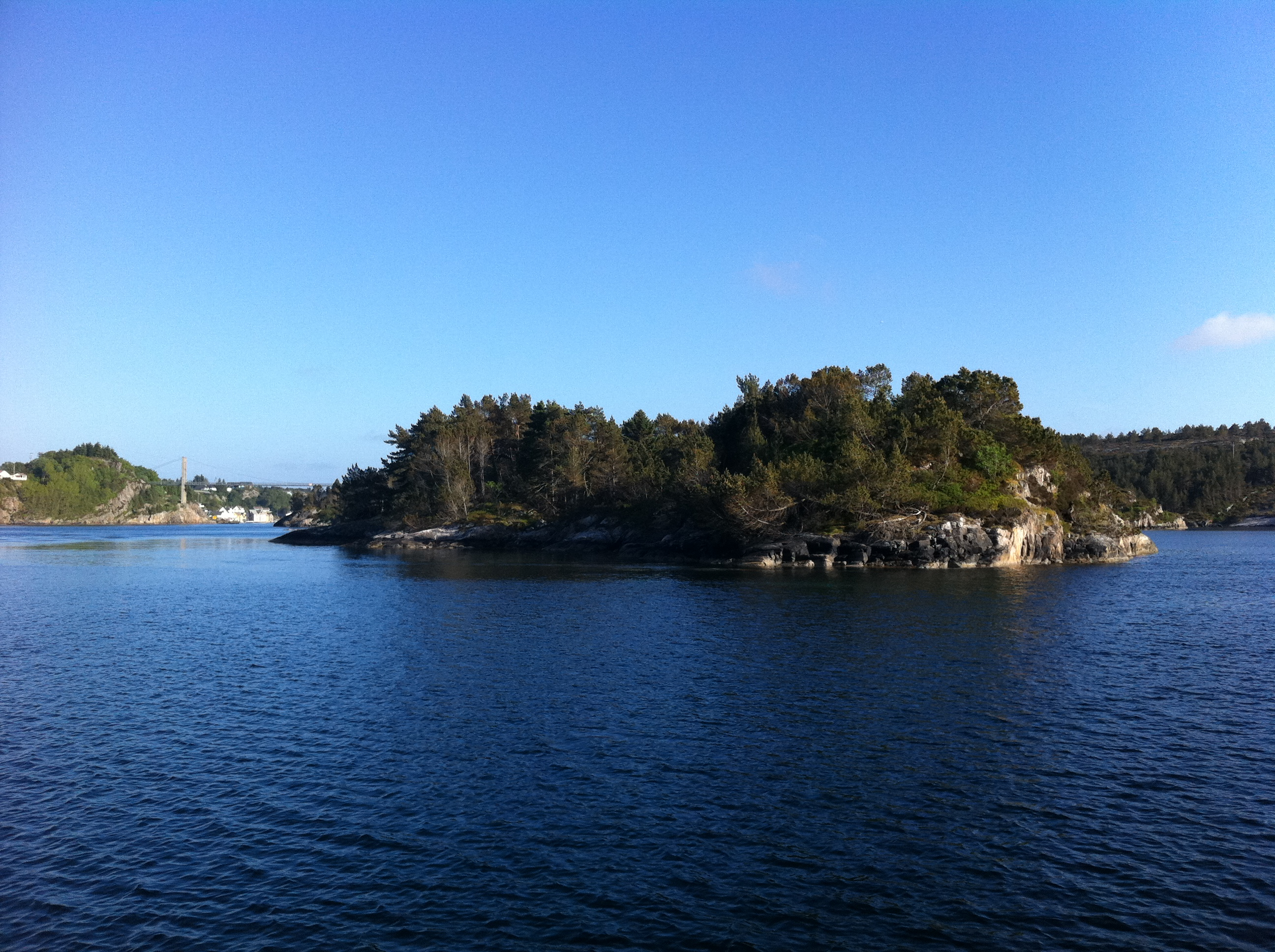
View of Nordspissen on Toftøya

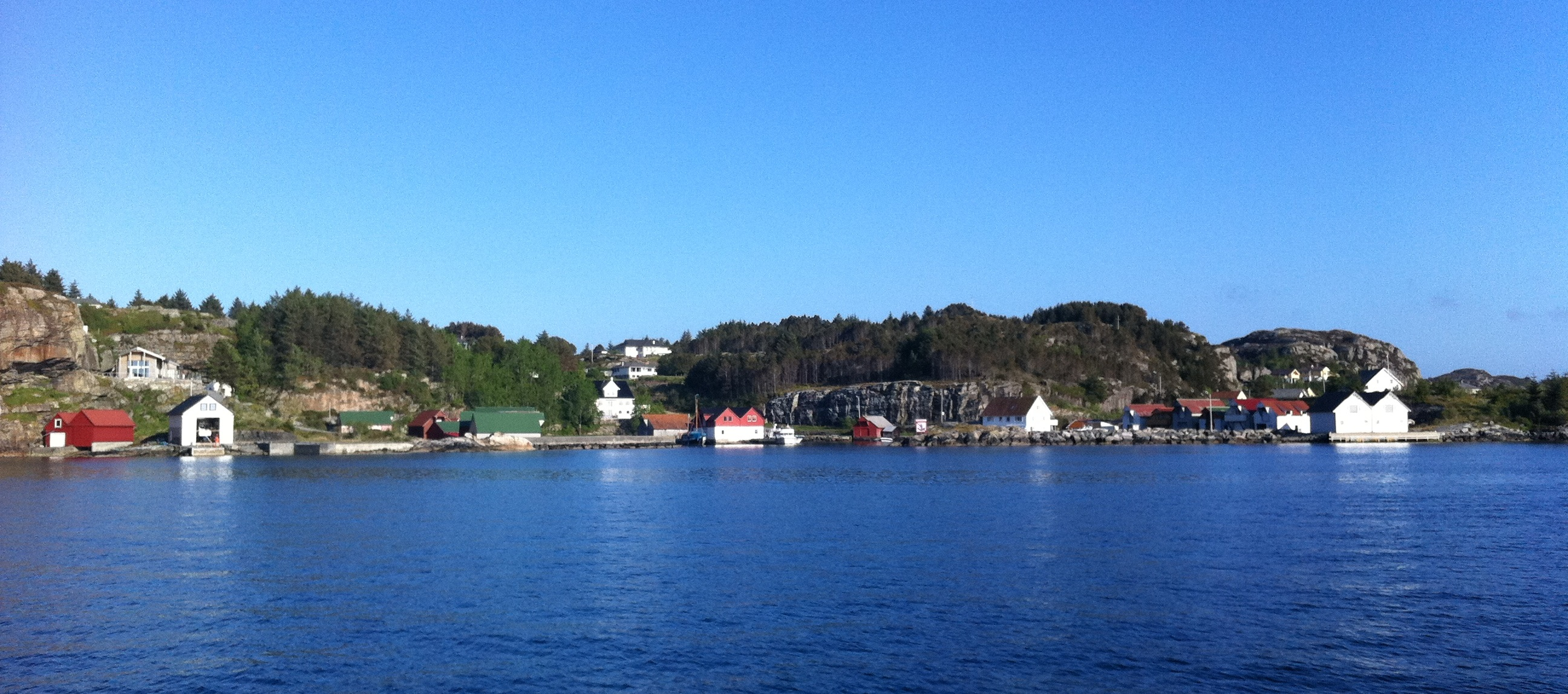
View of Toftevika

Sund Municipality included the southern third of the island of Sotra, as well as the many islands that surround it. The largest of the smaller islands are Toftarøyna, Lerøyna, Bjelkarøyna, Tyssøyna, Stora Risøyna, Stora Vardøyna, Golta, and Vikso. In total, the municipality encompassed 466 islands and skerries, which gave it a total coastline of about 110 kilometres (68 mi).

The highest peak in Sund was the 284.6-metre (934 ft) tall Førdesveten (or simply Veten).

The fjord separating the island of Sotra from the mainland, Krossfjorden, was historically the most used sea route into the city of Bergen, and is as much as 600 metres (2,000 ft) deep in some places. The treacherous waters in the area mean there has been a continuous need for piloting services, and this tradition is kept alive by the "Viksøy Losstasjon".

=== Climate ===
On an average, the island of Sotra experiences 1,328 millimetres (52.3 in) of rainfall annually, less than the 2,250 millimetres (89 in) that the nearby city of Bergen receives. The year-round average temperature is 7.6 °C (45.7 °F), with the coldest month being February, when the average temperature reaches 2.1 °C (35.8 °F). The warmest month is August, with an average temperature of 12.8 °C (55.0 °F).

=== Settlements ===
There were six urban settlements, as defined by Statistics Norway, within the border of the municipality. The largest is Hammarsland in northern Sund, with 929 inhabitants as of 2019. The others are Telavåg, Skogsvågen, Klokkarvik, Forland, and Glesnes.

== Government ==
While it existed, Sund Municipality was responsible for primary education (through 10th grade), outpatient health services, senior citizen services, welfare and other social services, zoning, economic development, and municipal roads and utilities. The municipality was governed by a municipal council of directly elected representatives. The mayor was indirectly elected by a vote of the municipal council. The municipality was under the jurisdiction of the Bergen District Court and the Gulating Court of Appeal.

=== Municipal council ===
The municipal council (Kommunestyre) of Sund Municipality was made up of 21 representatives that were elected to four year terms. The tables below show the historical composition of the council by political party.

Sund kommunestyre 2015–2019
Party name (in Nynorsk)	Number of representatives
Labour Party (Arbeidarpartiet)	6
Progress Party (Framstegspartiet)	3
Conservative Party (Høgre)	7
Christian Democratic Party (Kristeleg Folkeparti)	1
Centre Party (Senterpartiet)	2
Socialist Left Party (Sosialistisk Venstreparti)	1
Liberal Party (Venstre)	1
Total number of members:	21
Note: On 1 January 2020, Sund Municipality, Fjell Municipality, and Øygarden Municipality were merged to form the new Øygarden Municipality.

Sund kommunestyre 2011–2015
Party name (in Nynorsk)	Number of representatives
Labour Party (Arbeidarpartiet)	5
Progress Party (Framstegspartiet)	4
Conservative Party (Høgre)	11
Christian Democratic Party (Kristeleg Folkeparti)	1
Centre Party (Senterpartiet)	2
Socialist Left Party (Sosialistisk Venstreparti)	1
Liberal Party (Venstre)	1
Total number of members:	25

Sund kommunestyre 2007–2011
Party name (in Nynorsk)	Number of representatives
Labour Party (Arbeidarpartiet)	5
Progress Party (Framstegspartiet)	5
Conservative Party (Høgre)	10
Christian Democratic Party (Kristeleg Folkeparti)	1
Centre Party (Senterpartiet)	3
Liberal Party (Venstre)	1
Total number of members:	25

Sund kommunestyre 2003–2007
Party name (in Nynorsk)	Number of representatives
Labour Party (Arbeidarpartiet)	6
Progress Party (Framstegspartiet)	5
Conservative Party (Høgre)	9
Christian Democratic Party (Kristeleg Folkeparti)	1
Centre Party (Senterpartiet)	2
Socialist Left Party (Sosialistisk Venstreparti)	2
Total number of members:	25

Sund kommunestyre 1999–2003
Party name (in Nynorsk)	Number of representatives
Labour Party (Arbeidarpartiet)	7
Progress Party (Framstegspartiet)	6
Conservative Party (Høgre)	8
Christian Democratic Party (Kristeleg Folkeparti)	1
Centre Party (Senterpartiet)	2
Liberal Party (Venstre)	1
Total number of members:	25

Sund kommunestyre 1995–1999
Party name (in Nynorsk)	Number of representatives
Labour Party (Arbeidarpartiet)	8
Progress Party (Framstegspartiet)	4
Conservative Party (Høgre)	6
Christian Democratic Party (Kristeleg Folkeparti)	1
Centre Party (Senterpartiet)	5
Liberal Party (Venstre)	1
Total number of members:	25

Sund kommunestyre 1991–1995
Party name (in Nynorsk)	Number of representatives
Labour Party (Arbeidarpartiet)	10
Progress Party (Framstegspartiet)	2
Conservative Party (Høgre)	8
Christian Democratic Party (Kristeleg Folkeparti)	2
Centre Party (Senterpartiet)	1
Liberal Party (Venstre)	2
Total number of members:	25

Sund kommunestyre 1987–1991
Party name (in Nynorsk)	Number of representatives
Labour Party (Arbeidarpartiet)	11
Progress Party (Framstegspartiet)	3
Conservative Party (Høgre)	7
Christian Democratic Party (Kristeleg Folkeparti)	2
Liberal Party (Venstre)	2
Total number of members:	25

Sund kommunestyre 1983–1987
Party name (in Nynorsk)	Number of representatives
Labour Party (Arbeidarpartiet)	7
Progress Party (Framstegspartiet)	2
Conservative Party (Høgre)	7
Christian Democratic Party (Kristeleg Folkeparti)	1
Liberal Party (Venstre)	1
Cross-party list for the Glesvær, Tælavåg, Skogsvåg, and Pollen areas (Tverrpolitisk liste for Glesvær, Tælavåg, Skogsvåg og Pollen krinsar)	7
Total number of members:	25

Sund kommunestyre 1979–1983
Party name (in Nynorsk)	Number of representatives
Labour Party (Arbeidarpartiet)	3
Conservative Party (Høgre)	4
Christian Democratic Party (Kristeleg Folkeparti)	2
Centre Party (Senterpartiet)	1
Liberal Party (Venstre)	1
Tofterøy and Stranda local list (Tofterøy og Stranda Krinsliste)	4
Sund school district list (Sund skulekrins liste)	2
Cross-party list for Glesnes, Pollen, and Telavåg (Tverrpolitisk liste for Glesnes, Pollen og Telavåg)	8
Total number of members:	25

Sund kommunestyre 1975–1979
Party name (in Nynorsk)	Number of representatives
Labour Party (Arbeidarpartiet)	5
Conservative Party (Høgre)	7
Christian Democratic Party (Kristeleg Folkeparti)	3
New People's Party (Nye Folkepartiet)	1
Centre Party (Senterpartiet)	1
Liberal Party (Venstre)	1
Pollen local list (Pollen Krinsliste)	2
Sund School local list (Sund Skulekrins liste)	2
Tofterøy local list (Tofterøy Krinsliste)	1
Tælavåg local list (Tælavåg Krinsliste)	2
Total number of members:	25

Sund kommunestyre 1971–1975
Party name (in Nynorsk)	Number of representatives
Labour Party (Arbeidarpartiet)	7
Conservative Party (Høgre)	4
Christian Democratic Party (Kristeleg Folkeparti)	2
Centre Party (Senterpartiet)	2
Liberal Party (Venstre)	5
Local List(s) (Lokale lister)	5
Total number of members:	25

Sund kommunestyre 1967–1971
Party name (in Nynorsk)	Number of representatives
Labour Party (Arbeidarpartiet)	3
Conservative Party (Høgre)	2
Christian Democratic Party (Kristeleg Folkeparti)	2
Liberal Party (Venstre)	2
Local List(s) (Lokale lister)	8
Total number of members:	27

Sund kommunestyre 1963–1967
Party name (in Nynorsk)	Number of representatives
Local List(s) (Lokale lister)	17
Total number of members:	17

Sund heradsstyre 1959–1963
Party name (in Nynorsk)	Number of representatives
Local List(s) (Lokale lister)	17
Total number of members:	17

Sund heradsstyre 1955–1959
Party name (in Nynorsk)	Number of representatives
Local List(s) (Lokale lister)	17
Total number of members:	17

Sund heradsstyre 1951–1955
Party name (in Nynorsk)	Number of representatives
Local List(s) (Lokale lister)	16
Total number of members:	16

Sund heradsstyre 1947–1951
Party name (in Nynorsk)	Number of representatives
Local List(s) (Lokale lister)	16
Total number of members:	16

Sund heradsstyre 1945–1947
Party name (in Nynorsk)	Number of representatives
Christian Democratic Party (Kristeleg Folkeparti)	2
List of workers, fishermen, and small farmholders (Arbeidarar, fiskarar, småbrukarar liste)	2
Local List(s) (Lokale lister)	12
Total number of members:	16

Sund heradsstyre 1937–1941*
Party name (in Nynorsk)	Number of representatives
List of workers, fishermen, and small farmholders (Arbeidarar, fiskarar, småbrukarar liste)	2
Local List(s) (Lokale lister)	7
Women's list (Kvinnelisten)	7
Total number of members:	16
Note: Due to the German occupation of Norway during World War II, no elections were held for new municipal councils until after the war ended in 1945.

=== Mayors ===
The mayor (Nynorsk: ordførar) of Sund Municipality was the political leader of the municipality and the chairperson of the municipal council. The following people held this position:

- 1838–1855: Johan Fritzner Greve
- 1856–1859: Niels Telnæs
- 1860–1861: Knud C. Børnes
- 1862–1863: Johan Greve
- 1864–1867: Gerhard Christian Meidell
- 1868–1871: Ole Ingebrigtsen Søreide
- 1872–1873: Mons Nilsen Vorland
- 1874–1875: Gerhard Christian Meidell
- 1876–1877: Ole Ingebrigtsen Søreide
- 1878–1891: Lars R. Lerøen (FV)
- 1892–1898: Mons Nilsen Vorland
- 1899–1916: Ole S. Kallestad
- 1917–1919: Thomas T. Midttveit
- 1920–1925: Arne Bakke (H)
- 1926–1928: Thomas T. Midttveit
- 1929–1931: Arne Bakke (H)
- 1932–1942: Ole N. Høiland
- 1942–1945: Mikal Lerøy (NS)
- 1945–1945: Ole N. Høiland
- 1946–1951: Johannes Evensen Hummelsund (KrF)
- 1952–1971: Sigurd Grimstad (LL)
- 1971–1975: Olav Ullebust (Ap)
- 1975–1979: Even Johannes Evensen (H)
- 1979–1991: Arne Olav Nilsen (Ap)
- 1991–1995: Harald Aasen (Ap)
- 1995–2010: Albrigt Sangolt (H)
- 2010–2013: Ove Bernt Trellevik (H)
- 2013–2019: Kari-Anne Landro (H)

== See also ==
- List of former municipalities of Norway
