= Tromsø (disambiguation) =

Tromsø may refer to:

== Places ==
- Tromsø, a city within Tromsø Municipality in Troms county, Norway
- Tromsø Municipality, a municipality in Troms county, Norway
- Tromsø Airport, an airport in Tromsø Municipality in Troms county, Norway
- University of Tromsø, a university based in the city of Tromsø in Tromsø Municipality in Troms county, Norway
- Tromsø Region, a region in Troms county, Norway
- Tromsø Bridge, a road bridge in the city of Tromsø in Tromsø Municipality in Troms county, Norway
- Tromsø Estate, a historic estate based in Troms county, Norway

== Religion ==
- Tromsø Cathedral, the seat of the Diocese of Nord-Hålogaland in the city of Tromsø in Tromsø Municipality in Troms county, Norway
- Tromsø domprosti, a Church of Norway arch-deanery within the Diocese of Nord-Hålogaland

== Sports ==
- Tromsø IL, a sports club in Tromsø Municipality in Troms county, Norway
- Tromsø Storm, a Norwegian basketball team based in the city of Tromsø in Tromsø Municipality in Troms county, Norway
- Tromsø Hockey, an ice hockey team based in the city of Tromsø in Tromsø Municipality in Troms county, Norway
- Tromsø Trailblazers, a former American football club based in the city of Tromsø in Tromsø Municipality in Troms county, Norway
- Tromsø SkyRace, an international skyrunning competition held from 2014 until 2023

== Other ==
- NoCGV Tromsø, a patrol vessel for the Norwegian Coast Guard
- Tromsø Sparebank, a former savings bank based in Tromsø, Norway
- Tromsø Burial, a burial site where many Viking-era items have been discovered
- Tromsø Palm, a species of hogweed, a perennial herbaceous plant in the carrot family Apiaceae
- Tromsø University Museum, a museum that is the oldest scientific institution in Northern Norway
- Tromsø International Film Festival, an annual film festival held during the third week of January in the city of Tromsø, Norway
- Tromsø Satellite Station, a satellite earth station located in Tromsø Municipality in Troms county, Norway
