= Metropolitan regions of Norway =

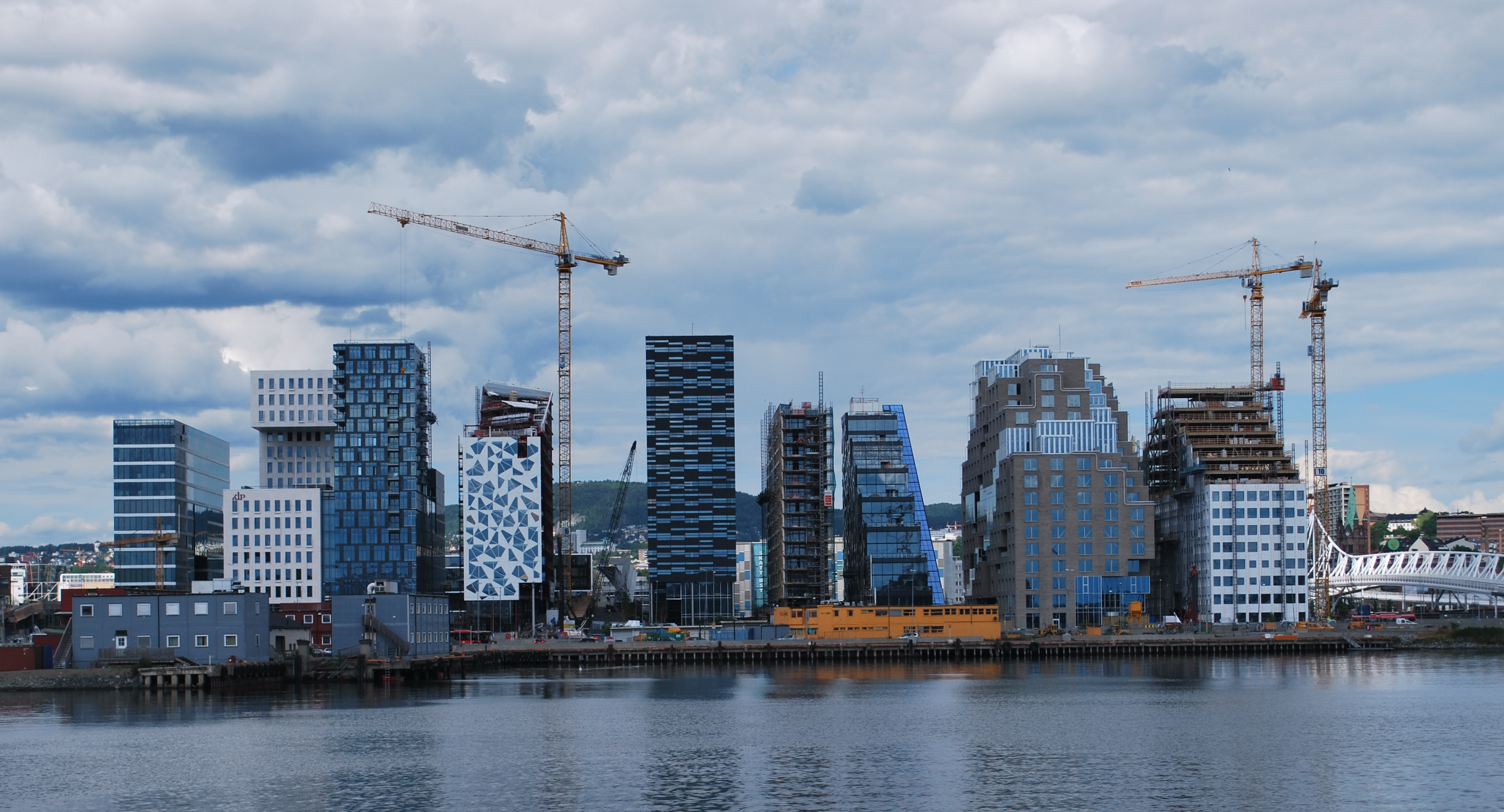
Oslo skyline

There are 16 statistical metropolitan areas in Norway, of which six count as "Greater City Regions" (Storbyregioner) and ten as "City Regions" (Byregioner). The classification comes from Storbymeldingen (The Greater City Report) from the Norwegian Ministry of Local Government and Regional Development. This report was composed in 2002–2003 to create a coherent policy for the development of metropolitan areas within Norwegian society. It was presented by then Minister of Local Government and Regional Development, Erna Solberg on 12 March 2003. The Greater City Regions contain cities with numbers of inhabitants ranging from around 60,000 to 1.4 million, while the City Regions range from around 45 to 175 thousand. This is out of a national population of around 5.2 million citizens.

The three most populous regions are the Greater Oslo Region, the Greater Bergen Region, and the Greater Stavanger Region.

== Greater City Regions ==
Six Norwegian cities are considered Greater Cities (Storbyer). This classification is the result of an overall evaluation of these cities' population and their importance as regional centres. The six cities are Oslo, Bergen, Trondheim, Stavanger, Kristiansand and Tromsø. According to Storbymeldingen, these regions contained the following number of municipalities and inhabitants as of 1 July 2009 (the right-hand column shows the number of inhabitants in the main city, within the boundaries of its municipality):

Greater City Region	Municipalities	Inhabitants in region 2010	Inhabitants in region 2030	Inhabitants in municipality 2010
Greater Oslo Region	46	1,422,443	1,835,191	590 041
Greater Bergen Region	14	412,156	478,926	275,112
Greater Stavanger Region	13	321,412	403,907	122,602
Trondheim Region	11	261,759	301,966	169,343
Kristiansand Region	10	155,648	185,051	80,748
Tromsø Region	2	75,570	83,869	70,818

== City Regions ==
In addition to these six regions, there are ten lesser regions referred to as City Regions (Byregioner). The City Regions of Drammen and Moss are for many purposes considered part of the Greater Oslo Region, bringing the number down to eight. The City Regions, according to the same report, are the following (these regions do not all contain one, main city, so here this category is not included):

City Region	Municipalities	Inhabitants in 2009	Inhabitants in 2030
Mjøsa Cities	10	180,161	201,829
Drammen Region	8	151,769	190,055
Lower Glomma Region	4	143,992	173,620
Haugesund Region	10	128,797	156,830
Tønsberg Region	7	114,868	140,742
Grenland	5	123,075	159,312
Larvik/Sandefjord Region	3	87,531	100,897
Ålesund Region	9	82,165	97,604
Moss Region	4	55,290	66,887
Bodø Region	3	48,878	60,557

== See also ==
- Counties of Norway
- List of municipalities of Norway
- List of towns and cities in Norway
- Regions of Norway
