= Signaturen =

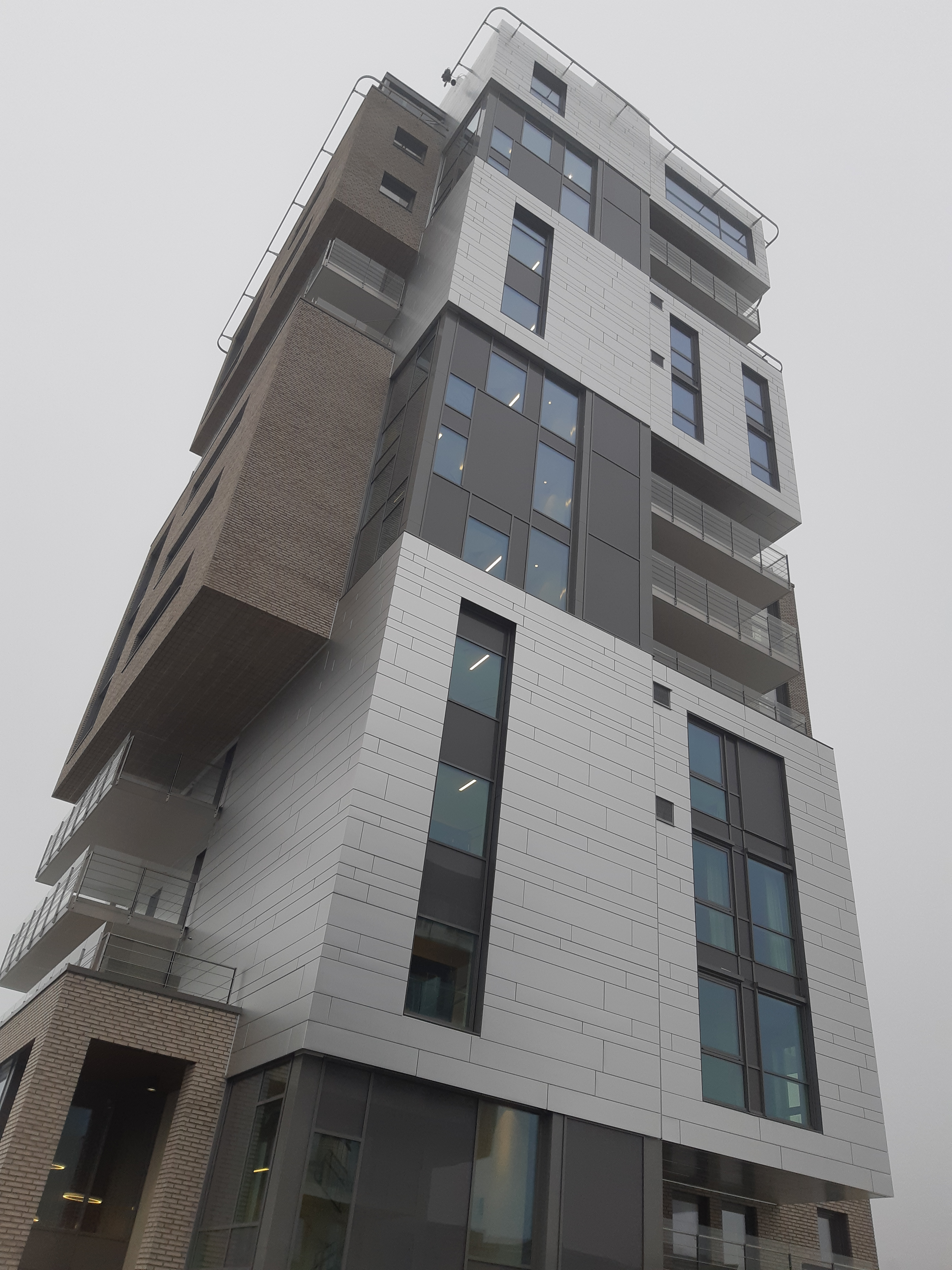
- Signaturen

General information
- Type: Residential
- Architectural style: Neo-futurism
- Location: Tønsberg, Norway
- Coordinates: 59°15′59.33″N 10°24′01.13″E
- Construction started: 2017
- Completed: Early 2019
- Opened: December 2018
- Owner: Selvaag Bolig

Height
- Roof: 43 m (141 ft)

Technical details
- Floor count: 13 (including an underground parking area)
- Lifts/elevators: 1

Website
- www.selvaagbolig.no/vestfold/kaldnes-brygge/signaturen

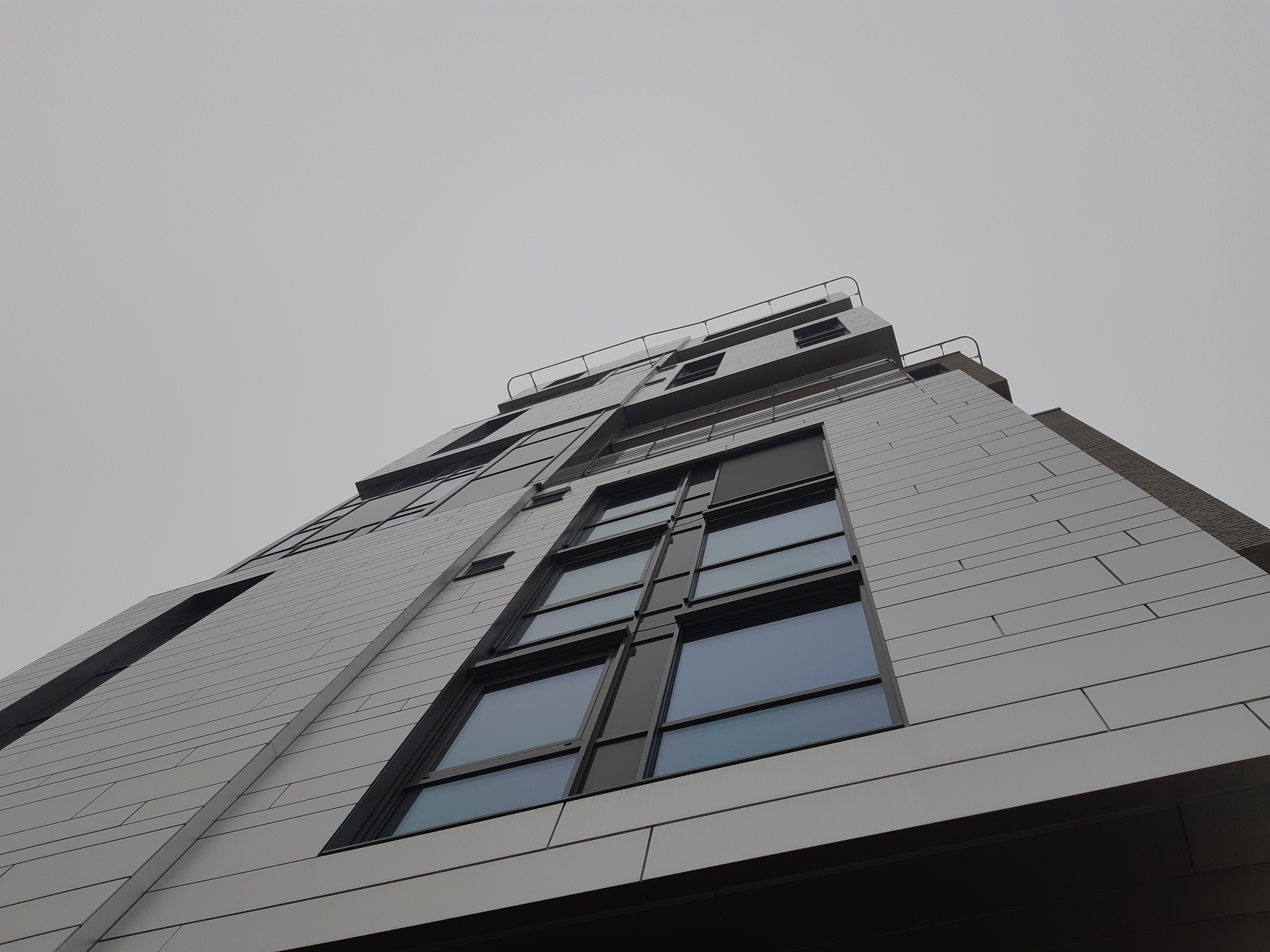
Looking up at the Signaturen

Signaturen is a residential high-rise building in the city of Tønsberg in Norway. The building is situated in Kaldnes on the northernmost part of the island Nøtterøy which lies in Tønsberg Municipality. At 43 metres (141 ft) tall, it is Vestfold county's tallest building.

The building is owned by the Norwegian residential property developer Selvaag Bolig and completed in early 2019, but was opened for new residents already in December 2018. The construction started in 2017.

The residential building has 13 floors and 23 apartments. The top floor can be reached by either stairs or a high-speed Kone traction elevator. The tower has a neo-futuristic architectural style.

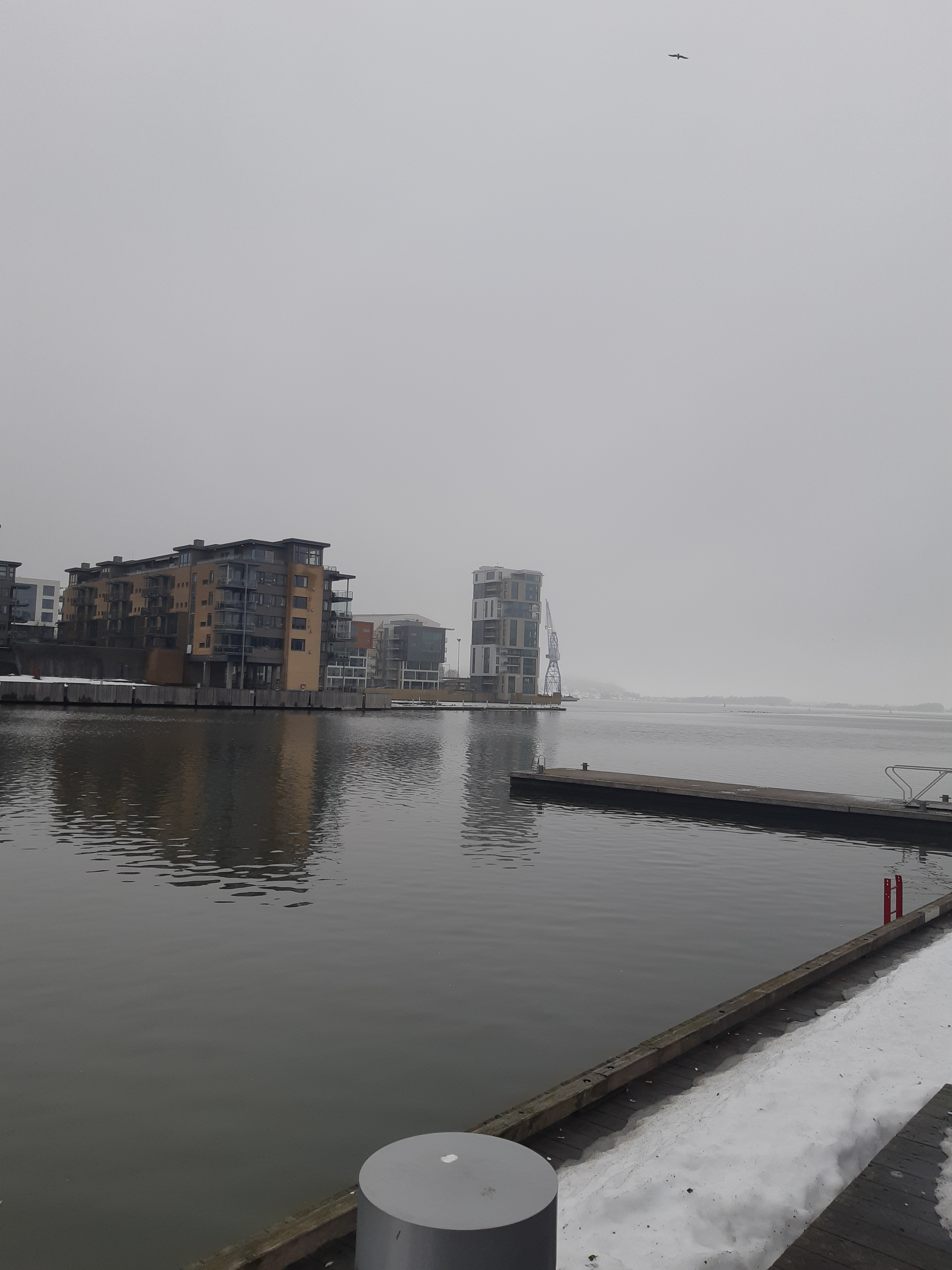
Signaturen seen from Tønsberg Brygge.
