= Bergen Region =

Coordinates: 60.3767°N 5.3353°E

Bergen Metropolitan Area
- Metropolitan Area
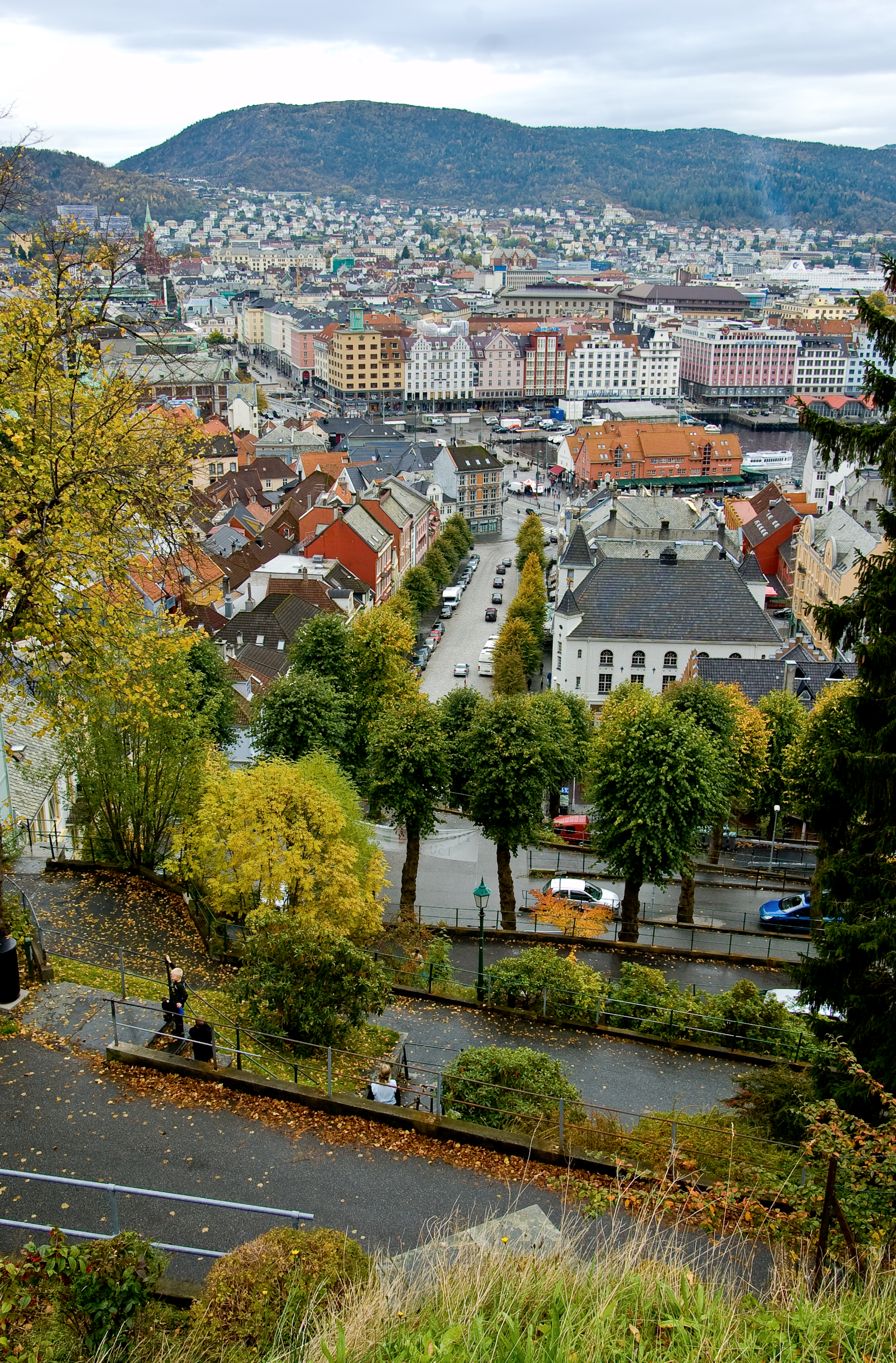
- View of the city centre with Torgallmenningen.
- Interactive map of Bergen Metropolitan Area
- Country: Norway
- County: Vestland
- Largest city: Bergen

Area
  - Total: 2,755 km^{2} (1,064 sq mi)

Population (October 2015)
  - Total: 416,033
  - Density: 149/km^{2} (390/sq mi)
- Time zone: UTC+01:00 (CET)
  - Summer (DST): UTC+02:00 (CEST)

The Bergen Region is a statistical metropolitan region in Vestland county, Norway. It is centered on the city of Bergen.

Region with current municipalities as of 2nd quarter of 2024
| Municipality | Population (2024) | Estimated population (2030) | Estimated population (2050) | Area (km^{2}) | Density (2022) (people/km^{2}) |
|---|---|---|---|---|---|
| Bergen | 292 277 | 298 834 | 318 096 | 465 | 638 |
| Askøy | 30 270 | 31 749 | 35 514 | 94 | 314 |
| Øygarden | 40 033 | 41 536 | 46 696 | 300 | 128 |
| Bjørnafjorden | 26 192 | 27 216 | 30 857 | 517 | 51 |
| Alver | 30 164 | 30 685 | 33 281 | 651 | 45 |
| Osterøy | 8 191 | 8 287 | 8 863 | 244 | 33 |
| Austevoll | 5 367 | 5 292 | 5 491 | 114 | 46 |
| Austrheim | 2 916 | 3 079 | 3 426 | 55 | 50 |
| Samnanger | 2 492 | 2 561 | 2 633 | 257 | 10 |
| Total | 437,998 | 449,239 | 484,657 | 2,397 | 179 |

== Old municipalities ==
On 1 January 2020, several municipalities in the Bergen region were merged due to a nationwide effort to reduce the number of Norwegian municipalities. Prior to this change the region included the municipalities below.

Region with historic municipalities as of January 2014
| Municipality | Population (1769) | Population (2014) | Est. pop. (2040) | Area (km^{2}) | Density (1769) (people/km^{2}) | Density (2014) (people/km^{2}) | Density (2040) (people/km^{2}) |
|---|---|---|---|---|---|---|---|
| Bergen | 18,827 | 278,556 | 338,891 | 465 | 40 | 600 | 729 |
| Askøy | 897 | 28,821 | 42,803 | 99 | 9 | 287 | 432 |
| Fjell | 923 | 25,204 | 33,551 | 147 | 6 | 169 | 228 |
| Os | 1,034 | 20,152 | 28,732 | 139 | 7 | 142 | 207 |
| Lindås | 2,931 | 15,731 | 19,635 | 474 | 6 | 32 | 41 |
| Osterøy | 1,636 | 8,026 | 10,182 | 254 | 6 | 30 | 40 |
| Meland | 794 | 8,021 | 12,753 | 91 | 8 | 84 | 140 |
| Sund | 970 | 7,058 | 10,013 | 99 | 9 | 67 | 101 |
| Austevoll | 1,265 | 5,156 | 7,124 | 114 | 11 | 43 | 62 |
| Radøy | 1,720 | 5,128 | 6,418 | 110 | 15 | 46 | 58 |
| Øygarden | 833 | 4,913 | 5,456 | 65 | 12 | 72 | 84 |
| Fusa | 1,692 | 3,895 | 4,180 | 378 | 4 | 10 | 11 |
| Austrheim | 636 | 2,884 | 4,283 | 55 | 11 | 51 | 78 |
| Samnanger | 947 | 2,488 | 2,654 | 265 | 3 | 9 | 10 |
| Total | 35,105 | 416,033 | 526,675 | 2,755 | 12 | 150 | 191 |

== See also ==
- Bergen og omland
- Western Norway
- Metropolitan regions of Norway
