= Greater Stavanger =

Statistical region of Norway

Coordinates: 59°N 6°E

Greater Stavanger Region is a statistical metropolitan region in the county of Rogaland in southwestern Norway. It is centered on the region's economical and cultural centre of Stavanger. The metropolitan area is the third most populous in Norway. The data below is from 2026.

Municipality	Population	Area (in km^{2})	Density (Pop. per km^{2})
Stavanger Municipality	151,669	262	578
Sandnes Municipality	85,785	1041	82
Sola Municipality	29,541	69	428
Klepp Municipality	21,444	113	189
Time Municipality	20,461	183	112
Hå Municipality	20,087	258	78
Strand Municipality	13,959	262	53
Gjesdal Municipality	12,715	618	21
Randaberg Municipality	11,841	25	479
Kvitsøy Municipality	579	6	92
Total	368,081	2,837	130

== See also ==
- Metropolitan Regions of Norway
