= Selvaag Bolig =

Norwegian property developer

Selvaag Bolig ASA
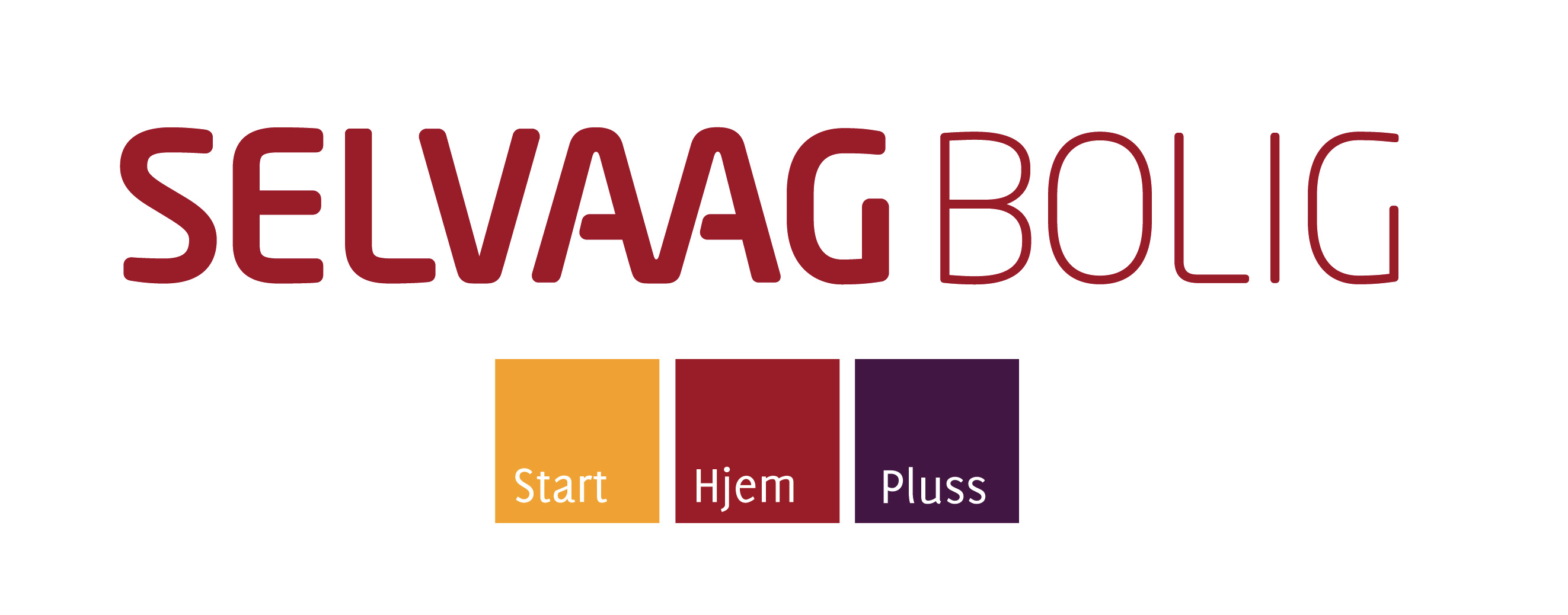
- Company type: Allmennaksjeselskap
- Traded as: OSE: SBO
- Industry: Real estate development
- Founded: 2008
- Headquarters: Oslo, Norway
- Number of employees: 60 (2026)
- Website: www.selvaagbolig.no

Selvaag Bolig ASA is a residential property developer, headquartered in Oslo, Norway. The company was established in 2008 when Selvaag Group's property development activities was separated into a new company.

The main focus for the company is the Greater Oslo Region, Bergen and Stavanger, in addition to developments in Stockholm, Sweden. By the end of 2013, Selvaag Bolig had 1,474 homes under construction.

Selvaag Bolig considered a public listing the company in 2011, but was listed on the Oslo Stock Exchange in June 2012. The IPO valued the company at 1.4 billion NOK.

== Subsidiaries ==
- Selvaag Bolig Modulbygg (Develops apartment buildings and terrace houses)
- Meglerhuset Selvaag (Real estate agency)
- Selvaag Pluss Service (Concierge services)
