= Lilleberge Viking Burial =

Viking hoard

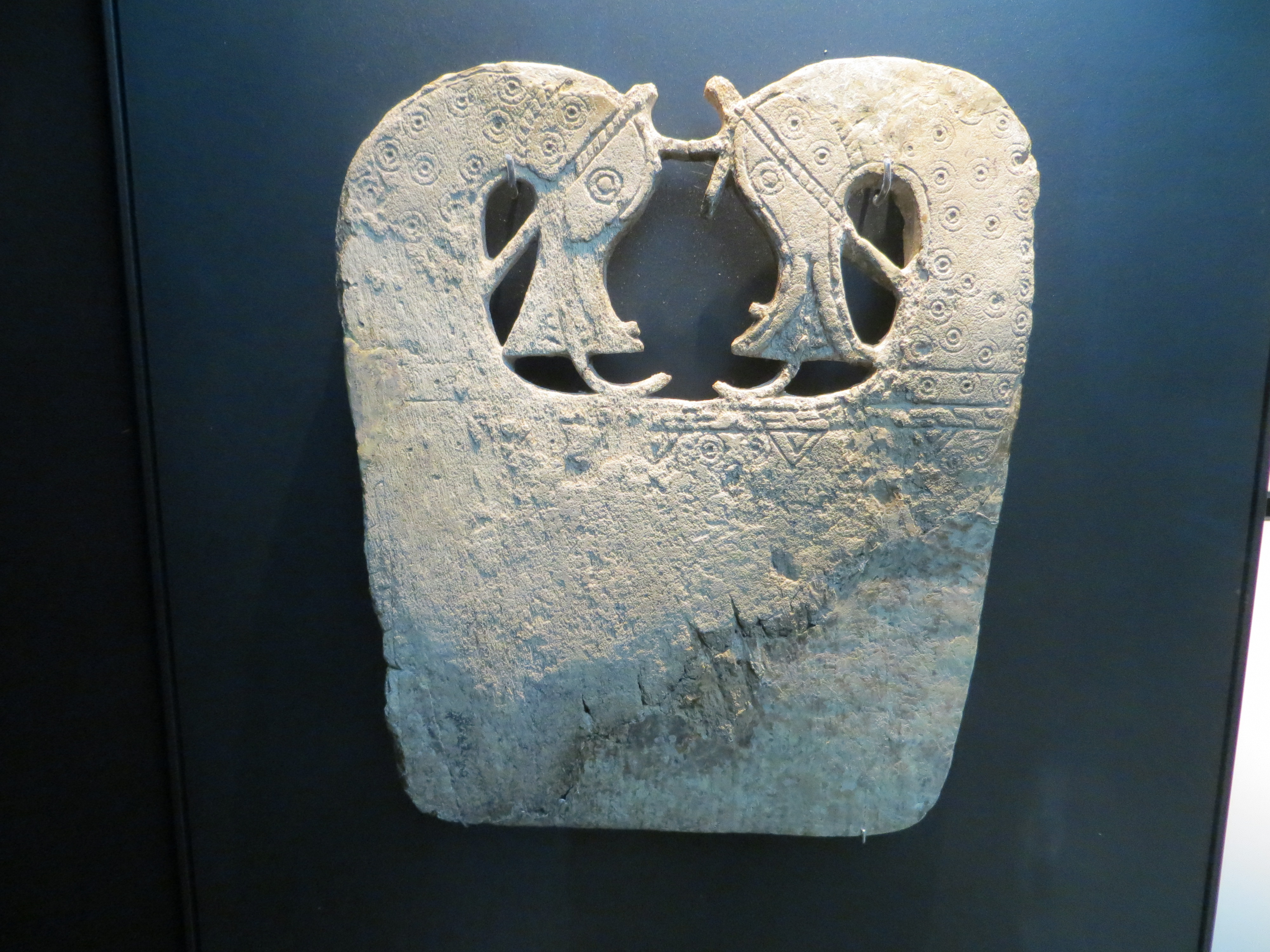
- Whalebone plaque from the Lilleberge grave group as displayed in the British Museum
- Size: Ht 23 cm, Width 20 cm
- Created: 9th-10th Centuries AD
- Period/culture: Viking
- Present location: British Museum
- Identification: 1891,1021.67

The Lilleberge Viking Burial or Lilleberge Ship Burial is a major hoard of Viking objects found in a barrow at Lilleberge in Namdalen, central Norway in the late nineteenth century. Since 1891, it has been an important part of the British Museum's early medieval collection.

== Discovery ==
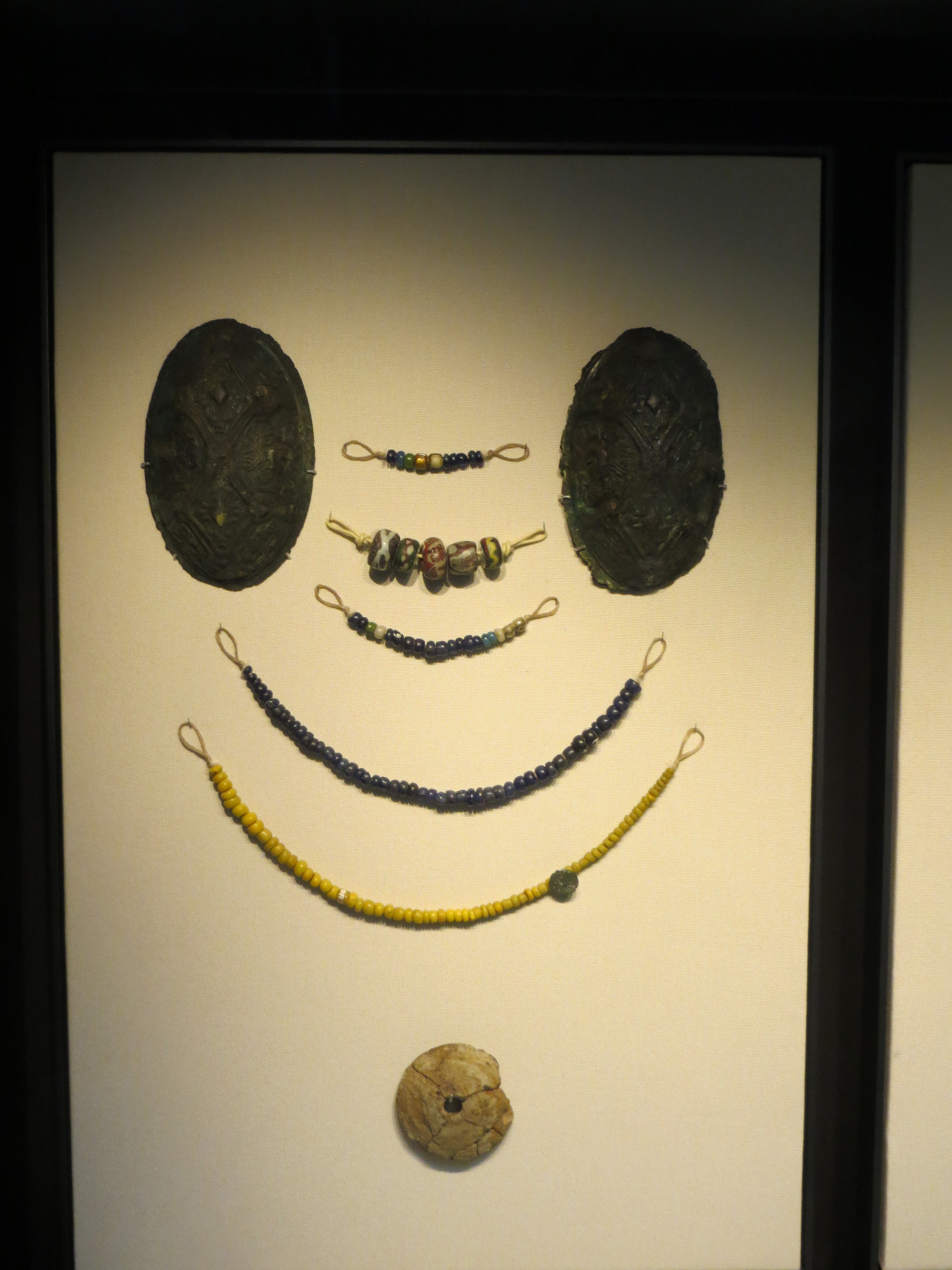
Viking jewellery and other objects from the grave group.

Lilleberge is located in Nord-Trøndelag county in the district of Namdalen. A large ship barrow in the vicinity of Lilleberge was excavated in the 1886 by the British archaeologist, Alfred Heneage Cocks. The barrow was over 40 metres in length and contained a ship that was 10 metres long. Cocks later took all the finds to England and sold them to the British Museum in 1891.

== Description ==
The grave group from Lilleberge represents an important assemblage of Viking jewellery and other artefacts that belonged to a prominent female dignitary from the local tribe. Probably the most significant object from the burial is the almost intact whalebone plaque which may have served as a cutting board for food or as a surface to smooth items of clothing.

Other objects from Lilleberge include a pair of copper alloy oval brooches, necklaces made of coloured glass beads, a spindle-whorl, a gilded Celtic mount (that was only recently discovered in the British Museum's stores), an iron pot stand, rivets from a Viking boat and skeletal remains from the deceased.

== See also ==
- Scar boat burial for a similar whalebone plaque
- Port an Eilean Mhòir ship burial
- Tromsø Burial
- Tumulus burial from Villa Farm in Vestnes
