= Trondheim og omland =

Economic region in Trøndelag, Norway

Coordinates: 64°00′50″N 11°28′39″E

Historical population
Year	Pop.	±%
1769	25,763	—
1951	125,538	+387.3%
1960	144,602	+15.2%
1970	167,063	+15.5%
1980	179,746	+7.6%
1990	186,854	+4.0%
2000	201,035	+7.6%
2010	228,392	+13.6%
2020	253,860	+11.2%
2030?	282,024	+11.1%
Source: Statistics Norway

Trondheim og omland is an economic region in Trøndelag county, Norway. It consists of the municipalities of Trondheim, Indre Fosen, Midtre Gauldal, Melhus, Skaun, Malvik, Selbu, Stjørdal and Tydal. The center of the region is the city of Trondheim.

== See also ==
- Trondheim Region
- Bergen og omland
