= Skogsvågen =

Village in Øygarden Municipality, Norway

Skogsvågen Skogsvåg (unofficial)
- Village
- Interactive map of Skogsvågen
- Coordinates: 60.25512°N 5.10163°E
- Country: Norway
- Region: Western Norway
- County: Vestland
- District: Midhordland
- Municipality: Øygarden Municipality

Area
  - Total: 0.47 km^{2} (0.18 sq mi)
- Elevation: 24 m (79 ft)

Population (2025)
  - Total: 550
  - Density: 1,170/km^{2} (3,000/sq mi)
- Time zone: UTC+01:00 (CET)
  - Summer (DST): UTC+02:00 (CEST)
- Post Code: 5382 Skogsvåg

Skogsvågen is a village in Øygarden Municipality in Vestland county, Norway. The village is located on the eastern coast of the island of Sotra, just northeast of the village of Hammarsland. The village is the site of Sund senter (a shopping center), Skogsvåg kindergarten, Skogsvåg stadium for football and athletics, Sotra Upper Secondary School, and the Sund og Sundheimen nursing home.

The 0.47-square-kilometre (120-acre) village has a population (2025) of 550 and a population density of 1,170 inhabitants per square kilometre (3,000/sq mi).

== History ==
The village was the administrative centre of the old Sund Municipality which existed until 2020.
