= Larvik/Sandefjord Region =

Region of Vestfold, Norway

Larvik/Sandefjord Region is a metropolitan region in Vestfold county in southeastern Norway. It is centered on the cities of Larvik and Sandefjord.

Municipalities in the region.
Municipality	Population (2026 data)	Area (in km^{2})	Density (people per km^{2})
Larvik Municipality	49,022	812.88	63.5
Sandefjord Municipality	67,062	422.25	161.9
Total	116,084	1235.13	94
