= Haugesund Region =

Metropolitan region in Western Norway

Coordinates: 59.4138°N 5.2680°E

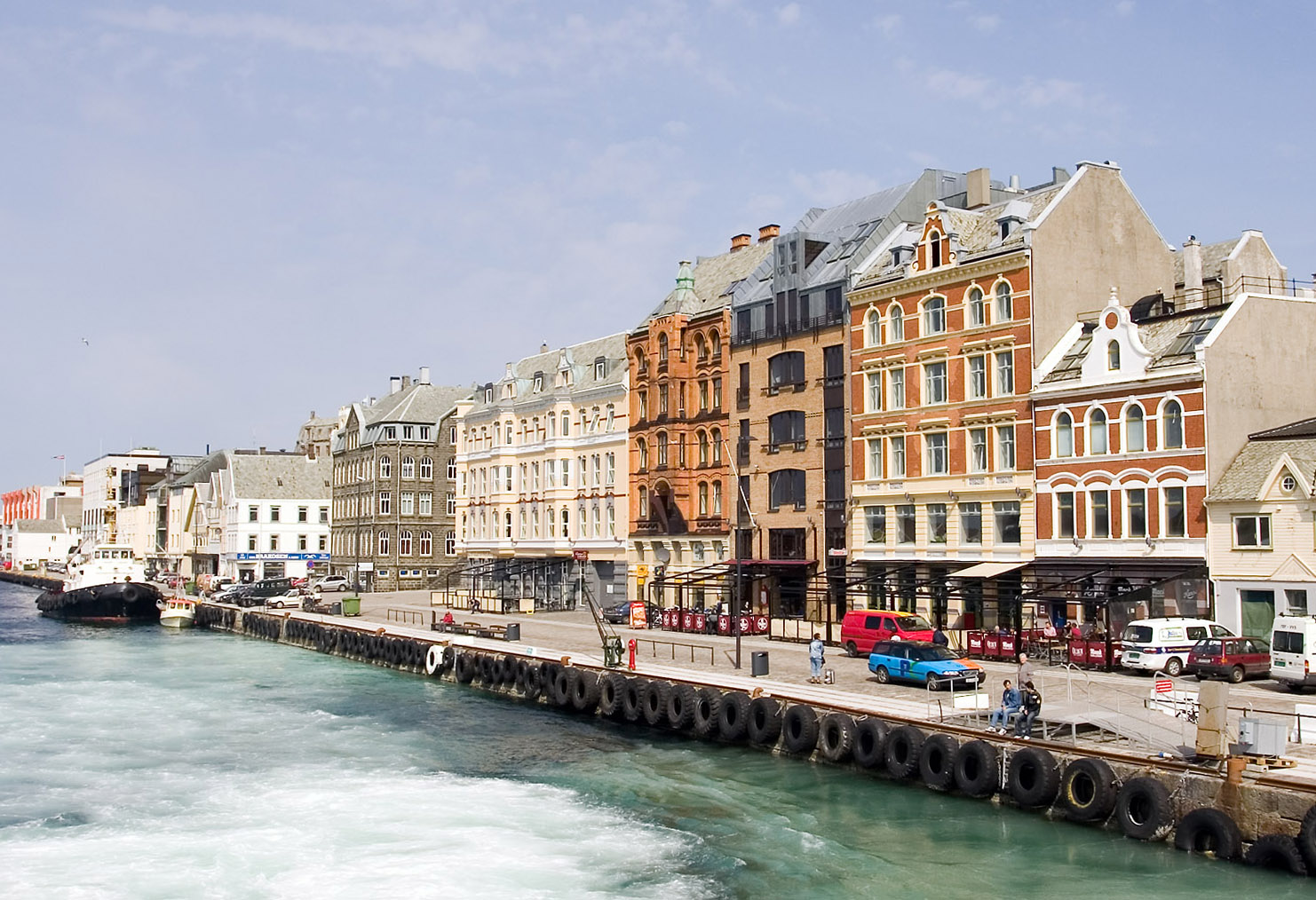
The pier in Haugesund, 2006.

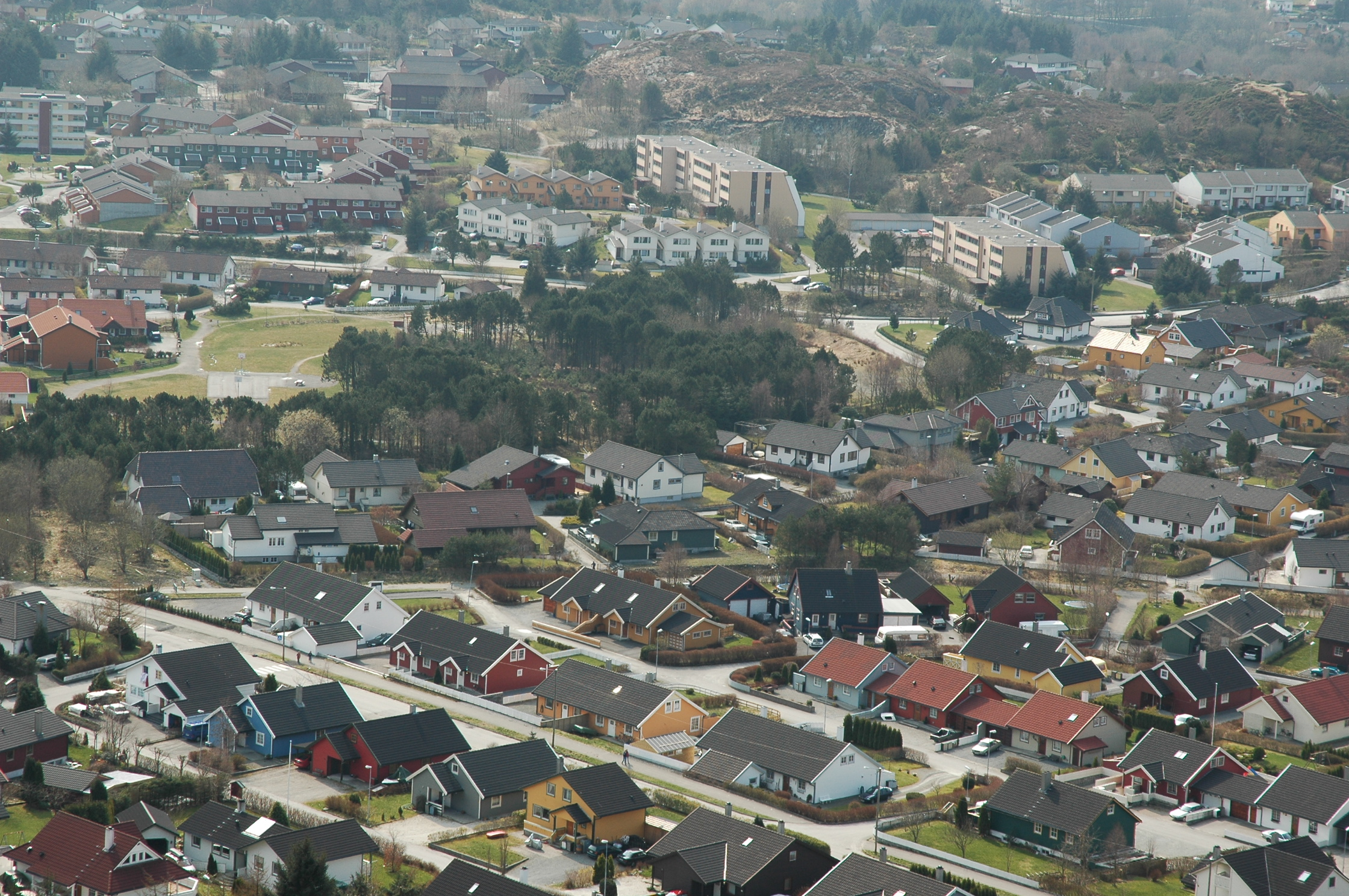
Bleikemyr in Haugesund, 2005.

The Haugesund Region (Norwegian: Haugesundregionen) is a geographically distinct city region in Norway, consisting of the five municipalities of Haugesund, Karmøy, Tysvær, Sveio, and Bokn. As of 1 January 2026, the region has a total population of 101,076. The region is mainly located on the Haugaland in Rogaland county, with the exception of Sveio, which belongs to the Sunnhordland district in Vestland county.

The Haugesund Region is one of Norway's officially defined statistical metropolitan areas and is classified as a city region (byregion). The classification originates from the Norwegian government's white paper on large cities (Storbymeldingen), prepared by the Ministry of Local Government and Regional Development in 2002–2003 to establish a coherent national policy for the development of metropolitan areas. The report was presented to the Storting on 12 March 2003 by then Minister of Local Government and Regional Development, Erna Solberg. In this framework, Norway was divided into one metropolitan region, six greater city regions (storbyregioner), and ten city regions (byregioner). Each region is defined by a central urban municipality and a selection of surrounding municipalities.

== Municipalities ==
The Haugesund Region is divided into four municipalities in Rogaland county and one in Vestland county:

Number	Map	Name	Adm. centre	Population	Area km²	Lang. form	Mayor	Political party
1106	Haugesund Municipality	Haugesund Municipality	Haugesund	38,663	72.67	Neutral	Nils Konrad Bua	Conservative
1149	Karmøy Municipality	Karmøy Municipality	Kopervik	43,990	229.90	Neutral	Leiv Arne Marhaug	Conservative
1146	Tysvær Municipality	Tysvær Municipality	Aksdal	11,750	425.41	Neutral	Monika Lindanger	Conservative
4612	Sveio Municipality	Sveio Municipality	Sveio	5,766	246.15	Nynorsk	André Mundal Haukås	Conservative
1145	Bokn Municipality	Bokn Municipality	Føresvik	907	47.17	Nynorsk	Egil Våge	Centre

== See also ==
- Metropolitan regions of Norway
