= Tønsberg Region =

Statistical region in Norway

Tønsberg Region Tønsberg-regionen
- Statistical metropolitan region
- Interactive map of Tønsberg Region
- Coordinates: 59.2698°N 10.4076°E
- Country: Norway
- County: Vestfold

Area
  - Metro: 933 km^{2} (360 sq mi)

Population (2020)
  - Metro: 135,073

Tønsberg Region is a statistical metropolitan region in Vestfold county in southeastern Norway. It is centered on the city of Tønsberg. As of 2020, the region has a population of approximately 135,073 and covers an area of 933 km².

Following the Norwegian municipal reforms of 2017–2018, the region is composed of four municipalities: Tønsberg Municipality, Horten Municipality, Holmestrand Municipality, and Færder Municipality. Several earlier constituent municipalities were absorbed by these units: Andebu Municipality, Stokke Municipality, and Re Municipality merged into Tønsberg and Sandefjord Municipality, while Nøtterøy Municipality and Tjøme Municipality merged to form Færder Municipality.

| Municipality | Population (2020) | Area (km²) |
|---|---|---|
| Tønsberg Municipality | 52,419 | 106 |
| Horten Municipality | 27,800 | 68 |
| Holmestrand Municipality | 24,200 | 338 |
| Færder Municipality | 26,000 | 221 |
| Total | ~135,073 | ~933 |

== See also ==
- Metropolitan Regions of Norway
