= Mjøsa Cities =

The Mjøsa Cities (Norwegian: Mjøsbyene) is the name of a metropolitan region around the lake Mjøsa in Innlandet county, Norway. Usually the name Mjøsbyene refers specifically to the three cities of Gjøvik, Hamar, and Lillehammer. The name is also used as a general reference to the whole area of the three cities and surrounding countryside. The largest of those cities is Hamar.

Data about the Mjøsa Cities region (from 2025)
Municipality	Population	Area (in km^{2})	Density (people per km^{2})
Gausdal Municipality	6,174	1,146	5.2
Gjøvik Municipality	31,175	629	46.5
Hamar Municipality	33,441	338	95.3
Lillehammer Municipality	29,011	451	60.7
Løten Municipality	7,931	362	21.5
Ringsaker Municipality	35,911	1,123	28.1
Stange Municipality	21,691	641	29.9
Vestre Toten Municipality	13,649	233	54.4
Østre Toten Municipality	14,827	485	26.4
Øyer Municipality	5,134	616	8
Total	198,944	6,024	33
