= Sund Church =

Church in Vestland, Norway

- Sund kyrkje
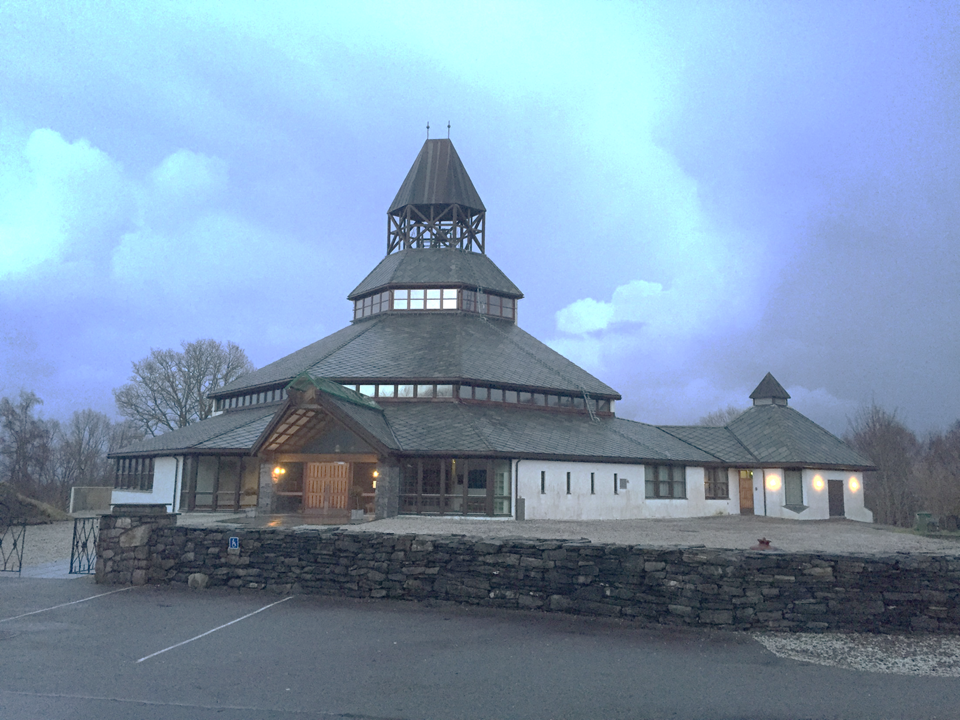
- View of the church
- Sund Church
- 60°13′32″N 5°08′53″E
- Location: Øygarden Municipality, Vestland
- Country: Norway
- Denomination: Church of Norway
- Previous denomination: Catholic Church
- Churchmanship: Evangelical Lutheran

History
- Status: Parish church
- Founded: 13th century
- Consecrated: 18 May 1997
- Events: 1994: Fire

Architecture
- Functional status: Active
- Architect: Peder A. Ristesund
- Architectural type: Fan-shaped
- Completed: 1997 (29 years ago)

Specifications
- Capacity: 350
- Materials: Concrete

Administration
- Diocese: Bjørgvin bispedømme
- Deanery: Vesthordland prosti
- Parish: Sund
- Norwegian Cultural Heritage Site
- Type: Church
- Status: Not protected
- ID: 84999

Sund Church (Norwegian: Sund kyrkje) is a parish church of the Church of Norway in Øygarden Municipality in Vestland county, Norway. It is located in the village of Klokkarvik on the island of Sotra. It is the church for the Sund parish which is part of the Vesthordland prosti (deanery) in the Diocese of Bjørgvin. The white concrete and wood church was built in a fan-shaped design in 1997 using plans drawn up by the architect Peder A. Ristesund. The church seats about 350 people.

== History ==
The earliest existing historical records of the church date back to the year 1337, but the church was built before that time. The first church in Sund was a wooden stave church that was likely built during the 13th century. During the early 1300s, the church had a fire and needed repairs. In an inspection report from the 1660s, the church was described as being in poor condition. In 1673, the old church was torn down and replaced with a new timber-framed long church on the same site. The new church was completed in 1674. Some of the materials from the old church were reused in the construction of the new church. The church nave measured about 12.5 by 10 metres (41 ft × 33 ft) and the choir measured about 7.5 by 7.5 metres (25 ft × 25 ft). The church had a large tower above a church porch that measured about 5 by 5 metres (16 ft × 16 ft). The church building was sold to Abraham Wessel from Bergen in 1725 during the great church auction where the King sold hundreds of churches to help pay off debts from the Great Northern War.

In 1814, this church served as an election church (Norwegian: valgkirke). Together with more than 300 other parish churches across Norway, it was a polling station for elections to the 1814 Norwegian Constituent Assembly which wrote the Constitution of Norway. This was Norway's first national elections. Each church parish was a constituency that elected people called "electors" who later met together in each county to elect the representatives for the assembly that was to meet at Eidsvoll Manor later that year.

In 1870, the people in the congregation bought the church back from private ownership and the church then was owned outright by the parish. At that time, the old church was deemed too small, and so work immediately began on planning for a new church. The foundation stone of the new church was laid on 6 June 1876. The new church was built about 20 metres (66 ft) to the north of the old church. The architects of the new building were Conrad Fredrik von der Lippe and Hans Heinrich Jess. The new church was consecrated on 16 November 1877. In 1878, after the new church was completed, the old church was torn down. The steeple from the old church was saved and moved to Kausland and it was used in the construction of the new Kausland Church which was built a couple of years later. In 1977, the church received a small extension on each side of the tower with a baptismal sacristy, a cloakroom, and a bathroom.

On 13 March 1994, the old church burned to the ground. A new concrete church was built in 1997 on roughly the same site as the previous church. The church was designed by the architect Peder A. Ristesund. The new building was consecrated on 18 May 1997. The church seats about 350 people. The building was constructed out of concrete that is covered with white plaster on the inside and outside.

== Media gallery ==
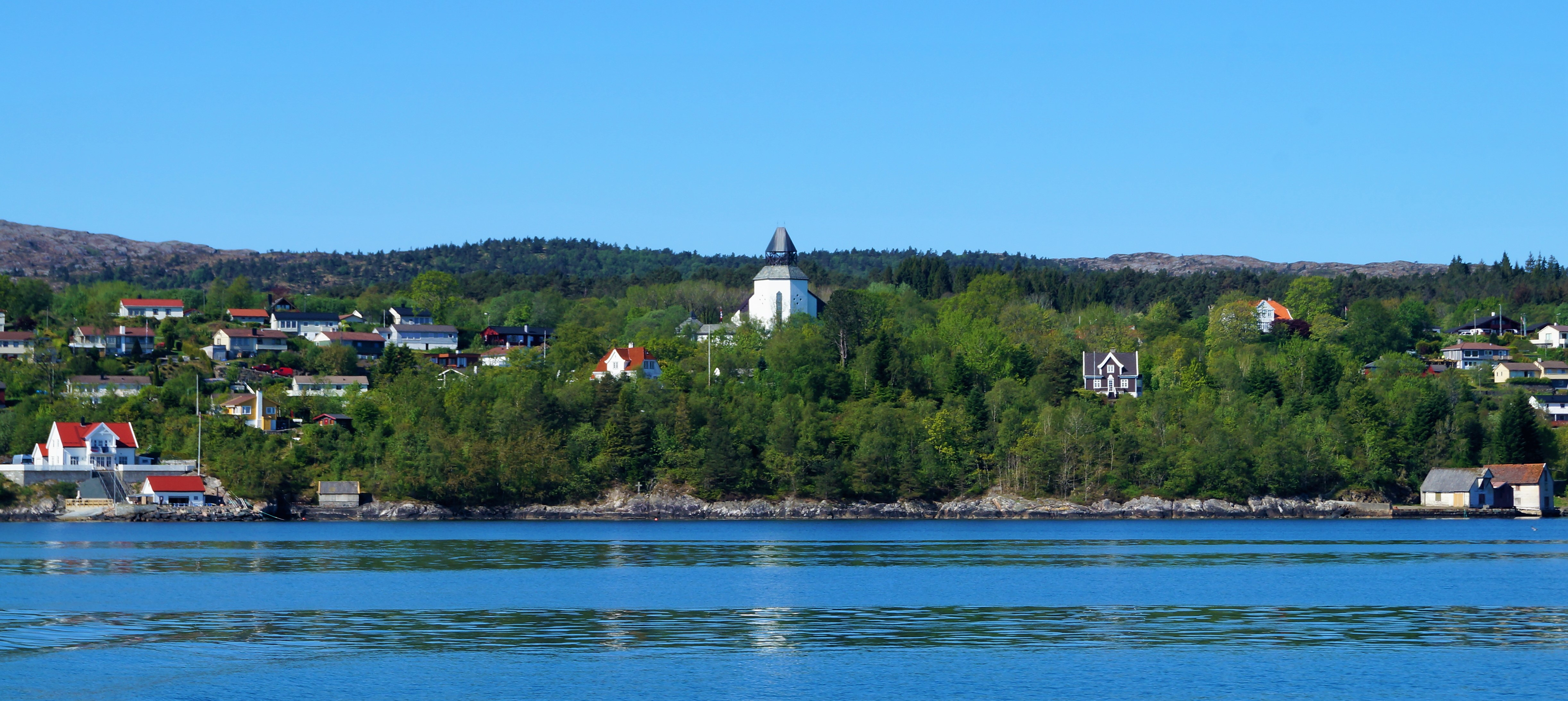

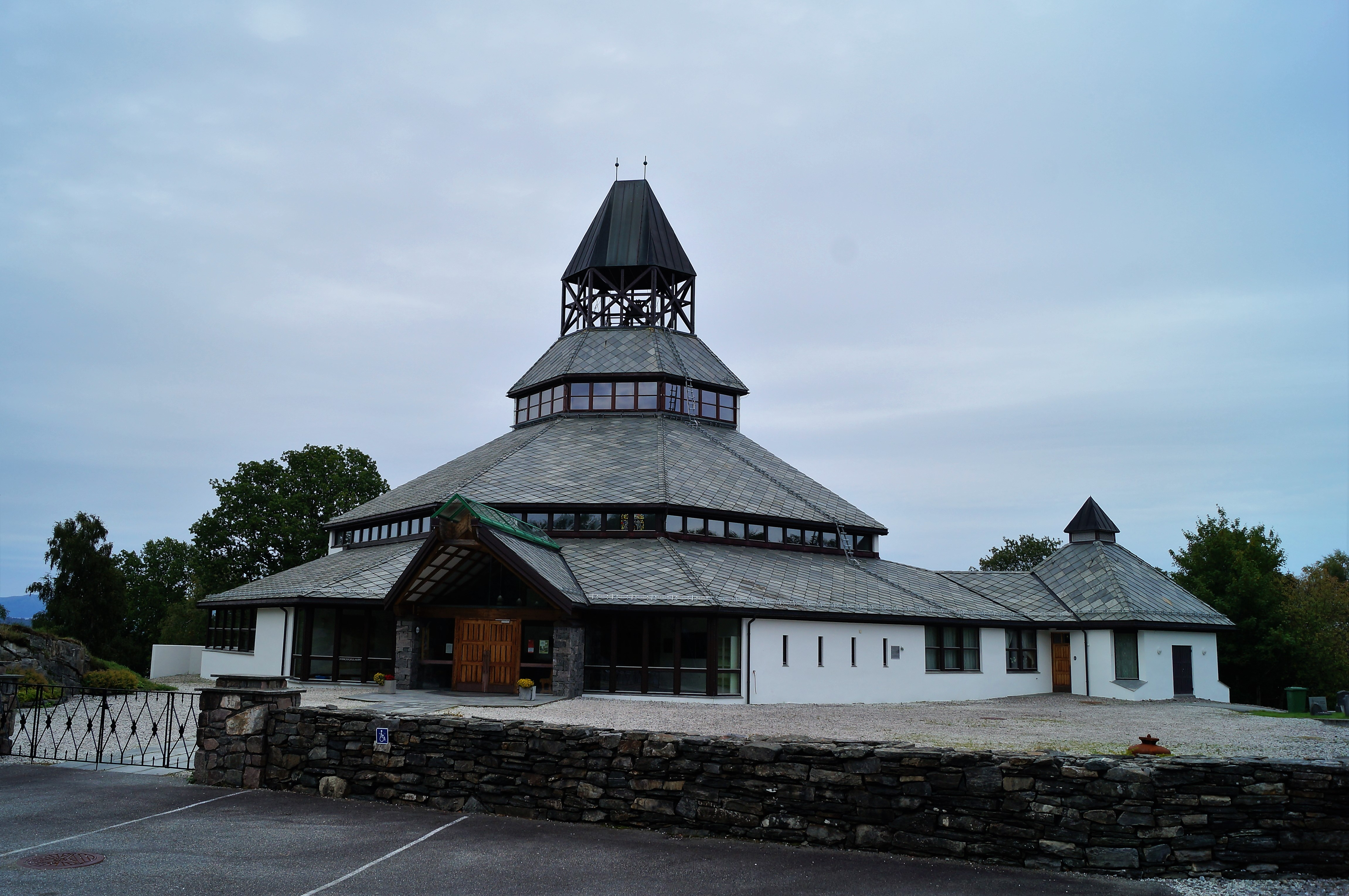

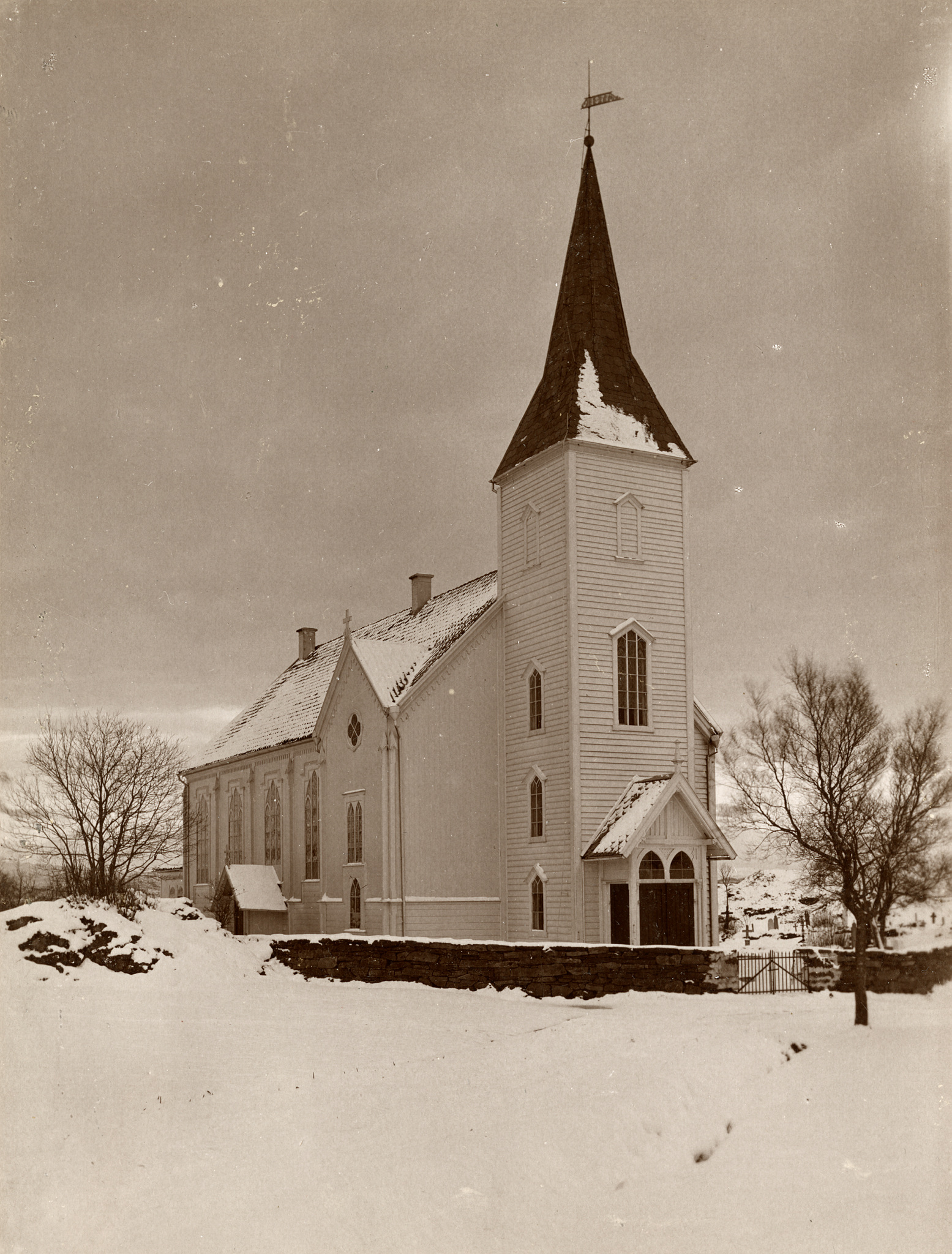
Old church (1877–1994)

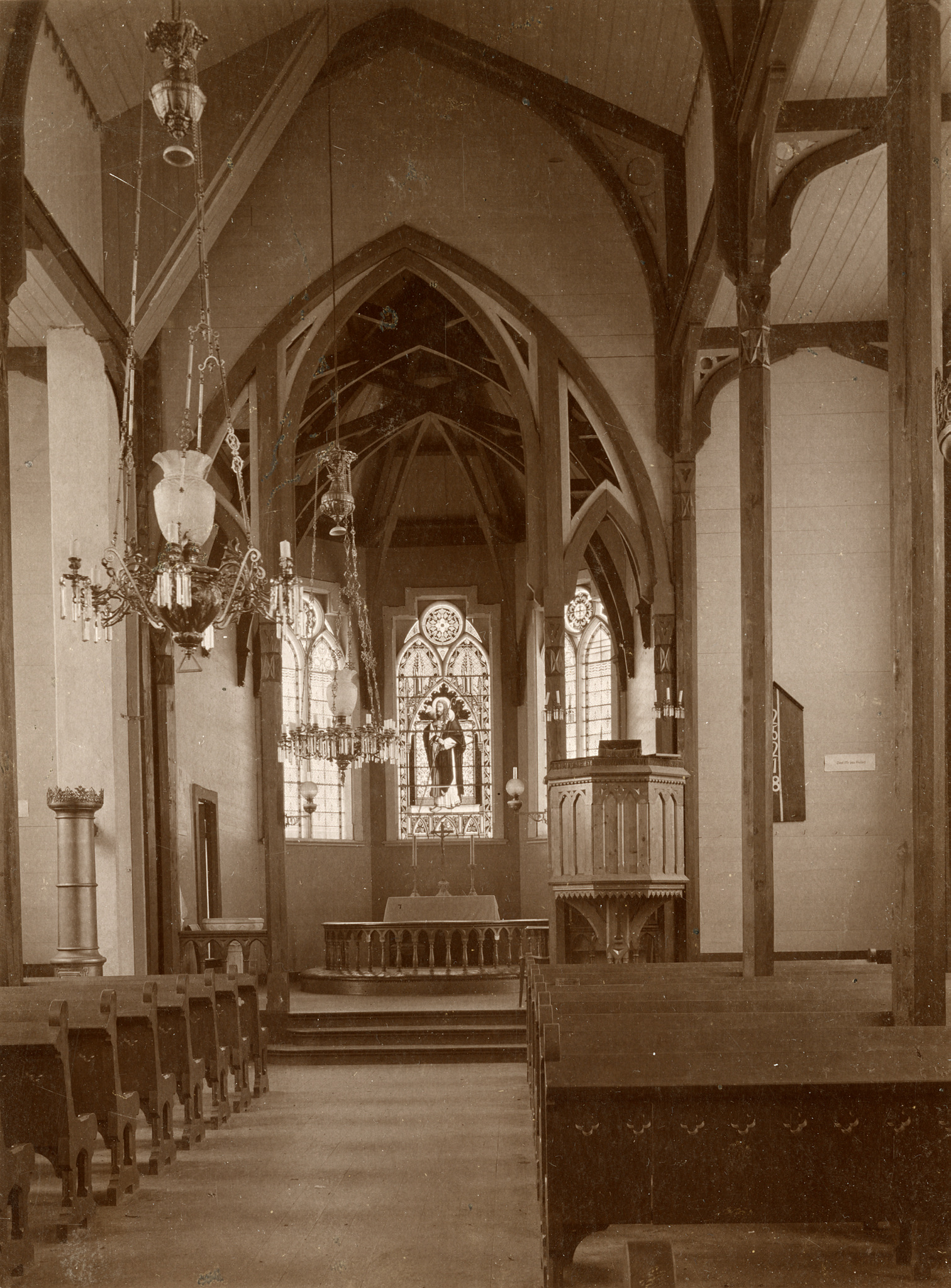
Interior of the old church

== See also ==
- List of churches in Bjørgvin
