= Bergen og omland =

Coordinates: 60°29′23″N 5°28′16″E

- District
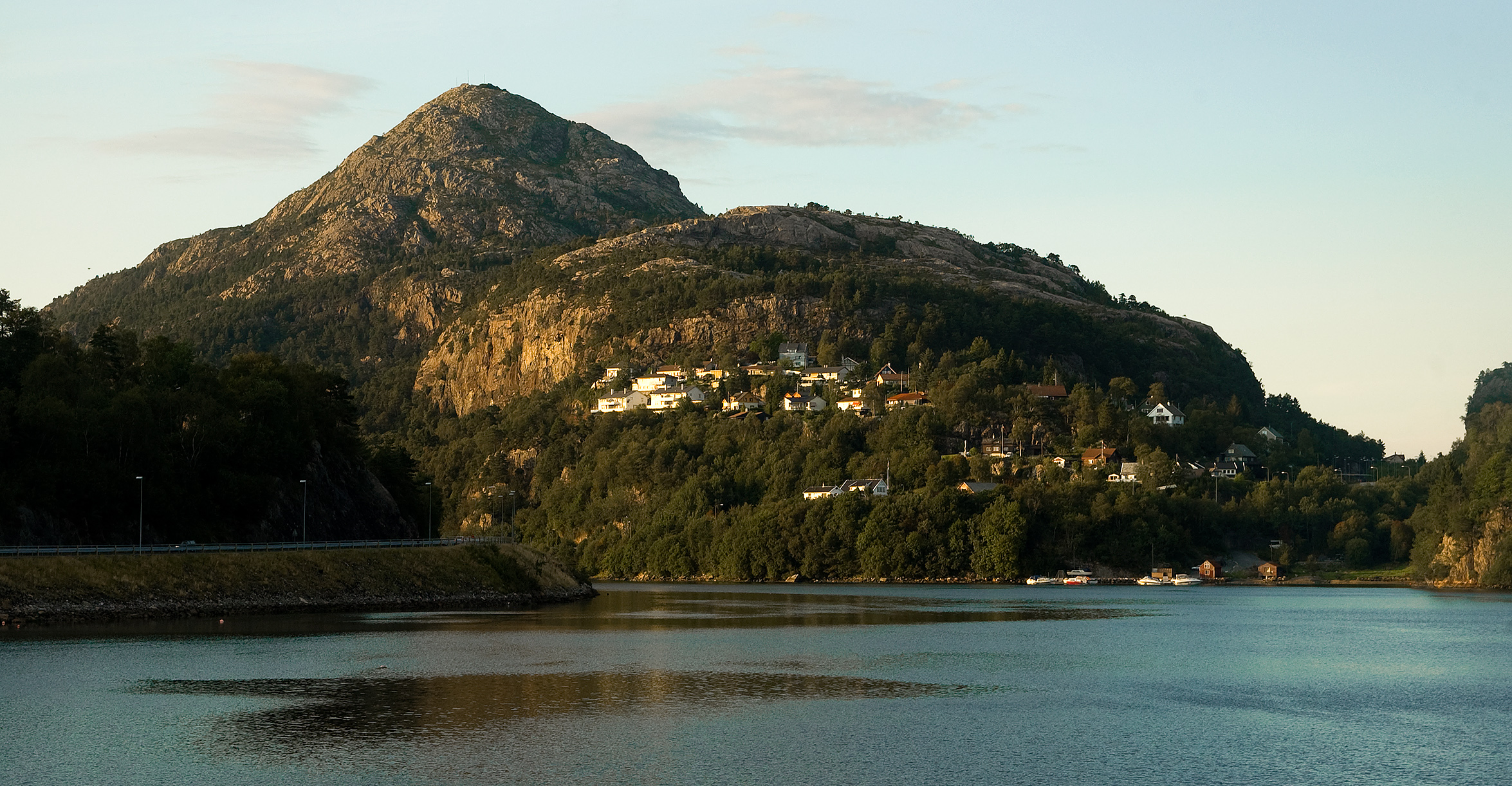
- Lyderhorn, one of the seven mountains.

- Hordaland: Bergen og omland in red
- Country: Norway
- County: Vestland
- Region: Vestlandet
- Commercial Center: Bergen

Area
  - Total: 4,472 km^{2} (1,727 sq mi)

Population (2009)
  - Total: 382,165
  - Density: 85.46/km^{2} (221.3/sq mi)

Bergen og omland is a region in Vestland county, Norway. It consists of the districts Midthordland and Nordhordland. The center is the city of Bergen.

== Municipalities ==
The region includes the municipalities of Alver, Askøy, Austevoll, Austrheim, Bergen, Bjørnafjorden, Fedje, Masfjorden, Modalen, Osterøy, Samnanger, Vaksdal, Øygarden. Sometimes Tysnes, Kvam, Voss along with the whole district of Sogn are included in the economic region "Bergen og omland".

== Demographics ==
Historical population

Year	Pop.	±%
1769	37,725	—
1951	226,936	+501.6%
1960	255,612	+12.6%
1970	283,555	+10.9%
1980	298,344	+5.2%

Year	Pop.	±%
1990	314,449	+5.4%
2000	339,417	+7.9%
2010?	383,465	+13.0%
2020?	436,382	+13.8%
2030?	485,113	+11.2%

Source: Statistics Norway

== See also ==
- Bergen Region
- Trondheim og omland
