= Kausland =

Village in Øygarden Municipality, Norway

- Village
- Interactive map of Kausland
- Coordinates: 60.22757°N 5.04373°E
- Country: Norway
- Region: Western Norway
- County: Vestland
- District: Midhordland
- Municipality: Øygarden Municipality
- Elevation: 29 m (95 ft)
- Time zone: UTC+01:00 (CET)
  - Summer (DST): UTC+02:00 (CEST)
- Post Code: 5381 Glesvær

Kausland is a village in Øygarden Municipality in Vestland county, Norway. The village is located on the southern part of the island of Sotra, about 4 kilometres (2.5 mi) southwest of the village of Hammarsland and about 5 kilometres (3.1 mi) southeast of the village of Tælavåg. Kausland Church, founded in 1881, is located in this village.
