= Tromsø Burial =

Viking hoard

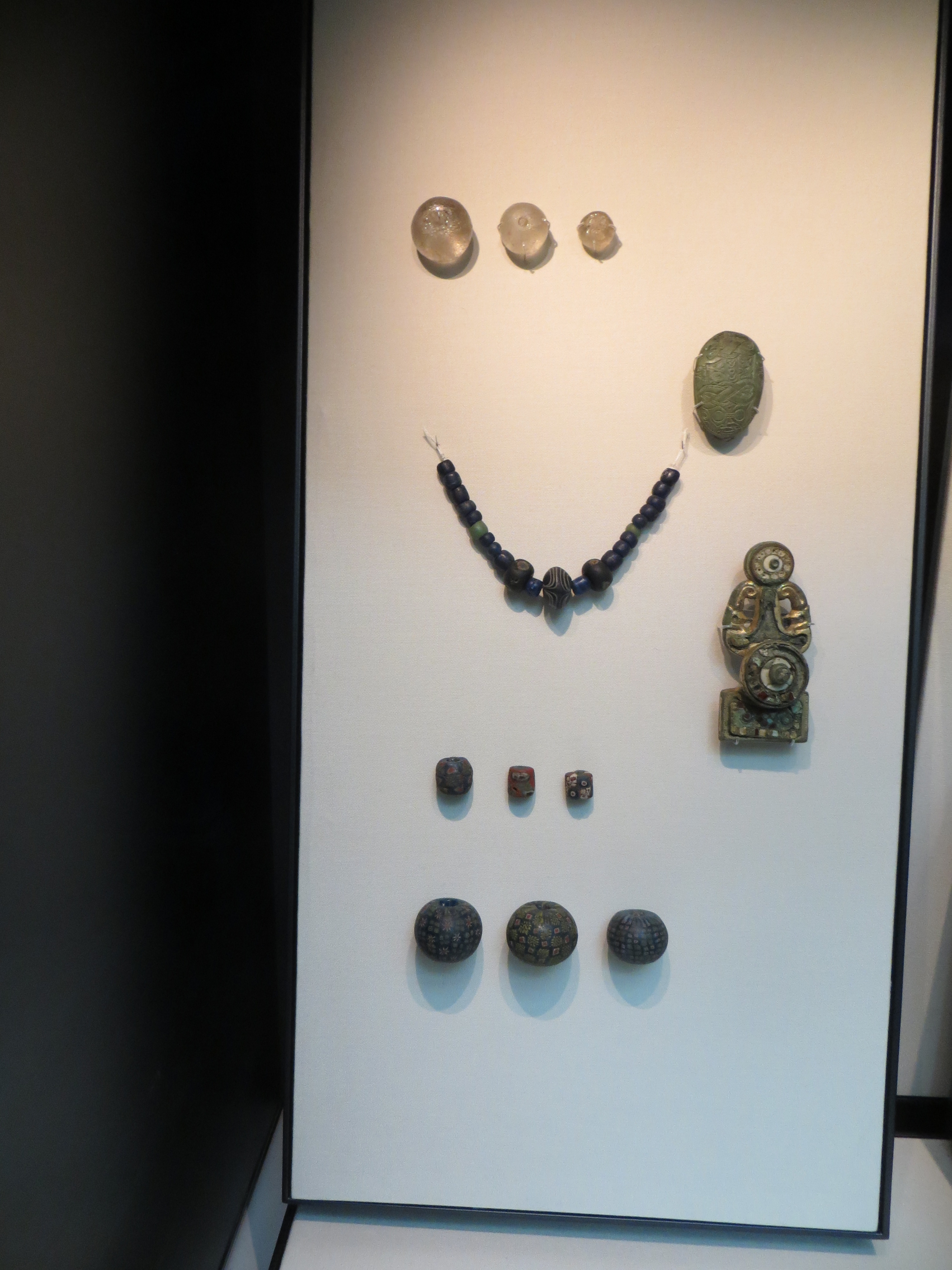
- The grave group from Tromsø as displayed in the British Museum
- Created: 7th-8th Centuries AD
- Period/culture: Viking
- Present location: British Museum
- Identification: 1900,0518.1-13

The Tromsø Burial or Tromsø Grave Group is a significant hoard of Viking objects found near Tromsø, in the far north of Norway, in the late nineteenth century. Since 1900, the group has been part of the British Museum's early medieval collection.

== Discovery ==
This group of jewellery was found in a woman's grave near Tromsø in the late nineteenth century by the famous English adventurer Arnold Pike, who also spent the 1888/89 winter exploring the island of Spitsbergen. Pike is said to have excavated several mounds on the island of Tussøya, where this grave group was discovered, although the exact provenance remains sketchy. All the objects from the woman's grave were purchased by the British Museum in 1900.

== Description ==
The hoard consists of various items of jewellery that were made in different parts of Europe. The two brooches are typically Scandinavian in design, but the patterned millefiori glass beads were imported from the Frankish kingdoms. The oval Viking brooch is decorated with a complex interlace pattern and the form of an unusual-looking animal, that seen from above, appears to cross its legs over its back. Other objects include a gilt copper disc-on-bow brooch, three rock crystal beads, a spindle-whorl and a necklace made of twenty two glass beads.

== See also ==
- Lilleberge Viking Burial
