= Greater Oslo Region =

Coordinates: 59°57′N 10°45′E

Greater Oslo Region Oslo-regionen
- Urban area
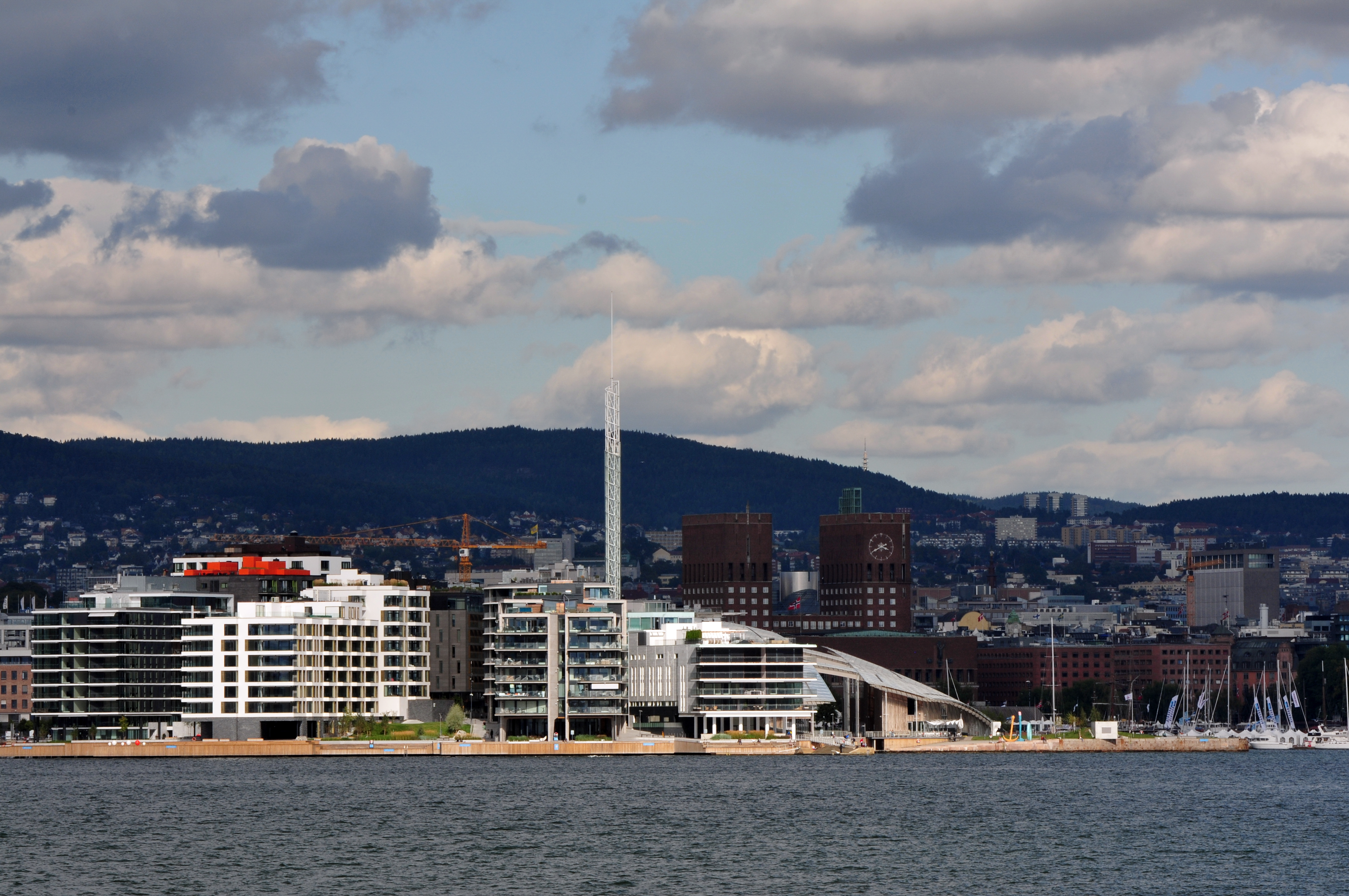
- Skyline of Oslo

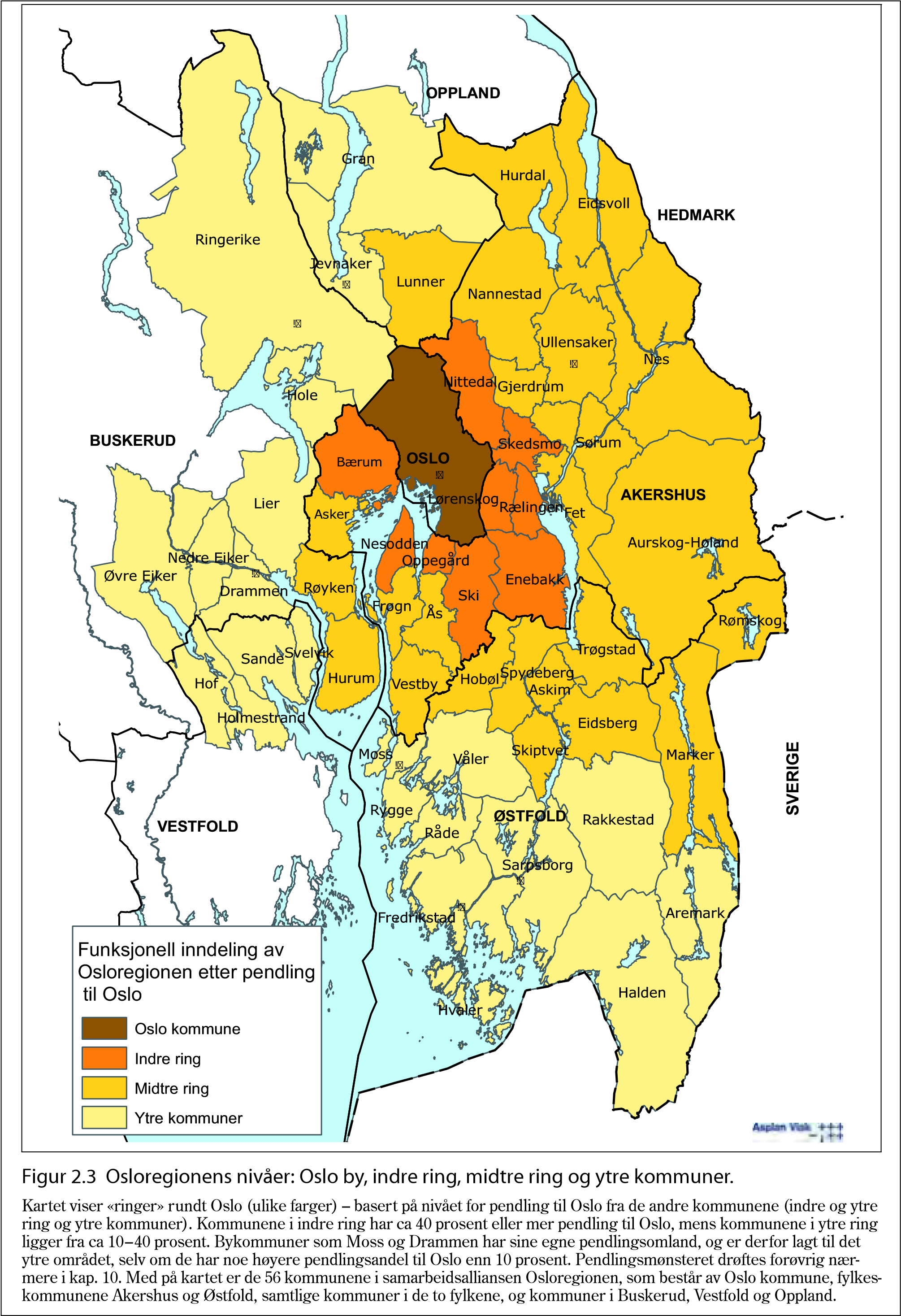
- The Oslo region's levels - Oslo city, inner ring, middle ring and outer municipalities
- Country: Norway
- Largest city: Oslo

Area
  - Metro: 8,894 km^{2} (3,434 sq mi)

Population
  - Metro: 1,954,329
  - Metro density: 219/km^{2} (570/sq mi)

GDP
  - Metro: €132.716 billion (2021)

Greater Oslo Region ("Stor-Oslo-regionen" in Norwegian) is a statistical metropolitan region surrounding the Norwegian capital of Oslo, with a total number of inhabitants of 1,954,329 as of 1 January 2025.

The region includes the city proper of Oslo (population: 725,243), Akershus and Østfold county, parts of the county of Buskerud, as well as Holmestrand Municipality in the county of Vestfold.

There is also another definition of the Greater Oslo Region, which excludes the Moss and Drammen regions. This definition has 34 municipalities and had a population of 1,323,244 on 1 January 2015.

== Economy ==
In 2020 Oslo gross metropolitan product was €64.5 billion.

== Statistics ==
Municipality (Kommune)	Inhabitants 2010	Inhabitants 2011	Inhabitants 1. January 2025	Region	County	
Oslo	586 860	599 230	725 243	Oslo	Oslo	Greater Oslo
Lillestrøm	73 330	74 869	95 978	Inner sector north	Akershus	Greater Oslo
Lørenskog	32 730	33 308	50 447	Inner sector north	Akershus	Greater Oslo
Nittedal	20 939	21 165	25 988	Inner sector north	Akershus	Greater Oslo
Rælingen	15 591	15 920	20 628	Inner sector north	Akershus	Greater Oslo
Enebakk	10 176	10 262	11 537	Inner sector south	Akershus	Greater Oslo
Nesodden	17 348	17 515	20 738	Inner sector south	Akershus	Greater Oslo
Nordre Follo	52 905	57 686	64 829	Inner sector south	Akershus	Greater Oslo
Bærum	111 213	112 789	132 578	Inner sector west	Akershus	Greater Oslo
Aurskog-Høland	14 982	15 310	18 339	Outer sector north	Akershus	Greater Oslo
Eidsvoll	20 689	21 128	28 426	Outer sector north	Akershus	Greater Oslo
Gjerdrum	5 821	5 990	7 457	Outer sector north	Akershus	Greater Oslo
Hurdal	2 617	2 619	3 049	Outer sector north	Akershus	Greater Oslo
Lunner	8 600	8 654	9 438	Outer sector north	Akershus	Greater Oslo
Nannestad	10 927	11 128	16 550	Outer sector north	Akershus	Greater Oslo
Nes	18 827	19 049	24 952	Outer sector north	Akershus	Greater Oslo
Ullensaker	29 088	30 081	45 305	Outer sector north	Akershus	Greater Oslo
Asker	82 562	92 174	100 584	Outer sector west	Akershus	Greater Oslo
Frogn	14 622	14 814	16 351	Outer sector south	Akershus	Greater Oslo
Indre Østfold	40 686	41 108	47 533	Outer sector south	Akershus	Greater Oslo
Marker	3 471	3 476	3 650	Outer sector south	Akershus	Greater Oslo
Skiptvet	3 541	3 576	3 932	Outer sector south	Akershus	Greater Oslo
Vestby	14 373	14 708	19 974	Outer sector south	Akershus	Greater Oslo
Ås	16 386	16 733	22 318	Outer sector south	Akershus	Greater Oslo
Moss	44 323	44 691	52 671	Moss region	Akershus	Greater Oslo
Råde	6 882	6 946	7 873	Moss region	Akershus	Greater Oslo
Våler	4 472	4 573	6 176	Moss region	Akershus	Greater Oslo
Drammen	91 719	92 993	105 558	Drammen region	Akershus	Greater Oslo
Lier	23 267	23 580	28 687	Drammen region	Akershus	Greater Oslo
Øvre Eiker	16 616	16 987	20 880	Drammen region	Akershus	Greater Oslo
Holmestrand	21 432	21 754	27 073	Drammen region	Vestfold	Greater Oslo
Total	1 416 995	1 442 318	1 764 742			Greater Oslo

== Sources ==
of Norway 1. October - Retrieved from Statistics Norway Out of date!

== See also ==
- Metropolitan regions of Norway
- Viken
