= Kausland Church =

Church in Vestland, Norway

- Kausland kyrkje
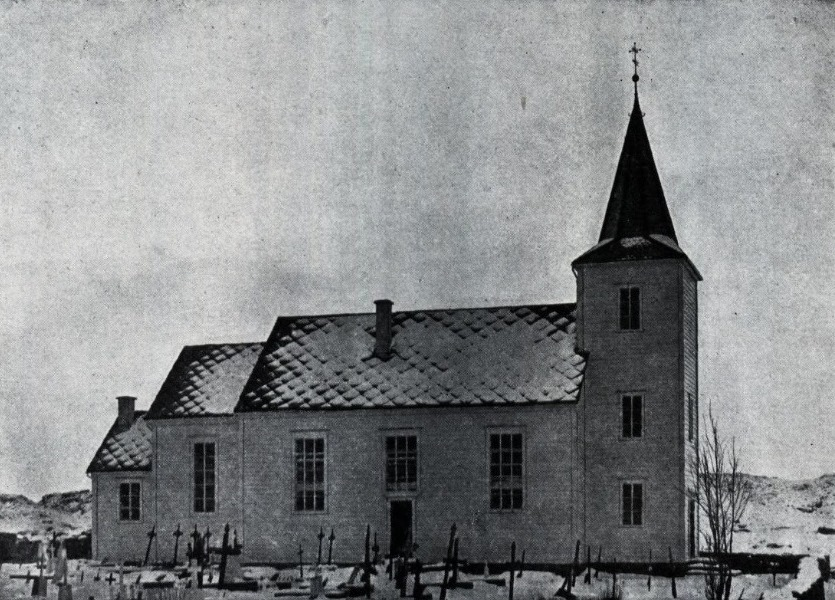
- View of the church (before the 1963 expansion)
- Kausland Church
- 60°13′22″N 5°02′57″E
- Location: Øygarden Municipality, Vestland
- Country: Norway
- Denomination: Church of Norway
- Churchmanship: Evangelical Lutheran

History
- Former name: Kausland kapell
- Status: Parish church
- Founded: 1881
- Consecrated: 24 Aug 1881

Architecture
- Functional status: Active
- Architect: Conrad von der Lippe
- Architectural type: Long church
- Completed: 1881 (145 years ago)

Specifications
- Capacity: 385
- Materials: Wood

Administration
- Diocese: Bjørgvin bispedømme
- Deanery: Vesthordland prosti
- Parish: Sund
- Norwegian Cultural Heritage Site
- Type: Church
- Status: Not protected
- ID: 84767

Kausland Church (Norwegian: Kausland kyrkje) is a parish church of the Church of Norway in Øygarden Municipality in Vestland county, Norway. It is located in the village of Kausland, on the southern part of the island of Sotra. It is one of the two churches in the Sund parish which is part of the Vesthordland prosti (deanery) in the Diocese of Bjørgvin. The white, wooden church was built in a long church design in 1881 using plans drawn up by the architect Conrad Fredrik von der Lippe. The church seats about 385 people.

== History ==
When a new Sund Church was built in the 1870s, the question of building a chapel in Kausland arose. The people of that area had a long journey to get to the church in Sund, so in 1877, the parish agreed to build an annex chapel in Kausland for the western part of the parish. Drawings were prepared by architect Conrad Fredrik von der Lippe and Askild Aase was hired as the lead builder. Construction of the new chapel took place in 1881. The building consisted of a nave and a smaller, narrower chancel on the east end. There was a small sacristy extension on the east end of the chancel. On the west end of the nave was a tower. The steeple on top of the tower dates back to 1674. It originally sat on top of the old Sund Church, which was torn down in 1878 in order to build a new church there. The steeple was saved and moved to Kausland during the construction of this chapel in 1881. The new chapel was consecrated on 24 August 1881. In 1957, the municipal council decided to expand the chapel and upgrade it to the status of a church. The renovation and expansion took place according to plans prepared by architect Ole Halvorsen. The project enlarged the nave by adding a one-story addition surrounding the nave. A sacristy was built on the north and the south side of the original chancel and the old sacristy on the east end was incorporated into the chancel. The remodeling was completed in 1963.

== See also ==
- List of churches in Bjørgvin
