= Tromsø Region =

Region in Troms county, Norway

Coordinates: 69.6519°N 18.9533°E

Tromsø Region is a region in Troms county, Norway. It is centered on the city of Tromsø and consists of two municipalities: Tromsø Municipality (population: 76,974) and Karlsøy Municipality (population: 2,200).

The European route E8 passes through the region, and the Tromsø Airport, Langnes, is also located here. In 2020, Troms county became the newly established Troms og Finnmark county. In 2024, the county merger was undone.
