= Hammarsland =

Village in Øygarden Municipality, Norway

- Village
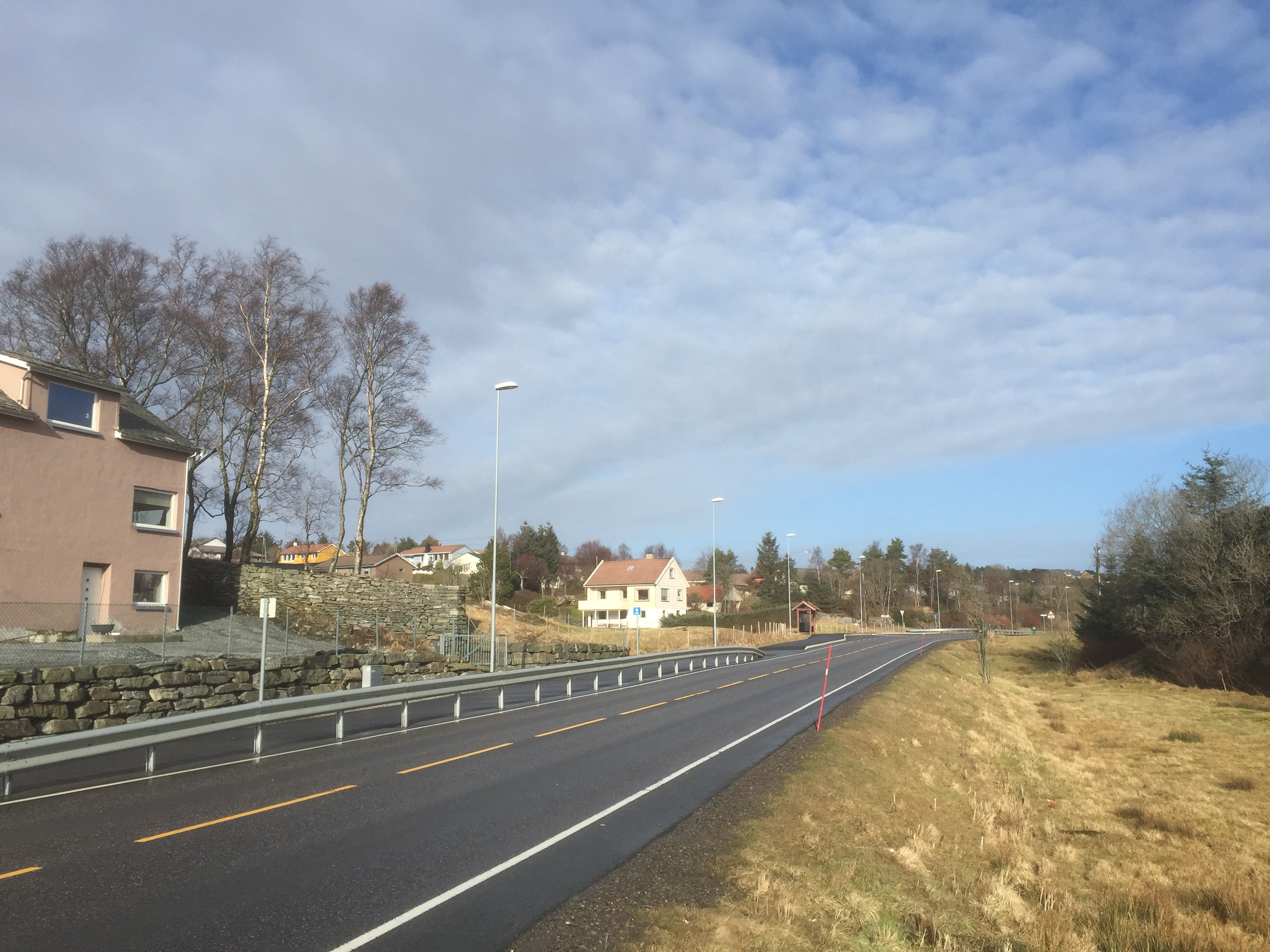
- Interactive map of Hammarsland
- Coordinates: 60.25824°N 5.0683°E
- Country: Norway
- Region: Western Norway
- County: Vestland
- District: Midhordland
- Municipality: Øygarden Municipality

Area
  - Total: 0.67 km^{2} (0.26 sq mi)
- Elevation: 46 m (151 ft)

Population (2025)
  - Total: 1,093
  - Density: 1,631/km^{2} (4,220/sq mi)
- Time zone: UTC+01:00 (CET)
  - Summer (DST): UTC+02:00 (CEST)
- Post Code: 5382 Skogsvåg

Hammarsland (Urban East Norwegian: [ˈhɑ̂mːɑʂlɑn]) is a village in Øygarden Municipality in Vestland county, Norway. The village is located on the island of Sotra, just east of the village of Skogsvåg.

The 0.67-square-kilometre (170-acre) village has a population (2025) of 1,093 and a population density of 1,631 inhabitants per square kilometre (4,220/sq mi).
