= Ole Ueland =

Norwegian politician

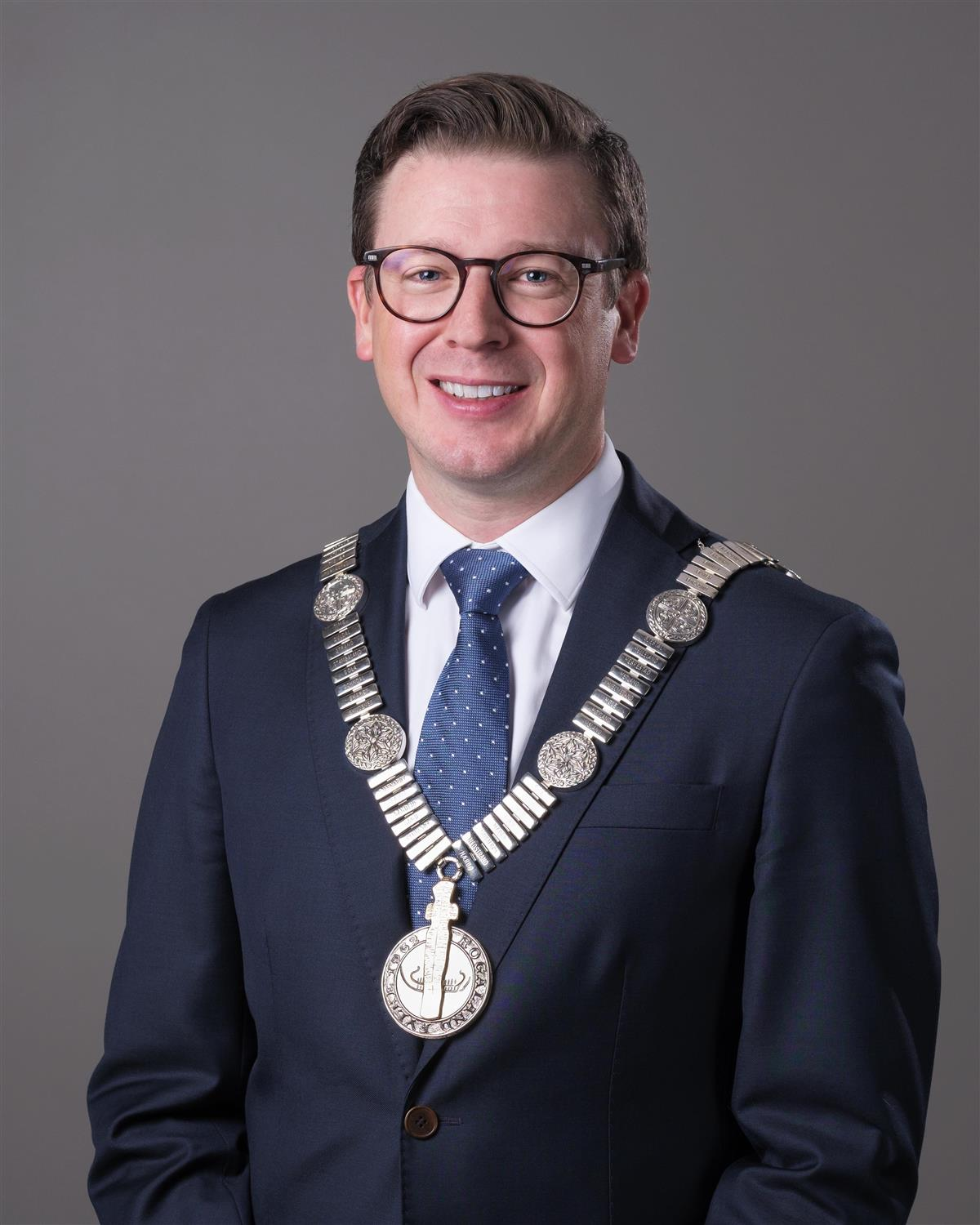

County Mayor of Rogaland
- Incumbent
- Assumed office 24 October 2023
- Deputy: Svein Erik Indbjo
- Preceded by: Marianne Chesak

Mayor of Sola Municipality
- In office 20 October 2011 – 16 October 2019
- Deputy: Jan Sigve Tjelta
- Preceded by: Håkon Rege
- Succeeded by: Tom Henning Slethei

Personal details
- Born: 15 July 1983 (age 43) Stavanger, Rogaland, Norway
- Party: Conservative
- Spouse: Peter André Schwarz
- Children: 2
- Education: Oslo University College

Ole Ueland (born 1983) is a Norwegian politician for the Conservative Party. He has served as the county mayor of Rogaland since 2023. Prior to this, he was mayor of Sola Municipality from 2011 until 2019, and had other positions in his party.

== Political career ==
Ueland joined the Conservative Party when he was 15, and in 1999 he became leader of the Sola chapter of the Norwegian Young Conservatives. From 2001 he was leader of the local chapter of the party. He served as county secretary for the county chapter of the Young Conservatives from 2002 until 2003. Afterwards he worked as a campaign secretary for Rogaland Conservative Party and advisor for the mayor of Stavanger Municipality, Leif Johan Sevland, from 2005 until 2007.

Ueland was elected to the municipal council of Sola Municipality for the first time in 2003, and became member of the formannskap in 2007.

In 2011 he was elected as mayor of Sola Municipality following talks with the Christian Democratic Party and Liberal Party. At 28 years old, he was one of the youngest mayors in the country. He was reelected as mayor in 2015, continuing with the same coalition from his first term.

From 2010 until 2012, he was leader of the county chapter of the Conservative Party.

In 2023, he was elected county mayor of Rogaland following successful talks with the Progress Party, the Liberal Party and the Christian Democratic Party.

== Personal life ==
Ueland has a bachelor's degree in communications from Oslo University College.

He is the grandson of former mayor and member of parliament Ole Gabriel Ueland and nephew of former mayor and predecessor Håkon Rege. He is directly descended from Norwegian liberal pioneer Ole Gabriel Ueland.

He is married to Peter André Schwarz and has two children.
