= Trygve Stangeland =

Trygve Stangeland (13 November 1934 – 18 June 2011) was a Norwegian businessperson.

He was born in Sola Municipality, and founded the construction company Stangeland Gruppen in 1959. The company had a turnover of 1.5 billion kr in 2008, and Stangeland himself has a fortune of NOK 402 million, about US$70 million.

He resided in Tjelta. His son Olav Stangeland is the director of Stangeland Gruppen's daughter company, T. Stangeland Maskin.

On 17 June 2011 he was involved in a bicycle accident near the airport hotel at Stavanger Airport, Sola, and sustained a severe head trauma. The injury claimed his life; he died on Stavanger University Hospital in the afternoon the next day.
