= Fladholmen Lighthouse =

Coastal lighthouse in Sola, Norway

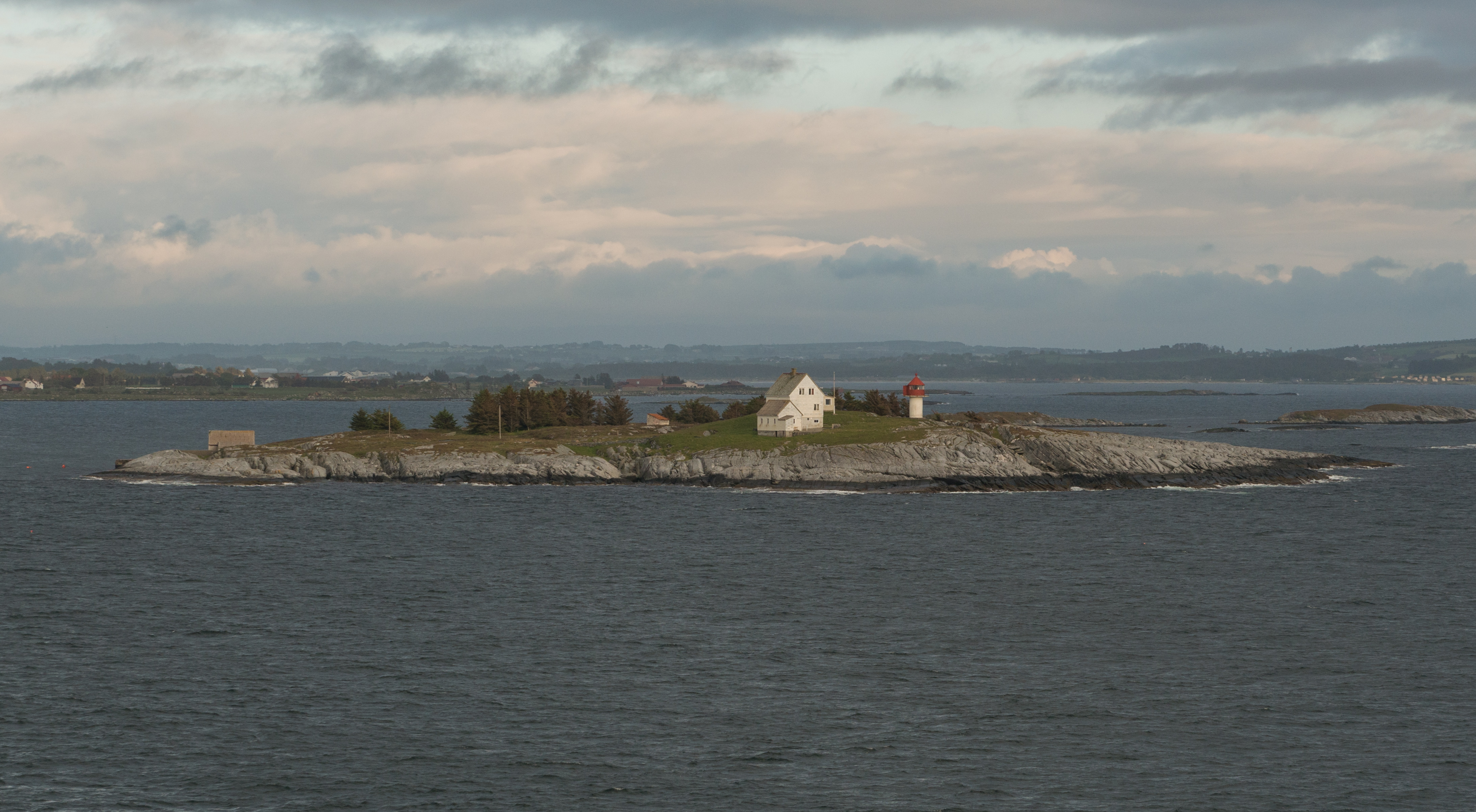
- Flatholmen island, the Lighthouse is located at the right side
- Location: Rogaland, Norway
- Coordinates: 58°55′21″N 05°33′18″E

Tower
- Constructed: 1862
- Construction: Concrete tower
- Automated: 1984
- Height: 8 m (26 ft)
- Shape: Cylindrical tower
- Markings: White with red top
- Operator: Sola Kommune

Light
- First lit: 1957
- Focal height: 17.5 m (57 ft)
- Intensity: 35,100 Candela
- Range: 9 nmi (17 km; 10 mi) (white), 7 nmi (13 km; 8.1 mi) (red), 6 nmi (11 km; 6.9 mi) (green)
- Characteristic: Oc WRG 6s
- Norway no.: 100500

Fladholmen Lighthouse (Norwegian: Fladholmen fyr; unofficial: Flatholmen) is a coastal lighthouse in Sola Municipality in Rogaland county, Norway. The lighthouse is located on a small, flat islet located just west of the village of Tananger. The lighthouse was established in 1862, rebuilt in 1952, and replaced with an electric lamp in 1984.

The 8.2-metre (27 ft) tall, concrete lighthouse is white with a red top. The light sits at an elevation of 17.5 metres (57 ft) above sea level. The occulting light is on for 3 seconds, then off for 3 seconds. The light is white, red or green depending on the direction. The 35,100-candela light can be seen for up to 12.5 nautical miles (23.2 km; 14.4 mi). The station includes at least two 1 1/2-story keeper's houses and several other buildings.

== See also ==
- List of lighthouses in Norway
- Lighthouses in Norway
