= Tananger =

Village in Sola Municipality, Norway

- Village
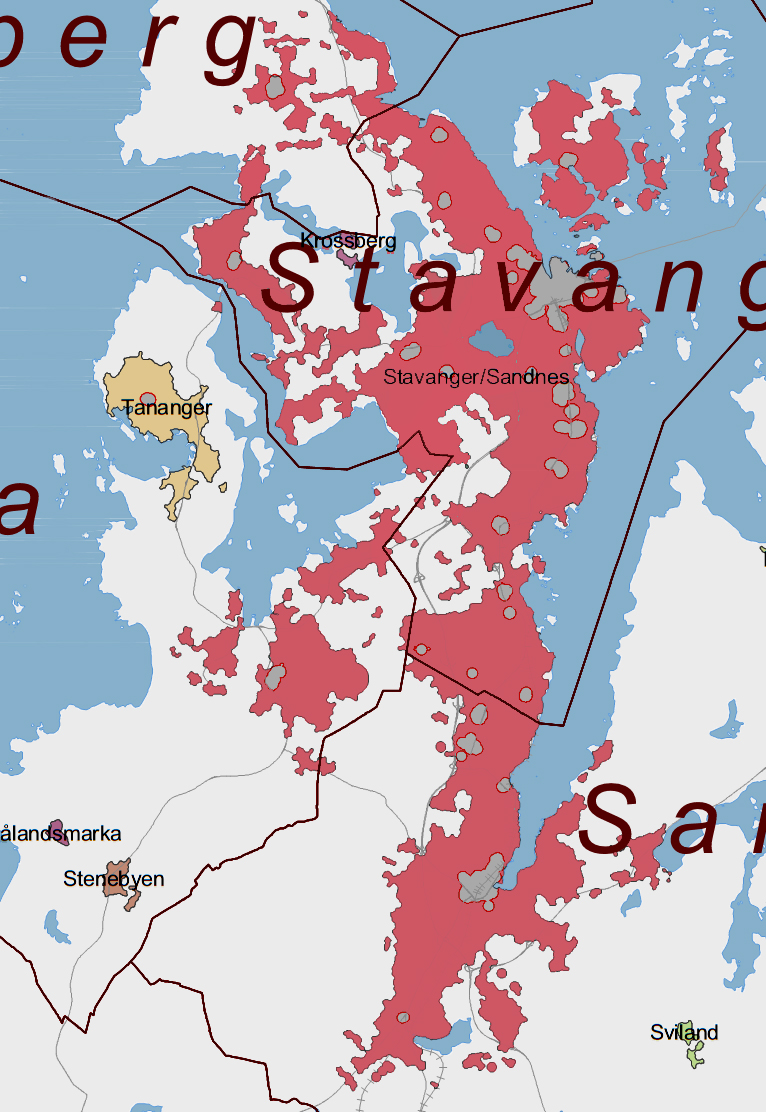
- Map of the Tananger area
- Interactive map of Tananger
- Coordinates: 58.93654°N 5.57577°E
- Country: Norway
- Region: Western Norway
- County: Rogaland
- District: Jæren
- Municipality: Sola Municipality

Area
  - Total: 4.12 km^{2} (1.59 sq mi)
- Elevation: 10 m (33 ft)

Population (2016)
  - Total: 6,528
  - Density: 1,584/km^{2} (4,100/sq mi)
- Time zone: UTC+01:00 (CET)
  - Summer (DST): UTC+02:00 (CEST)
- Post Code: 4056 Tananger

Tananger is a large village and urban area in Sola Municipality in Rogaland county, Norway. The urban area is located on the west side of the Stavanger Peninsula between the North Sea and the Hafrsfjorden. It lies about 10 kilometres (6.2 mi) southwest of the city centre of Stavanger. Tananger Chapel (from 1879) and Tananger Church (from 2002) are both located here.

The 4.12-square-kilometre (1,020-acre) village had a population (2016) of 6,528 and a population density of 1,584 inhabitants per square kilometre (4,100/sq mi). Since 2000, the population and area data for this village area has not been separately tracked by Statistics Norway. Tananger has grown significantly, more than doubling in size from 1980 until 2015. Since 1 January 2017, the urban area of Tananger has been included in the Stavanger/Sandnes urban area, so separate population statistics are no longer tracked.

== History ==
Tananger (mentioned in sources dated to 1608), was used as a safe haven in times of bad weather. It was considered the best and deepest harbour north of Egersund. In 1650, the village was gradually settled, as the local lobster fishing was valued for its worth as an export article. Since then, trading with lobster, fish as well as exclusive articles such as tobacco, coffee, and tea, that came with the bigger ships that sought port in storms, led to the establishment of a customs station under the main customs office in Stavanger in 1777 and it lasted here until 1958. The dangerous rocks in the seas just outside Tananger made the waters so perilous that a Piloting service existed as early as 1679, but was organised in 1720 under national control. Tananger upholds its piloting service to this day, but the customers are mostly supertankers and merchant vessels.

During the Napoleonic Wars, cannon-mounted rowing boats were stationed in Tananger. During World War I, Norwegian Navy vessels were stationed here for neutrality-watch.

In 1965, the oil adventure started with Aker-Norsco establishing in Tananger as one of the first supply bases to the offshore activities.

== Economy ==
Several oil companies are located here including Royal Dutch Shell and ConocoPhillips. Apart from the oil companies, some of the major oil service companies Schlumberger, Halliburton, and Baker Hughes are located in the Risavika harbour area. Risavika harbour has been expanded using infill to enlarge its capacity. There are international ferries to Denmark that leave from Tananger. Also located in Risavika harbour is an NGL plant run by electricity company Lyse Energi.
