= Sola Chapel =

Church in Rogaland, Norway

- Sola kapell
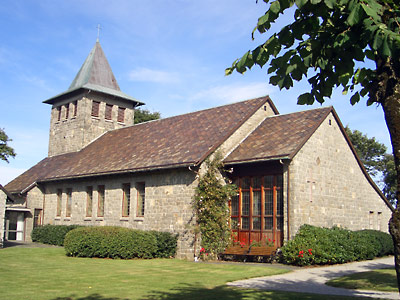
- View of the church
- Sola Chapel
- 58.89013°N 5.61904°E
- Location: Sola Municipality, Rogaland
- Country: Norway
- Denomination: Church of Norway
- Churchmanship: Evangelical Lutheran

History
- Former name: Sola kirke
- Status: Parish church
- Founded: c. 1140
- Consecrated: 1955

Architecture
- Functional status: Active
- Architect: Gustav Helland
- Architectural type: Long church
- Completed: 1955

Specifications
- Capacity: 300
- Materials: Stone

Administration
- Diocese: Stavanger bispedømme
- Deanery: Tungenes prosti
- Parish: Sola
- Norwegian Cultural Heritage Site
- Type: Church
- Status: Not protected
- ID: 85511

Sola Chapel (Norwegian: Sola kapell; historically: Sola Church) is a parish church of the Church of Norway in Sola Municipality in Rogaland county, Norway. It is located in the village of Solakrossen. It formerly was the main church for the Sola parish which is part of the Tungenes prosti (deanery) in the Diocese of Stavanger. The stone church was built in a long church design in 1955 using designs by the architect Gustav Helland. The church seats about 300 people.

== History ==
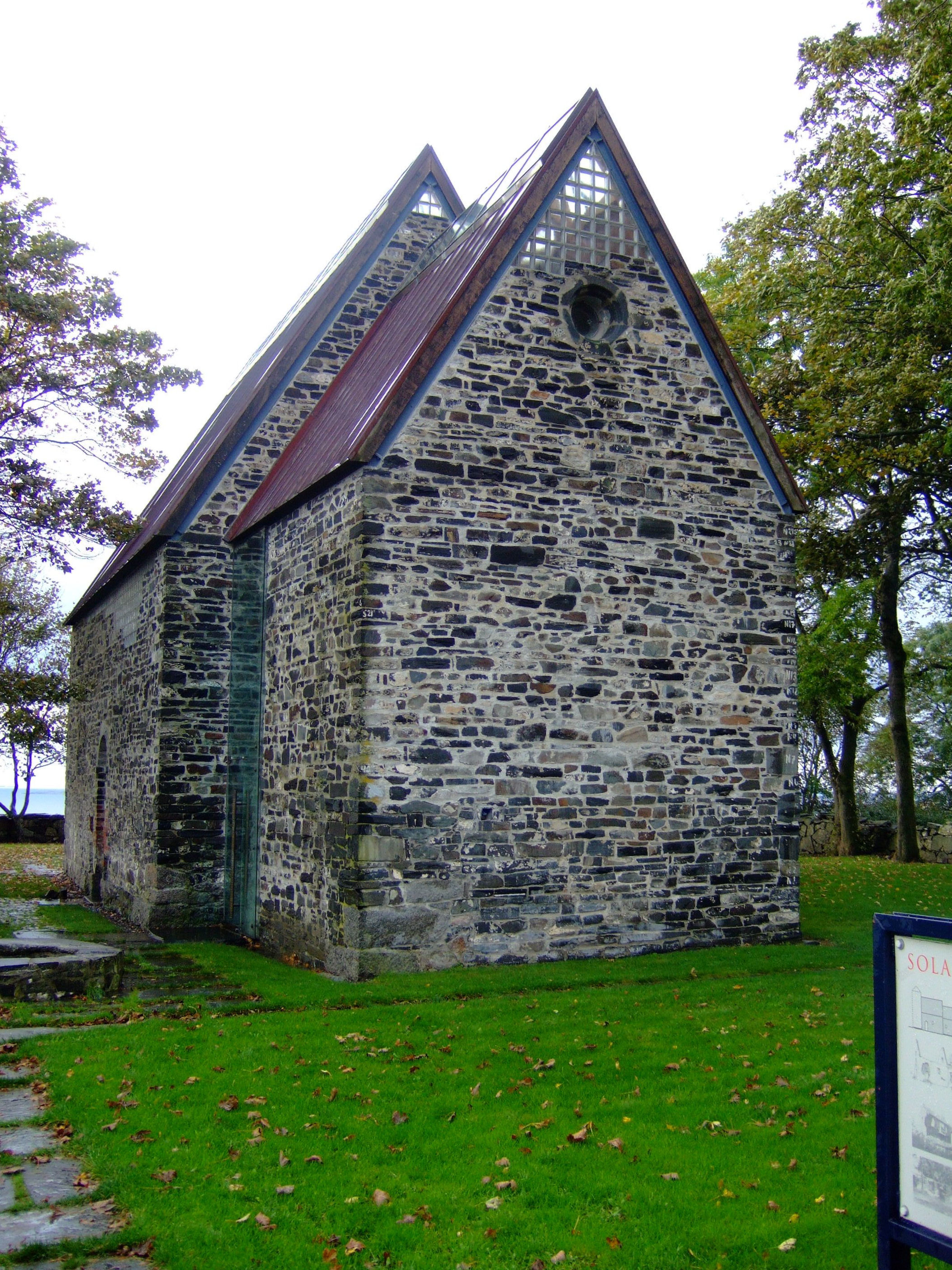
View of the rebuilt medieval church

The earliest existing historical records of the church in Sola date back to the year 1273, but it was built around the year 1140. The old stone church had a rectangular nave and a smaller rectangular chancel. There was a tower on the west end.

In 1814, this church served as an election church (Norwegian: valgkirke). Together with more than 300 other parish churches across Norway, it was a polling station for elections to the 1814 Norwegian Constituent Assembly which wrote the Constitution of Norway. This was Norway's first national elections. Each church parish was a constituency that elected people called "electors" who later met together in each county to elect the representatives for the assembly that was to meet at Eidsvoll Manor later that year.

The church served Sola for centuries until 1840 when it was closed. The building stood vacant for 40 years and began to fall apart. In 1880, the building was purchased and turned into a private home. In 1940, the building was partially demolished and then its ruins sat for decades.

In 1955, a new Sola Church was constructed about 500 metres (1,600 ft) to the east. In 1991, the old church ruins were rebuilt in a historical, but modern design using skylights. The old church was rededicated in 1995.

The congregation used the "new" church for nearly 30 years and it grew significantly since this church was built. In 2015, the parish council approved a plan to build a new Sola Church in the village of Solakrossen. The new Sola Church was completed in 2020. After the new church was put into use, the name of this church was changed from Sola Church to Sola Chapel.

== See also ==
- List of churches in Rogaland
