= Stangeland Gruppen =

Norwegian construction company

- Industry: Construction
- Headquarters: Sola, Norway
- Key people: Trygve Stangeland (founder); Olav Stangeland
- Revenue: 1.5 billion kr (2008)
- Number of employees: 630
- Subsidiaries: T. Stangeland Maskin; Stangeland Kran; TS Eiendom
- Website: www.stangelandgruppen.no

Stangeland Gruppen is a construction company based in Norway.

It is the parent company of T. Stangeland Maskin, Stangeland Kran, and TS Eiendom.

== History ==
It was founded by Trygve Stangeland in 1959.

It had a turnover of 1.5 billion kr in 2008, and has about 600 employees, most of them in T. Stangeland Maskin.
