= Hålandsmarka =

Village in Sola Municipality, Norway

- Village
- Interactive map of Hålandsmarka
- Coordinates: 58.8512°N 5.5764°E
- Country: Norway
- Region: Western Norway
- County: Rogaland
- District: Jæren
- Municipality: Sola Municipality

Area
  - Total: 0.17 km^{2} (0.066 sq mi)
- Elevation: 63 m (207 ft)

Population (2025)
  - Total: 889
  - Density: 5,229/km^{2} (13,540/sq mi)
- Time zone: UTC+01:00 (CET)
  - Summer (DST): UTC+02:00 (CEST)
- Post Code: 4053 Ræge

Hålandsmarka is a village in Sola Municipality in Rogaland county, Norway. The village is located in the southwestern part of the municipality, about 1 kilometre (0.62 mi) west of the village of Stenebyen. Hålandsmarka is known for a great seaside view of most of the Rogaland coastline, on good days you will be able to see areas as far as 70 kilometres (43 mi) away.

The 0.17-square-kilometre (42-acre) village has a population (2025) of 889 and a population density of 5,229 inhabitants per square kilometre (13,540/sq mi).

Currently, Hålandsmarka is entirely a residential village, with no commercial or industrial areas. Most inhabitants work in the nearby village of Solakrossen and the Stavanger Airport since they are located a short distance to the north.
