= Ræge Church =

Church in Rogaland, Norway

- Ræge kirke
- Ræge Church
- 58.85432°N 5.608317°E
- Location: Sola Municipality, Rogaland
- Country: Norway
- Denomination: Church of Norway
- Churchmanship: Evangelical Lutheran

History
- Former name: Ræge kapell
- Status: Parish church
- Founded: 1940
- Consecrated: 2009

Architecture
- Functional status: Active
- Architect: Henriette Sagland
- Architectural type: Rectangular
- Completed: 2009

Specifications
- Capacity: 300
- Materials: Concrete

Administration
- Diocese: Stavanger bispedømme
- Deanery: Tungenes prosti
- Parish: Ræge

Ræge Church (Norwegian Bokmål: Ræge kirke, Nynorsk: Ræge kyrkje) is a parish church of the Church of Norway in Sola Municipality in Rogaland county, Norway. It is located just north of the village of Stenebyen. It is the church for the Ræge parish which is part of the Tungenes prosti (deanery) in the Diocese of Stavanger. The white, concrete, modern church was built in a rectangular design in 2009 using designs by the architect Henriette Sagland from the architectural firm Link Signatur. The church seats about 300 people.

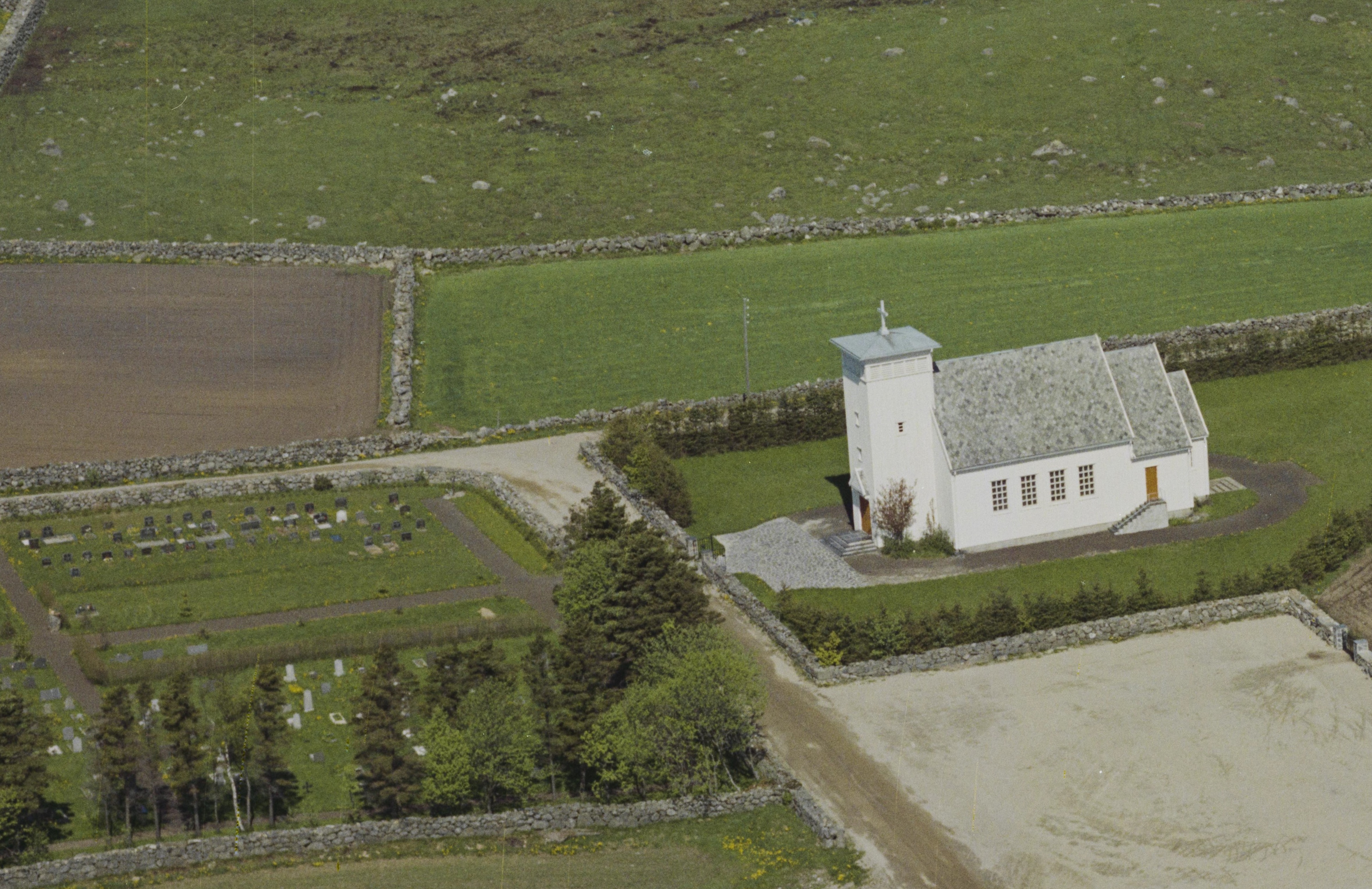
View of the old chapel

== History ==
In 1940, a small chapel was built at Ræge. It had seating for about 170 people. In 2009, a new, larger church was built a short distance to the south of the chapel. After the new church was completed in September 2019, the old chapel was closed and then in April 2010, the old chapel was torn down.

== See also ==
- List of churches in Rogaland
