= Risavika =

Harbour in Sola, Norway

- Risaviga (historic)
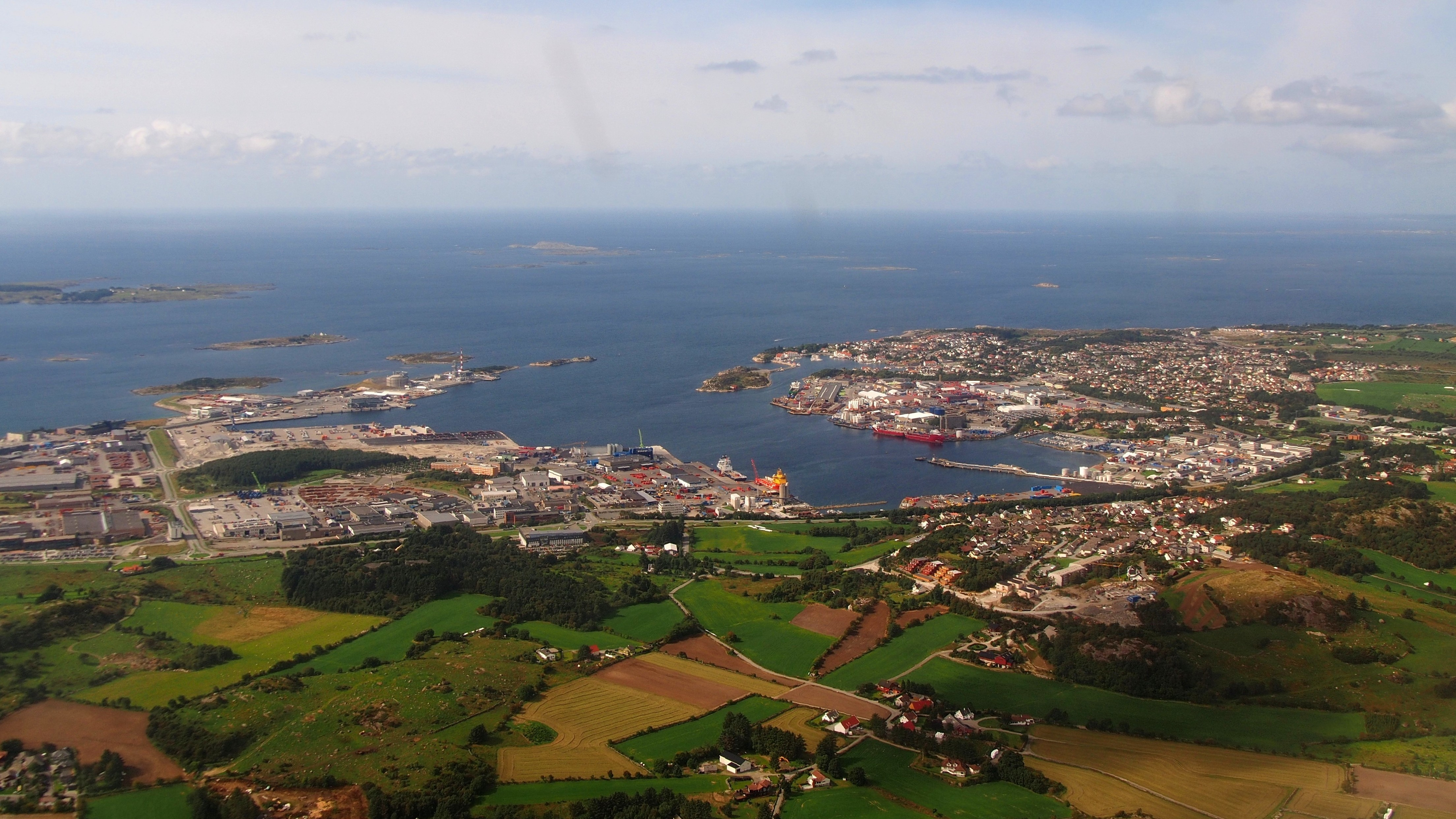
- Aerial view of Risavika harbour taken in 2013
- Interactive map of the fjord
- Location: Rogaland county, Norway
- Coordinates: 58.92701°N 5.59221°E
- Type: Harbour
- Basin countries: Norway
- Settlements: Tananger

Risavika is a small bay and harbour in Tananger along the western coast of Sola Municipality in Rogaland county, Norway. Risavika harbour is an important transportation hub for the nearby city of Stavanger, as well as port facility for shipping and the Norwegian oil industry.

== History ==
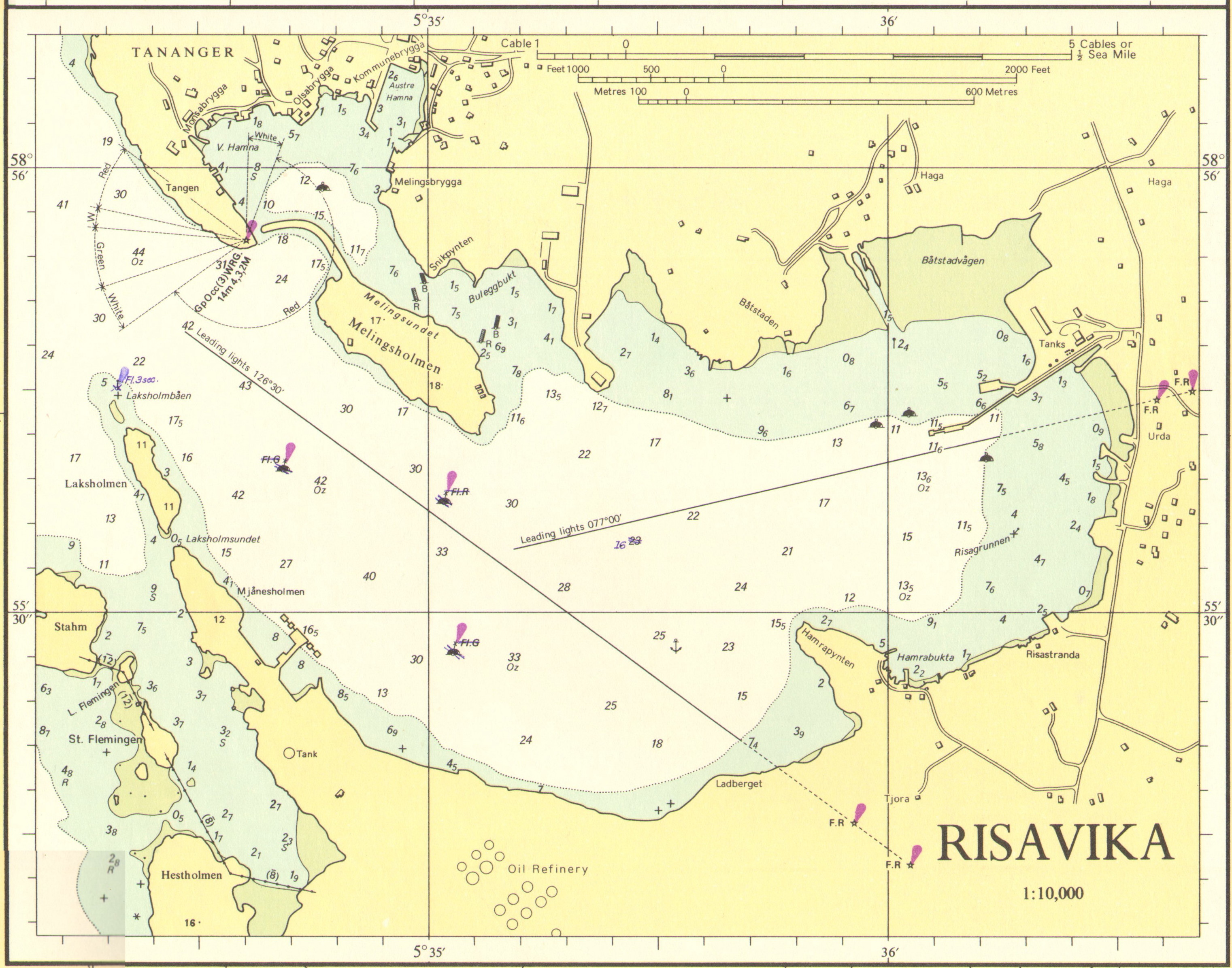
Nautical chart of the Risavika area

The history of Risavika as a commercial harbour began in 1960 when Shell opened an oil refinery in the area, which operated until 2000.

In 2011, a large liquefied natural gas (LNG) export terminal was opened in Risavika, and in 2021 was acquired by North Sea Midstream Partners limited from Gasum.

On 31 August 2024 Hvaldimir the beluga whale was found dead near Risavika.

=== Transport ===
The Fjord Line uses Risavika as the harbour to serve Stavanger for routes to Bergen, Kristiansand, and Hirtshals, Denmark.
