= Sørnes Church =

Church in Rogaland, Norway

- Sørnes kirke
- Sørnes Church
- 58.912395°N 5.67717°E
- Location: Sola Municipality, Rogaland
- Country: Norway
- Denomination: Church of Norway
- Churchmanship: Evangelical Lutheran

History
- Status: Parish church
- Founded: 1977
- Consecrated: 1977

Architecture
- Functional status: Active
- Architect: Tor Sørensen
- Architectural type: Cruciform
- Completed: 1977

Specifications
- Capacity: 240
- Materials: Brick

Administration
- Diocese: Stavanger bispedømme
- Deanery: Tungenes prosti
- Parish: Sørnes
- Norwegian Cultural Heritage Site
- Type: Church
- Status: Not protected
- ID: 85056

Sørnes Church (Norwegian: Sørnes kirke) is a parish church of the Church of Norway in Sola Municipality in Rogaland county, Norway. It is located in the village of Sørnes. It is the church for the Sørnes parish which is part of the Tungenes prosti (deanery) in the Diocese of Stavanger. The large, brick church was built in a cruciform design in 1977 using designs by the architect Tor Sørensen. The church seats about 240 people, but it has movable walls which can enlarge the sanctuary to seat about 500 people.

== See also ==
- List of churches in Rogaland
