= Solakrossen =

Village in Sola Municipality, Norway

Sola Solakrossen
- Village
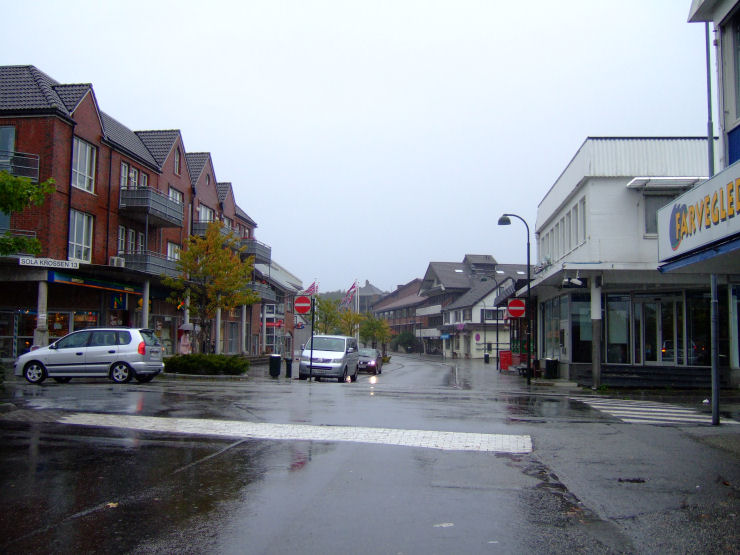
- View of the village (looking northwards)
- Interactive map of Sola; Solakrossen
- Coordinates: 58.88854°N 5.65289°E
- Country: Norway
- Region: Western Norway
- County: Rogaland
- District: Jæren
- Municipality: Sola Municipality
- Elevation: 10 m (33 ft)
- Time zone: UTC+01:00 (CET)
  - Summer (DST): UTC+02:00 (CEST)
- Post Code: 4050 Sola

Solakrossen or Sola is the administrative center of Sola Municipality in Rogaland county, Norway. The village is located at the south end of the Hafrsfjord on the Stavanger Peninsula, just northwest of the city of Sandnes. The large Stavanger Airport, Sola is located on the west side of the village. The village of Sørnes lies just to the north. Sola Church lies on the far western edge of Solakrossen.

The population of Solakrossen is about 10,000, but the population is not separately tracked since it is part of the Stavanger/Sandnes urban area. The newspaper Solabladet has been published in Solakrossen since 1991. It is published in a paper edition on Thursdays and online every day.

== Climate ==
Climate data for Stavanger Airport, Sola 1991-2020 normals (7 m, extremes 1947–present, sunshine 1961-1990)
Month	Jan	Feb	Mar	Apr	May	Jun	Jul	Aug	Sep	Oct	Nov	Dec	Year
Record high °C (°F)	12.4 (54.3)	13.9 (57.0)	17.7 (63.9)	25.2 (77.4)	29.4 (84.9)	30.5 (86.9)	32.5 (90.5)	33.5 (92.3)	29.3 (84.7)	22.3 (72.1)	16.2 (61.2)	12 (54)	33.5 (92.3)
Mean daily maximum °C (°F)	4.8 (40.6)	4.6 (40.3)	6.5 (43.7)	10.4 (50.7)	13.8 (56.8)	16.3 (61.3)	18.6 (65.5)	19 (66)	16.1 (61.0)	11.9 (53.4)	8 (46)	5.6 (42.1)	11.3 (52.3)
Daily mean °C (°F)	2.6 (36.7)	2.1 (35.8)	3.7 (38.7)	6.9 (44.4)	10.2 (50.4)	13 (55)	15.3 (59.5)	15.7 (60.3)	13.2 (55.8)	9.2 (48.6)	5.7 (42.3)	3.4 (38.1)	8.4 (47.1)
Mean daily minimum °C (°F)	0 (32)	−0.4 (31.3)	0.9 (33.6)	3.6 (38.5)	6.8 (44.2)	9.9 (49.8)	12.4 (54.3)	12.7 (54.9)	10.3 (50.5)	6.4 (43.5)	3 (37)	0.6 (33.1)	5.5 (41.9)
Record low °C (°F)	−19.8 (−3.6)	−19.2 (−2.6)	−16.2 (2.8)	−7.9 (17.8)	−2.5 (27.5)	0.6 (33.1)	4.3 (39.7)	1.2 (34.2)	−2.5 (27.5)	−5.2 (22.6)	−16.1 (3.0)	−16.1 (3.0)	−19.8 (−3.6)
Average precipitation mm (inches)	118.5 (4.67)	99.6 (3.92)	80.5 (3.17)	62.5 (2.46)	62.1 (2.44)	67.3 (2.65)	91.2 (3.59)	126.5 (4.98)	132 (5.2)	148.3 (5.84)	135.2 (5.32)	132.4 (5.21)	1,256.1 (49.45)
Average precipitation days (≥ 1.0 mm)	16	14	13	11	10	10	12	14	15	17	16	17	165
Average relative humidity (%)	82	81	78	77	75	78	78	80	80	81	82	82	80
Mean monthly sunshine hours	48	79	140	168	226	222	197	159	141	80	45	33	1,538
Source 1: yr.no/met.no
Source 2: NOAA - WMO averages 91-2020 Norway
