= Tananger Chapel =

Church in Rogaland, Norway

- Tananger kapell
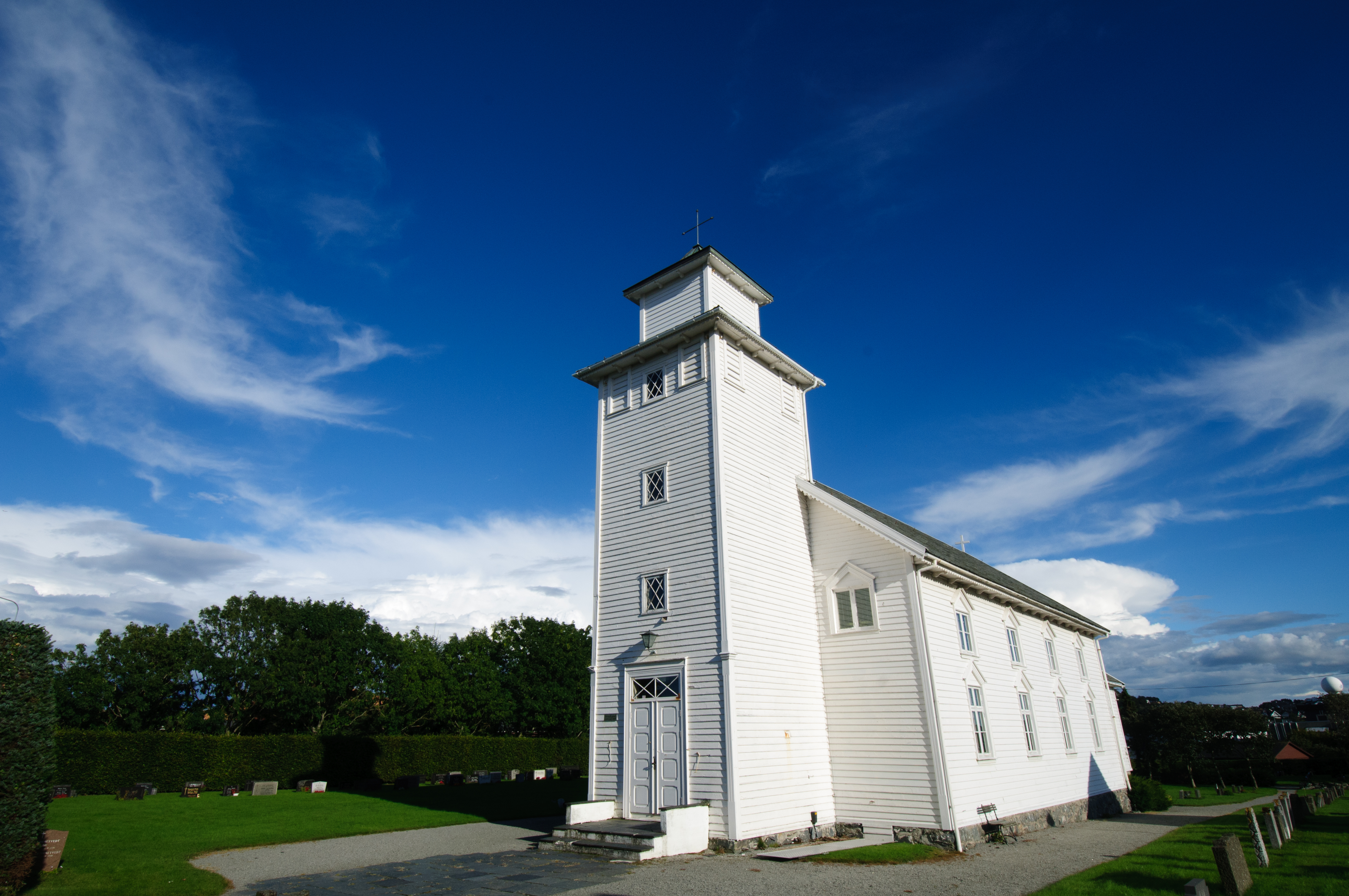
- View of the church
- Tananger Chapel
- 58.935175°N 5.60097°E
- Location: Sola Municipality, Rogaland
- Country: Norway
- Denomination: Church of Norway
- Churchmanship: Evangelical Lutheran

History
- Former name: Tananger kirke
- Status: Parish church
- Founded: 1879
- Consecrated: 1879

Architecture
- Functional status: Historic
- Architect(s): Hans Linstow and Henrik Nissen
- Architectural type: Long church
- Completed: 1879

Specifications
- Capacity: 250
- Materials: Wood

Administration
- Diocese: Stavanger bispedømme
- Deanery: Tungenes prosti
- Parish: Tananger
- Norwegian Cultural Heritage Site
- Type: Church
- Status: Protected
- ID: 85072

Tananger Chapel (Norwegian: Tananger kapell; historically called Tananger Church) is a historic parish church of the Church of Norway in Sola Municipality in Rogaland county, Norway. It is located in the village of Tananger. It used to be the church for the Tananger parish which is part of the Tungenes prosti (deanery) in the Diocese of Stavanger. The white, wooden church was built in a long church design in 1879 using designs by the architect Henrik Nissen, who adapted plans made by Hans Linstow. The church seats about 250 people.

The church was in use from 1879 until 2002 when the new Tananger Church was completed about 100 metres (330 ft) east of the old church. Now, the old church (now called "chapel") is used only for very special events and it can be rented for weddings.

== See also ==
- List of churches in Rogaland
