= Hvaldimir =

Beluga whale (c. 2009 – 2024)

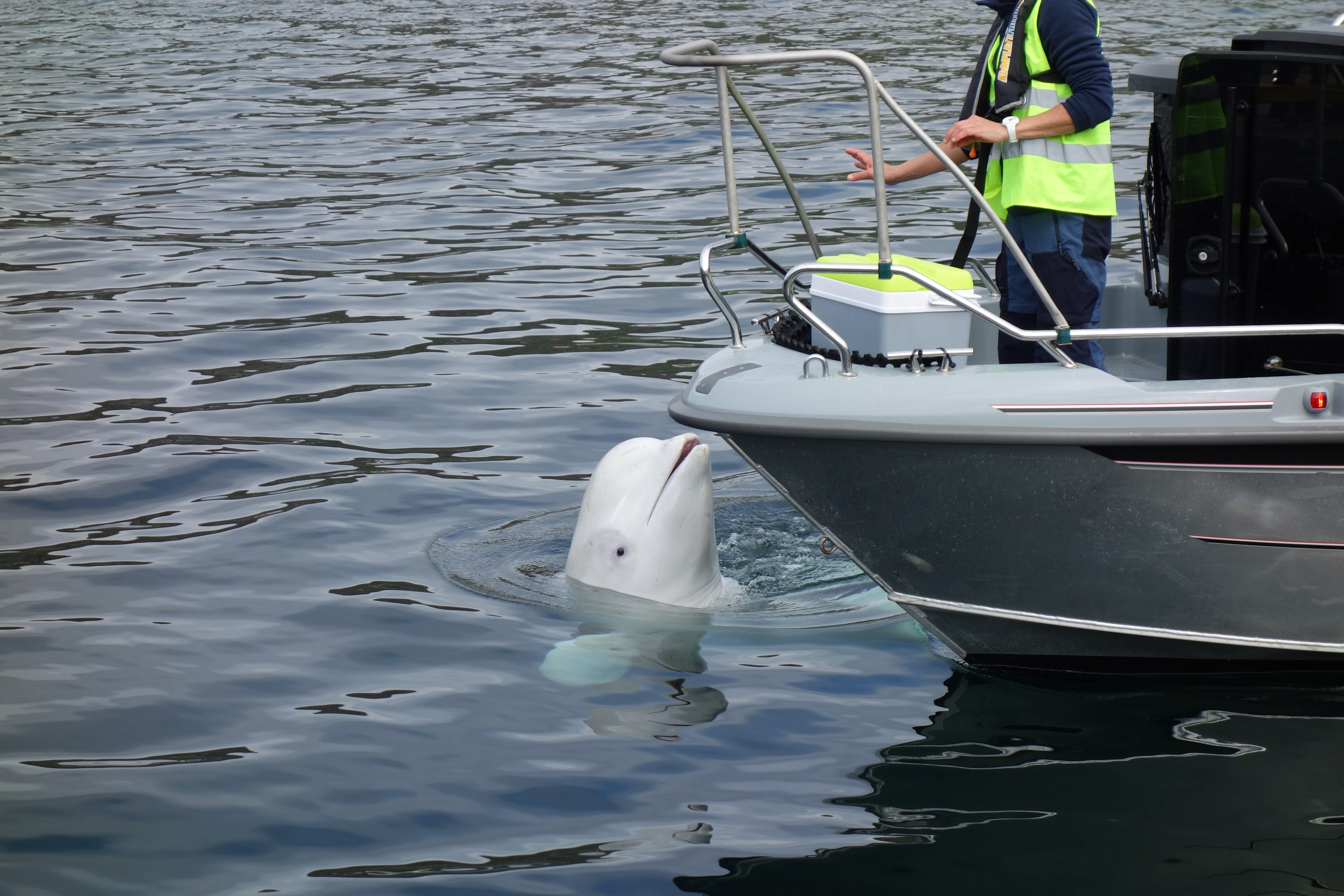
- Hvaldimir spyhopping to inspect a boat at Hammerfest Harbour
- Species: Beluga whale
- Sex: Male
- Born: c. 2009
- Died: 31 August 2024 (aged 14–15); Risavika, Rogaland, Norway
- Cause of death: Bacterial infection (suspected)
- Known for: Suspected Russian spy
- Named after: Vladimir Putin

Hvaldimir (Norwegian pronunciation: [ˈʋɑːl.dɪ.mɪr]; c. 2009 – 31 August 2024) was a male beluga whale that fishermen near Hammerfest in northern Norway noticed in April 2019 wearing a camera harness. After being freed from the harness, he remained in the area and appeared used to humans. Speculation that he had been trained by Russia as a spy whale led to him being dubbed Hvaldimir, a portmanteau of Norwegian hval (whale) and "Vladimir", for Russian President Vladimir Putin. By 2023, Hvaldimir's range appeared to have expanded to include areas of the south-western coastline of Sweden. On 31 August 2024, Hvaldimir was found dead in the bay of Risavika, close to Stavanger in Norway. Activist groups claimed he died from gunfire, but the following necropsy confirmed that was not the case.

According to Ukrainian marine researcher Olga Shpak, the whale was named Andruha and was captured in the Sea of Okhotsk in 2013. The whale spent a year in St. Petersburg and then was moved to a Russian military naval base in Murmansk, where he eventually escaped.

== Appearances and reactions ==
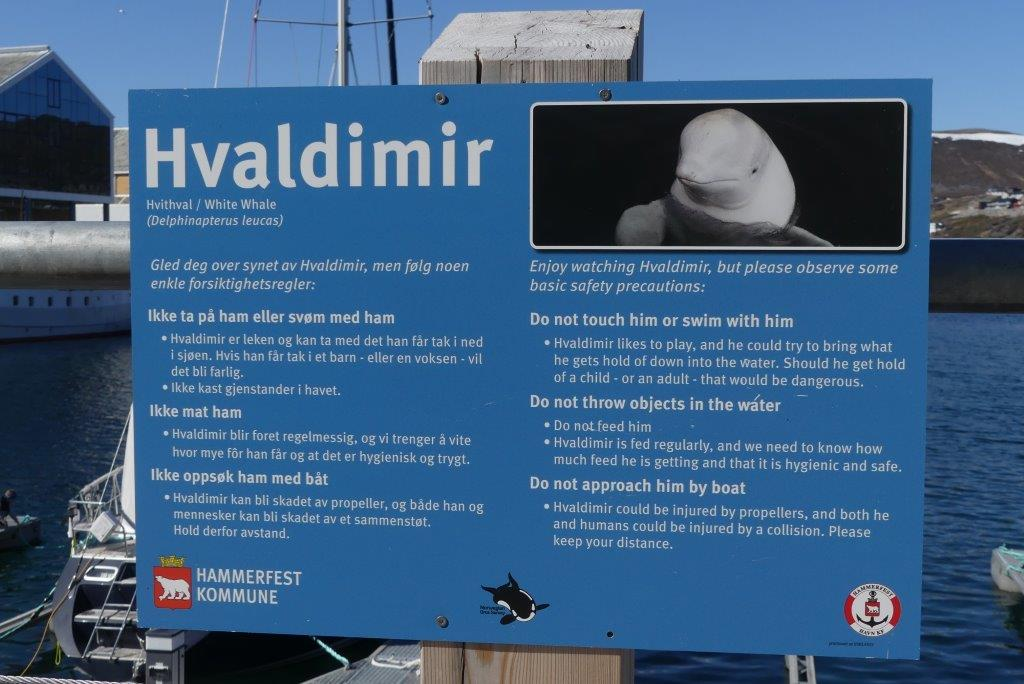
Sign at Hammerfest Harbour in Norwegian and English warning against interfering with Hvaldimir

The whale appeared beginning on 26 April 2019 north of Hammerfest, off the island of Ingøya and near the village of Tufjord on the island of Rolvsøya, wearing a tight-fitting camera harness labelled "Equipment St. Petersburg", and rubbing against boats in apparent attempts to free himself. Animal rescue staff and fishers worked to free him from the harness. A fisherman named Joar Hesten finally put on a survival suit and jumped over the side of the boat to loosen the harness buckles. The whale continued to return to the boats for several days, asking for food and playing fetch, and showed himself to be very tame, coming when called and liking to be scratched around the blowhole. He later followed a boat to Hammerfest harbour.

The Norwegian Directorate of Fisheries and the police urged the public not to feed the whale and to leave him alone to avoid stressing him. There was concern he might become aggressive or might become too dependent on humans, like Keiko the orca. A proposal was made to place the whale in a sanctuary in Iceland which already houses two belugas from China, but since he seemed to be making efforts to find his own food, the Directorate of Fisheries decided in mid-May not to relocate him. The Norwegian Institute of Marine Research recommended returning him to a facility in Russia if he did not become self-sustaining. However, it became apparent a few days later that the whale was malnourished, and with Hammerfest Municipality taking responsibility, the Directorate of Fisheries agreed that he should be fed. The Norwegian Orca Survey began doing so, although there was hope that the feeding could eventually end. The public donated funds to feed him. He was later reported to have been seriously ill, and to have been hooked by an angler and injured. Norwegian Orca Survey's two main staff at the time included a former employee of Marineland and a career whale trainer from SeaWorld and Marineland. The trainers found that the whale responded to hand gestures, demonstrating that he had received prior training. The trainers began to utilise Hvaldimir's trained behaviours to perform daily "feeding shows" in Hammerfest Harbour to cruise boat passengers. The trainers taught Hvaldimir to lie alongside a boat so that he could be medically treated if necessary, although Norway never permitted any veterinary care of Hvaldimir.

After attracting crowds of observers, the whale left Hammerfest harbour in July and apparently had learned to find food; he was observed several times in August near Seiland, an island located between Hammerfest and Alta. He then appeared in early September in the harbour at Alta, where he showed signs of injury from propellers and people were observed throwing things at him and pushing things into his mouth.

=== Protection efforts ===
Shortly after Hvaldimir appeared in May 2019, the Norwegian Orca Survey assembled a team to monitor him. Because the whale's harness suggested he had come from a captive situation, concerns were raised about his ability to both feed himself and survive. Despite an initial health scare, Hvaldimir's body condition improved as the Norwegian Orca Survey group regularly provided food for him while stressing to the public not to feed or interact with him.

Hvaldimir left Hammerfest in late July, causing worry. He was observed traveling along the Norwegian coast, where continued study indicated he had been successfully feeding himself. He was able to survive on his own.

Activist Regina Crosby first encountered Hvaldimir in July 2019. Crosby's initial advocacy for Hvaldimir through the informal group 'Friends of Hvaldimir' led to the establishment of what would become the nonprofit OneWhale in 2020. Several prominent cetacean scientists joined as advisors; the group's foremost concern was how best to give Hvaldimir a future as a wild whale. However, as Hvaldimir's international fame continued to increase, an increasing number of tourists would visit his location to see him. While most admired Hvaldimir from afar, some caused him harm through reckless interactions. His frequent presence near various industrial salmon farms also sparked concerns.

In the summer of 2021, OneWhale formed "Team Hvaldimir" in an effort to attempt to mitigate the challenges and tourism around the whale. Team Hvaldimir was a group of trained scientists and volunteers who lived on-site around the whale at all times. In the fall of 2021, OneWhale partnered with NOAH, the largest animal rights organisation in Norway. OneWhale was also working closely with the city of Hammerfest to dedicate a fjord as a protected marine reserve for Hvaldimir: this effort was known as the Norwegian Whale Reserve, though little in the way of updates have been provided.

In May 2023, Hvaldimir left his usual areas and traveled briefly to Oslo, Norway, before continuing into Swedish waters. Due to the higher human population and lower availability of food for him, worries for his safety sharply increased. Within several months, he had once again returned to Norwegian waters.

The majority of OneWhale resigned in the summer of 2023 due to "intense disagreement" over Hvaldimir's future. A former member – Sebastian Strand – subsequently founded the Norwegian non-profit Marine Mind, which took up monitoring Hvaldimir in Rogaland. Marine Mind's focus was on educating the public about Hvaldimir while promoting marine stewardship.

=== Hvaldimir's life ===
The Norwegian Directorate of Fisheries and the Norwegian Food Safety Authority repeatedly issued conflicting statements about Hvaldimir's welfare, at times claiming he had become a "wild" whale. In January 2023, Hvaldimir was still living full-time in and around fisheries off the coast of Norway, where he frequently would be seen interacting with workers, fishermen, locals, and tourists. By the early spring of 2023, no Norwegian agency or branch within the government had yet provided any protection, welfare plan or care for Hvaldimir; much of his earlier feeding, health care and human interactions had come from several international whale activism groups, whose volunteer presence had been approved by the Norwegian authorities.

In May 2023, Hvaldimir was located near Hunnebostrand, in south-western Sweden, having travelled along the Scandinavian coastline at a faster speed than previously observed. While the reasons for this movement are not entirely clear, marine biologist Sebastian Strand speculated that the whale might have been seeking the company of others of his species, to socialise, or to find a mate.

In early June 2023, Hvaldimir appeared in a highly populated area, in a river near midtown Gothenburg, Sweden. In mid-June, he followed a boat to the river Glomma.

In late June, Hvaldimir showed up in Strömstad and in Kungshamn, two towns not far from the Norwegian border.

On 10 July 2023, it was reported that the Hammerfest town council had actually voted 28–32 in favour of setting up a private fjord sanctuary away from the busy harbour, but still within the region of Finnmark, away from maritime traffic and potentially dangerous tourists. OneWhale, one of the organisations involved in Hvaldimir's care and observations, stated that other captive and human-conditioned beluga whales from around the world could be rescued and potentially joined with Hvaldimir, with the whales possibly being released further north to the waters off Svalbard, where a group of wild belugas is known to exist.

=== Interactions with people ===
On 4 May 2019, after a day in Hammerfest, two friends went to the docks to look for the whale; 25-year-old Ina Mansika's phone fell out of her pocket into the water and the whale brought it back to her. A video posted on Instagram shows her then scratching him under the chin.

In June 2019, he pulled a diver's knife from its scabbard, and played with an underwater drone that was being tested. On 9 September, he was filmed taking a kayaker's GoPro camera, then retrieving it from the harbour floor to return it to its owner, while earlier that month he was observed playing with a wild herring gull, teasing it into dropping fish it had caught.

In November 2019, a video appeared online of a beluga playing fetch with a rugby ball off the Norwegian coast; this was confirmed to be Hvaldimir.

=== Death ===
Hvaldimir was found floating dead in the bay of Risavika, close to Stavanger, on 31 August 2024. The animal rights organizations NOAH and OneWhale subsequently filed a police complaint stating that Hvaldimir died after sustaining multiple gunshot wounds. A director from a third whale activist organization, Marine Mind, however said there was nothing to immediately reveal the cause of death and despite seeing the markings, believed it was just "too early to say what they are" and that some of the markings may have possibly been caused by marine birds.

A later necropsy found no projectiles or other signs of human interference in the cadaver. Police reported that a stick had become lodged in Hvaldimir's mouth, and most of his organs had broken down, later adding that the cause of death was most likely a bacterial infection from mouth injuries caused by the stick.

== Theories and naming ==
When the harness, which had a GoPro camera mount but no camera, was removed, the buckle clip had a drawing of a carved fish hook, encircled by the words "Equipment St Petersburg" (written in English). This harness and camera mount led to suspicion that the whale had been trained for use in Russian espionage. Both the United States and Russia are known to have military cetacean training programs, with Russian programs incorporating beluga whales. A Russian marine scientist told a Norwegian colleague that the harness was not of a type used by Russian scientists. A Russian military spokesman, Colonel Viktor Baranets, said in response: "If we were using this animal for spying do you think we would attach a mobile phone number with the message 'please call this number'?", but did not deny that the whale might have escaped from the Russian Navy; the Russian naval base at Murmansk is not far from Hammerfest. The Norwegian Police Security Service was investigating as of May 2019. A Russian naval analyst, Mikhail Barabanov, said he thought the whale was part of a zoological tracking project.

In late May 2019 satellite photos surfaced reportedly showing pens at the Russian naval base at Olenya Guba (Bay) that could accommodate belugas and other cetaceans.

Because of the Russian espionage theory, the newspaper Verdens Gang dubbed the whale Hvaldimir, a play on the first name of the Russian President, Vladimir Putin, and the Norwegian hval, whale; on 3 May the national broadcaster NRK announced that this was the winner of their public vote to name the whale, with "Joar", for the fisherman, polling second and "Agent James Beluga" third.

Morten Vikeby, a former Norwegian consul in Murmansk, has suggested that Hvaldimir was a therapy animal from a programme for disabled children at the Arctic Circle Padi Dive Centre and Lodge, near the Russian–Norwegian border; specifically, he may be Semyon, who was placed with the centre while still young after being attacked by sea lions and was featured in an article Vikeby wrote about the institution in 2008 for the magazine Fiskeribladet. The harness would be for the purpose of towing a boat with children inside. That institution no longer uses therapy belugas, and Vikeby suggested making use of Hvaldimir to advertise Hammerfest.

== See also ==
- Benny, a beluga whale that was resident in the Thames Estuary from 2018 to 2019
- Moby Dick, a beluga whale which became a sensation in Germany and the Netherlands after being sighted in the Lower Rhine in 1966
- List of individual cetaceans
