= Sola Church =

Church in Rogaland, Norway

- Sola kirke
- Sola Church
- 58.88886°N 5.647997°E
- Location: Sola Municipality, Rogaland
- Country: Norway
- Denomination: Church of Norway
- Churchmanship: Evangelical Lutheran

History
- Status: Parish church
- Founded: 2020
- Consecrated: 18 Oct 2020

Architecture
- Functional status: Active
- Architect(s): Brandsbergs- Dahl Arkitekter
- Architectural type: Rectangular
- Groundbreaking: 29 Mar 2019
- Completed: 2020
- Construction cost: 91 million kr

Specifications
- Capacity: 700
- Materials: Concrete

Administration
- Diocese: Stavanger bispedømme
- Deanery: Tungenes prosti
- Parish: Sola

Sola Church (Norwegian: Sola kirke) is a parish church of the Church of Norway in Sola Municipality in Rogaland county, Norway. It is located in the village of Solakrossen. It is the church for the Sola parish which is part of the Tungenes prosti (deanery) in the Diocese of Stavanger. The gray concrete church was built in a rectangular design in 2020 using designs by the architectural firm Brandsbergs-Dahl Arkitekter. The church seats about 700 people.

The church was built to replace the Old Sola Church as the main church for the parish. The old church, built around the year 1140, was located outside of the village on the other side of the airport. This church cost a total of 91 million kr to build.

== See also ==
- List of churches in Rogaland
