= Tananger Church =

Church in Rogaland, Norway

- Tananger kirke
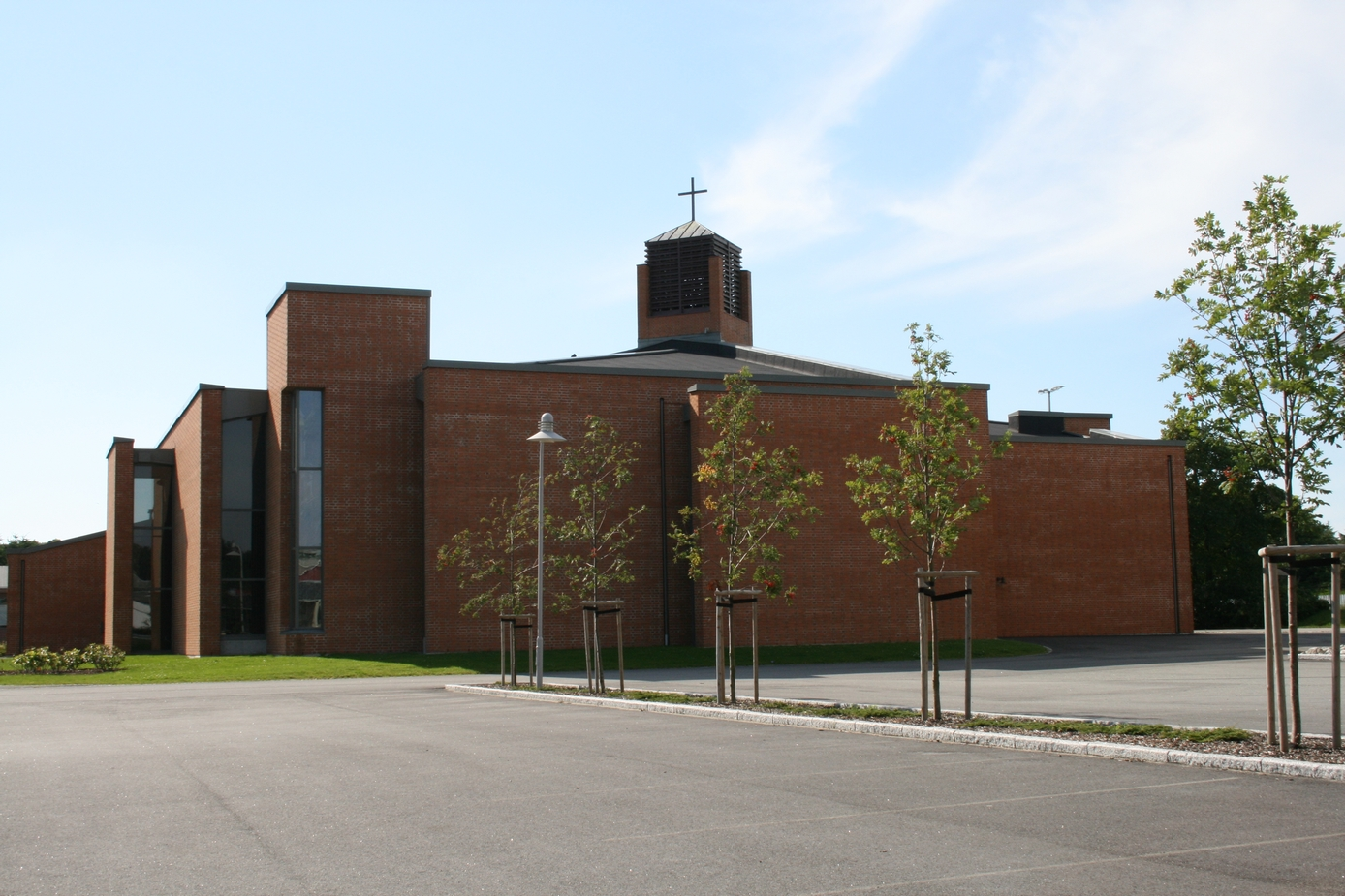
- View of the church
- Tananger Church
- 58.935359°N 5.60317°E
- Location: Sola Municipality, Rogaland
- Country: Norway
- Denomination: Church of Norway
- Churchmanship: Evangelical Lutheran

History
- Status: Parish church
- Founded: 2002
- Consecrated: 1 Sep 2002

Architecture
- Functional status: Active
- Architect: Olav Urstad
- Architectural type: Fan-shaped
- Completed: 2002

Specifications
- Capacity: 400
- Materials: Brick

Administration
- Diocese: Stavanger bispedømme
- Deanery: Tungenes prosti
- Parish: Tananger

Tananger Church (Norwegian: Tananger kirke) is a parish church of the Church of Norway in Sola Municipality in Rogaland county, Norway. It is located in the village of Tananger. It is the church for the Tananger parish which is part of the Tungenes prosti (deanery) in the Diocese of Stavanger. The large, brick church was built in a fan-shaped design in 2002 using designs by the architect Olav Urstad. The church seats about 400 people.

== History ==
The church was built in 2002 to replace the Old Tananger Church, which was later renamed Tananger Chapel. The new church was consecrated on 1 September 2002.

== See also ==
- List of churches in Rogaland
