= Sørnes =

Village in Sola Municipality, Norway

Sørnes Saurnes (historic)
- Village
- Interactive map of Sørnes
- Coordinates: 58.90967°N 5.65613°E
- Country: Norway
- Region: Western Norway
- County: Rogaland
- District: Jæren
- Municipality: Sola Municipality
- Elevation: 18 m (59 ft)
- Time zone: UTC+01:00 (CET)
  - Summer (DST): UTC+02:00 (CEST)
- Post Code: 4052 Røyneberg

Sørnes is a village in Sola Municipality in Rogaland county, Norway. The village is located at the southeastern end of the Hafrsfjorden, about 10 kilometres (6.2 mi) southwest of the city of Stavanger. The village is a part of the larger Stavanger/Sandnes metropolitan area. The village lies just west of the European route E39 highway and a short distance north of the village of Solakrossen.

A large proportion of the population commutes to work in nearby Stavanger. The village is named after the old Sørnes farm (Old Norse: Suđrnes). The first element is suđr which means "southern" and the last element is nes which means "headland".

== Climate ==
Climate data for Stavanger Airport, Sola 1991-2020 normals (7 m, extremes 1947–present, sunshine 1961-1990)
Month	Jan	Feb	Mar	Apr	May	Jun	Jul	Aug	Sep	Oct	Nov	Dec	Year
Record high °C (°F)	12.4 (54.3)	13.9 (57.0)	17.7 (63.9)	25.2 (77.4)	29.4 (84.9)	30.5 (86.9)	32.5 (90.5)	33.5 (92.3)	29.3 (84.7)	22.3 (72.1)	16.2 (61.2)	12 (54)	33.5 (92.3)
Mean daily maximum °C (°F)	4.8 (40.6)	4.6 (40.3)	6.5 (43.7)	10.4 (50.7)	13.8 (56.8)	16.3 (61.3)	18.6 (65.5)	19 (66)	16.1 (61.0)	11.9 (53.4)	8 (46)	5.6 (42.1)	11.3 (52.3)
Daily mean °C (°F)	2.6 (36.7)	2.1 (35.8)	3.7 (38.7)	6.9 (44.4)	10.2 (50.4)	13 (55)	15.3 (59.5)	15.7 (60.3)	13.2 (55.8)	9.2 (48.6)	5.7 (42.3)	3.4 (38.1)	8.4 (47.1)
Mean daily minimum °C (°F)	0 (32)	−0.4 (31.3)	0.9 (33.6)	3.6 (38.5)	6.8 (44.2)	9.9 (49.8)	12.4 (54.3)	12.7 (54.9)	10.3 (50.5)	6.4 (43.5)	3 (37)	0.6 (33.1)	5.5 (41.9)
Record low °C (°F)	−19.8 (−3.6)	−19.2 (−2.6)	−16.2 (2.8)	−7.9 (17.8)	−2.5 (27.5)	0.6 (33.1)	4.3 (39.7)	1.2 (34.2)	−2.5 (27.5)	−5.2 (22.6)	−16.1 (3.0)	−16.1 (3.0)	−19.8 (−3.6)
Average precipitation mm (inches)	118.5 (4.67)	99.6 (3.92)	80.5 (3.17)	62.5 (2.46)	62.1 (2.44)	67.3 (2.65)	91.2 (3.59)	126.5 (4.98)	132 (5.2)	148.3 (5.84)	135.2 (5.32)	132.4 (5.21)	1,256.1 (49.45)
Average precipitation days (≥ 1.0 mm)	16	14	13	11	10	10	12	14	15	17	16	17	165
Average relative humidity (%)	82	81	78	77	75	78	78	80	80	81	82	82	80
Mean monthly sunshine hours	48	79	140	168	226	222	197	159	141	80	45	33	1,538
Source 1: yr.no/met.no
Source 2: NOAA - WMO averages 91-2020 Norway
