= Håkon Rege =

Norwegian politician (born 1955)

Håkon Rege (born 30 September 1955) is a Norwegian politician for the Progress and Conservative parties.

Rege was originally a member of the Progress Party, and in 1988 he became the party's first mayor in Sola Municipality, holding the position until 1989. In 1995, he however had "had enough of the party", and resigned and went over to the Conservative Party. He was again elected mayor of Sola from 1999 until 2011, having been re-elected in 2003 and 2007. He announced in 2010 that he didn't want to seek re-election at the 2011 local elections. He was succeeded by his nephew, Ole Ueland, also from the Conservative Party.
