= County municipality =

Wikimedia disambiguation page

County municipality is a designation for an administrative division in Norway and in Canada.

| Set | Location | Remarks |
|---|---|---|
| County municipality (Norway) | in Norway | |
| County municipality (Nova Scotia) | in Nova Scotia, Canada | |

== See also ==
- County
- Municipality
