= Stavanger/Sandnes =

Urban area in Rogaland, Norway

- Urban area
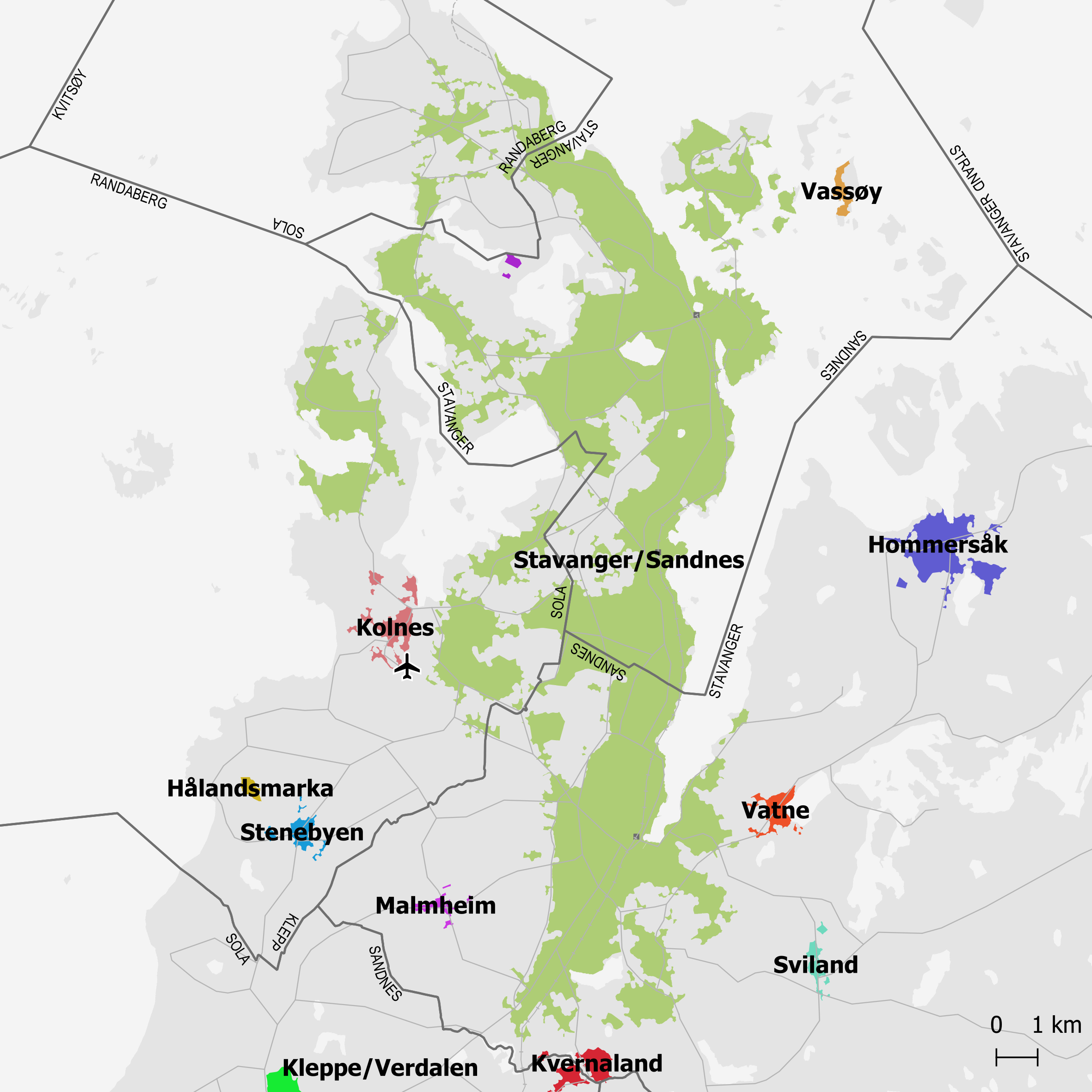
- The green areas are included in Stavanger/Sandnes
- Coordinates: 58°57′54″N 05°43′04″E
- Country: Norway
- Region: Western Norway
- County: Rogaland
- District: Jæren

Area
  - Total: 80.13 km^{2} (30.94 sq mi)

Population (2025)
  - Total: 241,644
  - Density: 3,016/km^{2} (7,810/sq mi)
- Time zone: UTC+01:00 (CET)
  - Summer (DST): UTC+02:00 (CEST)

Stavanger/Sandnes is the third largest urban area in Norway. It consists of the densely built-up areas in the municipalities of Stavanger, Sandnes, Sola, and Randaberg, most of which are located on the Stavanger Peninsula, its surrounding islands, and the mainland south of the peninsula. Stavanger/Sandnes is the central part of the Stavanger Region.

The 80.13-square-kilometre (30.9 sq mi) urban area has a population (2025) of 241,644 and a population density of 3,016 inhabitants per square kilometre (7,810/sq mi). The area has had a big growth in population, and is one of the fastest growing urban areas in Norway. It is expected that larger portions of Sola Municipality will grow together with the urban area in the future.

== Population ==
Population in the urban area by municipality
Name	Population in this urban area	Total municipal population
Stavanger Municipality	139,358	150,123
Sandnes Municipality	67,919	84,908
Sola Municipality	24,064	29,153
Randaberg Municipality	10,303	11,795
