= Tjelta =

Village in Sola Municipality, Norway

Tjelta Stenebyen
- Village
- Interactive map of Tjelta
- Coordinates: 58.84146°N 5.59774°E
- Country: Norway
- Region: Western Norway
- County: Rogaland
- District: Jæren
- Municipality: Sola Municipality

Area
  - Total: 0.4 km^{2} (0.15 sq mi)
- Elevation: 38 m (125 ft)

Population (2025)
  - Total: 990
  - Density: 2,475/km^{2} (6,410/sq mi)
- Time zone: UTC+01:00 (CET)
  - Summer (DST): UTC+02:00 (CEST)
- Post Code: 4054 Tjelta

Tjelta or Stenebyen is a village in Sola Municipality in Rogaland county, Norway. The village is located in the south part of the municipality, about 2 kilometres (1.2 mi) southeast of the village of Hålandsmarka. The 0.4-square-kilometre (99-acre) village has a population (2025) of 990 and a population density of 2,475 inhabitants per square kilometre (6,410/sq mi).
