= Stavanger Peninsula =

Peninsula in Rogaland County, Norway

Coordinates: 58°56′N 5°42′E

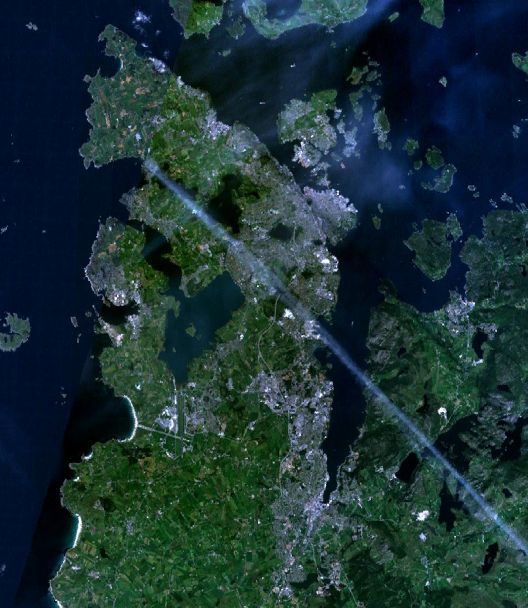
Satellite image of the peninsula.

Stavanger Peninsula (Norwegian: Stavangerhalvøya) is a peninsula in Rogaland County, Norway. The peninsula is named for the city of Stavanger, located on its northeastern shore and it includes the most populous parts of the Greater Stavanger urban area. The peninsula extends from a line between the Sandnes harbour at the southern end of the Gandsfjorden straight west to the village of Ølbør in Sola Municipality. This line runs just south of Stavanger Airport. The peninsula is delimited by the Gandsfjorden, Boknafjorden, Byfjorden, and the North Sea.

Stavanger Peninsula includes Randaberg Municipality, as well as parts of Stavanger Municipality, Sandnes Municipality, and Sola Municipality.

The name Stavanger Peninsula is occasionally used interchangeably with North Jæren (Norwegian: Nord-Jæren), but the former is a geographical region, while the latter is a political definition.

== See also ==
- List of peninsulas
