= Sola, Norway =

Municipality in Rogaland, Norway

Sola Municipality Sola kommune
- Municipality
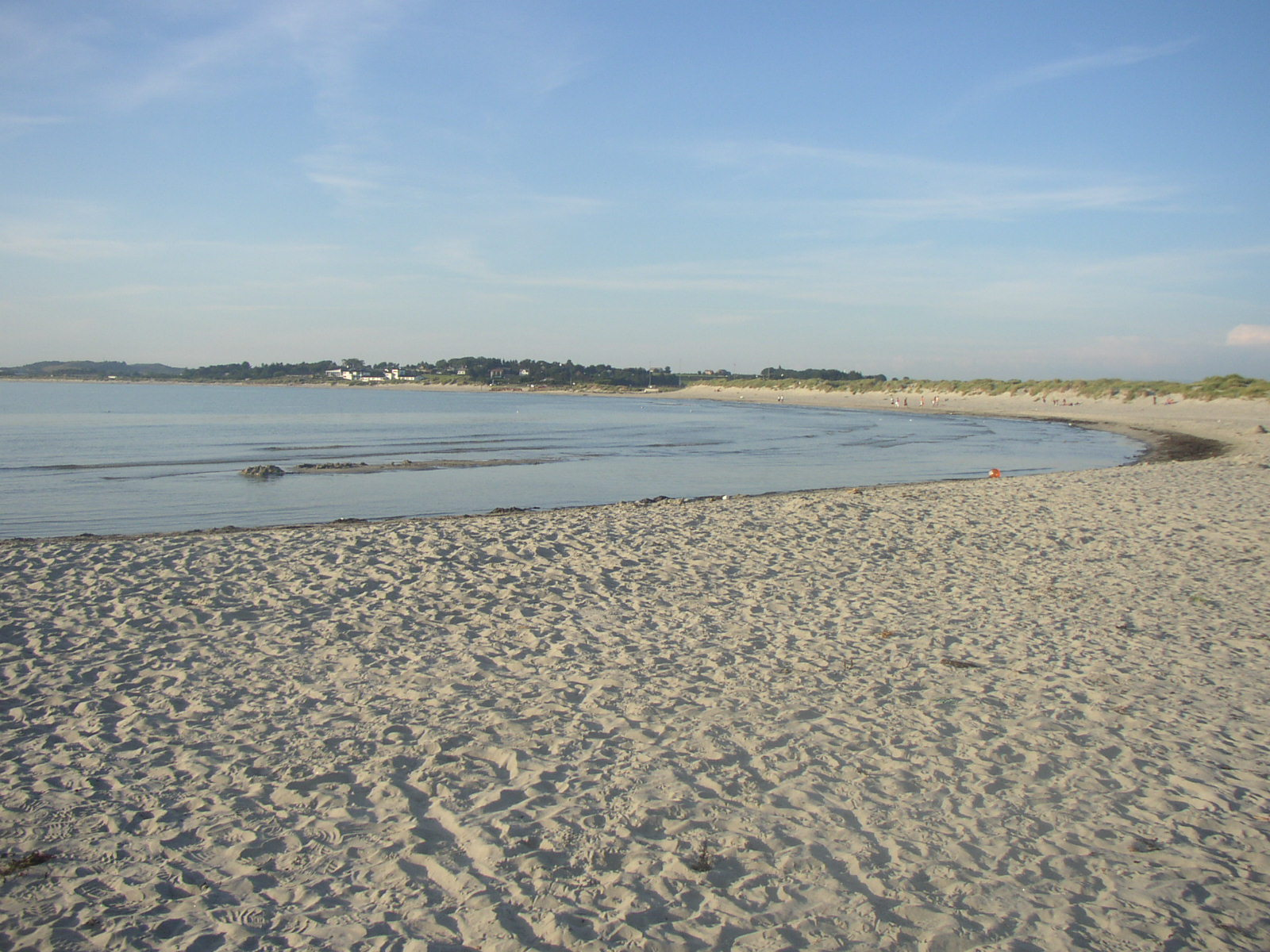
- View of a beach in Sola

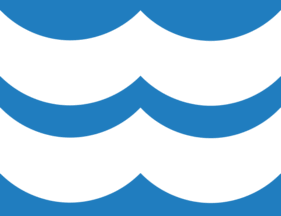
- Flag Coat of arms

- Rogaland within Norway

- Sola within Rogaland
- Coordinates: 58°52′48″N 05°37′43″E
- Country: Norway
- County: Rogaland
- District: Jæren
- Established: 1930
  - Preceded by: Håland Municipality
- Administrative centre: Solakrossen

Government
  - Mayor (2023): Janne Stangeland Rege (H)

Area
  - Total: 69.05 km^{2} (26.66 sq mi)
  - Land: 68.83 km^{2} (26.58 sq mi)
  - Water: 0.22 km^{2} (0.085 sq mi) 0.3%
  - Rank: #343 in Norway
- Highest elevation: 101.84 m (334.1 ft)

Population (2026)
  - Total: 29,541
  - Rank: #39 in Norway
  - Density: 427.8/km^{2} (1,108/sq mi)
  - Change (10 years): ▲ +13.2%
- Demonym: Solabu

Official language
  - Norwegian form: Neutral
- Time zone: UTC+01:00 (CET)
  - Summer (DST): UTC+02:00 (CEST)
- ISO 3166 code: NO-1124
- Website: Official website

Sola is a municipality and a seaside resort area in Rogaland county, Norway. It is located in the traditional district of Jæren. The administrative centre of the municipality is the village of Solakrossen. Other villages include Tananger, Hålandsmarka, Sørnes, and Tjelta. Stavanger Airport is located in Sola, just a short distance from the centre of the large Stavanger/Sandnes metropolitan area.

The 69.05-square-kilometre (26.66 sq mi) municipality is the 343r largest by area out of the 357 municipalities in Norway. Sola Municipality is the 39th most populous municipality in Norway with a population of 29,541. The municipality's population density is 427.8 inhabitants per square kilometre (1,108/sq mi) and its population has increased by 13.2% over the previous 10-year period.

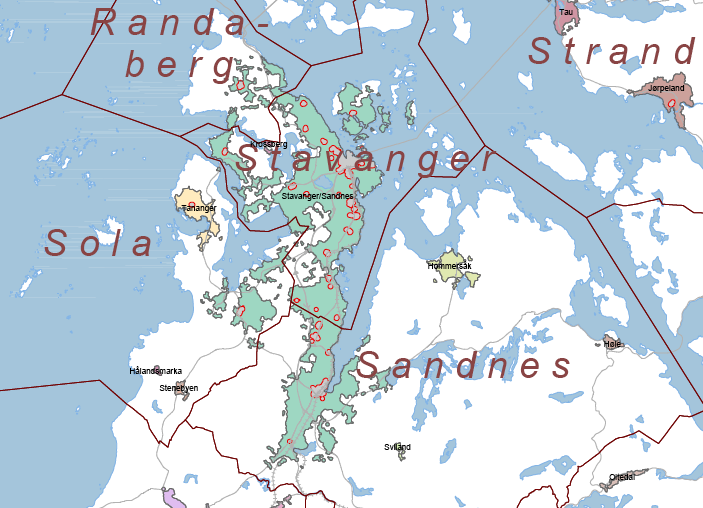
Map of the Sola area

In the western part of Sola, there are 5 kilometres (3.1 mi) of long, sandy beaches facing the North Sea. The usually suitable wind and waves make the sandy beaches a popular place for windsurfing.

== General information ==
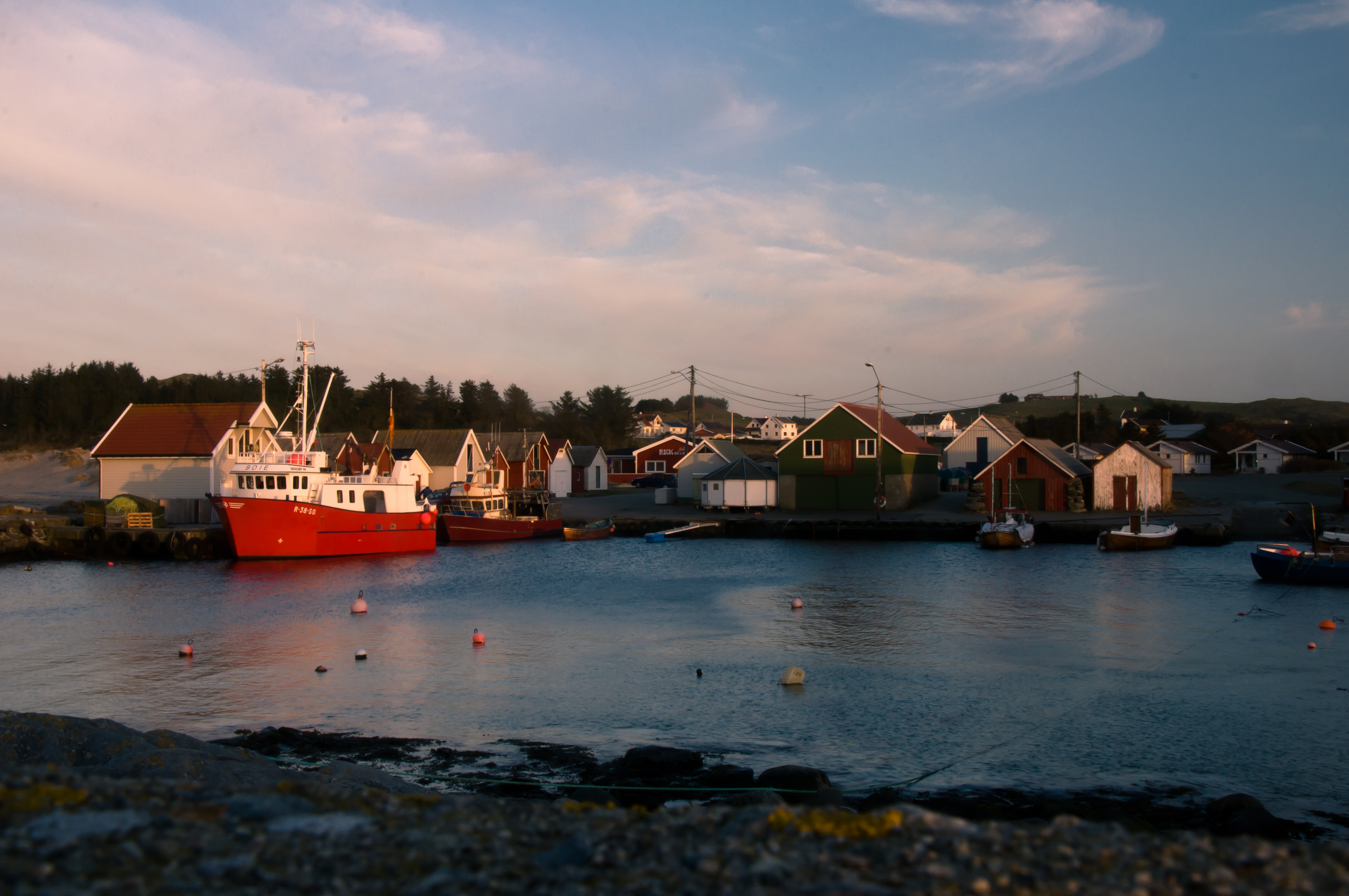
View of Ølberg at sunset

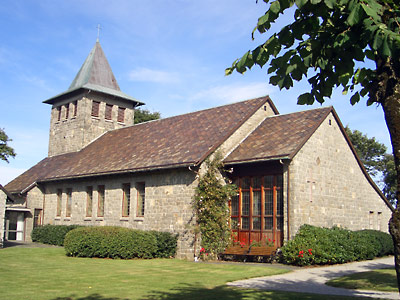
Sola Church

The municipality of Sola was established in 1930 when the old Håland Municipality was divided as follows:

- the areas located south of the Hafrsfjord (population: 3,372) became the new Sola Municipality
- the areas located northeast of the Hafrsfjord (population: 1,091) became the new Madla Municipality

On 1 January 2017, a small 350-decare (86-acre) area on the southwestern edge of the village of Solakrossen was transferred from Sandnes Municipality to Sola Municipality.

=== Name ===
The municipality (originally the parish) is named after the old Sola farm (Old Norse: Sóli) since the first Sola Church was built there. The meaning of the name is uncertain. One possibility is that it comes from the word sól which means "sun". Historically, the name was also spelled Sole.

=== Coat of arms ===
The coat of arms was granted on 12 February 1982. The official blazon is "Azure, two bars double embowed argent" (Norwegian: I blått to sølv bjelker dannet ved et omvendt dobbelt buesnitt). This means the arms have a blue field (background) and the charge is a set of two curved bars that look like waves. The charge has a tincture of argent which means it is commonly colored white, but if it is made out of metal, then silver is used. The blue color symbolizes the sea and the white/silver color symbolizes the whitecaps of the waves washing up to the long, shallow, sandy beaches along the ocean in the municipality. The arms were designed by the painter Roald Kyllingstad. The municipal flag has the same design as the coat of arms.

=== Churches ===
The Church of Norway has four parishes (sokn) within Sola Municipality. It is part of the Tungenes prosti (deanery) in the Diocese of Stavanger.

Churches in Sola Municipality
Parish (sokn)	Church name	Location of the church	Year built
Ræge	Ræge Church	Ræge (north of Tjelta)	2009
Sola	Sola Church	Solakrossen	2020
Sola	Sola Chapel	west of Solakrossen	1955
Sørnes	Sørnes Church	Sørnes	1977
Tananger	Tananger Church	Tananger	2002
Tananger	Tananger Chapel	Tananger	1879

== Geography ==
Sola Municipality lies on the west side of the Stavanger Peninsula, south of the Hafrsfjord. The municipality sits just about 5 kilometres (3.1 mi) from the centres of the cities of Stavanger and Sandnes. The island of Rott lies just off the western coast of Sola. The Fladholmen Lighthouse lies just off shore of the village of Tananger in northern Sola. The highest point in the municipality is the 101.84-metre (334.1 ft) tall mountain Kjerrberget.

Stavanger Municipality is located to the northeast, Sandnes Municipality is located to the east, Klepp Municipality is located to the south, and Kvitsøy Municipality is located to the northwest.

== Climate ==
Climate data for Stavanger Airport, Sola 1991-2020 normals (7 m, extremes 1947–present, sunshine 1961-1990)
Month	Jan	Feb	Mar	Apr	May	Jun	Jul	Aug	Sep	Oct	Nov	Dec	Year
Record high °C (°F)	12.4 (54.3)	13.9 (57.0)	17.7 (63.9)	25.2 (77.4)	29.4 (84.9)	30.5 (86.9)	32.5 (90.5)	33.5 (92.3)	29.3 (84.7)	22.3 (72.1)	16.2 (61.2)	12 (54)	33.5 (92.3)
Mean daily maximum °C (°F)	4.0 (39.2)	4.0 (39.2)	7.0 (44.6)	11.0 (51.8)	15.0 (59.0)	18.0 (64.4)	20.0 (68.0)	20.0 (68.0)	16.0 (60.8)	12.0 (53.6)	8.0 (46.4)	5.0 (41.0)	11.7 (53.0)
Daily mean °C (°F)	2.2 (36.0)	2.2 (36.0)	4.5 (40.1)	7.5 (45.5)	11.5 (52.7)	14.0 (57.2)	16.0 (60.8)	16.5 (61.7)	13.0 (55.4)	9.5 (49.1)	6.0 (42.8)	3.0 (37.4)	8.9 (48.0)
Mean daily minimum °C (°F)	0.5 (32.9)	0.5 (32.9)	2.0 (35.6)	4.0 (39.2)	8.0 (46.4)	10.0 (50.0)	12.0 (53.6)	13.0 (55.4)	10.0 (50.0)	7.0 (44.6)	4.0 (39.2)	1.0 (33.8)	6.0 (42.8)
Record low °C (°F)	−19.8 (−3.6)	−19.2 (−2.6)	−16.2 (2.8)	−7.9 (17.8)	−2.5 (27.5)	0.6 (33.1)	4.3 (39.7)	1.2 (34.2)	−2.5 (27.5)	−5.2 (22.6)	−16.1 (3.0)	−16.1 (3.0)	−19.8 (−3.6)
Average precipitation mm (inches)	118.5 (4.67)	99.6 (3.92)	80.5 (3.17)	62.5 (2.46)	62.1 (2.44)	67.3 (2.65)	91.2 (3.59)	126.5 (4.98)	132 (5.2)	148.3 (5.84)	135.2 (5.32)	132.4 (5.21)	1,256.1 (49.45)
Average precipitation days (≥ 1.0 mm)	16	14	13	11	10	10	12	14	15	17	16	17	165
Average relative humidity (%)	82	81	78	77	75	78	78	80	80	81	82	82	80
Mean monthly sunshine hours	48	79	140	168	226	222	197	159	141	80	45	33	1,538
Source 1: yr.no/met.no
Source 2: NOAA - WMO averages 91-2020 Norway

== History ==
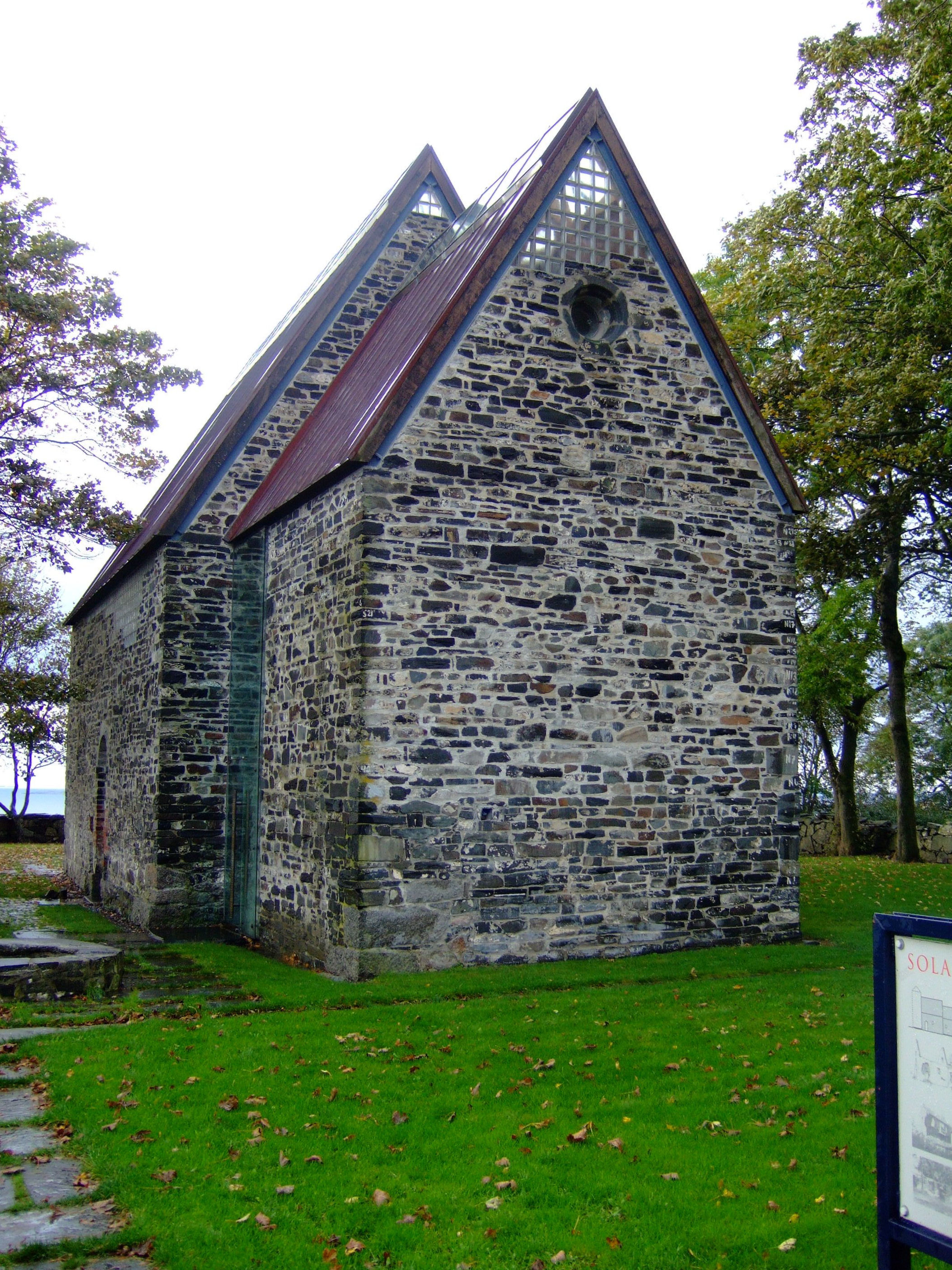
Sola Church Ruins

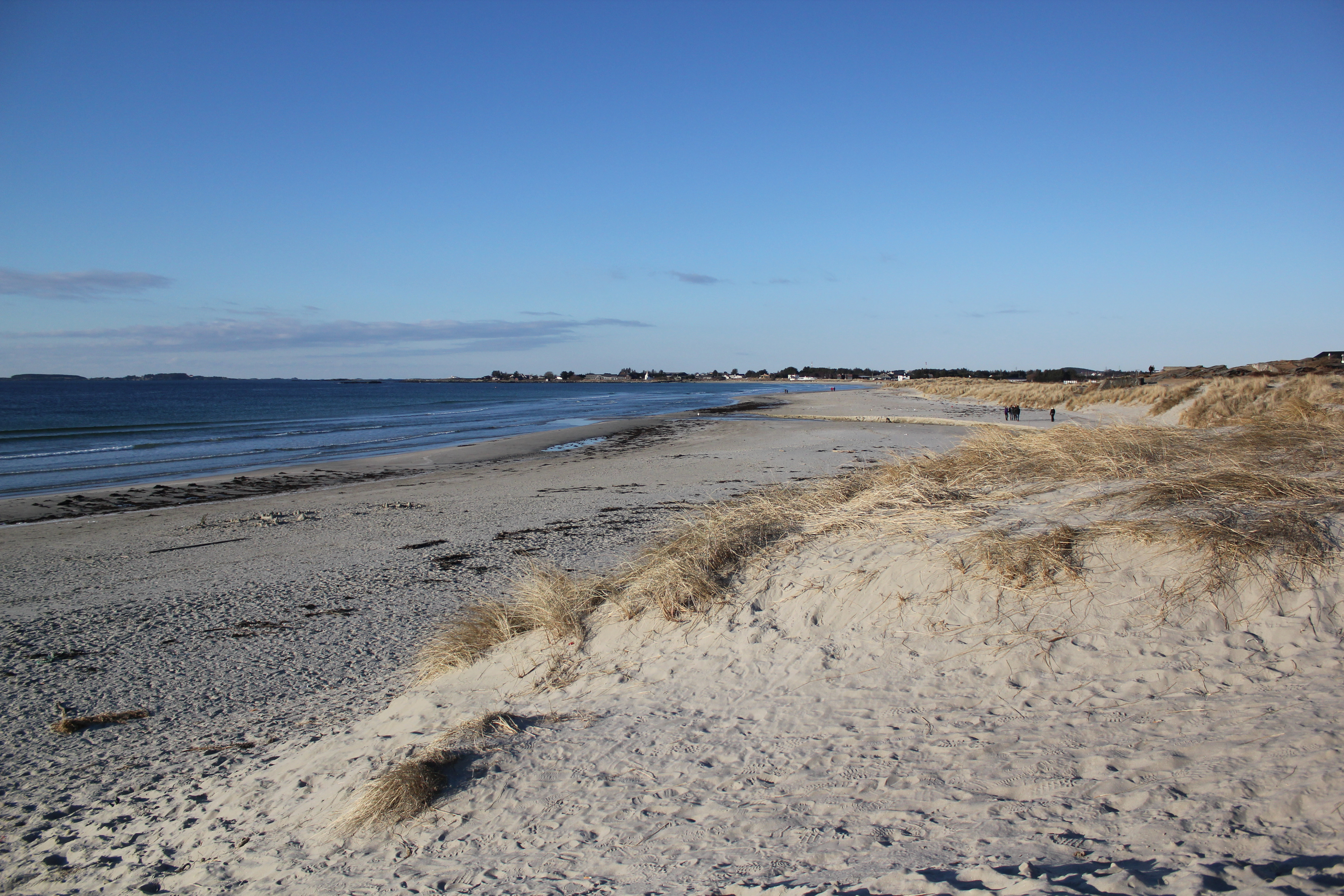
Beaches of Sola

According to Snorre Sturlason the Battle of Hafrsfjord took place in the year AD 872, probably outside Ytraberget. Harald Fairhair, the first king of Norway, is celebrated for having united Norway at this notable battle.

The stone crosses at Tjora date from about the year 1150. In early Christian times, these stone crosses were used as gathering points for religious ceremonies before churches were built. Sola Church Ruins (Sola ruinkirke) is the ruins of a Romanesque stone church dating from about the year 1120. The stone church probably replaced an older wooden church in the area. This wooden church was possibly the one that Erling Skjalgsson had built when he converted to Christianity at the end of the 10th century. Sola Church overlooked the Hafrsfjord and was in use until 1842.The artist Johan Bennetter (1822–1904) used the church as a studio and lived there with his family. During World War II, most of the church was demolished. It was later reconstructed, and the restoration was finished in 1995.

Stavanger Airport, Sola was founded in 1937. At Sola airport, the first opposed landing by paratroopers took place as German Fallschirmjägers from 1st battalion of the 1st Regiment, 7th Flieger Division were dropped on the airfield. Sola Air Station became an important airfield for the Germans during World War II.

== Population ==
Historical population
Year	1930	1946	1951	1960	1970	1980	1990	2000	2010	2020	2025
Pop.	3,372	4,071	5,025	6,880	9,597	12,324	15,719	18,915	22,831	27,153	29,153
±% p.a.	—	+1.18%	+4.30%	+3.55%	+3.38%	+2.53%	+2.46%	+1.87%	+1.90%	+1.75%	+1.43%
Source: Statistics Norway and Norwegian Historical Data Centre

== Government ==
Sola Municipality is responsible for primary education (through 10th grade), outpatient health services, senior citizen services, welfare and other social services, zoning, economic development, and municipal roads and utilities. The municipality is governed by a municipal council of directly elected representatives. The mayor is indirectly elected by a vote of the municipal council. The municipality is under the jurisdiction of the Sør-Rogaland District Court and the Gulating Court of Appeal.

=== Municipal council ===
The municipal council (Kommunestyre) of Sola Municipality is made up of 41 representatives that are elected to four year terms. The tables below show the current and historical composition of the council by political party.

Sola kommunestyre 2023–2027
Party name (in Norwegian)	Number of representatives
Labour Party (Arbeiderpartiet)	5
Progress Party (Fremskrittspartiet)	9
Green Party (Miljøpartiet De Grønne)	1
Conservative Party (Høyre)	15
Industry and Business Party (Industri‑ og Næringspartiet)	2
Christian Democratic Party (Kristelig Folkeparti)	3
Red Party (Rødt)	1
Centre Party (Senterpartiet)	2
Socialist Left Party (Sosialistisk Venstreparti)	2
Liberal Party (Venstre)	1
Total number of members:	41

Sola kommunestyre 2019–2023
Party name (in Norwegian)	Number of representatives
Labour Party (Arbeiderpartiet)	7
People's Action No to More Road Tolls (Folkeaksjonen nei til mer bompenger)	4
Progress Party (Fremskrittspartiet)	7
Green Party (Miljøpartiet De Grønne)	1
Conservative Party (Høyre)	12
Christian Democratic Party (Kristelig Folkeparti)	3
Centre Party (Senterpartiet)	4
Socialist Left Party (Sosialistisk Venstreparti)	2
Liberal Party (Venstre)	1
Total number of members:	41

Sola kommunestyre 2015–2019
Party name (in Norwegian)	Number of representatives
Labour Party (Arbeiderpartiet)	7
Progress Party (Fremskrittspartiet)	7
Green Party (Miljøpartiet De Grønne)	1
Conservative Party (Høyre)	16
Christian Democratic Party (Kristelig Folkeparti)	4
Centre Party (Senterpartiet)	2
Liberal Party (Venstre)	2
Tananger List (Tanangerlisten)	2
Total number of members:	41

Sola kommunestyre 2011–2015
Party name (in Norwegian)	Number of representatives
Labour Party (Arbeiderpartiet)	7
Progress Party (Fremskrittspartiet)	8
Conservative Party (Høyre)	15
Christian Democratic Party (Kristelig Folkeparti)	4
Pensioners' Party (Pensjonistpartiet)	1
Centre Party (Senterpartiet)	1
Socialist Left Party (Sosialistisk Venstreparti)	1
Liberal Party (Venstre)	2
Tananger List (Tanangerlisten)	2
Total number of members:	41

Sola kommunestyre 2007–2011
Party name (in Norwegian)	Number of representatives
Labour Party (Arbeiderpartiet)	6
Progress Party (Fremskrittspartiet)	10
Conservative Party (Høyre)	11
Christian Democratic Party (Kristelig Folkeparti)	4
Pensioners' Party (Pensjonistpartiet)	1
Centre Party (Senterpartiet)	2
Socialist Left Party (Sosialistisk Venstreparti)	2
Liberal Party (Venstre)	2
Tananger List (Tanangerlisten)	3
Total number of members:	41

Sola kommunestyre 2003–2007
Party name (in Norwegian)	Number of representatives
Labour Party (Arbeiderpartiet)	6
Progress Party (Fremskrittspartiet)	11
Conservative Party (Høyre)	11
Christian Democratic Party (Kristelig Folkeparti)	5
Centre Party (Senterpartiet)	2
Socialist Left Party (Sosialistisk Venstreparti)	3
Liberal Party (Venstre)	1
Tananger List (Tanangerlisten)	2
Total number of members:	41

Sola kommunestyre 1999–2003
Party name (in Norwegian)	Number of representatives
Labour Party (Arbeiderpartiet)	6
Progress Party (Fremskrittspartiet)	9
Conservative Party (Høyre)	12
Christian Democratic Party (Kristelig Folkeparti)	6
Centre Party (Senterpartiet)	3
Liberal Party (Venstre)	2
Sola local list (Sola bygdelista)	3
Total number of members:	41

Sola kommunestyre 1995–1999
Party name (in Norwegian)	Number of representatives
Labour Party (Arbeiderpartiet)	7
Progress Party (Fremskrittspartiet)	7
Conservative Party (Høyre)	9
Christian Democratic Party (Kristelig Folkeparti)	5
Pensioners' Party (Pensjonistpartiet)	1
Centre Party (Senterpartiet)	6
Liberal Party (Venstre)	2
Sola local list (Sola bygdelista)	4
Total number of members:	41

Sola kommunestyre 1991–1995
Party name (in Norwegian)	Number of representatives
Labour Party (Arbeiderpartiet)	6
Progress Party (Fremskrittspartiet)	8
Conservative Party (Høyre)	8
Christian Democratic Party (Kristelig Folkeparti)	5
Pensioners' Party (Pensjonistpartiet)	2
Centre Party (Senterpartiet)	6
Socialist Left Party (Sosialistisk Venstreparti)	2
Liberal Party (Venstre)	1
Sola local list (Sola bygdeliste)	3
Total number of members:	41

Sola kommunestyre 1987–1991
Party name (in Norwegian)	Number of representatives
Labour Party (Arbeiderpartiet)	7
Progress Party (Fremskrittspartiet)	10
Conservative Party (Høyre)	8
Christian Democratic Party (Kristelig Folkeparti)	5
Centre Party (Senterpartiet)	4
Socialist Left Party (Sosialistisk Venstreparti)	1
Joint list of the Liberal Party (Venstre) and Liberal People's Party (Liberale Folkepartiet)	2
Sola local list (Sola Bygdeliste)	4
Total number of members:	41

Sola kommunestyre 1983–1987
Party name (in Norwegian)	Number of representatives
Labour Party (Arbeiderpartiet)	9
Progress Party (Fremskrittspartiet)	6
Conservative Party (Høyre)	15
Christian Democratic Party (Kristelig Folkeparti)	5
Centre Party (Senterpartiet)	4
Joint list of the Liberal Party (Venstre) and Liberal People's Party (Liberale Folkepartiet)	2
Total number of members:	41

Sola kommunestyre 1979–1983
Party name (in Norwegian)	Number of representatives
Labour Party (Arbeiderpartiet)	9
Conservative Party (Høyre)	18
Christian Democratic Party (Kristelig Folkeparti)	6
New People's Party (Nye Folkepartiet)	2
Centre Party (Senterpartiet)	5
Liberal Party (Venstre)	1
Total number of members:	41

Sola kommunestyre 1975–1979
Party name (in Norwegian)	Number of representatives
Labour Party (Arbeiderpartiet)	10
Conservative Party (Høyre)	14
Christian Democratic Party (Kristelig Folkeparti)	7
New People's Party (Nye Folkepartiet)	2
Centre Party (Senterpartiet)	8
Total number of members:	41

Sola kommunestyre 1971–1975
Party name (in Norwegian)	Number of representatives
Labour Party (Arbeiderpartiet)	8
Conservative Party (Høyre)	7
Christian Democratic Party (Kristelig Folkeparti)	6
Centre Party (Senterpartiet)	7
Liberal Party (Venstre)	3
Total number of members:	31

Sola kommunestyre 1967–1971
Party name (in Norwegian)	Number of representatives
Labour Party (Arbeiderpartiet)	9
Conservative Party (Høyre)	7
Christian Democratic Party (Kristelig Folkeparti)	5
Centre Party (Senterpartiet)	6
Liberal Party (Venstre)	4
Total number of members:	31

Sola kommunestyre 1963–1967
Party name (in Norwegian)	Number of representatives
Labour Party (Arbeiderpartiet)	9
Conservative Party (Høyre)	6
Christian Democratic Party (Kristelig Folkeparti)	5
Centre Party (Senterpartiet)	6
Liberal Party (Venstre)	4
Local List(s) (Lokale lister)	1
Total number of members:	31

Sola herredsstyre 1959–1963
Party name (in Norwegian)	Number of representatives
Labour Party (Arbeiderpartiet)	4
Conservative Party (Høyre)	4
Christian Democratic Party (Kristelig Folkeparti)	5
Centre Party (Senterpartiet)	7
Local List(s) (Lokale lister)	5
Total number of members:	25

Sola herredsstyre 1955–1959
Party name (in Norwegian)	Number of representatives
Labour Party (Arbeiderpartiet)	4
Conservative Party (Høyre)	2
Christian Democratic Party (Kristelig Folkeparti)	6
Farmers' Party (Bondepartiet)	10
Local List(s) (Lokale lister)	3
Total number of members:	25

Sola herredsstyre 1951–1955
Party name (in Norwegian)	Number of representatives
Labour Party (Arbeiderpartiet)	3
Conservative Party (Høyre)	1
Christian Democratic Party (Kristelig Folkeparti)	4
Farmers' Party (Bondepartiet)	8
Joint List(s) of Non-Socialist Parties (Borgerlige Felleslister)	4
Total number of members:	20

Sola herredsstyre 1947–1951
Party name (in Norwegian)	Number of representatives
Labour Party (Arbeiderpartiet)	1
Christian Democratic Party (Kristelig Folkeparti)	6
Local List(s) (Lokale lister)	13
Total number of members:	20

Sola herredsstyre 1945–1947
Party name (in Norwegian)	Number of representatives
Labour Party (Arbeiderpartiet)	3
Christian Democratic Party (Kristelig Folkeparti)	7
Local List(s) (Lokale lister)	10
Total number of members:	20

Sola herredsstyre 1937–1941*
Party name (in Norwegian)	Number of representatives
Labour Party (Arbeiderpartiet)	3
List of workers, fishermen, and small farmholders (Arbeidere, fiskere, småbrukere liste)	7
Joint List(s) of Non-Socialist Parties (Borgerlige Felleslister)	10
Total number of members:	20
Note: Due to the German occupation of Norway during World War II, no elections were held for new municipal councils until after the war ended in 1945.

=== Mayors ===
The mayor (Norwegian: ordfører) of Sola Municipality is the political leader of the municipality and the chairperson of the municipal council. The following people have held this position:

- 1930–1931: Jakob Svendsen Gimre (H)
- 1931–1931: Gabriel Bore (Bp)
- 1932–1934: Gabriel Joa (Bp)
- 1935–1937: Gabriel Bore (Bp)
- 1938–1941: Gabriel Joa (Bp)
- 1942–1943: Sverre Johansson (NS)
- 1943–1945: Jakob Stokdal (NS)
- 1945–1945: Gabriel Joa (Bp)
- 1946–1947: Gabriel Bore (Bp)
- 1948–1951: Torger Sanne (LL)
- 1952–1959: Gabriel Joa (Bp)
- 1960–1961: Knut Rommetveit (Sp)
- 1962–1963: Leif Sømme (H)
- 1964–1971: Rasmus Reime (Sp)
- 1972–1975: Ole Gabriel Ueland (Sp)
- 1976–1977: Ludvig Klingsheim (H)
- 1978–1979: Andreas Sanne (KrF)
- 1980–1987: Kåre Kvalvik (H)
- 1988–1989: Håkon Rege (FrP)
- 1990–1991: Trygve Ersland (H)
- 1992–1995: Trygg Mæland (Sp)
- 1995–1999: Eli Hellestø (Sp)
- 1999–2011: Håkon Rege (H)
- 2011–2019: Ole Ueland (H)
- 2019–2023: Tom Henning Slethei (FrP)
- 2023–present: Janne Stangeland Rege (H)

== Museums ==
Museums in Sola include:

- The Aviation History Museum
- Rogaland Krigshistorisk Museum, a World War II museum
- Kystkultursamlingen i Tananger, a Maritime collection

== Notable people ==
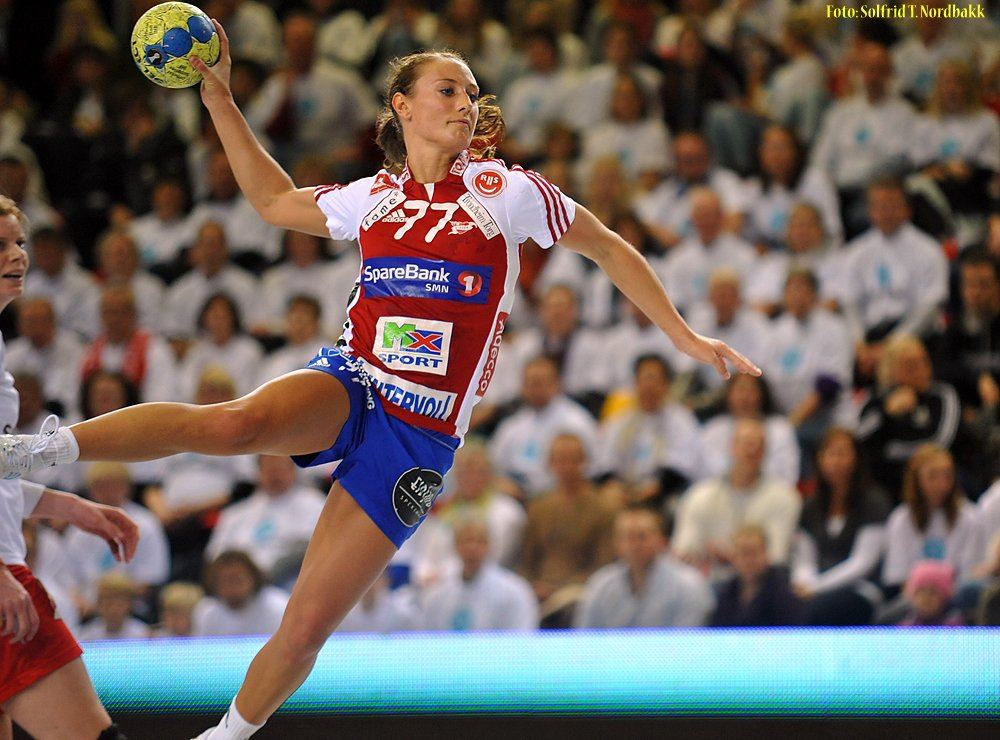
Camilla Herrem, 2009

- Andrew Lawrenceson Smith (ca.1620 - ca.1694), a Scottish craftsman, woodcutter, and painter from the Stavanger renaissance
- Andreas Meling (1839 in Sola – 1928), a ship owner, politician, and mayor of Stavanger from 1893
- Rasmus Sørnes (1893 in Sola – 1967), an inventor, clockmaker, and radio technician who made advanced astronomical clocks
- Tor Sørnes (1925 in Sola – 2017), an author, politician, and engineer who invented the VingCard
- Bjørn Bue (1934 in Sola – 1997), a Lutheran missionary and Bishop of Stavanger from 1986 to 1997
- Håkon Rege (born 1955), a politician and mayor of Sola from 1999 to 2011
- Finn Øglænd (born 1957), an author, poet, and literature critic who grew up at Tananger
- Svein Fjælberg (born 1959 in Sola), a former footballer with 128 caps with Viking FK and 33 with Norway
- Rita Eriksen (born 1966 in Sola) & Frank Eriksen (born 1961 in Sola), musicians with Eriksen; a roots, country, and blues band
- Solveig Horne (born 1969), a politician and Minister of Children and Families who lives in Sola
- Camilla Herrem (born 1986 in Sola), a handball player with 262 caps with Norway women and four Olympic team medals (Gold in London 2012, and in Paris 2024, Bronze in Rio 2016, and in Tokyo 2020)
