= Utstein =

Utstein may refer to:

== Places ==
- Utstein Abbey, a historic abbey in Rennesøy, Norway
- Utstein Church, a historic church in Rennesøy, Norway

== Other uses ==
- HNoMS Utstein, several submarines of the Royal Norwegian Navy
- Utstein Style, a set of guidelines for uniform reporting of cardiac arrest

== See also ==
- Utsteinen Nunatak, a nunatuk in Queen Maud Land, Antarctica
