= S302 =

S302 may refer to:

- HNoMS Utstein (S302), a Royal Norwegian Navy Ula class submarine
- Sony Ericsson S302, a 2008 mobile phone model
- a Victorian Railways S class (diesel) locomotive
