= St. Olav's Abbey, Stavanger =

Medieval church in Stavanger, Norway

Coordinates: 59°54′22″N 10°46′09″E

St. Olav's Abbey, Stavanger (Norwegian: Olavsklosteret i Stavanger) was a medieval era house of Augustinian Canons in Stavanger, Norway.

== History ==
St. Olav's Abbey is believed to have been one of the first Augustinian monastic foundations in Norway. The exact date of foundation is unknown, but it was certainly there by 1160. It was dedicated to Saint Olav. It is last recorded as a monastery in 1236. The monks seem to have relocated to the newly founded Utstein Abbey on the island of Mosterøy not far from Stavanger. Utstein Abbey was established during the reign of King Magnus VI of Norway (1263–80). The lands and possessions of the earlier monastery were also transferred to the ownership of Utstein.

St. Olav's Abbey remained in use as a church in Stavanger until the Protestant Reformation. In 1577, Royal permission was given to demolish it and to reuse the stone. Ruins were discovered in 1847, but they are no longer visible. The site was located on the present day Haakon VII's gate in Stavanger.

== Other sources ==
- Helle, Knut (1975): Stavanger fra våg til by (Stavanger: Hovedkommisjon hos Stabenfeldt Forlag) ISBN 8253201893
