= Utstein Church =

Church in Rogaland, Norway

- Utstein klosterkyrkje
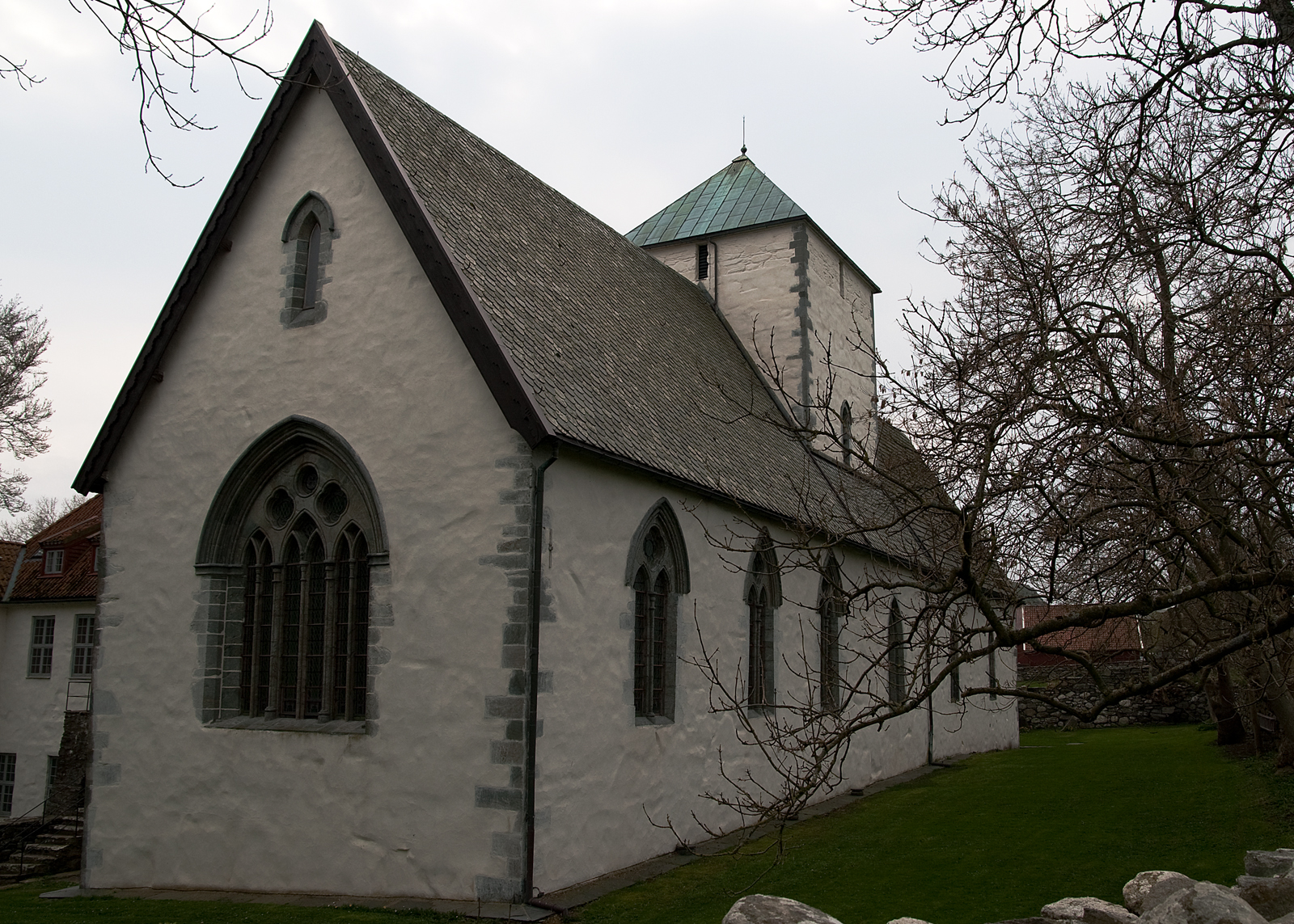
- View of the church
- Utstein Church
- 59.10333°N 5.59066°E
- Location: Stavanger Municipality, Rogaland
- Country: Norway
- Denomination: Church of Norway
- Previous denomination: Catholic Church
- Churchmanship: Evangelical Lutheran

History
- Status: Parish church
- Dedication: Saint Lawrence

Architecture
- Functional status: Inactive
- Architectural type: Long church
- Groundbreaking: 1263
- Completed: 1280
- Closed: 1899

Specifications
- Capacity: 300
- Materials: Stone

Administration
- Diocese: Stavanger bispedømme
- Deanery: Tungenes prosti
- Parish: Mosterøy
- Norwegian Cultural Heritage Site
- Type: Church
- Status: Automatically protected
- ID: 87030

Utstein Church (Norwegian: Utstein klosterkyrkje) is a historic parish church of the Church of Norway in the large Stavanger Municipality in Rogaland county, Norway. It is located on the grounds of the historic Utstein Abbey on the island of Klosterøy. It was historically the church for the Mosterøy parish which is part of the Tungenes prosti (deanery) in the Diocese of Stavanger. The medieval stone church was built in a long church design around the year 1280 using designs by an unknown architect. The church seats about 300 people.

== History ==
The construction of the church began in 1263 and the stone church was completed in the year 1280. The church was built on the site of the Utstein Abbey and it was dedicated to Saint Lawrence. The church was given to the Augustinian order by Magnus Lagabøte. Both the nave and chancel are rectangular and of the same size, and between the two parts of the building there is a central tower. The church has gothic gate windows and in the ceilings there are cross-rib vaults. The soapstone baptismal font is from the 12th century, while the rest of the medieval furniture has been lost. Both the altarpiece, pulpit, and pews were made in Renaissance style around 1620, but the altarpiece was later modernized in the 18th century, with baroque framing.

The monastery was looted and burned on two occasions during the first half of the 16th century. The church was used as a regular parish church until 1899 when it was taken out of regular use. Since then, the church has been a historic protected site that is only used as a church for special occasions.

== Media gallery ==
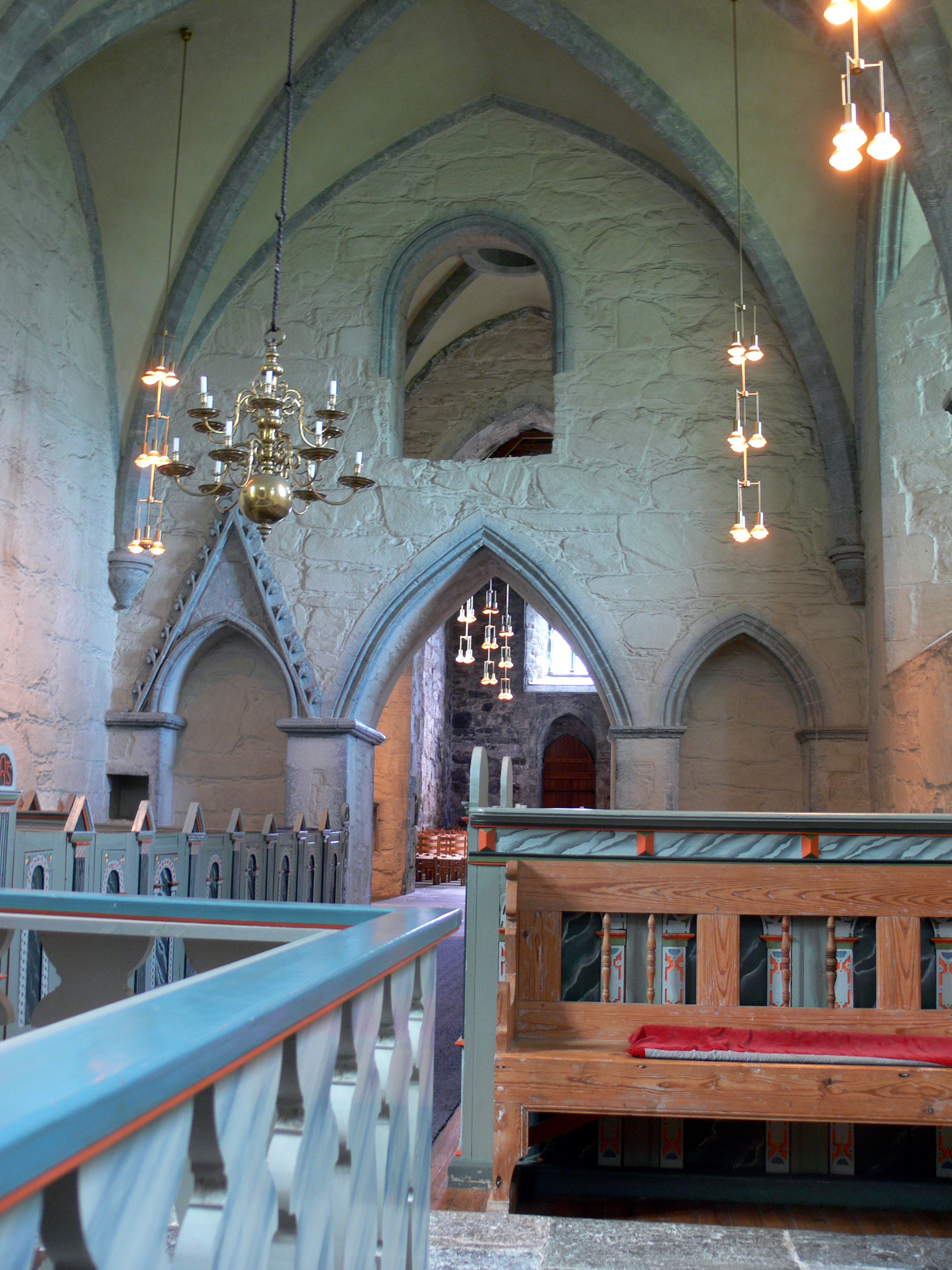

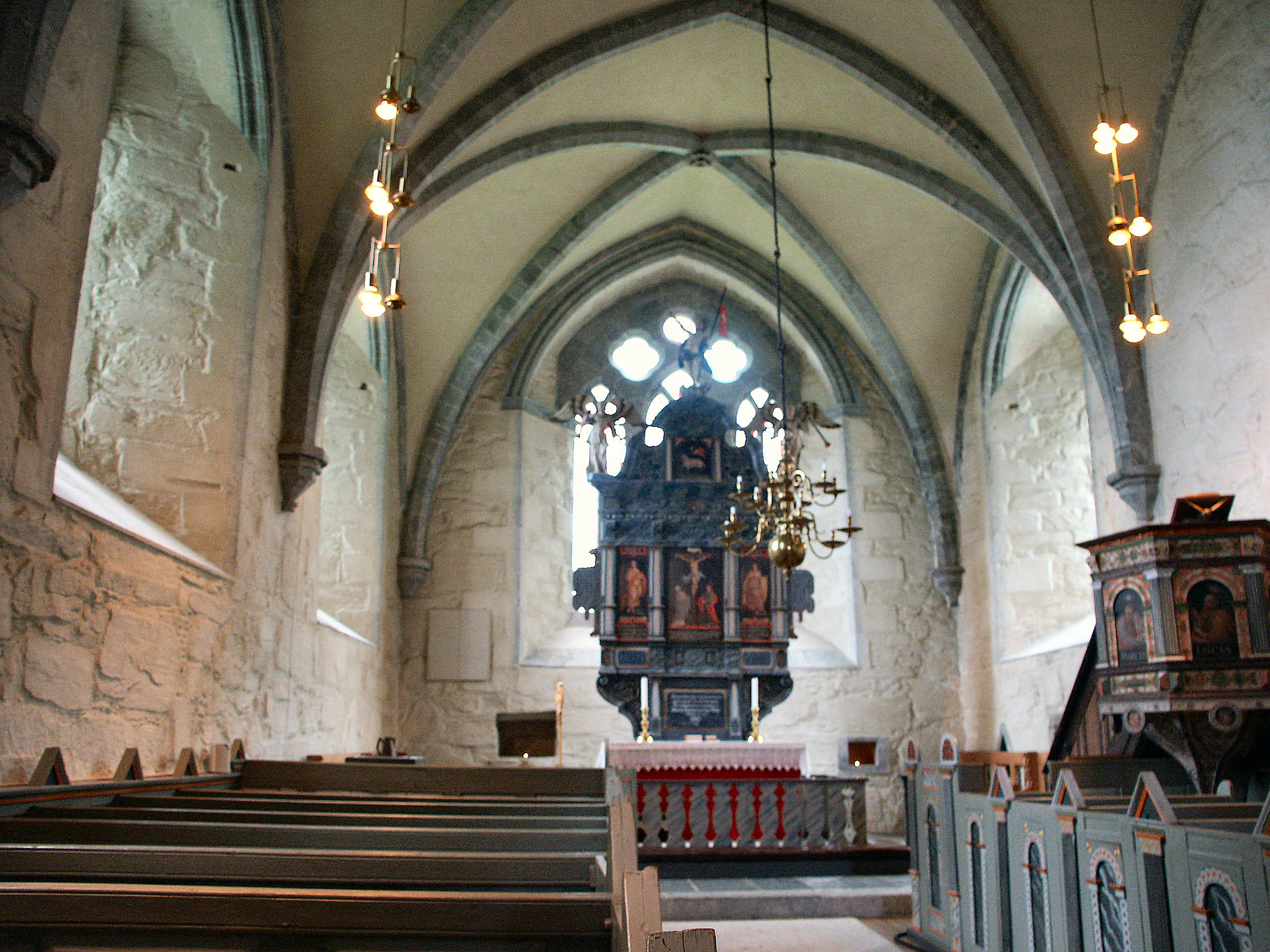

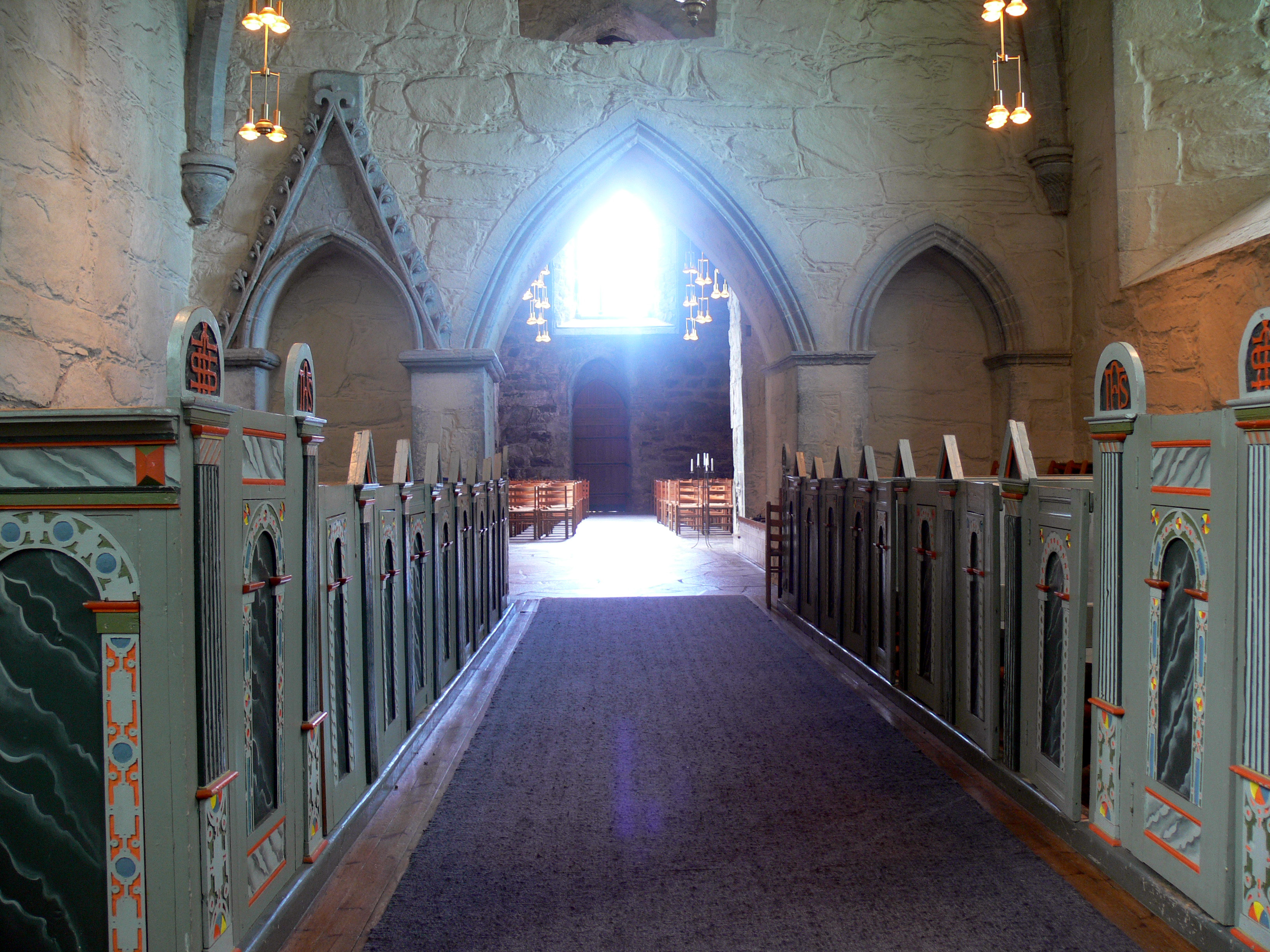

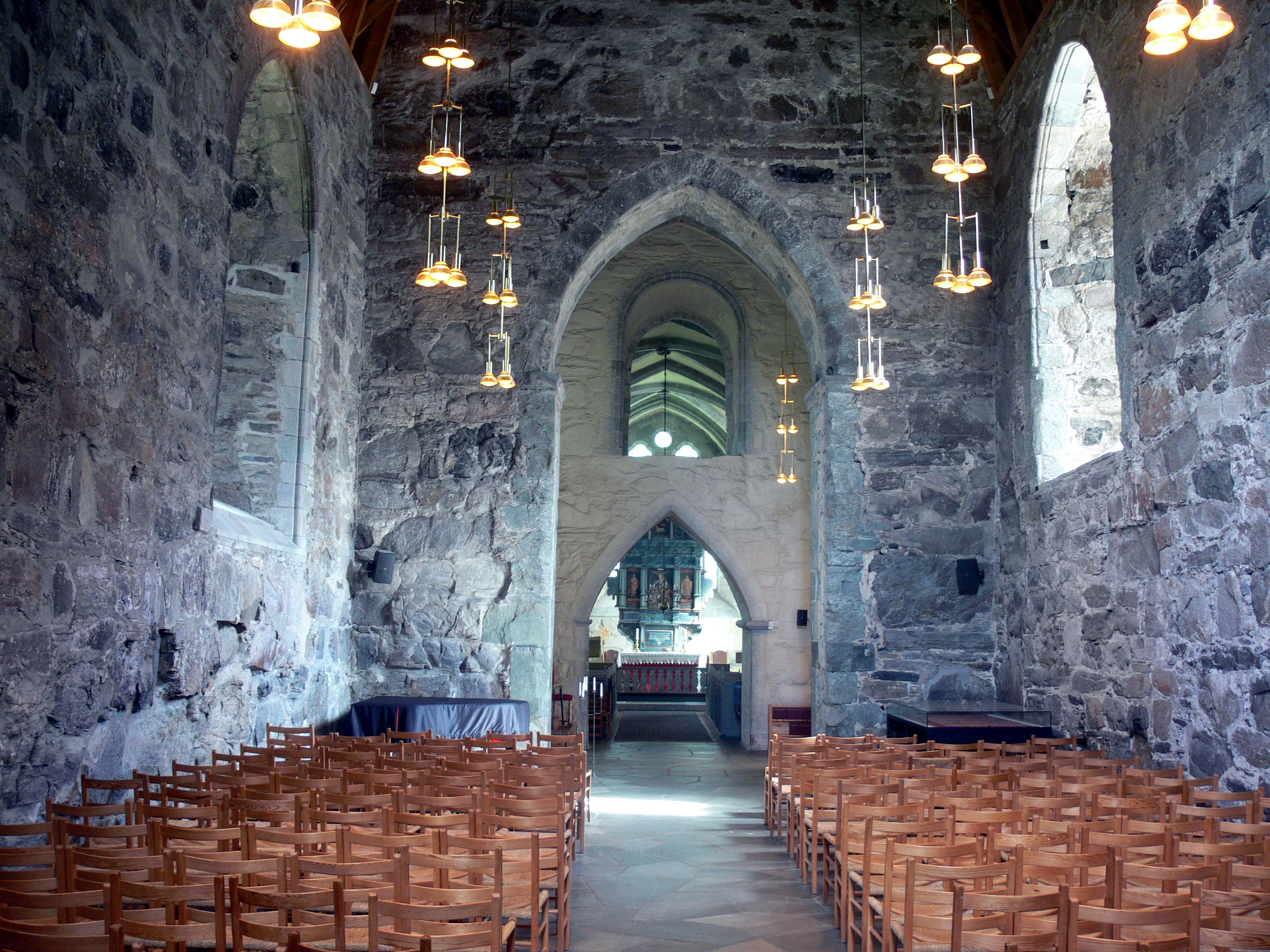

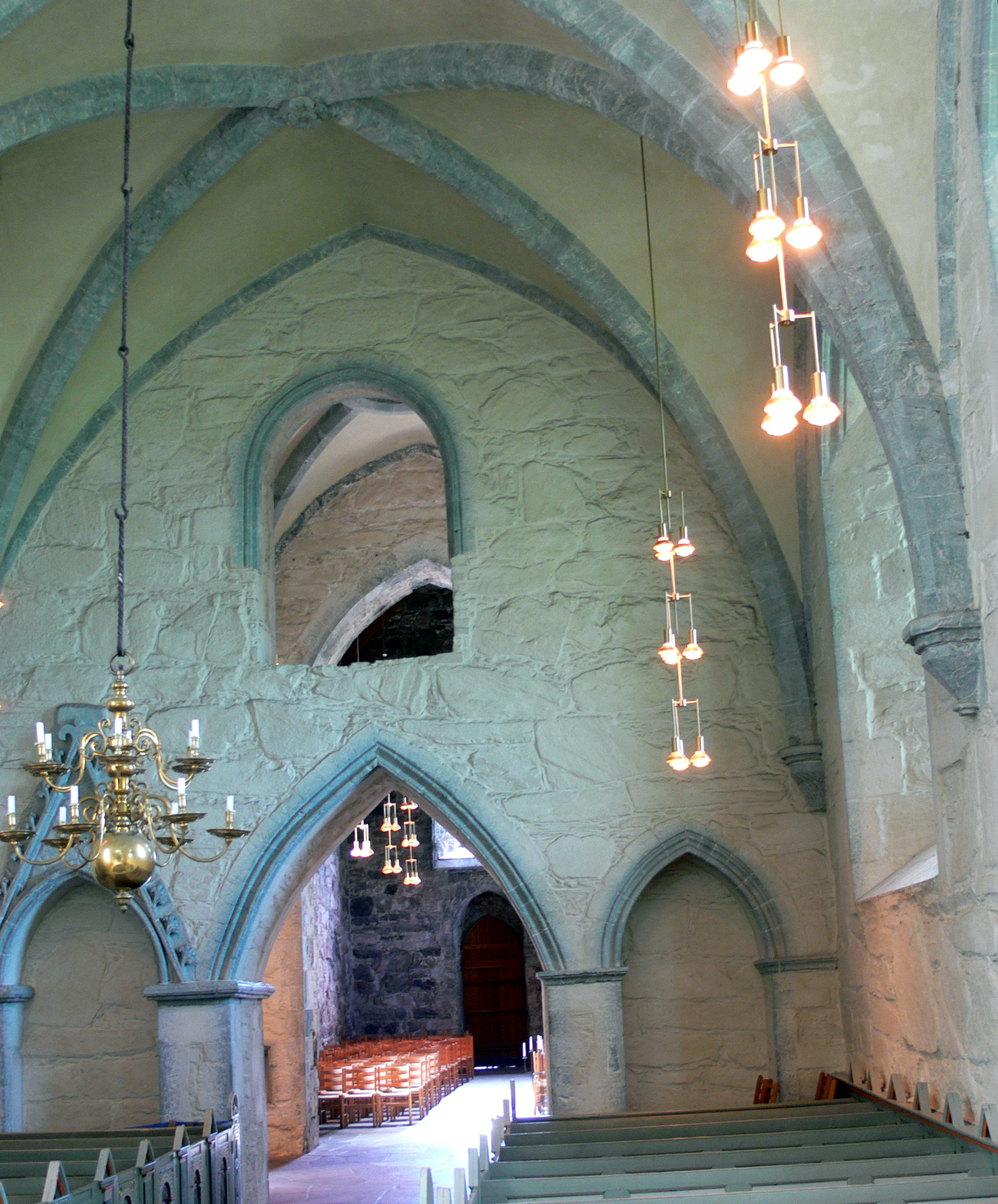

== See also ==
- List of churches in Rogaland
