= HNoMS Utstein =

HNoMS Utstein is a series of three submarines operated by the Royal Norwegian Navy. They were named after a historic Utstein Abbey which is located on the island of Klosterøy in Stavanger Municipality, Norway. The three submarines that have borne this name are:

- HNoMS Utstein (P68) was a British V-class submarine launched in 1943 (under a different name) and sold to Norway in 1946. The Norwegian Navy renamed it Utstein. It was struck in 1964.
- HNoMS Utstein (1965) was a Kobben-class submarine launched on 19 May 1965 by Rheinstahl Nordsee in Emden, Germany. It was completed on 15 September 1965. The ship was converted into a museum in 1998.
- HNoMS Utstein (1991) is a Ula-class submarine launched 25 April 1991 by Thyssen Nordseewerke in Emden, Germany. The submarine was still active in 2009.
