= Utstein Style =

The Utstein Style is a set of guidelines for uniform reporting of cardiac arrest. The Utstein Style was first proposed for emergency medical services in 1991. The name derives from a 1990 conference of the European Society of Cardiology, the European Academy of Anesthesiology, the European Society for Intensive Care Medicine, and related national societies, held at the Utstein Abbey on the island of Mosterøy, Norway.

Examples of cardiac arrest registries based on the Utstein Style include the Cardiac Arrest Registry to Enhance Survival, Resuscitation Outcomes Consortium, Save Hearts in Arizona Registry and Education, and the National Registry of CardioPulmonary Resuscitation.
