= Utstein Abbey =

Monastery in Rogaland, Norway

- Utstein Kloster
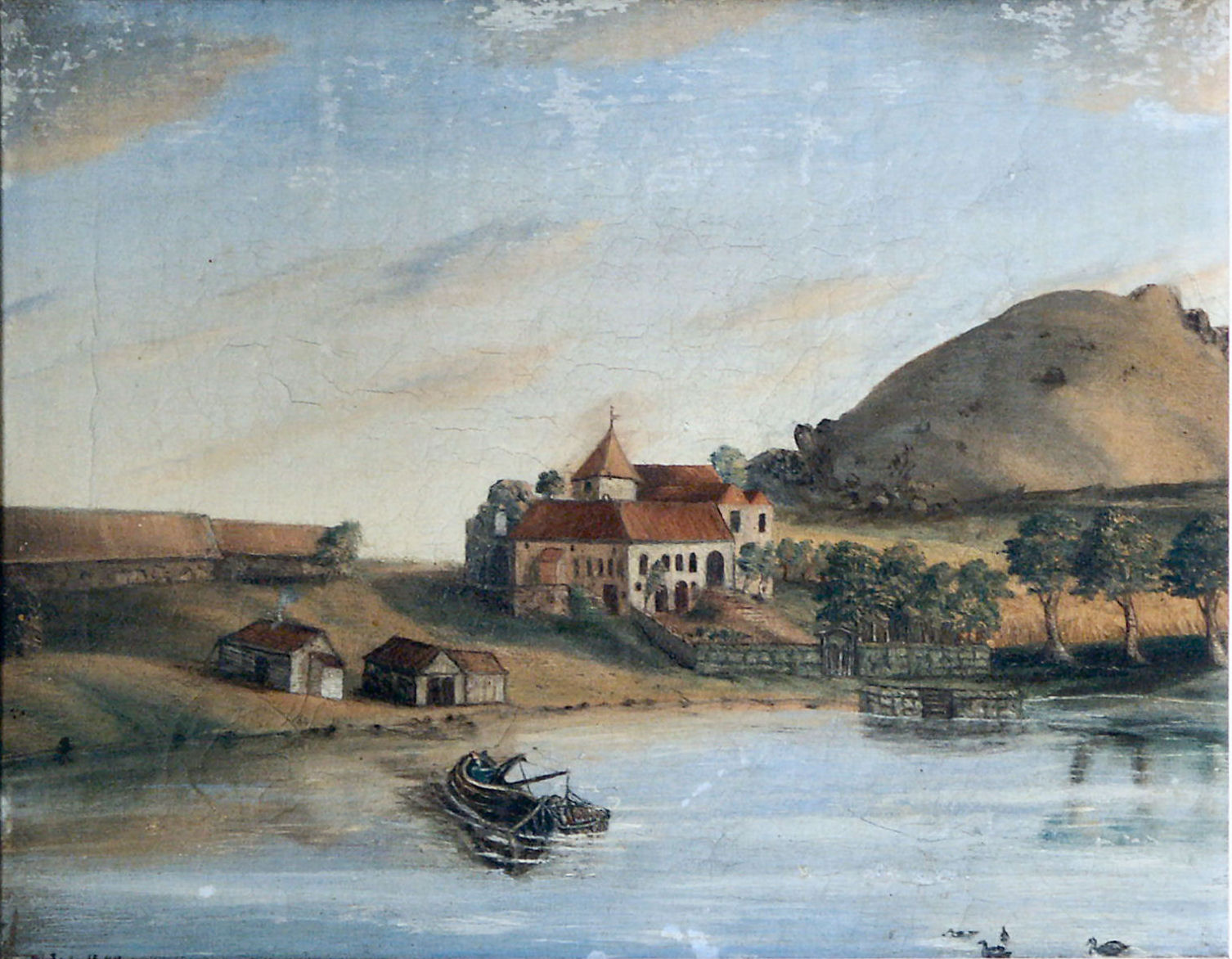
- Utstein Abbey, 18th/19th century (anon painting; photo by Frode Inge Helland
- Interactive map of Utstein Abbey

Monastery information
- Order: Augustinian Canons
- Established: 1200s
- Disestablished: 1537
- Dedication: Saint Laurence
- Controlled churches: Utstein Church

Architecture
- Status: Closed
- Functional status: Museum
- Designated date: 1899

Site
- Location: Klosterøy, Norway
- Coordinates: 59°06′11″N 5°35′26″E
- Website: www.utstein-kloster.no

Utstein Abbey (Norwegian: Utstein Kloster) is Norway's best-preserved medieval monastery. It is located on the southern shore of the island of Klosterøy in Stavanger Municipality in Rogaland county. It was built in the late 1200s. Utstein Church is located on the grounds of the abbey.

== History ==
The abbey, dedicated to Saint Laurence, was founded in its present location during the reign of King Magnus VI of Norway (1263–1280). It was a house of Augustinian Canons. It appears however that this community was the one previously established as St. Olav's Abbey, Stavanger, one of the earliest Augustinian monasteries in Norway if not the very earliest. The exact date of its foundation is unknown, but it was well established by 1160.

At its height, up to 12 monks lived at Utstein, with twice as many lay people working on the building, doing the cooking, and doing the farming. The abbey owned extensive lands, and could feed about 250 people a year. It was dissolved in 1537 during the Reformation and was given in fee to Trond Ivarsson, a nobleman who served as local bailiff.

== Present-day ==
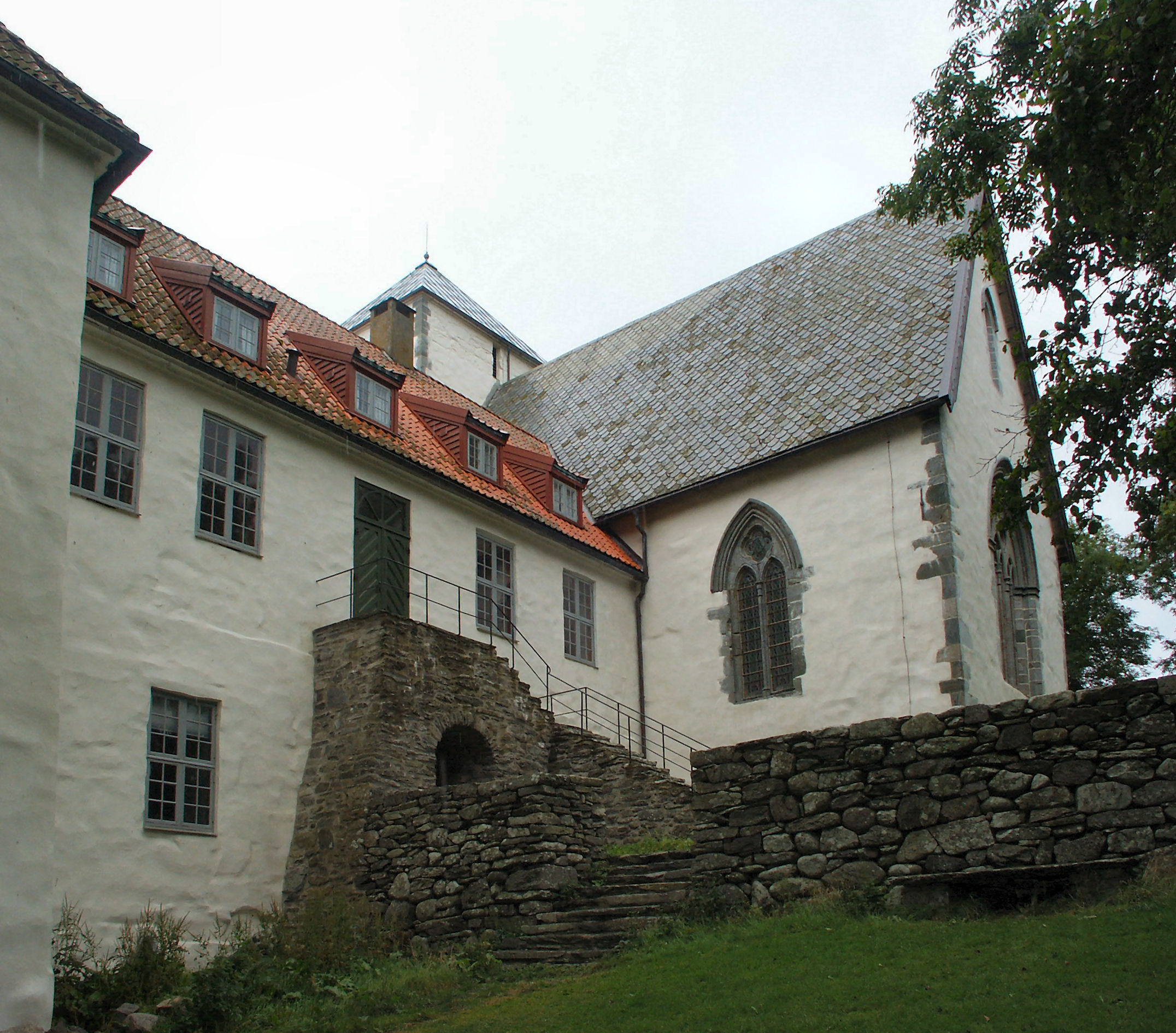
Utstein Abbey today

Utstein Abbey is the best-preserved monastery in all of Norway, still using both the church and the eastern, and southern part of the ground floor of the convent buildings. In 1900-1904 major restoration work was carried out on the church, and in 1965 work on the remaining buildings was completed.

These renovations put it in a position so that the buildings now serve as venue for concerts, seminars, and conventions. It is now owned entirely by the Utstein Kloster Foundation. The abbey can be reached from Stavanger in 30 minutes by road through the undersea Byfjord Tunnel.

=== Emergency medicine ===
The Utstein Abbey is also well known for its role in hosting conferences for development of reporting guidelines in emergency medicine, resuscitation, and traumatology. The first Utstein conference was held at the Utstein Abbey in 1990 and resulted in the publication of guidelines for uniform reporting of data from out-of-hospital cardiac arrest, the Utstein Style.

== Media gallery ==
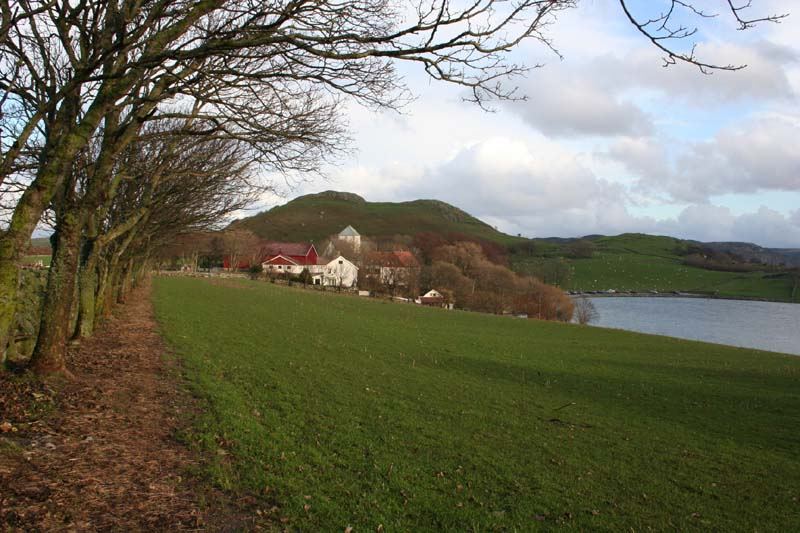

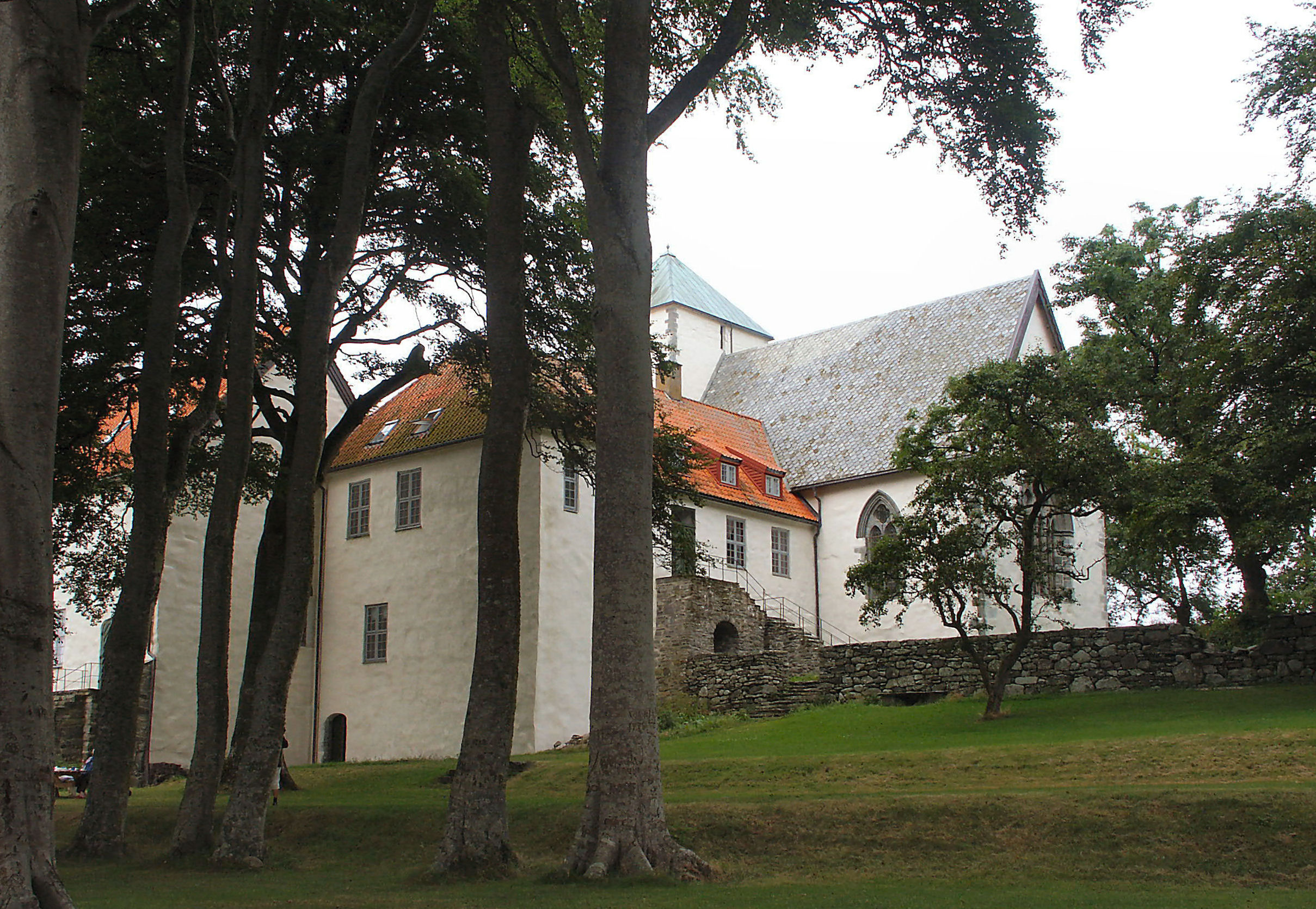

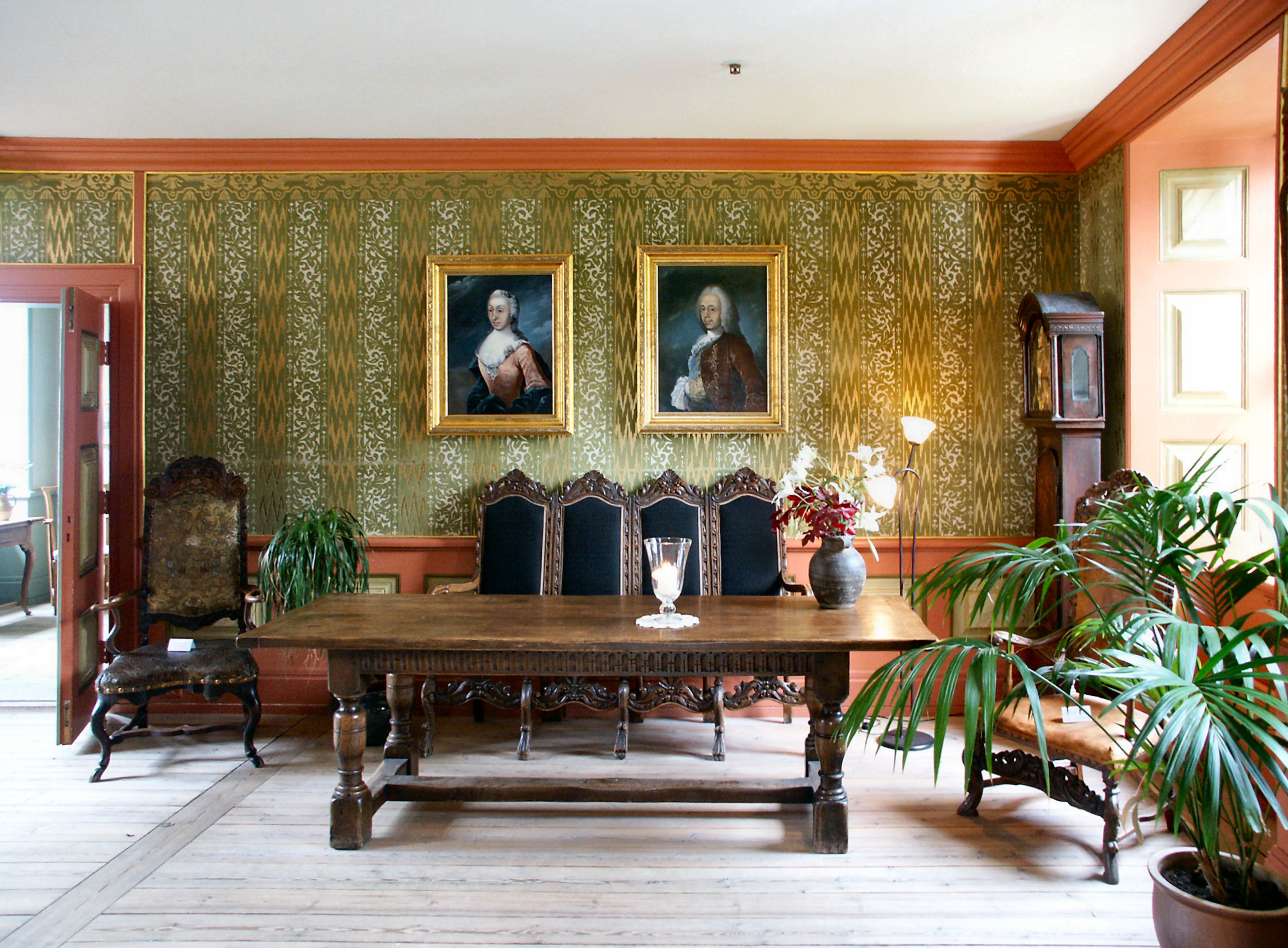

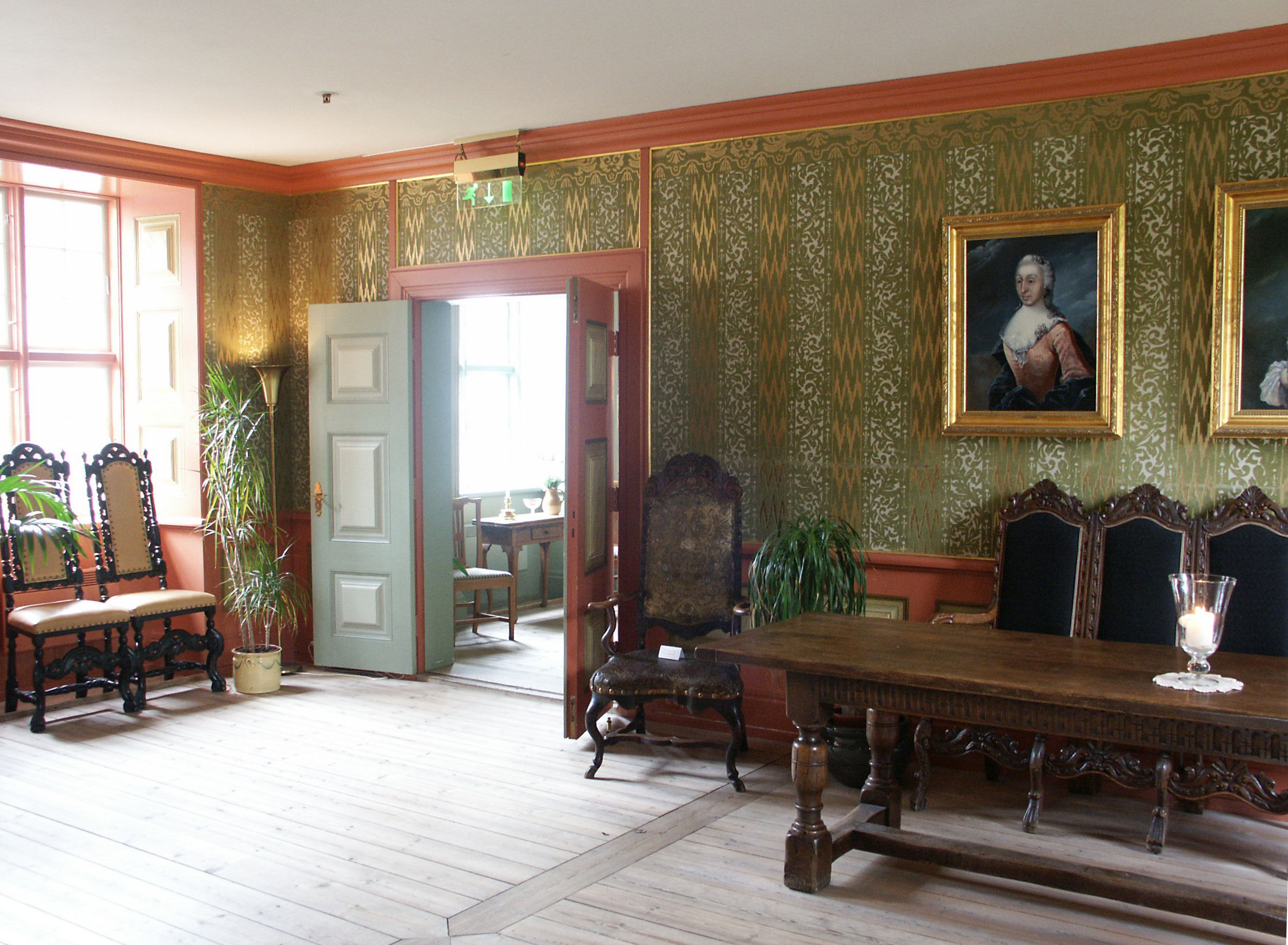

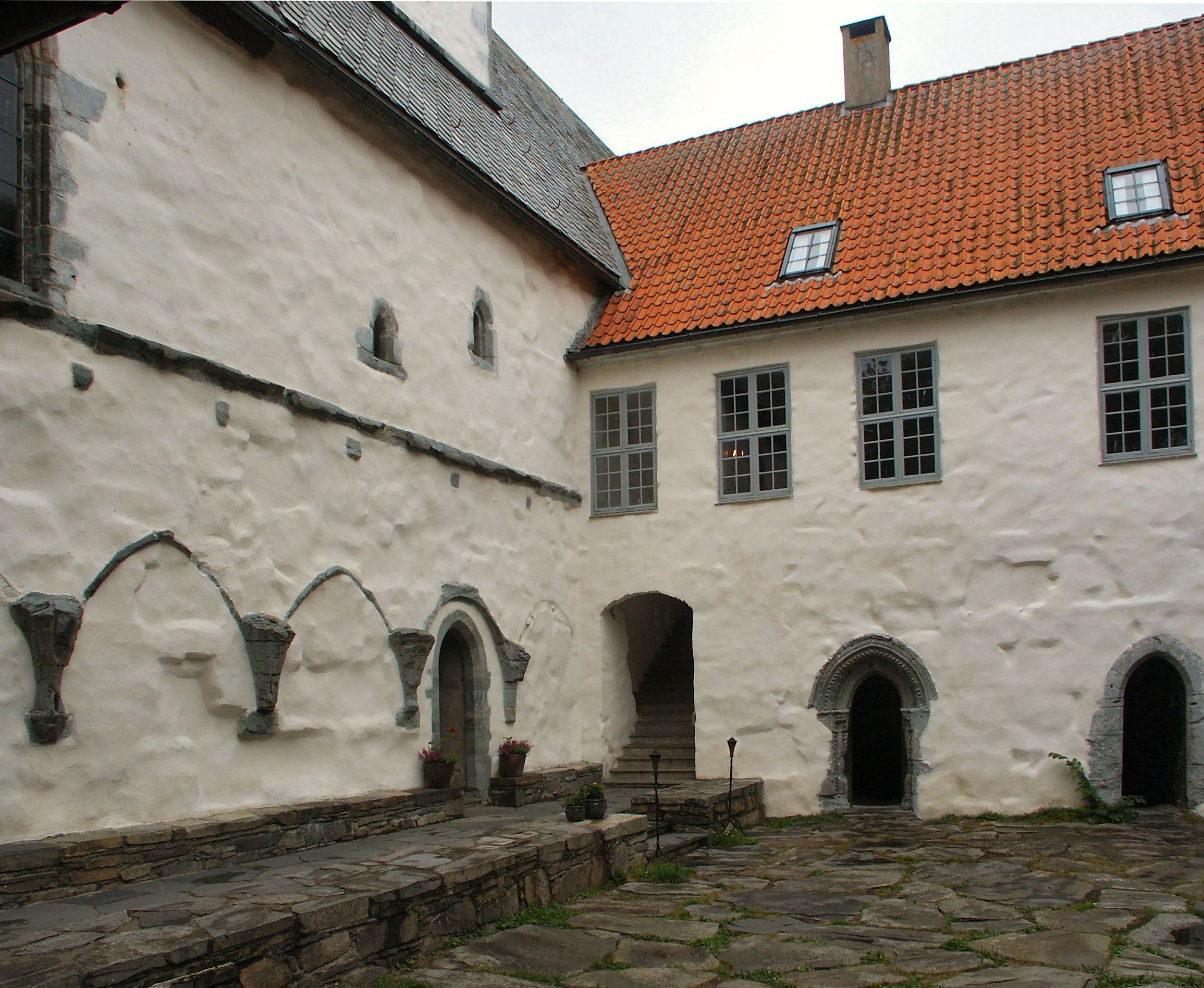

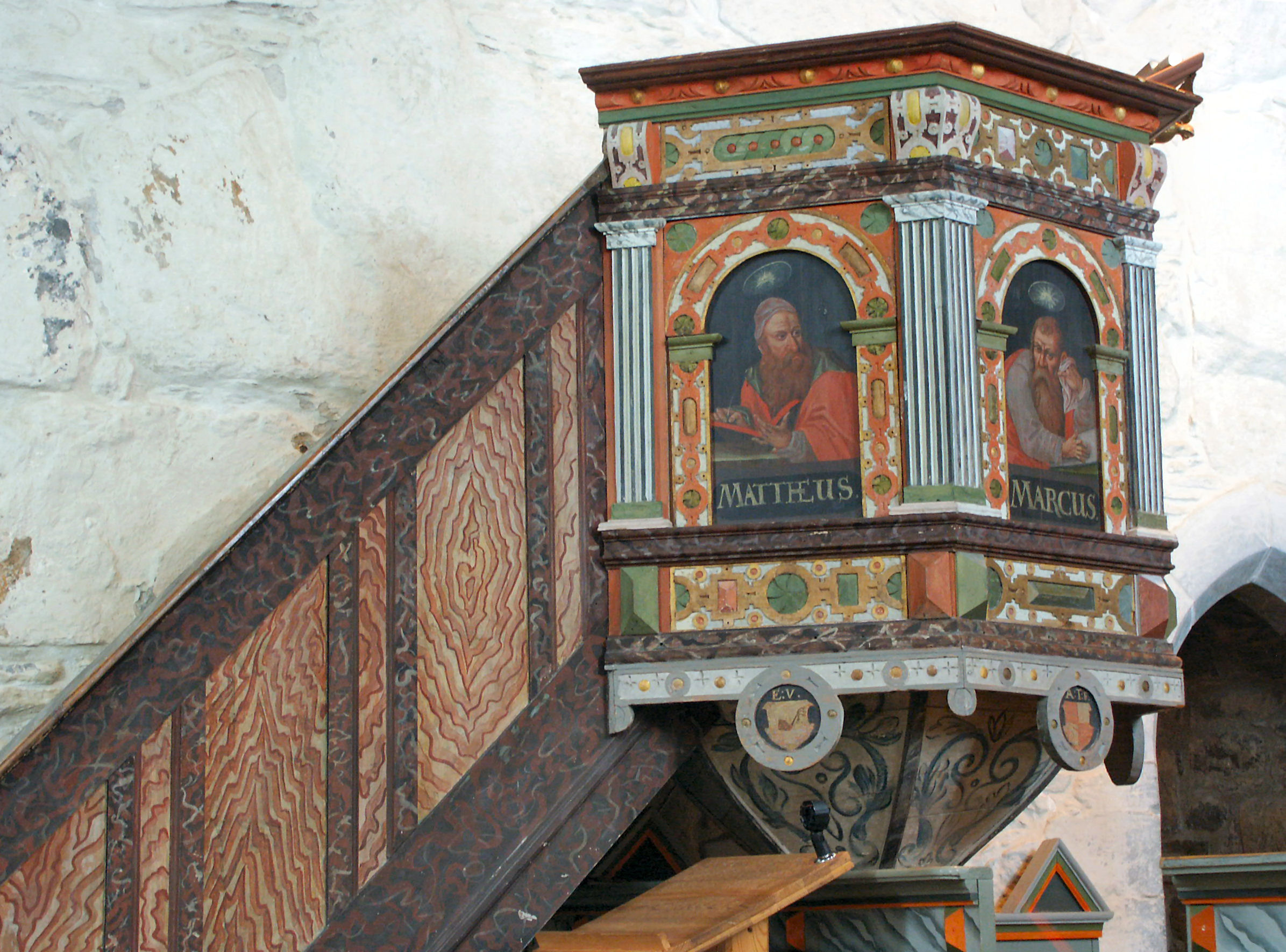

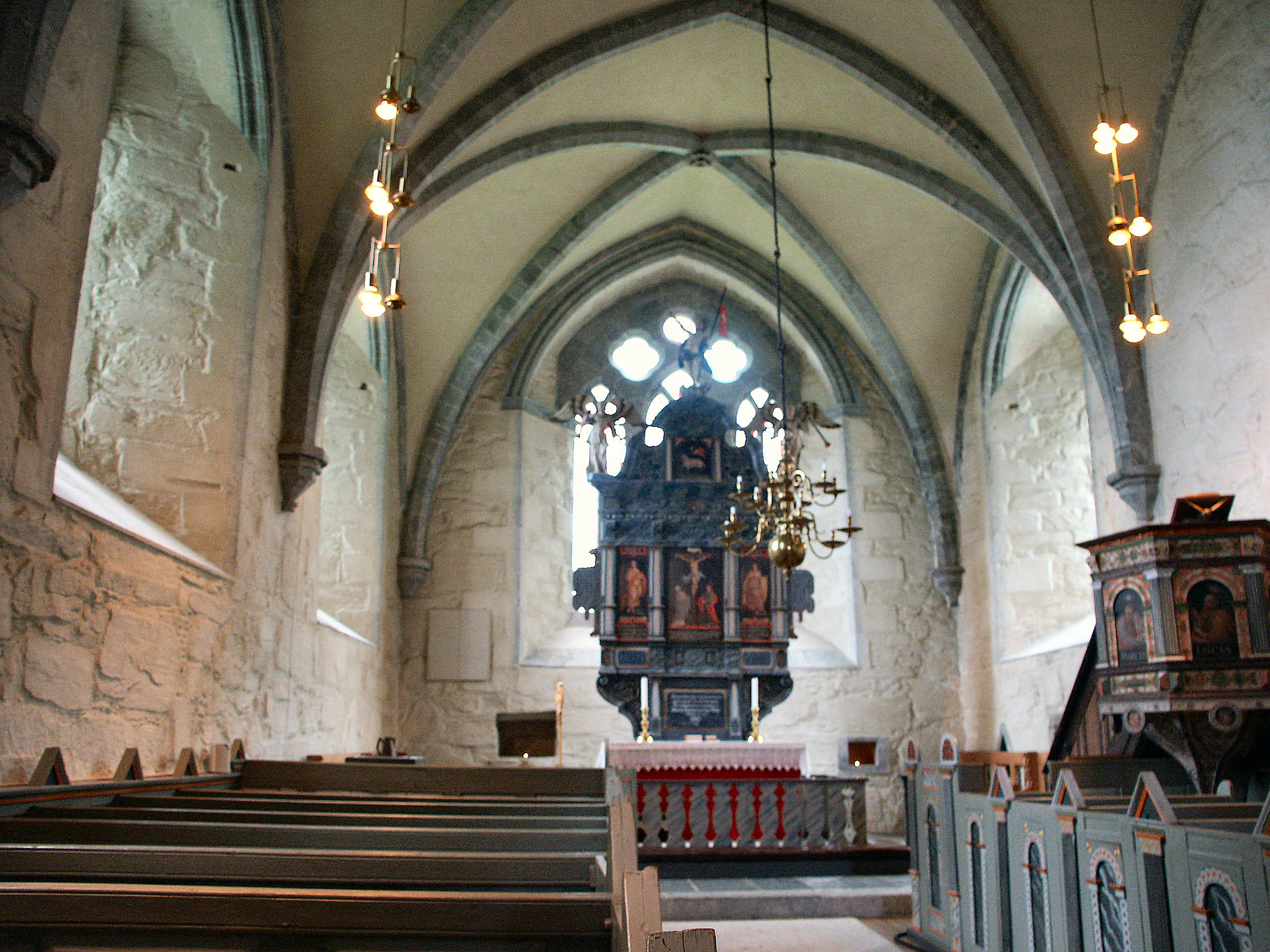

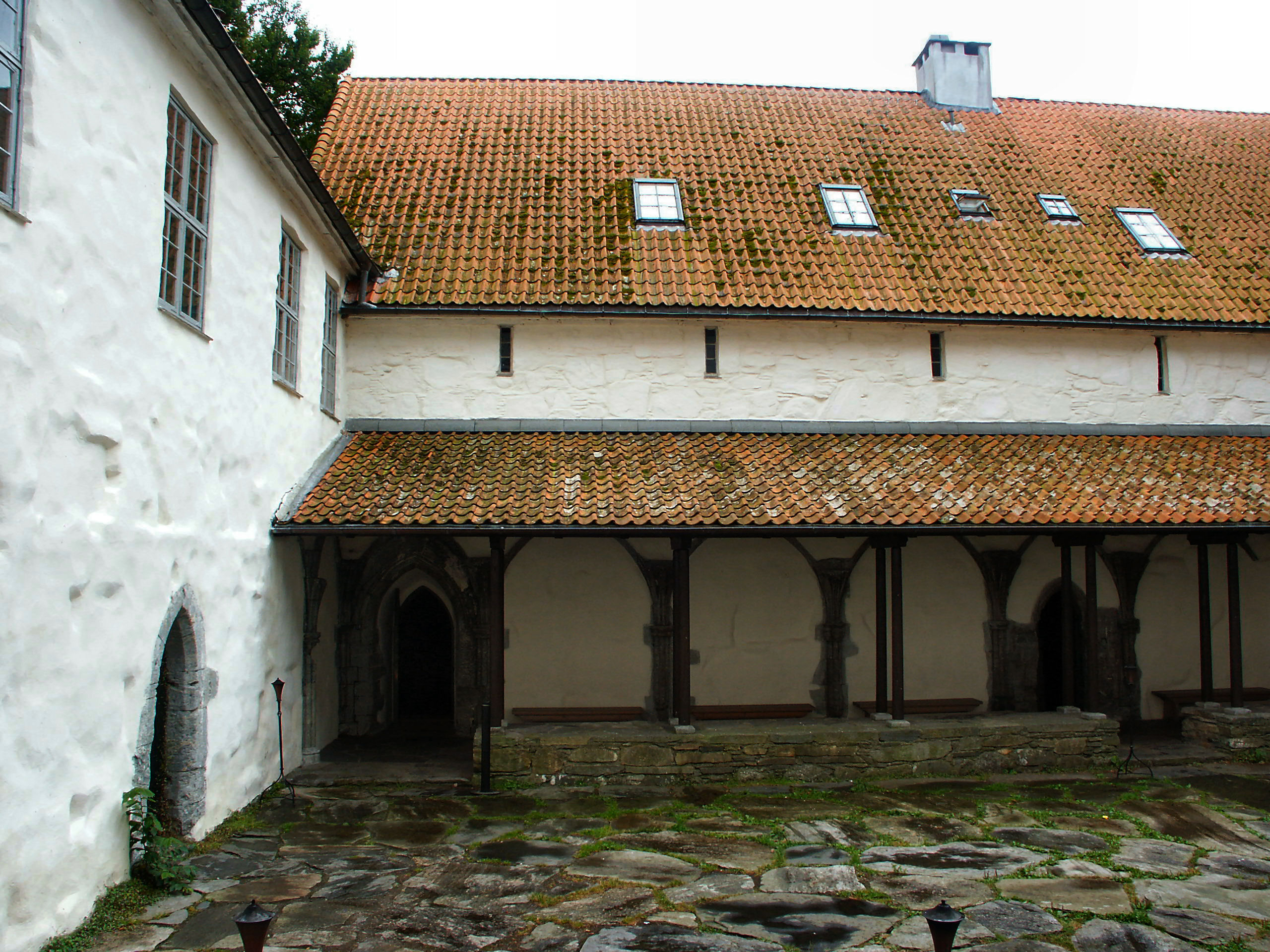

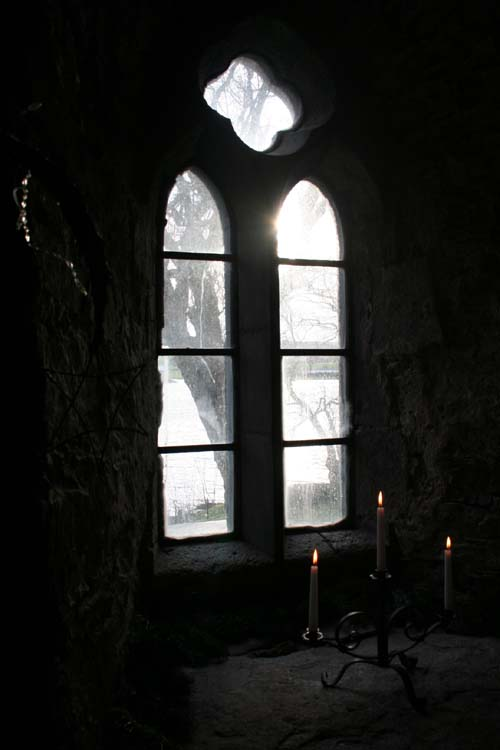

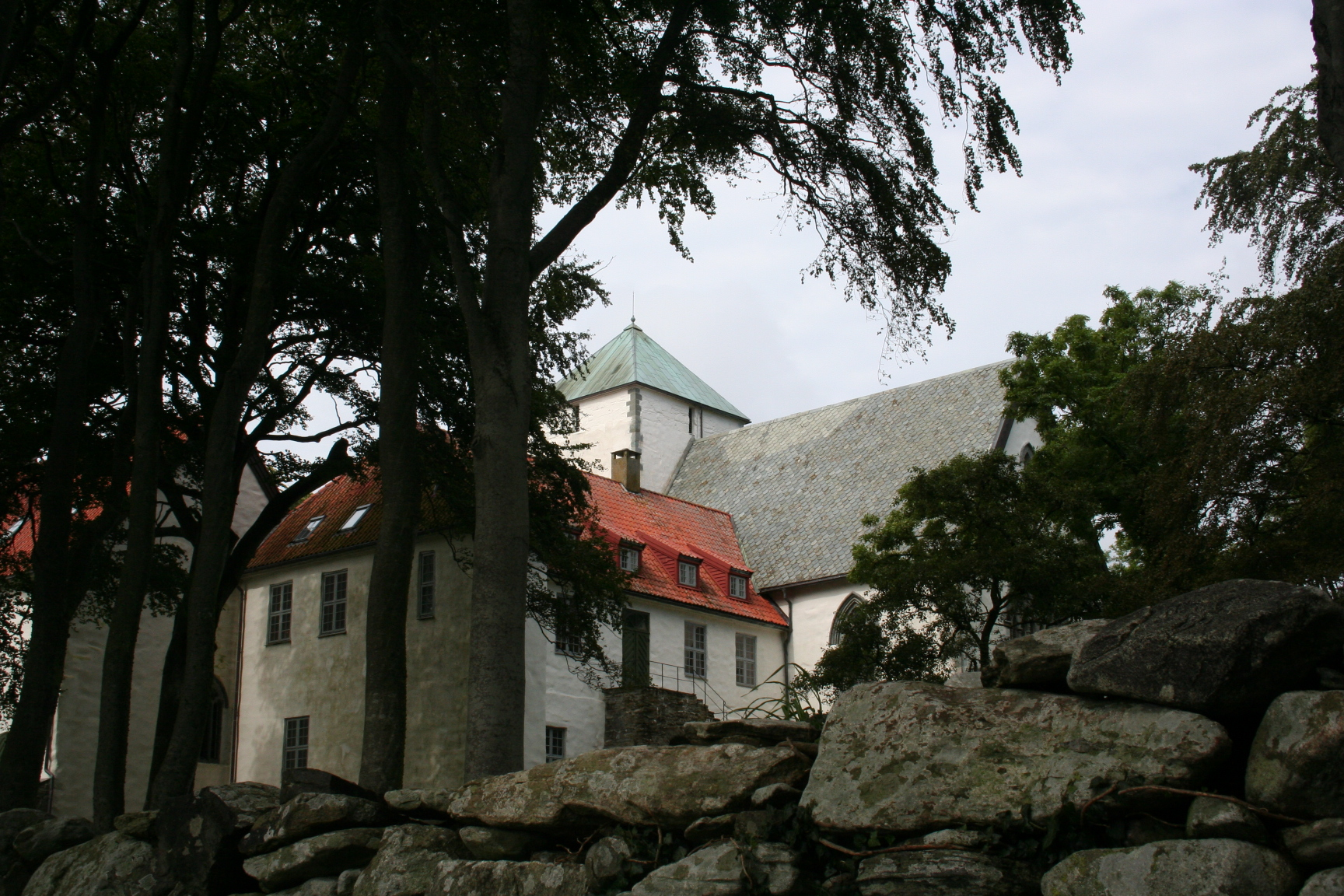

== See also ==
- Utstein Style

== Other sources ==
- Fischer, Gerhard (1965). Utstein kloster: kongsgård, kloster, herregård (in Norwegian). Stavanger: Stiftelsen Utstein kloster.
- Lexow, Jan Hendrich (1987). "Utstein kloster i middelalderen". Årbok: Foreningen til norske fortidsminnesmerkers bevaring (in Norwegian). 141: 155–168.
- Ekroll, Øystein; Stige, Morten; Havran, Jiri (2000). Middelalder i Stein (in Norwegian). Oslo: ARFO. ISBN 8291399093.
- Haug, Eldbjørg (2005). Utstein kloster: og Klosterøys historie (in Norwegian). Klosterøy: Stiftelsen Utstein Kloster. ISBN 8230305366.
